= President of the Chamber of Deputies (Mexico) =

Presiding officer of the Mexican Chamber of Deputies

- Presidente de la Cámara de Diputados
- Chamber of Deputies Seal

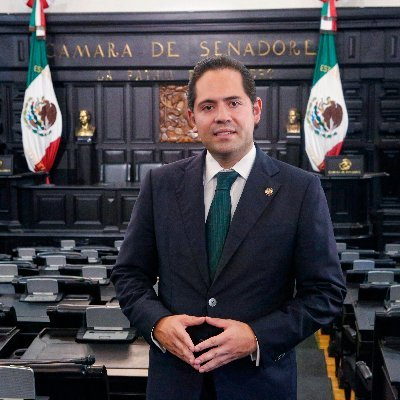
- Incumbent; Raúl Bolaños Cacho Cué since 1 September 2026
- Chamber of Deputies
- Style: Diputado(a) presidente(a)
- Status: Presiding officer
- Seat: Legislative Palace of San Lázaro, Mexico City
- Appointer: Chamber of Deputies
- Term length: One year
- Constituting instrument: Constitution of Mexico
- Formation: 1 January 1825; 201 years ago
- First holder: Miguel Valentín y Tamayo

The president of the Chamber of Deputies (Spanish: Presidente de la Cámara de Diputados) is the presiding officer of the Chamber of Deputies of Mexico. This position is analogous to the speaker of the House in other legislatures. The current president is deputy Raúl Bolaños Cacho Cué. The president is elected for a one-year term.

One of the main characteristics of the position is assuming the role of president of the Congress of the Union during joint-sessions of General Congress, including: the ceremonial opening of ordinary (and extraordinary) legislative periods, the inaugural ceremony of the president of Mexico where this presiding officer receives the presidential sash from the outgoing president to deliver it to the incoming president, and the reception of the Mexican president's yearly government report at the beginning of every legislative year (traditionally a speech to Congress, but also delivered in writing without the president's attendance since 2007) as well as delivering the official response (contestación) to the speech on behalf of Congress.

== List of presidents of the Chamber of Deputies ==
=== Mexico (1822–1824) ===
During First Mexican Empire, Provisional Government of Mexico.

Name	Term
José María Fagoaga	1822
Juan Francisco Castañiza Larrea y Gonzalez de Agüero, Bishop of Durango, Marquis of Castañiza	1823
José María Luciano Becerra	1823
Francisco Manuel Sánchex de Tagle	1823
José de Jesús Huerta	1824

=== Mexico (1825–1853) ===
During the First Mexican Republic, Centralist Republic of Mexico and Second Federal Republic of Mexico.

Cong.	Name	State	Term
1st	Miguel Valentín y Tamayo	Oaxaca	1 January 1825 – 31 January 1825
1st	Pablo Franco Coronel	Durango	31 January 1825 – 28 February 1825
1st	Félix Osores	Mexico	28 February 1825 – 5 April 1825
1st	José Antonio Ruiz de Bustamante	Chihuahua	5 April 1825 – 23 April 1825
1st	Juan Cayetano Portugal	Guanajuato	23 April 1825 – 21 May 1825
1st	Francisco Mimiaga	Oaxaca	4 August 1825 – 31 August 1825
1st	Ignacio Mora	Mexico	31 August 1825 – 30 September 1825
1st	José Ignacio Blanco	Veracruz	30 September 1825 – 31 October 1825
1st	Martínez de los Ríos	Querétaro	31 October 1825 – 30 November 1825
1st	José Manuel Zozaya	Guanajuato	30 November 1825 – 19 December 1825
1st	José Antastasio Reynoso	?	1 January 1826 – 31 January 1826
1st	Manuel Carpio	Mexico	31 January 1826 – 28 February 1826
1st	José María Pando	Oaxaca	28 February 1826 – 31 March 1826
1st	Santos Vélez	Zacatecas	31 March 1826 – 29 April 1826
1st	Bernando González Pérez de Angulo	Puebla	29 April 1826 – 23 May 1826
1st	Francisco María Lombardo	Mexico	15 September 1826 – ?
1st	Cayetano Ibarra	Mexico	1 December 1826 – 27 December 1826
2nd	José María Bocanegra	Zacatecas	1 January 1827 – 31 January 1827
2nd	Carlos García		1827
2nd	José de Jesús Huerta		1827
2nd	José María Irigoyen		1827
2nd	José María Tornel		1 January 1828
2nd	José Manuel de Herrera		1828
2nd	José María Gil y Camino		1828
2nd	Juan Cayetano Portugal		1828
3rd	José Manuel de Herrera		1829
3rd	José Ignacio Basadre		1829
3rd	Isidoro Rafael Gondra		1829
3rd	Pedro María Anaya		1829
3rd	José Sotero Castañeda		1829
3rd	Miguel Domínguez		1830
3rd	Andrés Quintana Roo		1830
4th	Miguel Valentín y Tamayo		1831
4th	Francisco Manuel Sánchez de Tagle		1831
4th	Mariano Blasco		1831
4th	Rafael Olaguíbel		1831
4th	Francisco Molinos del Campo	Federal District	1 January 1832 – 31 January 1832
4th	Joaquín Oteiza	Querétaro	31 January 1832 – 29 February 1832
4th	José María Paulín	Michoacán	29 February 1832 – 31 March 1832
4th	Atenógenes Castillero	Puebla	31 March 1832 – 30 April 1832
4th	Miguel Alfaro	Mexico	30 April 1832 – 23 May 1832
4th	José Xavier de Bustamante	Chiapas	3 August 1832 – 31 August 1832
4th	José Rafael Berruecos	Puebla	31 August 1832 – 29 September 1832
4th	Manuel de Viya y Cosío	Veracruz	29 September 1832 – ?
–	Juan Nepomuceno Cumplido		1833
–	Juan Rodrígues Puebla		1833
–	Andrés Quintana Roo		1833
–	José de Jesús Huerta		1833
–	Juan José Espinoza de los Monteros		1833
–	Casimiro Liceaga		1834
–	Basilio Arillaga		1835
–	Francisco Manuel Sánchez de Tagle		1835
–	Juan Manuel de Elizalde		1837
–	Miguel Valentín y Tamayo		1837
–	José María Jiménez		1837
–	Pedro Barajas		1838
–	José María Cuevas		1838
–	José Bernardo Couto		1838
–	José Rafael Berruecos		1838
–	José Luciano Becerra		1839
–	Marcelino Ezeta		1839
–	Antonio Madrid		1839
–	Pedro Barajas		1839
–	José Rafael Berruecos		1840
–	José María Figueroa		1840
–	Pedro Barajas		1841
–	José María Bravo		1841
–	Pedro Rojas		1841
–	José María Tornel		1841
–	Juan José Espinoza de los Monteros		1842
–	Casimiro Liceaga		1842
–	Gabriel Valencia		1843
–	Manuel Baranda		1843
–	Joaquín Ramírez España		1843
–	José María Jiménez		1844
–	José Julián Tornel		1844
–	Rafael Espinosa		1844
–	José de Jesús Dávila y Prieto		1844
–	Joaquín Ladrón de Guevara		1844
–	José Joaquín de Herrera		1844
–	Juan N. Vertiz		1844
–	Luis G. Solana		1844
–	Luis de la Rosa Oteiza		1845
–	Miguel Atristain		1845
–	Miguel Sagaceta		1845
–	Demetrio Montes de Oca		1845
–	Luis G. Gordoa		1846
–	Anastasio Bustamante		1846
–	Pedro Zubieta		1846
–	Mariano Otero y Mestas		1847
–	José Joaquín de Herrera		1847
–	José María de Godoy		1847
–	Francisco Antonio Elorriaga		1848
–	José María Lacunza		1848
–	Mariano Yáñez		1849
–	José Bernardo Couto		1849
–	José María Bocanegra		1849
–	José María Godoy		1850
–	José Bernardo Couto		1850
–	Mariano Yáñez		1850–1851
–	Lino José Alcorta		1851
–	Juan Morales Ayala		1851
–	Juan Antonio de la Fuente		1852
–	León Guzmán		1852
–	Manuel Buenrostro		1852
–	Manuel García Aguirre		1852
–	Ezequiel Montes Ledesma		1853
–	Marcelino Castañeda		1853

=== Mexico 1856–1857 ===
Presidents of the Constituent Congress of 1857.

Name	Term
Ponciano Arriaga	14 February 1856 – 29 February 1856
Melchor Ocampo	1 March 1856 – 31 March 1856
Mateo Echaiz	1 April 1856 – 30 April 1856
José de la Luz Rosas	1 May 1856 – 31 May 1856
Antonio Aguado	1 June 1856 – 30 June 1856
Pedro Escudero y Echánove	1 July 1856 – 31 July 1856
Santos Degollado	1 August 1856 – 31 August 1856
Mariano Arizcorreta	1 September 1856 – 30 September 1856
José María Mata	1 October 1856 – 31 October 1856
Marcelino Castañeda	1 November 1856 – 2 December 1856
Sabás Iturbide	2 December 1856 – 31 December 1856
León Guzmán	1 January 1857 – 31 January 1857
Valentín Gómez Farías	1 February 1857 – 17 February 1857

=== Mexico 1857–1863 ===
Presidents of the Chamber of Deputies under the Constitution of 1857.

Name	Term
Manuel Ruíz	1857
Isidoro Olvera	1857
José María Aguirre y Fierro	1861
Gabino F. Bustamante	1861
José Linares	1861
Sebastián Lerdo de Tejada	1861
José María Bautista	1861
Vicente Riva Palacio	1861
Sebastián Lerdo de Tejada	1862
José Linares	1862
José Linares Echeverría	1862
Ponciano Arriaga	1862–1863
Sebastián Lerdo de Tejada	1863

=== Mexico 1867–1917 ===
Presidents of the Chamber of Deputies after the Second French intervention in Mexico.

Name	Term
Ezequiel Montes Ledesma	1867
Manuel Saavedra	1867
José María Iglesias	1868
Juan Doria	1868
Francisco Zarco	1868
Justino Fernández Mondoño	1868
Manuel María de Zamacona y Murphy	1869
Nicolás Lemus	1869
Francisco G. del Palacio	1869
Mariano Riva Palacio	1869
José María Lozano	1870
Manuel Romero Rubio	1870
Guillermo Valle	1870
Ignacio L. Vallarta	1870
José María Lozano	1870
Manuel María de Zamacona y Murphy	1871
Justino Fernández Mondoño	1871
Ezequiel Montes Ledesma	1871
Gabriel Mancera	1871
Alfredo Chavero	1871
Guillermo Valle	1872
José Higinio Núñez	1872
Pedro Baranda	1872
Nicolás Lemus	1872
Francisco G. del Palacio	1872
Manuel Romero Rubio	1872
Nicolás Lemus	1872
Mariano Yáñez	1872
Manuel Romero Rubio	1874
Ramón G. Guzmán	1874
Mariano Yáñez	1874
Antonio Tagle	1875
Guillermo Valle	1875
Manuel Castilla Portugal	1876
F. Hernández Hernández	1876
Juan Crisóstomo Bonilla	1876
Prisciliano M. Díaz González	1877
Felipe Buenrostro	1877
Francisco Sada	1878
Alfredo Chavero	1878
Pedro Collantes	1879
M. Muñoz Ledo	1879
Antonio Carbajal	1880
Vicente Riva Palacio	1880
Antonio Carbajal	1881
Ignacio M. Altamirano	1881
Guillermo Valle	1882
Manuel Dublán	1882
Manuel Saavedra	1883
Francisco Montes de Oca	1883
Faustino Michel	1884
Jesús Fuentes y Muñiz	1884
José María Lozano	1885
Alfredo Chavero	1885
Apolinar Castillo	1886
Alfonso Láncaster Jones	1886
Ramón Rodrígues Rivera	1887
José Yves Limantour	1887
Alfredo Chavero	1888
Trinidad García	1888
Justino Fernández Mondoño	1889
Pedro Rincón Gallardo	1889
Mariano Ortíz de Montellano	1890
Alfredo Chavero	1890
Trinidad García	1891
Justo Sierra	1891
José Yves Limantour	1892
Trinidad García	1892
José María Romero	1893
José de Jesús López	1893
José María Romero	1894
Ignacio Mañón y Valle	1894
Mariano Escobedo	1895
Joaquín D. Casasús	1895
José María Romero	1896
Emilio Pardo Jr.	1896
Luis Pérez Verdía	1897
Justino Fernández Mondoño	1897
Emilio Pardo Jr.	1898
Rosendo Pineda	1898
Manuel Z. Doria	1899
Pedro de Azcué	1899
Trinidad García	1900
Justino Fernández Mondoño	1900
José López y Rojas	1901
Pablo Martínez del Río	1901
Manuel Flores	1902
Félix Díaz	1902
Joaquín D. Casasús	1903
Miguel Bolaños Cacho	1903
Trinidad García	1904
Gabriel Mancera	1904
Pablo Martínez del Río	1905
Ángel Ortíz Monasterio	1905
Rosendo Pineda	1906
Gabriel Mancera	1906
Porfirio Parra	1907
Pablo Macedo	16 September 1907 – 30 September 1907
Manuel Calero	1 October 1907 – 31 October 1907
Ignacio Muñoz	1 November 1907 – 30 November 1907
Eutimio Cervantes	1 December 1907 – 15 December 1907
Manuel Flores	1 April 1908 – 30 April 1908
Juan Robles Linares	1 May 1908 – 31 May 1908
Fernando Vega	1 June 1908 – 16 June 1908
Gregorio Mendizábal	16 September 1908 – 30 September 1908
Gabriel Mancera	1 October 1908 – 31 October 1908
Jesús M. Cerda	1 November 1908 – 30 November 1908
José R. Aspe	1 December 1908 – 15 December 1908
Carlos M. Saavedra	1 April 1909 – 30 April 1909
Rosendo Pineda	1 May 1909 – 31 May 1909
Fernando Duret	16 September 1909 – 30 September 1909
Manuel Flores	1 October 1909 – 31 October 1909
Luis Pérez Verdía	1 November 1909 – 30 November 1909
Victoriano Salado Álvarez	1 December 1909 – 15 December 1909
Francisco Bulnes	1 April 1910 – 30 April 1909
Gabriel Mancera	1 May 1910 – 31 May 1910
Pablo Macedo	16 September 1910 – 30 September 1910
Gregorio Mendizábal	1 October 1910 – 31 October 1910
Daniel García	1 November 1910 – 30 November 1910
Manuel Flores	1 December 1910 – 15 December 1910
Fernando Duret	1 April 1911 – 30 April 1911
Eduardo Novoa	16 September 1911 – 30 September 1911
Manuel Levi	1 April 1912 – 30 April 1912
Guillermo Obregón	16 September 1912 – 30 September 1912
Eduardo F. Hay	1912
José J. Reynoso	1 January 1913 – 31 January 1913
Francisco Romero	1 February 1913 – 28 February 1913
Manuel Malo y Juvera	1913
Jorge Delorme y Campos	1913
Eduardo Tamariz	1913
Miguel Ahumada	1914
Luis Manuel Rojas	1916

=== Modern Mexico after 1917 ===
After the 1917 Constitution of Mexico was taken into use.

Legis.	Name	Party	District	Term
27th	Hilario Medina			April 1917 – May 1917
27th	Eduardo Hay			May 1917 – June 1917
27th	Jesús Acuña			June 1917 – July 1917
27th	Reynaldo Narro			July 1917 – August 1917
27th	José Siurob			August 1917 – September 1917
27th	Jesús Urueta			1 September 1917 – 30 September 1917
27th	Luis Sánchez Pontón			October 1917 – November 1917
27th	Porfirio del Castillo			November 1917 – December 1917
27th	Aarón Sáenz			December 1917 – January 1918
27th	Eduardo Neri			January 1918 – August 1918
28th	Federico Montes			1 September 1918 – 30 September 1918
28th	Juan Manuel Álvarez del Castillo			1 October 1918 – 31 October 1918
28th	Eliseo L. Céspedes			1 November 1918 – 30 November 1918
28th	Ramón Blancarte			1 December 1918 – 25 April 1919
28th	Gildardo Gómez			25 April 1919 – 1 June 1919
28th	Francisco César Morales			1 June 1919 – 1 July 1919
28th	Isaac Olivé			1 July 1919 – 1 August 1919
28th	José Castillo Torre			1 August 1919 – 31 August 1919
28th	Arturo Méndez			1 September 1919 – 30 September 1919
28th	Rosendo Soto			1 October 1919 – 31 October 1919
28th	Agustín Franco			1 November 1919 – 30 November 1919
28th	Francisco R. Serrano			1 December 1919 – ?
29th	Manuel García Vigil			1 September 1920 – ?
29th	Adolfo Cienfuegos			1921
29th	Enrique Bordes Mangel			1 September 1921 – ?
30th	Juan Manuel Álvarez del Castillo			1 September 1922 – ?
30th	Jorge Prieto Laurens			1 September 1923 – ?
31st	Alfredo Romo			1 September 1924 – 30 September 1924
31st	Genaro V. Vásquez			1 October 1924 – 31 October 1924
31st	Filiberto Gómez			1 November 1924 – 30 November 1924
31st	Francisco Gárcía Carranza			1 December 1924 – 31 August 1925
31st	Ezequiel Padilla			1 September 1925 – ?
32nd	Gonzalo N. Santos			1 September 1926 – ?
32nd	Ricardo Topete			1 September 1927 – ?
32nd	J. G. de la Anda			1928
33rd	Ricardo Topete			1 September 1928 – 30 September 1928
33rd	Francisco López Cortés			1 October 1928 – 31 October 1928
33rd	Marte R. Gómez			1 November 1928 – 30 November 1928
33rd	Zenón Suárez			1 December 1928 – 1 May 1929
33rd	Manuel Riva Palacio			1 May 1929 – 1 June 1929
33rd	Pedro Palazuelos Léycegui			1 June 1929 – 1 July 1929
33rd	Francisco Trujillo Gurria			1 July 1929 – 1 August 1929
33rd	Rafael Quevedo			1 August 1929 – 31 August 1929
33rd	Federico Medrano			1 September 1929 – 30 September 1929
33rd	Esteban García de Alba			1 October 1929 – 31 October 1929
33rd	Manuel Avilés			1 November 1929 – ?
34th	José Pérez Gil y Ortíz			1 September 1930 – 30 September 1930
34th	Ernesto Soto Reyes			1 October 1930 – 31 October 1930
34th	Leopoldo Reynoso Díaz			1 November 1930 – 30 November 1930
34th	Pedro C. Rodríguez			1 December 1930 – 1 May 1931
34th	Neguib Simón			1 May 1931 – 1 June 1931
34th	Enrique Hernández Alvarez			1 June 1931 – 1 July 1931
34th	Gonzalo Bautista			1 July 1931 – 1 August 1931
34th	Ismael M. Lozano			1 August 1931 – 31 August 1931
34th	Fernando Moctezuma			1 September 1931 – 30 September 1931
34th	Salvador López Moreno			1 October 1931 – ?
34th	Juan Enrique Azuara			1931
35th	Flavio Pérez Gasga			1 September 1932 – 30 September 1932
35th	Juan C. Peña			1 October 1932 – 31 October 1932
35th	Ezequiel Padilla			1 November 1932 – 30 November 1932
35th	Gonzalo Bautista			1 December 1932 – ?
35th	Manuel Mijares V.			20 March 1933 – ?
35th	Juan Aviña López			1 September 1933 – 30 September 1933
35th	Alejandro Antuna López			1 October 1933 – 31 October 1933
35th	Fernando Moctezuma			1 November 1933 – ?
36th	Romero Ortega			1 September 1934 – 30 September 1934
36th	Carlos Real			1 October 1934 – 31 October 1934
36th	Enrique González Flores			1 November 1934 – 30 November 1934
36th	Donaciano Carreón			1 December 1934 – ?
36th	Gilberto Bosques			1 September 1935 – 30 September 1935
36th	Rodolfo T. Loaiza			1 October 1935 – 31 October 1935
36th	Altamirano Manila Labio			1 November 1935 – 30 November 1935
36th	Luis Enrique Erro			1 September 1936 – ?
36th	Jacinto R. Palacio			1 December 1936 – ?
37th	José Cantú Estrada			1 September 1937 – 30 September 1937
37th	Antolín Piña Soria			1 October 1937 – 31 October 1937
37th	Alfonso Francisco Ramírez			1 November 1937 – 30 November 1937
37th	Enrique Estrada			1 December 1937 – ?
37th	León García	PRM		13 April 1938 – ?
37th	Jesús Mondragón Ramírez	PRM		1 May 1938 – ?
37th	Rodolfo Delgado	PRM		1 September 1938 – 30 September 1938
37th	Miguel Moreno	PRM		1 October 1938 – 31 October 1938
37th	Marcelino Barba González	PRM		1 November 1938 – 30 November 1938
37th	Félix de la Lanza	PRM		1 December 1938 – ?
37th	José Aguilar y Maya	PRM		15 May 1939 – ?
37th	Efraín Aranda Osorio	PRM		2 June 1939 – ?
37th	César Martino	PRM		1 September 1939 – 30 September 1939
37th	Heliodoro Charis Castro	PRM		1 October 1939 – 31 October 1939
37th	Teobaldo Pérez	PRM		1 November 1939 – 30 November 1939
37th	José Escudero Andrade	PRM		1 December 1939 – ?
37th	Manuel Jasso	PRM		15 July 1940 – ?
38th	Manuel Martínez Sicilia	PRM		1 September 1940 – 30 September 1940
38th	Ernesto Gallardo Sánchez	PRM		1 October 1940 – 31 October 1940
38th	Blas Chumacero	PRM		1 November 1940 – 30 November 1940
38th	Jesús U. Molina	PRM		1 December 1940 – 1 February 1941
38th	Mariano Samayoa	PRM		1 February 1941 – 31 August 1941
38th	Alejandro Carrillo	PRM		1 September 1941 – 30 September 1941
38th	Arnulfo Rosas	PRM		1 October 1941 – 31 October 1941
38th	Rafael Granja Lizáragga	PRM		1 November 1941 – 30 November 1941
38th	Armando P. Arroyo	PRM		1 December 1941 – 1 May 1942
38th	Emilio Gutiérrez Roldán	PRM		1 May 1942 – 31 August 1942
38th	Manuel Gudiño	PRM		1 September 1942 – 30 September 1942
38th	Braulio Meraz Nevárez	PRM		1 October 1942 – ?
38th	José Gómez Esparza	PRM		1 December 1942 – ?
39th	Manuel Moreno Sánchez	PRM		1 September 1943 – 30 September 1943
39th	Gorgonio Quesnel Acosta	PRM		1 October 1943 – 31 October 1943
39th	Heliodoro Hernández Loza	PRM		1 November 1943 – 30 November 1943
39th	Gabriel Ramos Millán	PRM		1 December 1943 – ?
39th	Federico Medrano Valdivia	PRM		5 January 1944 – ?
39th	Herminio Ahumada Jr.	PRM		1 September 1944 – 30 September 1944
39th	Graciano Sánchez	PRM		1 October 1944 – 31 October 1944
39th	Heliodoro Hernández Loza	PRM		1 November 1944 – 30 November 1944
39th	Miguel Moreno Padilla	PRM		1 December 1944 – ?
39th	Benito Coquet	PRM		1 September 1945 – 30 September 1945
39th	Raúl López Sánchez	PRM		1 October 1945 – 31 October 1945
39th	Heliodoro Hernández Loza	PRM		1 November 1945 – 30 November 1945
39th	Julián Garza Tijerina	PRM		1 December 1945 – ?
39th	Benito Coquet	PRM		7 January 1946 – ?
40th	Eugenio Prado	PRI		1 September 1946 – 30 September 1946
40th	Ramón Castellanos Camacho	PRI		1 October 1946 – 31 October 1946
40th	Federico Berrueto Ramón	PRI		1 November 1946 – 30 November 1946
40th	José López Bermúdez	PRI		1 December 1946 – 31 August 1947
40th	Alejandro Gómez Maganda	PRI		1 September 1947 – 30 September 1947
40th	David Romero Castañeda	PRI		1 October 1947 – 31 October 1947
40th	Francisco Núñez Chávez	PRI		1 November 1947 – 30 November 1947
40th	Luis Díaz Infante	PRI		1 December 1947 – 31 August 1948
40th	Jesús Aguirre Delgado	PRI		1 September 1948 – ?
40th	Fernando Amilpa	PRI		1 November 1948 – 30 November 1948
40th	Carlos I. Serrano	PRI		1 December 1948 – 31 December 1948
40th	Fernando Cruz Chávez	PRI		1 January 1949 – ?
41st	Armando del Castillo Franco	PRI		1 September 1949 – ?
41st	Teófilo Borunda	PRI		? – January 1950 – April 1950 – ?
41st	Manuel Jiménez San Pedro	PRI		1 September 1950 – 30 September 1950
41st	Tito Ortega Sánchez	PRI		1 October 1950 – ?
41st	Esteban Uranga	PRI		1 December 1950 – 31 August 1951
41st	Teófilo Borunda	PRI		1 September 1951 – 30 September 1951
41st	Milton Castellanos Everardo	PRI		1 October 1951 – 31 October 1951
41st	Rafael Corrales Ayala	PRI		1 November 1951 – 30 November 1951
41st	Alfonso Pérez Gasga	PRI		1 December 1951 – ?
41st	Braulio Maldonado Sández	PRI		? – August 1952 – ?
42nd	Jesús Robles Martínez	PRI		1 September 1952 – 30 September 1952
42nd	Benito Palomino Dens	PRI		1 October 1952 – 31 October 1952
42nd	Luis Quintero Gutiérrez	PRI		1 November 1952 – 30 November 1952
42nd	Guillermo Corssen Luna	PRI		1 December 1952 – 31 August 1953
42nd	Antonio Erales Abdelnur	PRI		1 September 1953 – 30 September 1953
42nd	Antonio Bustillos Carrillo	PRI		1 October 1953 – 31 October 1953
42nd	Ernesto Gallardo Sánchez	PRI		1 November 1953 – 30 November 1953
42nd	Jorge Huarte Osorio	PRI		1 December 1953 – 31 August 1954
42nd	Norberto Treviño Zapata	PRI		1 September 1954 – 30 September 1954
42nd	Agustín Olivo Monsivais	PRI		1 October 1954 – ?
42nd	Rodolfo González Guevara	PRI		1 December 1954 – ?
43rd	Flavio Romero de Velasco	PRI		1 September 1955 – 30 September 1955
43rd	Raúl Bolaños Cache Güendelain	PRI		1 October 1955 – 31 October 1955
43rd	Rafael González Montemayor	PRI		1 November 1955 – 30 November 1955
43rd	Carlos Valdés Villareal	PRI		1 December 1955 – 14 March 1956
43rd	Ángel Lozano Elizondo	PRI		14 March 1956 – 15 June 1956
43rd	Alfonso Fernández Monreal	PRI		15 June 1956 – 31 August 1956
43rd	Rafael Corrales Ayala	PRI		1 September 1956 – 30 September 1956
43rd	Antonio Arriaga Ochoa	PRI		1 October 1956 – 31 October 1956
43rd	Julian Rodríguez Adame	PRI		1 November 1956 – 30 November 1956
43rd	Carlos Ramírez Guerrero	PRI		1 December 1956 – ?
43rd	José López Bermúdez	PRI		1 September 1957 – 30 September 1957
43rd	Fernando Pámanes Escobedo	PRI		1 October 1957 – ?
44th	Federico Ortíz Armengol	PRI		1 September 1958 – 30 September 1958
44th	Vicente Salgado Páez	PRI		1 October 1958 – 31 October 1958
44th	Francisco Pérez Ríos	PRI		1 November 1958 – 30 November 1958
44th	Emilio Sánchez Piedras	PRI		1 December 1958 – 31 August 1959
44th	Leopoldo González Sáenz	PRI		1 September 1959 – 30 September 1959
44th	Florencio Barrera Fuentes	PRI		1 October 1959 – 31 October 1959
44th	Enrique Gómez Guerra	PRI		1 November 1959 – 30 November 1959
44th	Juan Sabines Gutiérrez	PRI		1 December 1959 – 31 August 1959
44th	Aurelio García Sierra	PRI		1 September 1960 – 30 September 1960
44th	José Luis Martínez Rodríguez	PRI		1 October 1960 – 31 October 1960
44th	José Ortiz Ávila	PRI		1 November 1960 – 30 November 1960
44th	Enrique Sada Baigts	PRI		1 December 1960 – 31 August 1961
45th	Joaquín Noris Saldaña	PRI		1 September 1961 – 30 September 1961
45th	Luis Viñals Carsi	PRI		1 October 1961 – 31 October 1961
45th	Manuel Bernardo Aguirre	PRI		1 November 1961 – 30 November 1961
45th	Francisco Rodríguez Gómez	PRI		1 December 1961 – 31 August 1962
45th	Alfredo Ruiseco Avellaneda	PRI		1 September 1962 – 30 September 1962
45th	Manuel Sodi del Valle	PRI		1 October 1962 – 31 October 1962
45th	Manuel M. Moreno	PRI		1 November 1962 – 30 November 1962
45th	Rodolfo Echeverría Álvarez	PRI		1 December 1962 – 15 March 1963
45th	Filiberto Rubalcaba Sánchez	PRI		15 March 1963 – 17 June 1963
45th	Pío Ortega Grapáin	PRI		17 June 1963 – 31 August 1963
45th	Rómulo Sánchez Miréles	PRI		1 September 1963 – 30 September 1963
45th	Salvador González Lobo	PRI		1 October 1963 – 31 October 1963
45th	José Guadalupe Cervantes Corona	PRI		1 November 1963 – 30 November 1963
45th	Joaquín Gamboa Pascoe	PRI		1 December 1963 – 31 August 1964
46th	Manuel Gurría Ordóñez	PRI	Tabasco 1	1 September 1964 – 30 September 1964
46th	Tomás Algaba Gómez	PRI	Coahuila 1	1 October 1964 – 31 October 1964
46th	Manuel Zárate Aquino	PRI	Oaxaca 6	1 November 1964 – 30 November 1964
46th	Alfonso Martínez Domínguez	PRI	Nuevo León 4	1 December 1964 – 31 August 1965
46th	Augusto Gómez Villanueva	PRI	Aguascalientes 2	1 September 1965 – 30 September 1965
46th	Vicente Fuentes Díaz	PRI	Guerrero 1	1 October 1965 – 31 October 1965
46th	Marta Andrade Del Rosal	PRI	Federal District 12	1 November 1965 – 30 November 1965
46th	Manuel Orijel Salazar	PRI	Federal District 8	1 December 1965 – 31 August 1966
46th	Luz María Zaleta de Elsner	PRI	Quintana Roo	1 September 1966 – 30 September 1966
46th	Miguel Covián Pérez	PRI	Federal District 21	1 October 1966 – 30 October 1966
46th	Luis Dantón Rodríguez	PRI	Guanajuato 1	1 November 1966 – 30 November 1966
46th	Alejandro Carrillo Marcor	PRI	Federal District 17	1 December 1966 – 31 August 1967
47th	Victor Manzanilla Schaffer	PRI	Yucatán 3	1 September 1967 – 30 September 1967
47th	Edgar Robledo Santiago	PRI	Chiapas 3	1 October 1967 – 30 October 1967
47th	Daniel Chowell Cázares	PRI	Guanajuato 1	1 November 1967 – 30 November 1967
47th	Alfonso Martín de Alba	PRI	Jalisco 6	1 December 1967 – 30 August 1968
47th	José de las Fuentes Rodríguez	PRI	Coahuila 1	1 September 1968 – 30 September 1968
47th	Humberto Acevedo Astudillo	PRI	Guerrero 2	1 October 1968 – 30 October 1968
47th	José Arana Morán	PRI	Querétaro 1	1 November 1968 – 30 November 1968
47th	José del Valle de la Cajiga	PRI	Federal District 2	1 December 1968 – 30 August 1969
47th	Luis M. Farías	PRI	Nuevo León 2	1 September 1969 – 30 September 1969
47th	Francisco Padrón Puyou	PRI	San Luis Potosí 2	1 October 1969 – 30 October 1969
47th	Fernando Suárez del Solar	PRI	State of Mexico 3	1 November 1969 – 30 November 1969
47th	Joaquín Gamboa Pascoe	PRI	Federal District 13	1 December 1969 – 31 August 1970
48th	Octavio Sentíes Gómez	PRI	Federal District 4	1 September 1970 – 30 September 1970
48th	José Carlos Osorio Aguilar	PRI	Jalisco 1	1 October 1970 – 31 October 1970
48th	Manuel Orijel Salazar	PRI	Federal District 8	1 November 1970 – 30 November 1970
48th	José F. Rivas Guzmán	PRI		1 December 1970 – 31 August 1971
48th	Luis H. Ducoing Gamba	PRI		1 September 1971 – 30 September 1971
48th	Ramiro Robledo Treviño	PRI		1 October 1971 – 31 October 1971
48th	Santiago Roel García	PRI		1 November 1971 – 30 November 1971
48th	Juan Moisés Calleja García	PRI		1 December 1971 – ?
48th	Renato Vega Alvarado	PRI		16 March 1972 – ?
48th	Celso Humberto Delgado	PRI		1 September 1972 – 30 September 1972
48th	Raymundo Flores Bernal	PRI		1 October 1972 – 31 October 1972
48th	Marcos Manuel Suárez	PRI		1 November 1972 – 30 November 1972
48th	Rafael Rodríguez Barrera	PRI		1 December 1972 – ?
48th	Rafael Castillo Castro	PRI		29 January 1973 – ?
49th	Luis Dantón Rodríguez	PRI		1 September 1973 – ?
49th	María Aurelia de la Cruz Espinosa Ortega	PRI		? – 30 November 1973
49th	Rafael Hernández Ochoa	PRI		1 December 1973 – 31 December 1973
49th	Carlos Sansores Pérez	PRI		1 January 1974 – ?
49th	Fedro Guillén Castañón	PRI		1 September 1974 – 30 September 1974
49th	Concepción Rivera Centeno	PRI		1 October 1974 – 31 October 1974
49th	Jorge Hernández García	PRI		1 November 1974 – 30 November 1974
49th	Píndaro Uriostegui Miranda	PRI		1 December 1974 – ?
49th	Carlos Sansores Pérez	PRI		1 September 1975 – 30 September 1975
49th	Julio Camelo Martínez	PRI		1 October 1975 – 31 October 1975
49th	Mariano Araiza Zayas	PRI		1 November 1975 – 30 November 1975
49th	Luis del Toro Calero	PRI		1 December 1975 – 31 December 1975
49th	Carlos Sansores Pérez	PRI		1 January 1976 – ?
49th	Manuel Ramos Gurrión	PRI		5 May 1976 – ?
49th	Juan José Osorio Palacios	PRI		15 August 1976 – ?
50th	Heladio Ramírez	PRI	Oaxaca 6	1 September 1976 – 30 September 1976
50th	Luis José Dorantes Segovia	PRI		1 October 1976 – 31 October 1976
50th	José Ramírez Gamero	PRI		1 November 1976 – 30 November 1976
50th	Augusto Gómez Villanueva	PRI		1 December 1976 – ?
50th	Juan José Osorio Palacios	PRI	Federal District 15	1 September 1977 – 30 September 1977
50th	Martha Andrade de Del Rosal	PRI		1 October 1977 – 31 October 1977
50th	Victor Manzanilla Schaffer	PRI		1 November 1977 – 30 November 1977
50th	Guillermo Cosío Vidaurri	PRI	Jalisco 1	1 December 1977 – ?
50th	Jorge Efrén Domínguez	PRI		April 1978 – ?
50th	Rodolfo González Guevara	PRI	Federal District 13	1 September 1978 – 30 September 1978
50th	Maximiliano Silerio Esparza	PRI	Durango 2	1 October 1978 – 31 October 1978
50th	Enrique Álvarez del Castillo	PRI		1 November 1978 – 30 November 1978
50th	Antonio Riva Palacio	PRI		1 December 1978 – ?
50th	Luis Priego Ortíz	PRI		May 1979 – ?
51st	Beatriz Elena Paredes Rangel	PRI	Tlaxcala 2	1 September 1979 – 30 September 1979
51st	Fidel Herrera Beltrán	PRI		1 October 1979 – 31 October 1977
51st	Gilberto Muñoz Mosqueda	PRI		1 November 1979 – 30 November 1979
51st	Ignacio Vázquez Torres	PRI		1 December 1979 – ?
51st	Luis M. Farías	PRI	Nuevo León 6	December 1979 – March 1980 – June 1980 – ?
51st	Fernando Ortíz Arana	PRI		August 1980 – ?
51st	Cuauhtémoc Anda Gutiérrez	PRI	Federal District 23	1 September 1980 – 30 September 1980
51st	Ismael Orozco Loreto	PRI		1 October 1980 – 31 October 1980
51st	Rafael Cervantes Acuña	PRI		1 November 1980 – 30 November 1980
51st	José Murat	PRI		1 December 1980 – ?
51st	Angel Aceves Saucedo	PRI		? – August 1981 – ?
51st	Luis M. Farías	PRI	Nuevo León 6	1 September 1981 – 30 September 1981
51st	Hesiquio Aguilar de la Parra	PRI	Veracruz 8	1 October 1981 – 31 October 1981
51st	Rubén Darío Somuano López	PRI	Oaxaca 9	1 November 1981 – 30 November 1981
51st	Marco Antonio Aguilar Cortés	PRI	Michoacán 1	1 December 1981 – 31 August 1982
52nd	Humberto Lugo Gil	PRI	Hidalgo 5	1 September 1982 – 30 September 1982
52nd	Oscar Ramírez Mijares	PRI		1 October 1982 – 31 October 1982
52nd	Mario Vargas Saldaña	PRI	Veracruz 11	1 November 1982 – 30 November 1982
52nd	Mariano Piña Olaya	PRI	Puebla 10	1 December 1982 – 31 August 1983
52nd	Irma Cué de Duarte	PRI	Veracruz 12	1 September 1983 – 30 September 1983
52nd	Víctor Cervera Pacheco	PRI		1 October 1983 – 31 October 1983
52nd	Everardo Gámiz Fernández	PRI		1 November 1983 – 30 November 1983
52nd	Luz Lajous de Madrazo	PRI		1 December 1983 – ?
52nd	Mariano Piña Olaya	PRI		? – February 1984
52nd	Humberto Lugo Gil	PRI		February 1984 – August 1984 – ?
52nd	Netzahualcóyotl de la Vega	PRI	Federal District 34	1 September 1984 – 30 September 1984
52nd	Ricardo Castillo Peralta	PRI		1 October 1984 – 31 October 1984
52nd	Genaro Borrego Estrada	PRI		1 November 1984 – 30 November 1984
52nd	Enrique Soto Izquierdo	PRI		1 December 1984 – ?
53rd	Eliseo Mendoza Berrueto	PRI	Coahuila 1	1 September 1985 – 30 September 1985
53rd	Beatriz Elena Paredes Rangel	PRI	Tlaxcala 1	1 October 1985 – 31 October 1985
53rd	Blas Chumacero	PRI	Puebla 1	1 November 1985 – 30 November 1985
53rd	Fernando Ortíz Arana	PRI	Querétaro 2	1 December 1985 – ?
53rd	Jesús Murillo Karam	PRI		? – April 1986 – ?
53rd	Eliseo Mendoza Berrueto	PRI		? – July 1986 – ?
53rd	Nicolás Reynés Berazaluce	PRI	Tabasco 1	1 September 1986 – 30 September 1986
53rd	Juan Moisés Calleja García	PRI		1 October 1986 – 31 October 1986
53rd	Guillermo Fonseca Alvarez	PRI		1 November 1986 – 30 November 1986
53rd	Reyes Rodolfo Flores Zaragoza	PRI		1 December 1986 – ?
53rd	Mario Murillo Morales	PRI		1987
53rd	Arnulfo Villaseñor Saavedra	PRI		20 April 1987 – ?
53rd	Elba Esther Gordillo	PRI	Federal District 2	1 September 1987 – 30 September 1987
53rd	Santiago Oñate Laborde	PRI	Federal District 25	1 October 1987 – 31 October 1987
53rd	César Augusto Santiago	PRI	Chiapas 2	1 November 1987 – 30 November 1987
53rd	David Jiménez González	PRI		1 December 1987 – 5 August 1988
53rd	Juan José Osorio Palacios	PRI		5 August 1988 – 31 August 1988
54th	Miguel Montes García	PRI	Guanajuato 1	1 September 1988 – 30 September 1988
54th	Mario Vargas Saldaña	PRI	Federal District 30	1 October 1988 – 31 October 1988
54th	Augusto Gómez Villanueva	PRI	Aguascalientes 2	1 November 1988 – 30 November 1988
54th	Socorro Díaz Palacios	PRI	Colima 1	1 December 1988 – 31 December 1988
54th	Mauricio Valdés Rodríguez	PRI	State of Mexico 27	31 December 1988 – 31 October 1989
54th	Guillermo Jiménez Morales	PRI	Federal District 24	1 November 1989 – 30 November 1989
54th	José Luis Lamadrid Sauza	PRI		30 November 1989 – 15 April 1990
54th	Javier López Moreno	PRI	Chiapas 2	15 April 1990 – 14 May 1990
54th	José Murat	PRI	Oaxaca 1	14 May 1990 – 15 June 1990
54th	Humberto Roque Villanueva	PRI	Coahuila 6	15 June 1990 – 15 July 1990
54th	Jesús Hernández Montaño	PRI	Baja California 1	15 July 1990 – 1990
54th	Cuauhtémoc Anda Gutiérrez	PRI	State of Mexico 31	1990 – 30 October 1990
54th	Gonzalo Martínez Corbalá	PRI	San Luis Potosí 6	1 November 1990 – 30 November 1990
54th	Fernando Córdoba Lobo	PRI	Veracruz 8	30 November 1990 – 15 April 1991
54th	Ricardo Monreal Ávila	PRI	Zacatecas 2	15 April 1991 – 14 May 1991
54th	María Claudia Esqueda Llanes	PRI	Federal District 18	14 May 1991 – 15 June 1991
54th	Sami David David	PRI	Chiapas 4	15 June 1991 – 31 October 1991
55th	Fernando Ortíz Arana	PRI		1 November 1991 – 30 November 1991
55th	Rigoberto Ochoa Zaragoza	PRI		1 December 1991 – 11 April 1992
55th	Juan Ignacio Torres Landa	PRI		11 April 1992 – 13 May 1992
55th	Juan Moisés Calleja García	PRI		13 May 1992 – 11 June 1992
55th	Gustavo Carvajal Moreno	PRI		11 June 1992 – 31 October 1992
55th	María de los Ángeles Moreno	PRI		1 November 1992 – 30 November 1992
55th	Guillermo Pacheco Pulido	PRI		1 December 1992 – 5 April 1993
55th	Laura Garza Galindo	PRI		5 April 1993 – 14 May 1993
55th	Jaime Muñoz Domínguez	PRI		14 May 1993 – 10 June 1993
55th	Juan Ramiro Robledo Ruiz	PRI		10 June 1993 – ?
55th	Eberto Croda Rodríguez	PRI		? – July 1993 – ?
55th	Rodolfo Echeverría Ruiz	PRI		16 August 1993 – September 1993 – ?
55th	Hugo Andrés Araujo de la Torre	PRI		1 November 1993 – 30 November 1993
55th	Cuauhtémoc López Sánchez	PRI		1 December 1993 – ?
55th	Juan Antonio Nemi Dib	PRI		19 January 1994 – ?
55th	Francisco Arroyo Vieyra	PRI		18 March 1994 – ?
55th	Pedro Ojeda Paullada	PRI		5 April 1994 – 12 May 1994
55th	Luis Alberto Beauregard Rivas	PRI		12 May 1994 – 14 June 1994
55th	Miguel González Avelar	PRI		1 June 1994 – 30 October 1994
56th	Humberto Roque Villanueva	PRI		1 November 1994 – 30 November 1994
56th	Carlota Vargas Garza	PRI	Nuevo León 3	1 December 1994 – 17 January 1995
56th	Abelardo Carrillo Zavala	PRI		17 January 1995 – 6 March 1995
56th	Netzahualcóyotl de la Vega	PRI		6 March 1995 – 15 March 1995
56th	Saúl González Herrera	PRI	Chihuahua 5	15 March 1995 – 14 April 1995
56th	Sofia Valencia Abundis	PRI	Jalisco 8	14 April 1995 – 17 May 1995
56th	Miguel Ángel Islas Chio	PRI	Hidalgo 5	17 May 1995 – ?
56th	Rosario Guerra Díaz	PRI	Federal District 27	1 September 1995 – 30 September 1995
56th	Pablo Moreno Cota	PRI	Sinaloa 6	1 October 1995 – 31 October 1995
56th	Fernando Salgado Delgado	PRI	Federal District 13	1 November 1995 – 30 November 1995
56th	Óscar Cantón Zetina	PRI	Tabasco 5	1 December 1995 – ?
56th	Ismael Orozco Loreto	PRI		15 March 1996 – 14 April 1996
56th	María Claudia Esqueda Llanes	PRI		14 April 1996 – ?
56th	Salvador Mikel Rivera	PRI		30 July 1996 – August 1996 – ?
56th	Héctor Hugo Olivares Ventura	PRI	Aguascalientes 2	1 September 1996 – 30 September 1996
56th	Melchor de los Santos Ordóñez	PRI		1 October 1996 – 31 October 1996
56th	Heriberto Galindo Quiñones	PRI		1 November 1996 – 30 November 1996
56th	Sara Muza Simón	PRI		1 December 1996 – 15 March 1997
56th	Florentino Castro López	PRI	Federal District 40	15 March 1997 – 14 April 1997
56th	Netzahualcóyotl de la Vega	PRI	Guerrero 3	15 April 1997 – 31 August 1997
57th	Porfirio Muñoz Ledo	PRD		1 September 1997 – 30 September 1997
57th	Eduardo Bernal Martínez	PRI		1 October 1997 – 31 October 1997
57th	Juan Miguel Alcántara Soria	PAN		1 November 1997 – 30 November 1997
57th	Juan José Cruz Martínez	PT		1 December 1997 – 15 December 1997
57th	Arturo Núñez Jiménez	PRI		15 December 1997 – 14 March 1998
57th	Jorge Emilio González	PVEM		15 March 1998 – 14 April 1998
57th	Pablo Sandoval Ramírez	PRD		15 April 1998 – 28 August 1998
57th	Arturo Núñez Jiménez	PRI		1 September 1998 – 30 September 1998
57th	Felipe de Jesús Preciado Coronado	PAN		1 October 1998 – 31 October 1998
57th	Juan José Cruz Martínez	PT		1 November 1998 – 30 November 1998
57th	Gloria Lavara	PVEM		1 December 1998 – 15 December 1998
57th	Juan Marcos Gutiérrez González	PAN		16 December 1998 – 22 December 1998
57th	Porfirio Muñoz Ledo	PRD		22 December 1998 – 15 March 1999
57th	Sergio Valdés Arias	PRD		15 March 1999 – 14 April 1999
57th	Juan Moisés Calleja Castañon	PRI		14 April 1999 – 30 April 1999
57th	Victorio Montalvo Rojas	PRD		31 May 1999 – 31 August 1999
57th	Carlos Medina Plascencia	PAN		1 September 1999 – 30 September 1999
57th	Francisco José Paoli Bolio	PAN		5 October 1999 – 31 August 2000
58th	Ricardo García Cervantes	PAN		1 September 2000 – 31 August 2001
58th	Beatriz Elena Paredes Rangel	PRI		1 September 2001 – 15 December 2002
58th	Eric Eber Villanueva Mukul	PRD		16 December 2002 – 14 March 2003
58th	Armando Salinas Torre	PAN		15 March 2003 – 31 August 2003
59th	Juan de Dios Castro Lozano	PAN		1 September 2003 – 31 August 2004
59th	Manlio Fabio Beltrones Rivera	PRI		1 September 2004 – 31 August 2005
59th	Heliodoro Díaz Escarraga	PRI		1 September 2005 – 31 January 2006
59th	Marcela González Salas	PRD		1 February 2006 – 15 May 2006
59th	Álvaro Elías Loredo	PAN		16 May 2006 – 31 August 2006
60th	Jorge Zermeño Infante	PAN		1 September 2006 – 25 June 2007
60th	María Elena Álvarez Bernal	PAN		26 June 2007 – 31 August 2007
60th	Ruth Zavaleta Salgado	PRD		1 September 2007 – 31 August 2008
60th	César Duarte Jáquez	PRI		1 September 2008 – 31 August 2009
61st	Francisco Javier Ramírez Acuña	PAN		1 September 2009 – 5 September 2010
61st	Jorge Carlos Ramírez Marín	PRI		5 September 2010 – 31 August 2011
61st	Emilio Chuayffet Chemor	PRI		1 September 2011 – 15 December 2011
61st	Guadalupe Acosta Naranjo	PRD		15 December 2011 – 30 April 2012
61st	Óscar Martín Arce Paniagua	PAN		1 May 2012 – 31 August 2012
62nd	Jesús Murillo Karam	PRI		1 September 2012 – 4 December 2012
62nd	Francisco Arroyo Vieyra	PRI		11 December 2012 – 31 August 2013
62nd	Ricardo Anaya Cortés	PAN		1 September 2013 – 6 March 2014
62nd	José González Morfin	PAN		6 March 2014 – 31 August 2014
62nd	Silvano Aureoles Conejo	PRD		1 September 2014 – 26 February 2015
62nd	Tomás Torres Mercado	PVEM		26 February 2015 – 18 March 2015
62nd	Julio César Moreno Rivera	PRD		18 March 2015 – 31 August 2015
63rd	Jesus Zambrano Grijalva	PRD		1 September 2015 – 31 August 2016
63rd	Javier Bolaños Aguilar	PAN		1 September 2016 – 28 February 2017
63rd	Guadalupe Murguía Gutiérrez	PAN		1 March 2017 – 7 September 2017
63rd	Jorge Carlos Ramírez Marín	PRI		7 September 2017 – 1 February 2018
63rd	Edgar Romo García	PRI		1 February 2018 – 31 August 2018
64th	Porfirio Muñoz Ledo	MORENA		1 September 2018 – 5 September 2019
64th	Laura Rojas Hernández	PAN		5 September 2019 – 2 September 2020
64th	Dulce María Sauri Riancho	PRI		2 September 2020 – 31 August 2021
65th	Sergio Gutiérrez Luna	MORENA		1 September 2021 – 31 August 2022
65th	Santiago Creel	PAN		1 September 2022 – 14 August 2023
65th	Noemí Luna Ayala	PAN		14 August 2023 – 31 August 2023
65th	Marcela Guerra Castillo	PRI	Nuevo León 5	1 September 2023 – 31 August 2024
66th	Ifigenia Martínez y Hernández	MORENA		1 September 2024 – 5 October 2024
66th	Sergio Gutiérrez Luna	MORENA	Plurinominal	8 October 2024 – 2 September 2025
66th	Kenia López Rabadán	PAN		2 September 2025 – 31 August 2026
66th	Raúl Bolaños Cacho Cué	PVEM		1 September 2026 - Incumbent
