= XLVII Legislature of the Mexican Congress =

| ← | XLVI | XLVIII | → |
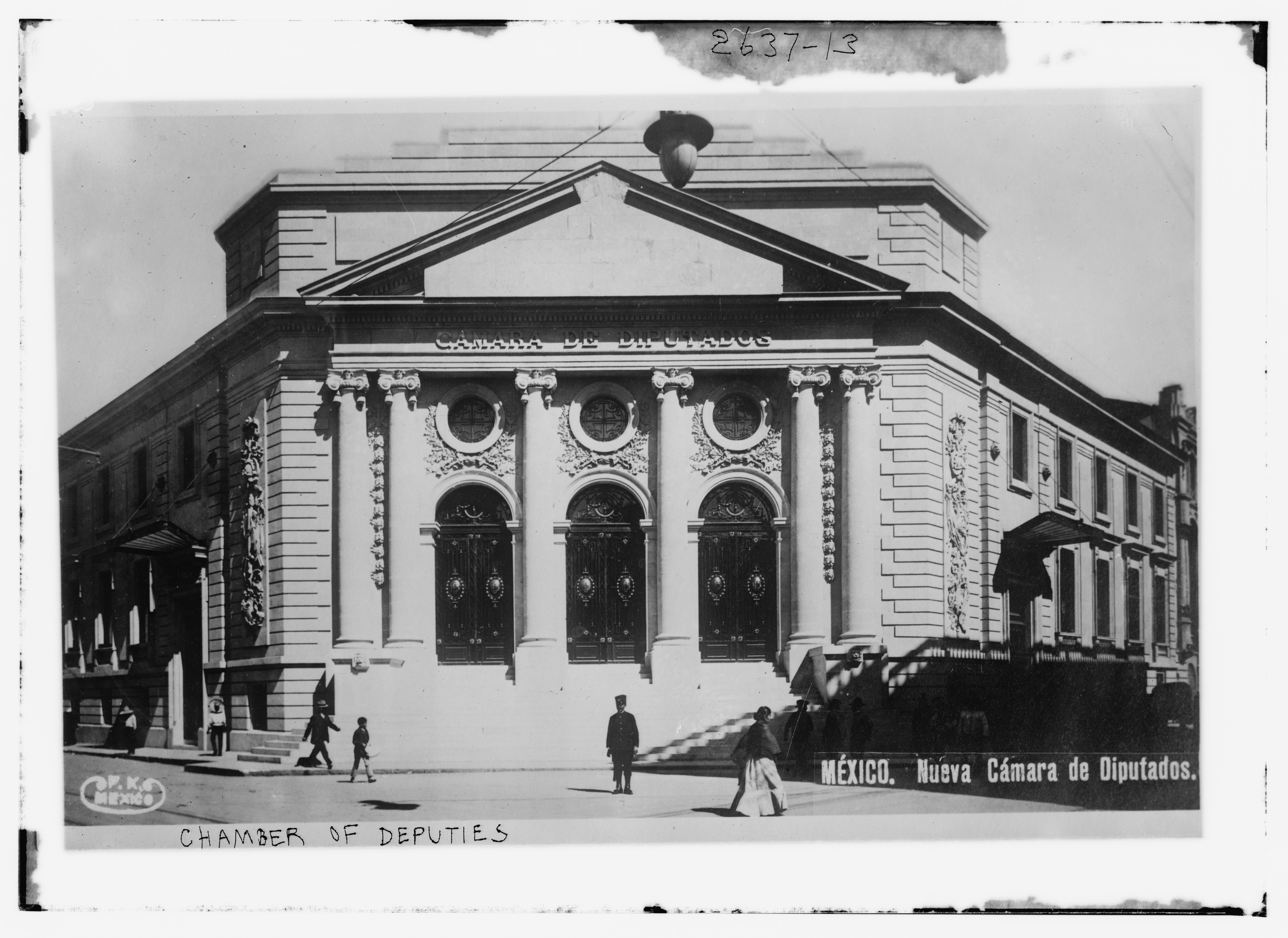
- Legislative Palace of Donceles (1910)

Overview
- Legislative body: Congress of the Union
- Meeting place: Casona de Xicoténcatl (Senators); Legislative Palace of Donceles (Deputies/General Congress)
- Term: 1 September 1967 – 31 August 1970
- Election: 2 July 1967 (Deputies)

Chamber of Senators
- Members: 60: PRI (60)

Chamber of Deputies
- Members: 212: PRI (177); PAN (20); PPS (10); PARM (5)
- President: List: Víctor Manzanilla Schaffer; Edgar Robledo Santiago; Daniel Chowell Cázares; Alfonso de Alba Martín; José de las Fuentes; Humberto Acevedo Astudillo; José Arana Morán; José del Valle de la Cajiga; Luis M. Farías; Francisco Padrón Puyou; Fernando Suárez del Solar; Joaquín Gamboa Pascoe

Sessions
- 1st: 1 September 1967 – 30 December 1967
- 2nd: 1 September 1968 – 31 December 1968
- 3rd: 1 September 1969 – 31 December 1969

Special sessions
- 1st: 20 July 1970 – 29 July 1970

The XLVII Legislature of the Congress of Mexico met from 1 September 1967 to 31 August 1970. Members of the upper house of the Congress were selected in the elections of 5 July 1964 for a period of six years while members of the lower house of the Congress were selected in the elections of 2 July 1967 for a period of three years.

== Senate ==
=== Senators by federative entity ===
| State | Senator | Party | State | Senator | Party |
|---|---|---|---|---|---|
| Aguascalientes | Alberto Alcalá de Lira | Institutional Revolutionary Party | Nayarit | Alfonso Guerra Olivares | Institutional Revolutionary Party |
| Aguascalientes | Luis Gómez Zepeda | Institutional Revolutionary Party | Nayarit | Ricardo Marín Ramos | Institutional Revolutionary Party |
| Baja California | Hermenegildo Cuenca Díaz | Institutional Revolutionary Party | Nuevo León | Armando Arteaga Santoyo | Institutional Revolutionary Party |
| Baja California | José Ricardi Tirado | Institutional Revolutionary Party | Nuevo León | Napoleón Gómez Sada | Institutional Revolutionary Party |
| Campeche | María Lavalle Urbina | Institutional Revolutionary Party | Oaxaca | Rodolfo Sandoval López | Institutional Revolutionary Party |
| Campeche | Carlos Sansores Pérez | Institutional Revolutionary Party | Oaxaca | Raúl Bolaños Cacho Güendulain | Institutional Revolutionary Party |
| Chiapas | Andrés Serra Rojas | Institutional Revolutionary Party | Puebla | Gonzalo Bautista O'Farrill | Institutional Revolutionary Party |
| Chiapas | Arturo Moguel Esponda | Institutional Revolutionary Party | Puebla | Eduerdo Cué Merlo | Institutional Revolutionary Party |
| Chihuahua | Luis L. León | Institutional Revolutionary Party | Querétaro | Eduardo Luque Loyola | Institutional Revolutionary Party |
| Chihuahua | Manuel Bernardo Aguirre | Institutional Revolutionary Party | Querétaro | Manuel Soberanes Muñoz | Institutional Revolutionary Party |
| Coahuila | Eulalio Gutiérrez Treviño | Institutional Revolutionary Party | San Luis Potosí | Juan José González Bustamante | Institutional Revolutionary Party |
| Coahuila | Florencio Barrera Fuentes | Institutional Revolutionary Party | San Luis Potosí | Jesús N. Noyola Zepeda | Institutional Revolutionary Party |
| Colima | Alfredo Ruiseco Avellaneda | Institutional Revolutionary Party | Sinaloa | Manuel Sarmiento Sarmiento | Institutional Revolutionary Party |
| Colima | Jesús Robles Martínez | Institutional Revolutionary Party | Sinaloa | Amado Estrada Rodríguez | Institutional Revolutionary Party |
| Durango | Alberto Terrones Benitez | Institutional Revolutionary Party | Sonora | Juan de Dios Bojórquez | Institutional Revolutionary Party |
| Durango | Cristóbal Guzmán Cárdenas | Institutional Revolutionary Party | Sonora | Alicia Arellano Tapia | Institutional Revolutionary Party |
| Guanajuato | Juan Pérez Vela | Institutional Revolutionary Party | Tabasco | Gustavo Rovirosa Pérez | Institutional Revolutionary Party |
| Guanajuato | Manuel M. Moreno | Institutional Revolutionary Party | Tabasco | Fausto Pintado Borrego | Institutional Revolutionary Party |
| Guerrero | Baltazar R. Leyva Mancilla | Institutional Revolutionary Party | Tamaulipas | Magdaleno Aguilar Castillo | Institutional Revolutionary Party |
| Guerrero | Ezequiel Padilla | Institutional Revolutionary Party | Tamaulipas | Antonio García Rojas | Institutional Revolutionary Party |
| Hidalgo | Oswaldo Cravioto Cisneros | Institutional Revolutionary Party | Tlaxcala | Ignacio Bonilla Vázquez | Institutional Revolutionary Party |
| Hidalgo | Manuel Sánchez Vite | Institutional Revolutionary Party | Tlaxcala | Luciano Huerta Sánchez | Institutional Revolutionary Party |
| Jalisco | Salvador Corona Bandín | Institutional Revolutionary Party | Veracruz | Rafael Murillo Vidal | Institutional Revolutionary Party |
| Jalisco | Filiberto Ruvalcaba Sánchez | Institutional Revolutionary Party | Veracruz | Arturo Llorente González | Institutional Revolutionary Party |
| State of Mexico | Fernando Ordorica Inclán | Institutional Revolutionary Party | Yucatán | Rafael Matos Escobedo | Institutional Revolutionary Party |
| State of Mexico | Mario Olivera Gómez Tagle | Institutional Revolutionary Party | Yucatán | Carlos Loret de Mola Mediz | Institutional Revolutionary Party |
| Michoacán | Jesús Romero Flores | Institutional Revolutionary Party | Zacatecas | Manuel Tello Barraud | Institutional Revolutionary Party |
| Michoacán | Rafael Galván | Institutional Revolutionary Party | Zacatecas | José González Varela | Institutional Revolutionary Party |
| Morelos | Diódoro Rivera Uribe | Institutional Revolutionary Party | Federal District | Luis González Aparicio | Institutional Revolutionary Party |
| Morelos | Antonio Flores Mazari | Institutional Revolutionary Party | Federal District | Jesús Yurén Aguilar | Institutional Revolutionary Party |

== Chamber of Deputies ==
=== Deputies by federal entity ===
Aguascalientes

- 1st. Francisco Guel Jiménez (PRI)
- 2nd. José Refugio Esparza Reyes (PRI)

Baja California

- 1st. Francisco Muñoz Franco (PRI)
- 2nd. Gustavo Aubanel Vallejo (PRI)
- 3rd. Celestino Salcedo Monteón (PRI)

Territory of Baja California Sur

- Ángel César Mendoza Arámburo (PRI)

Campeche

- 1st. Ramón Alcalá Ferrera (PRI)
- 2nd. Manuel Pavón Bahaine (PRI)

Chiapas

- 1st. Martha Luz Rincon Castillejos (PRI)
- 2nd. Roberto Coello Lescieur (PRI)
- 3rd. Edgar Robledo Santiago (PRI)
- 4th. Daniel Robles Sasso (PRI)
- 6th. Patrocinio González Garrido (PRI)

Chihuahua

- 1st. Mariano Valenzuela Ceballos (PRI)
- 2nd. (PRI)
- 3rd. (PRI)
- 4th. (PRI)
- 5th. Everardo Escárcega López (PRI)
- 6th. (PRI)

Coahuila

- 1st. José de las Fuentes Rodríguez (PRI)
- 2nd. (PRI)
- 3rd. (PRI)
- 4th. (PRI)

Colima

- 1st. Ricardo Guzmán Nava (PRI)
- 2nd. Ramiro Santana Ugarte (PRI)

Federal District

- 1st. Pedro Luis Bartilotti Perea (PRI)
- 2nd. José del Valle de la Cajiga (PRI)
- 3rd. Ernesto Quiñones López (PRI)
- 4th. Octavio Andrés Hernández González (PRI)
- 5th. Gilberto Aceves Alcocer (PRI)
- 6th. Ignacio Castillo Mena (PRI)
- 7th. Jorge Durán Chávez (PRI)
- 8th. Eleuterio Macedo Váldez (PRI)
- 9th. Javier Blanco Sánchez (PAN)
- 10th. Manuel Álvarez González (PRI)
- 11th. Pedro Rosas Rodríguez (PRI)
- 12th. Martín Guaida Lara (PRI)
- 13th. Joaquín Gamboa Pascoe (PRI)
- 14th. Alberto Briseño Ruiz (PRI)
- 15th. Enrique Bermúdez Olvera (PRI)
- 16th. Fernando Córdoba Lobo (PRI)
- 17th. Raúl Noriega Ondovilla (PRI)
- 18th. Joaquín del Olmo Martínez (PRI)
- 19th. Adolfo Ruiz Sosa (PRI)
- 20th. Ignacio Guzmán Garduño (PRI)
- 21st. Oscar Ramírez Mijares (PRI)
- 22nd. María Guadalupe Aguirre Soria (PRI)
- 23rd. Hilario Galguera Torres (PRI)
- 24th. María Elena Jiménez Lozano (PRI)

Durango

- 1st. Agustín Ruiz Soto (PRI)
- 2nd. J. Natividad Ibarra Rayas (PRI)
- 3rd. Juan Antonio Orozco Fierro (PRI)
- 4th. José Antonio Ramírez M. (PRI)

Guanajuato

- 1st. (PRI)
- 2nd. (PRI)
- 3rd. (PRI)
- 4th. (PRI)
- 5th. Ignacio Vázquez Torres (PRI)
- 6th. (PRI)
- 7th. (PRI)
- 8th. (PRI)
- 9th. (PRI)

Guerrero

- 1st. Juan Pablo Leyva Córdova (PRI)
- 2nd. Humberto Acevedo Astudillo (PRI)
- 3rd. Alberto Díaz Rodríguez (PRI)
- 4th. Israel Nogueda Otero (PRI)
- 5th. Eusebio Mendoza Avila (PRI)

Hidalgo

- 1st. Adalberto Cravioto Meneses (PRI)
- 2nd. Raúl Vargas Ortiz (PRI)
- 3rd. Sergio Butrón Casas (PRI)
- 4th. José Gonzálo Badillo Ortiz (PRI)
- 5th. Humberto Lugo Gil (PRI)

Jalisco

- 1st. (PRI)
- 2nd. (PRI)
- 3rd. (PRI)
- 4th. (PRI)
- 5th. (PRI)
- 6th. (PRI)
- 7th. (PRI)
- 8th. (PRI)
- 9th. (PRI)
- 10th. (PRI)
- 11th. (PRI)
- 12th. (PRI)

State of Mexico

- 1st. (PRI)
- 2nd. (PRI)
- 3rd. (PRI)
- 4th. Ignacio Pichardo Pagaza (PRI)
- 5th. (PRI)
- 6th. (PRI)
- 7th. (PRI)
- 8th. (PRI)
- 9th. (PRI)

Michoacán

- 1st. (PRI)
- 2nd. (PRI)
- 3rd. (PRI)
- 4th. (PRI)
- 5th. (PRI)
- 6th. (PRI)
- 7th. (PRI)
- 8th. (PRI)
- 9th. (PRI)

Morelos

- 1st. Javier Bello Yllanes (PRI)
- 2nd. Elpidio Perdomo García (PRI)

Nayarit

- 1st. Roberto Gómez Reyes (PRI)
- 2nd. Emilio M. González Parra (PRI)

Nuevo León

- 1st. Pedro F. Quintanilla (PRI)
- 2nd. Luis M. Farías (PRI)
- 3rd. Virgilio Cárdenas García (PRI)
- 4th. Graciano Bortoni Urtega (PRI)
- 5th. Eloy Treviño Martínez (PRI)

Oaxaca

- 1st. (PRI)
- 2nd. (PRI)
- 3rd. (PRI)
- 4th. (PRI)
- 5th. (PRI)
- 6th. (PRI)
- 7th. (PRI)
- 8th. (PRI)
- 9th. (PRI)

Puebla

- 1st. Blas Chumacero Sánchez (PRI)
- 2nd. (PRI)
- 3rd. (PRI)
- 4th. (PRI)
- 5th. (PRI)
- 6th. (PRI)
- 7th. (PRI)
- 8th. (PRI)
- 9th. (PRI)
- 10th. (PRI)

Querétaro

- 1st. José Arana Morán (PRI)
- 2nd. Enrique Redentor Albarrán (PRI)

Territory of Quintana Roo

- Eliezer Castro Souza (PRI)

San Luis Potosí

- 1st. Jorge Márquez Borjas (PRI)
- 2nd. Francisco Padrón Puyou (PRI)
- 3rd. Florencio Salazar Martínez (PRI)
- 4th. Guillermo Fonseca Álvarez (PRI)
- 5th. José de Jesús González L. (PRI)

Sinaloa

- 1st. (PRI)
- 2nd. (PRI)
- 3rd. (PRI)
- 4th. (PRI)

Sonora

- 1st. Ignacio Guzmán Gómez (PRI)
- 2nd. Guillermo Núñez Keith (PRI)
- 3rd. Enrique Fuentes Martínez (PRI)
- 4th. Francisco Villanueva Castelo (PRI)
- 5th. Carlos Armando Biebrich Torres (PRI)

Tabasco

- 1st. Mario Trujillo García (PRI)
- 2nd. Agapito Domínguez Canabal (PRI)

Tamaulipas

- 1st. Antonio Guerra Díaz (PRI)
- 2nd. Cristóbal Guevara Delmas (PRI)
- 3rd. Elías Piña Jesús (PRI)
- 4th. Elvia Rangel de la Fuente (PRI)
- 5th. Candelario Pérez Malibrán (PRI)

Tlaxcala

- 1st. (PRI)
- 2nd. (PRI)

Veracruz

- 1st. (PRI)
- 2nd. (PRI)
- 3rd. (PRI)
- 4th. (PRI)
- 5th. (PRI)
- 6th. (PRI)
- 7th. (PRI)
- 8th. (PRI)
- 9th. (PRI)
- 10th. (PRI)
- 11th. (PRI)
- 12th. (PRI)
- 13th. (PRI)
- 14th. (PRI)

Yucatán

- 1st. (PRI)
- 2nd. (PRI)
- 3rd. Víctor Manzanilla Schaffer (PRI)

Zacatecas

- 1st. Calixto Medina Medina (PRI)
- 2nd. Rosa María Ortiz de Castañeda (PRI)
- 3rd. Antonio Ruelas Cuevas (PRI)
- 4th. Juan Martínez Tobías (PRI)
