= Sergio Gutiérrez Luna =

Mexican politician

Sergio Carlos Gutiérrez Luna
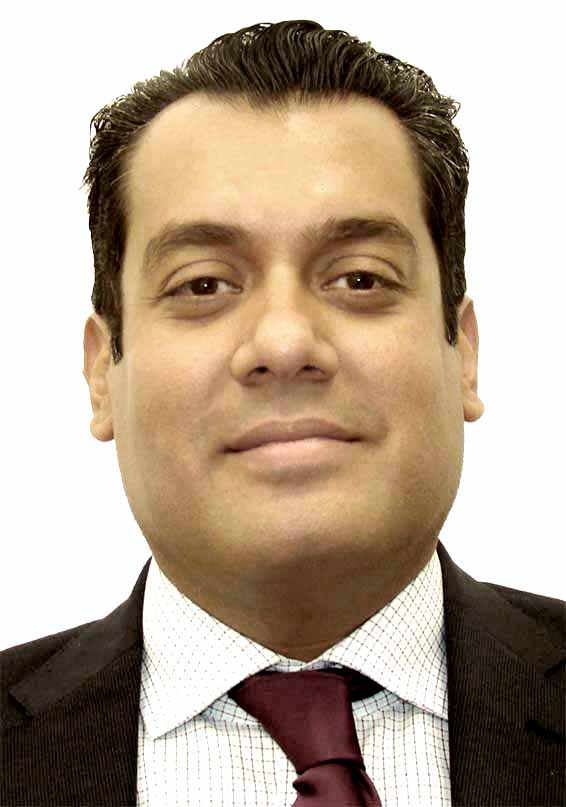
- Official portrait, 2018

President of the Chamber of Deputies of Mexico
- In office 8 October 2024 (Note: Acting: 6–8 October 2025) – 2 September 2025
- Preceded by: Ifigenia Martínez y Hernández
- Succeeded by: Kenia López Rabadán
- In office 1 September 2021 – 31 August 2022
- Preceded by: Dulce María Sauri Riancho
- Succeeded by: Santiago Creel Miranda

Member of the Chamber of Deputies
- Incumbent
- Assumed office 4 December 2018
- Preceded by: Horacio Duarte Olivares
- Constituency: Fifth electoral region

Personal details
- Born: 12 July 1976 (age 50) Minatitlán, Veracruz, Mexico
- Party: Morena (since 2017)
- Other political affiliations: Party of the Democratic Revolution (1989–2017)
- Spouse: Diana Karina Barreras Samaniego
- Education: Escuela Libre de Derecho
- Occupation: Lawyer; Politician

Sergio Carlos Gutiérrez Luna (born 12 July 1976) is a Mexican lawyer and politician from the state of Veracruz. Most recently elected to Congress in the 2024 general election, he served as the President of the Chamber of Deputies from 8 October 2024 to 2 September 2025, following the death of Ifigenia Martínez y Hernández. He previously held the same role from 2021 to 2022.

== Early career ==
Gutiérrez Luna was born in Minatitlán, Veracruz, in 1976. From 1998 to 1999, he served as an advisor in the Central Coordination of Resources at the Tax Administration Service (SAT).

Between 2000 and 2003, during the presidency of Vicente Fox, he worked as the personal secretary to federal deputy and later became the coordinator of advisors in the Senate for the Party of the Democratic Revolution (PRD) during the LVIII Legislature. In 2003, he served as deputy director in the Legal Affairs Unit at the Electoral Institute of Mexico City.

From 2003 to 2011, he practiced law privately in his own firm, specializing in litigation and consulting in electoral and constitutional matters. He returned to public service from 2011 to 2015 as the executive secretary of the Commission for the Implementation of the New Criminal Justice System of Sonora, under Governor Guillermo Padrés Elías. He also served as a councilor in the Judiciary of Sonora from 2014 to 2017.

In 2017, he left the PRD and supported the presidential candidacy of Andrés Manuel López Obrador.

== Chamber of Deputies (2018–present) ==
=== Elections ===
In the 2018 federal election, he was elected as an alternate deputy to Horacio Duarte Olivares, who secured his seat through proportional representation for the fifth electoral region. He was subsequently elected as a deputy by proportional representation for the same electoral region in both the 2021 and 2024 elections.

=== Tenure ===
On 4 December 2018, during the LXIV Legislature, Gutiérrez was sworn in as a deputy after Horacio Duarte Olivares took a leave of absence to assume the role of subsecretary in the Secretariat of Labor and Social Welfare under the López Obrador administration.

=== President of the Chamber of Deputies ===
==== First tenure ====
During an internal election among Morena legislators, Gutiérrez was selected as the nominee for president of the Chamber of Deputies for the 2021–2022 term. His term started on 1 September 2021 and ended on 31 August 2022.

In late 2021, following the Instituto Nacional Electoral's (INE) suspension of the proposed presidential recall referendum due to budget constraints, Gutiérrez filed a complaint with the Attorney General's Office against electoral officials, accusing them of collusion and abuse of authority, and also submitted a complaint regarding administrative irregularities. INE officials unanimously criticized this action, asserting that it undermined the independence of the organization.

Amidst the Russian invasion of Ukraine, Gutiérrez condemned the request by U.S. Congressman Vicente González to revoke the visas of Mexican legislators who were part of the Mexico-Russia Friendship Group. In a public statement, Gutiérrez asserted that the request constitutes a direct intervention in the constitutional powers of the legislators.

His tenure faced criticism from various legislators due to his absences.

==== Second tenure ====
At the beginning of the LXVI Legislature, Gutiérrez was elected as vice president of the Board of Directors of the Chamber of Deputies. Following the death of President Ifigenia Martínez y Hernández, he served as acting president. On 7 October 2024, Morena nominated him for the presidency, and he was elected on 8 October, to serve the remainder of the 2024–2025 term.

== Electoral representative ==
For the 2023-2024 electoral process, presidential candidate Claudia Sheinbaum appointed Gutiérrez as the Morena Representative to the Instituto Nacional Electoral (INE) to defend the party's candidates. In this role, he advocated for the disqualification of Francisco García Cabeza de Vaca and Ricardo Anaya, both from the National Action Party's (PAN) proportional representation list for the Chamber of Deputies and Senate, respectively, citing their status as fugitives. While García Cabeza de Vaca was successfully disqualified, Anaya's disqualification was not upheld, as the Federal Electoral Tribunal did not identify an active arrest warrant against him.
