= Beatriz Paredes Rangel =

Mexican politician

Beatriz Paredes
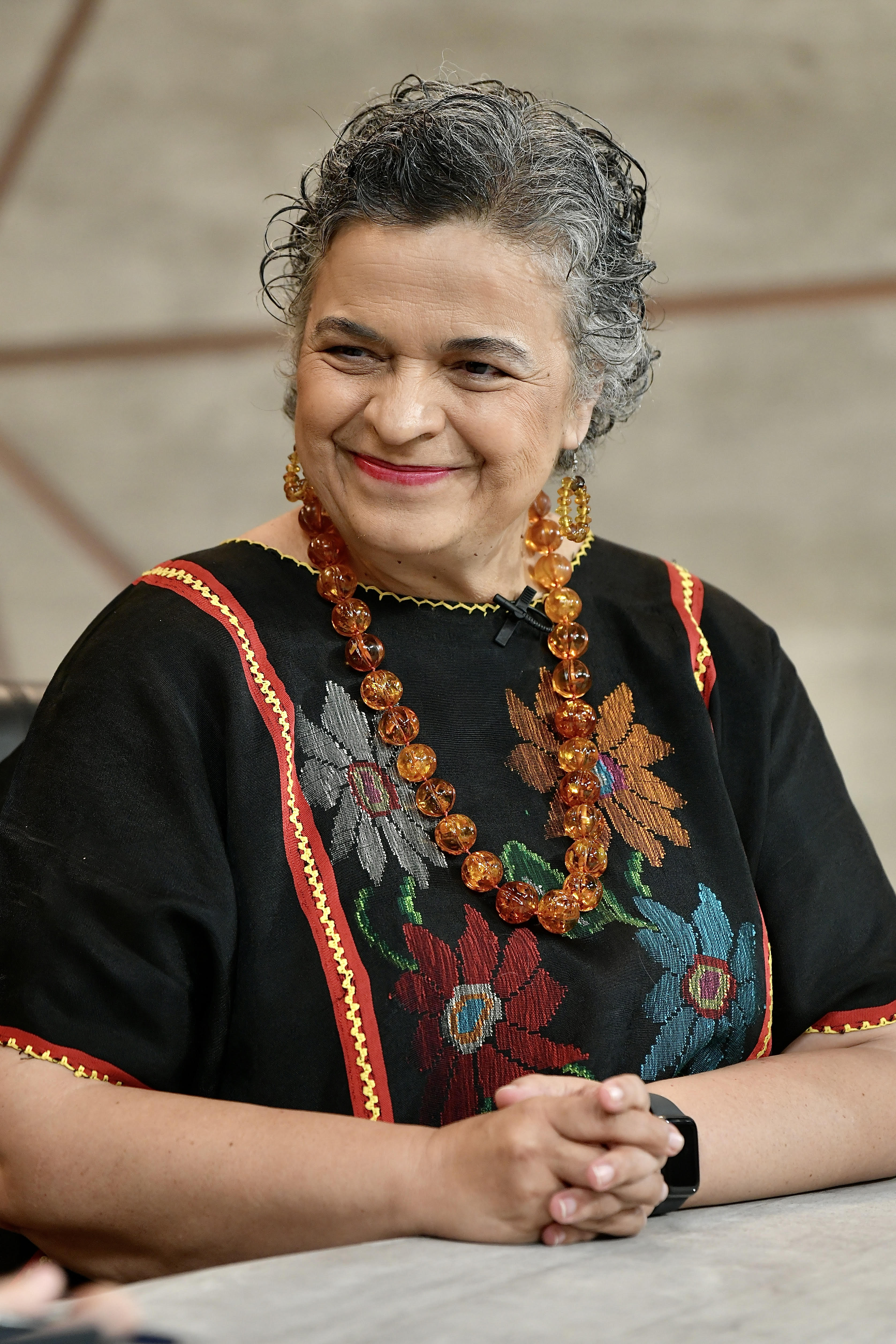
- Paredes in 2024

President of the Institutional Revolutionary Party
- In office 4 March 2007 – 4 March 2011
- Preceded by: Mariano Palacios Alcocer
- Succeeded by: Humberto Moreira Valdés

President of the Chamber of Deputies
- In office 1 September 2001 – 15 December 2002
- Preceded by: Ricardo García Cervantes
- Succeeded by: Eric Eber Villanueva Mukul
- In office 1 October 1985 – 31 October 1985
- Preceded by: Eliseo Mendoza Berrueto
- Succeeded by: Blas Chumacero
- In office 1 September 1979 – 30 September 1979
- Preceded by: Antonio Riva Palacio
- Succeeded by: Fidel Herrera Beltrán

Ambassador of Mexico to Cuba
- In office 6 February 1993 – 26 February 1993
- President: Carlos Salinas de Gortari
- Preceded by: Mario Moya Palencia
- Succeeded by: Carlos Tello Macías

Governor of Tlaxcala
- In office 15 January 1987 – 11 April 1992
- Preceded by: Tulio Hernández Gómez
- Succeeded by: Samuel Quiroz de la Vega

Personal details
- Born: 18 August 1953 (age 73) San Esteban Tizatlán, Tlaxcala, Mexico
- Party: PRI
- Education: UNAM

Beatriz Elena Paredes Rangel (born 18 August 1953) is a Mexican politician who served as president of the Institutional Revolutionary Party (PRI) from 2007 to 2011. She was the first woman to serve as Governor of Tlaxcala and the second woman to serve as a state governor in Mexican history. She unsuccessfully mounted candidacies for Head of the Federal District (Mexico City) in 2006 and 2012.

== Early life and education ==
Beatriz Elena Paredes Rangel was born on 18 August 1953 in San Esteban Tizatlán, Tlaxcala, Mexico. She is the daughter of politician Higinio Paredes Ramos. She studied sociology at the National Autonomous University of Mexico (UNAM), ultimately graduating in 2016 after 30 years of academic studies. Paredes Rangel later received a postgraduate degree in Latin American Literature from the University of Barcelona.

== Career ==
=== Tlaxcala politics ===
She began her political career at the age of 21 as a Tlaxcala state deputy, serving from 1974 to 1977. She served as advisor for the Governor of Tlaxcala from 1978 to 1980. In 1982, she was appointed Undersecretary for Agrarian Reform by President Miguel de la Madrid.

In 1987, she was elected Governor of Tlaxcala at the age of 33. Her election made her the second female governor in Mexico's history, after Griselda Alvarez, who served as Governor of Colima. She served in the position until 1992.

=== National politics ===
In 1992, she was nominated for the position of PRI secretary-general, replacing Luis Donaldo Colosio Murrieta. Her nomination made her the first woman nominated for national leadership in the PRI.

President Carlos Salinas appointed her Ambassador to Cuba in 1993. Paredes served in the Chamber of Deputies and in the Senate, and was President of the Chamber of Deputies from 2001 to 2002.

Paredes has occupied different positions in the PRI, mostly representing the rural and indigenous wings of the party. She ran for the presidency of her party in 2002, but lost to Roberto Madrazo in a contested race. In 2007, she ran again for the party's presidency and won by a large margin. She resigned from the position in 2011 and was succeeded by Humberto Moreira.

Paredes was previously ambassador of Mexico to Brazil. As of 2024, she is a member of the Senate. She ran for President in the 2024 election, but lost the Fuerza y Corazón por México primary to Xóchitl Gálvez.

=== Mexico City politics ===
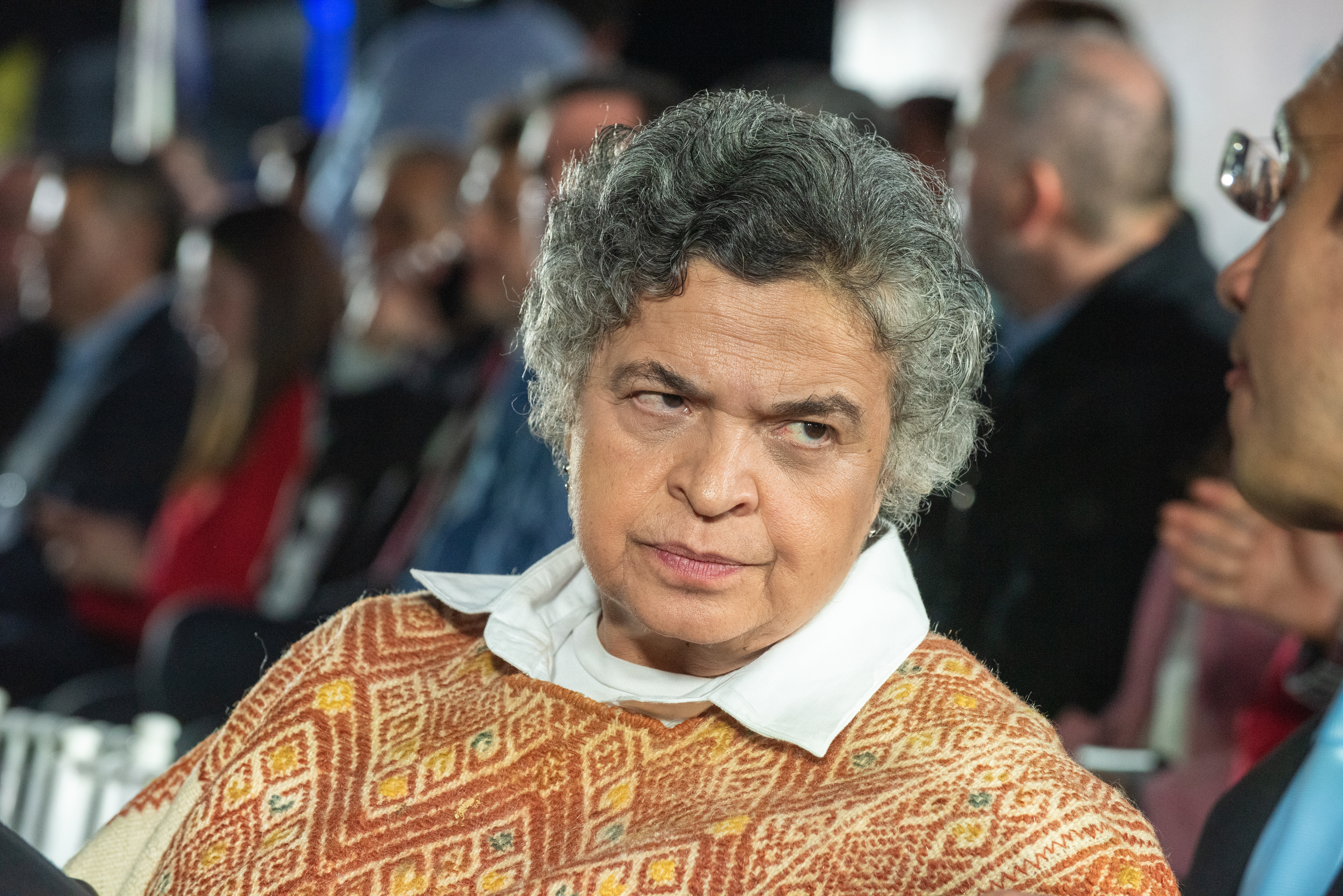
Paredes Rangel in 2023

In the 2006 Federal District election, she ran for Head of Government (mayor) of Mexico City, representing an alliance of the PRI and the PVEM; she lost the election against Marcelo Ebrard. In 2012, she unsuccessfully ran for Head of Government, losing to PRD candidate Miguel Ángel Mancera.

== Political views ==
In 2010, Paredes expressed her support for the recognition of same-sex unions in Mexico after Mexico City legalized same-sex marriage. On 5 October 2009, she publicly acknowledged her interest in running for President of Mexico in 2012, and stated she is pro-choice on abortion issues.

== Other activities ==
She is a member of the Inter-American Dialogue, a Washington D.C.–based think tank.

Political offices
Preceded by Antonio Riva Palacio	President of the Chamber of Deputies; 1979	Succeeded by Fidel Herrera Beltrán
Preceded by Eliseo Mendoza Berrueto	President of the Chamber of Deputies; 1985	Succeeded by Blas Chumacero
Preceded by Tulio Hernández Gómez	Governor of Tlaxcala; 1987–1992	Succeeded by Samuel Quiroz de la Vega
Preceded by Ricardo García Cervantes	President of the Chamber of Deputies; 2001–2002	Succeeded by Ricardo García Cervantes
Diplomatic posts
Preceded by Mario Moya Palencia	Mexican Ambassador to Cuba; 1993	Succeeded by Carlos Tello Macías
Party political offices
Preceded by Mariano Palacios Alcocer	President of the Institutional Revolutionary Party; 2007–2011	Succeeded by Humberto Moreira Valdés
