= Felipe Vicencio Álvarez =

Mexican politician

- Born: 26 December 1959; Mexico City, Mexico
- Died: 12 October 2012 (aged 52)
- Occupation: Politician
- Political party: PAN

Felipe de Jesús Vicencio Álvarez (Note: In this Mexican name, the surname is Vicencio and the second or maternal family name is Álvarez.) (26 December 1959 – 12 October 2012) was a Mexican politician affiliated with the National Action Party (PAN). He served in the Senate for the state of Jalisco during the 58th and 59th sessions of Congress (2000–2006), and in the Chamber of Deputies for Jalisco's 6th congressional district during the 57th session (1997–2000).

He was the son of Abel Vicencio Tovar and María Elena Álvarez Bernal, both prominent members of the PAN.

Vicencio Álvarez died on 12 October 2012 at the age of 52.
