= Luis M. Farías =

Mexican politician

Luis Marcelino Farías Martínez
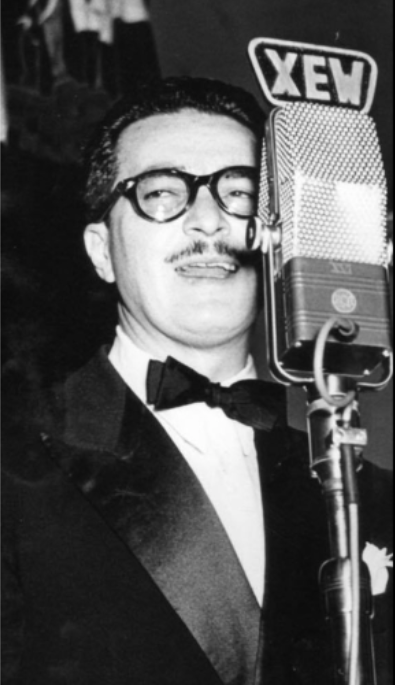
- Luis M. Farías on radio station XEW

President of the Chamber of Deputies
- In office 1 September 1981 – 30 September 1981
- Preceded by: José Murat Casab
- Succeeded by: Hesiquio Aguilar de la Parra
- In office 1 September 1969 – 30 September 1969
- Preceded by: José del Valle de la Cajiga
- Succeeded by: Francisco Padrón Puyou

Deputy of the Congress of the Union for the 6th district of Nuevo León
- In office 1 September 1979 – 31 August 1982
- Preceded by: Jesús Puente Leyva
- Succeeded by: Jorge A. Treviño Martínez

Deputy of the Congress of the Union for the 2nd district of Nuevo León
- In office 1 September 1967 – 31 August 1970
- Preceded by: Pedro Reyes Velázquez
- Succeeded by: Francisco Cerda Muñoz

Deputy of the Congress of the Union for the 16th district of the Federal District
- In office 1 September 1955 – 31 August 1958
- Preceded by: Ramón Cabrera Cosío
- Succeeded by: Rubén Marín y Kall

Personal details
- Born: 7 June 1920 Monterrey, Nuevo León, Mexico
- Died: 3 April 1999 (aged 78) Cuautla, Morelos, Mexico
- Party: PRI
- Education: UNAM

Luis M. Farías (7 June 1920 – 3 April 1999) was a Mexican politician affiliated with the Institutional Revolutionary Party (PRI) who served as governor of Nuevo León from 1971 to 1973 and mayor of Monterrey from 1986 to 1988. He served as a federal deputy in the 43rd, 47th and 51st sessions of Congress, representing electoral districts in both the Federal District and Nuevo León.

He was the president of the Chamber of Deputies in 1969 and 1981.

He was an officer of the Legion of Honor (France) and a grand cross of the Order of Merit of the German Republic.
