= Gloria Lavara =

Mexican politician

President of the Chamber of Deputies
- In office 1 December 1998 – 15 December 1998
- Preceded by: Juan Cruz Martínez
- Succeeded by: Juan Marcos Gutiérrez González

Personal details
- Born: Gloria Ángela Bertha Lavara Mejía; 9 December 1971 (age 54) Mexico City, Mexico
- Party: PVEM
- Occupation: Politician

Gloria Ángela Bertha Lavara Mejía (born 9 December 1971) is a Mexican politician affiliated with the Ecologist Green Party of Mexico. As of 2014 she served as Senator of the LVIII and LIX Legislatures of the Mexican Congress representing the Federal District and as Deputy of the LVII and LX Legislatures.
