= Dulce María Sauri Riancho =

Mexican politician (born 1951)

Dulce Maria Sauri Riancho
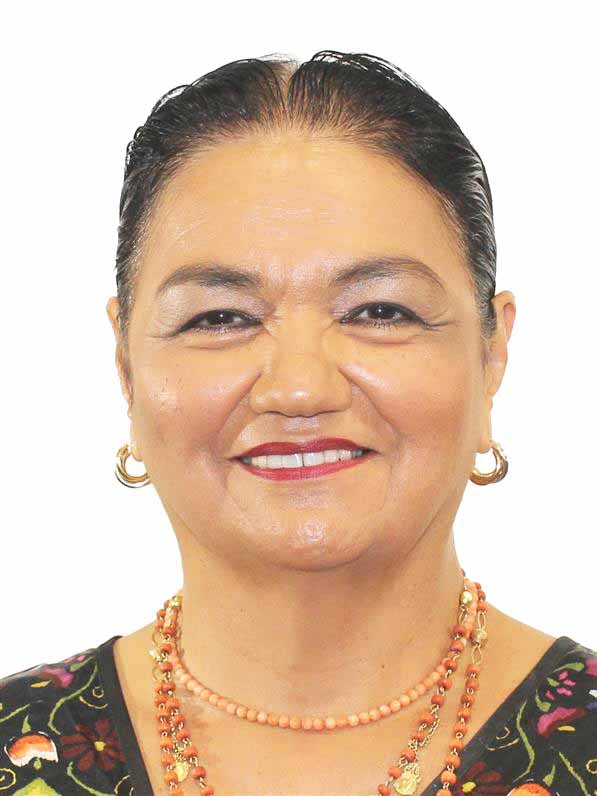

President of the Chamber of Deputies
- In office 2 September 2020 – 31 August 2021
- Preceded by: Laura Rojas Hernández
- Succeeded by: Sergio Gutiérrez Luna

Governor of Yucatán Interim
- In office 14 February 1991 – 1 December 1993
- Preceded by: Víctor Manzanilla Schaffer
- Succeeded by: Ricardo Ávila Heredia

Senator Proportional Representation
- In office 1 September 2000 – 31 August 2006

Personal details
- Born: 14 August 1951 (age 74) Mérida, Yucatán, Mexico
- Party: PRI
- Spouse: José Luis Sierra Villarreal

Dulce María Sauri Riancho (Note: In this Mexican name, the surname is Sauri and the second or maternal family name is Riancho.) (born 14 August 1951) is a Mexican politician who was the first woman to serve as governor of Yucatán, from 1991 to 1994. She served as a congresswoman during the 64th Congress (2018–2021), during which she was also the President of the Chamber of Deputies (equivalent to the speaker in other countries). During her tenure as governor, reforms which restructured the Henequen industry in Yucatán were implemented. The toll road between Mérida and Cancún was also built and became operational during her administration.

== Life and political career ==
Dulce María Sauri was born in Mérida, Yucatán, in 1951. She studied sociology at the Universidad Iberoamericana. Between 1977 and 1982, she worked in the Federal Public Administration in various capacities: Social Programming Technical Assistance Plan (1975–1977); State of Coahuila, Ministry of Programming and Budget (1977–1979); Outreach Program Coordinator for Integrated Rural Development Programme (PIDER) (1979–1982) and head of Ministry of Planning and Budget Evaluation Unit for Yucatán (1979–1982).

She has been an active member of the Institutional Revolutionary Party (PRI) since 1981. She has served in the Congress of Yucatán and as a federal deputy in the lower house of Congress (for Yucatán's 4th district, 1982–85). Between 1988 and 1991, she served in the Senate, representing Yucatán. After her tenure as governor of Yucatán (1991–1994), she returned to the lower house of Congress between 1994 and 1996. She served as the coordinator of the National Programme for Women between 1995–2000 and simultaneously served on the National Commission for Women between 1996 and 1999. She served as the president of the Inter-American Commission of Women (CIM) of the Organization of American States from 1998–2000.

Sauri became national president of the PRI in 1999 and though she lost the presidency in the 2000 election, she refused to step down and remained as party president until 2002. Sauri served in the upper house of the federal Congress from 2000 to 2006. During her tenure in the Senate, she served as Chair of the Asia Pacific Foreign Relations Committee. She was also a member of the Foreign Relations Committee, the North American Foreign Relations Committee, and the Finance and Public Credit Committee.

In the 2018 general election she was elected to the Chamber of Deputies as a proportional representation deputy for the third electoral region.
