= Noemí Luna Ayala =

Mexican politician (born 1984)

Member of the Chamber of Deputies
- Incumbent
- Assumed office 1 September 2021

Personal details
- Born: 9 June 1984 (age 41) Zacatecas, Zacatecas, Mexico
- Party: National Action Party

Noemí Berenice Luna Ayala (born 9 June 1984) is a Mexican politician serving as a plurinominal member of the Chamber of Deputies since 2021. In August 2023, she served as president of the Chamber.
