= Ricardo García Cervantes =

Mexican politician

President of the Chamber of Deputies
- In office 1 September 2000 – 31 August 2001
- Preceded by: Francisco José Paoli Bolio
- Succeeded by: Beatriz Paredes Rangel

Personal details
- Born: 4 October 1954 (age 71) Torreón, Coahuila, Mexico
- Party: PAN
- Occupation: Diplomat, Deputy and Senator

Ricardo Francisco García Cervantes (born 4 October 1954) is a Mexican politician affiliated with the PAN. As of 2013 he served as Senator of the LX and LXI Legislatures of the Mexican Congress representing Coahuila. He also served as Deputy during the LVIII Legislature and also as President of the Chamber of Deputies between 1 September 2000 and 31 August 2001.

He was appointed to Ambassador of Mexico to Costa Rica between 2002 and 2004.
