= Plan of Cuernavaca =

1834 declaration which heralded Mexican president Santa Anna's dictatorship

In the history of Mexico, the Plan of Cuernavaca (Spanish: Plan de Cuernavaca) was a declaration made in Cuernavaca on 25 May 1834 in opposition to reform measures by the liberal administration of Vice President Valentín Gómez Farías. Presumably the declaration was orchestrated by President Antonio López de Santa Anna in agreement with the high clergy. After the triumph of the Plan of Cuernavaca, all laws enacted by the progressives during ten months in office were repealed, the Pontifical and National University of Mexico was reopened, Congress was dissolved and the officials who implemented the reform measures were dismissed. Santa Anna's first dictatorship began. A year later, the conservative faction of the Congress approved the basis for the new constitution that gave rise to the centralist regime in Mexico.

== Background ==
In March 1833, Antonio López de Santa Anna was elected for the first time as President and Valentín Gómez Farías as Vice-President of Mexico. They alternated leadership of the executive branch due to the frequent absences of Santa Anna, sometimes so that he could personally suppress uprisings, and other times to "restore his failing health." His pattern of attaining the presidency and then not serving was set for subsequent decades.

While Vice President Gómez Farías was at the head of government, he implemented reform measures affecting the interests of both the army and the Catholic Church consistent with liberal ideas of equality before the law. Both institutions held special privileges (fueros). A law was proposed to expand the militias controlled by the States, which would relieve the federal budget which funded the army. This law, and a discussion about disposal of church property by the States, led to the rebellions of Escalada and Durán in support of "Religion and privileges." Santa Anna asked Congress for permission to take command of the army and combat the rebels. In response to these rebellions, in June 1833 Congress passed the Ley del Caso (Case Law) that ordered opponents of the reform regime into exile.

In November 1833, Congress issued a decree that ordered dissolution of army corps that had rebelled against federal institutions.

In ecclesiastical matters, the Gómez Farías reforms rescinded mandatory tithing, a ten percent tax of agriculture whose revenues supported the Catholic Church; the hospitals and farms of the Philippines missionaries were placed in charge of the Federation, and the College of Santa María de Todos Santos and the Pontifical and National University of Mexico were closed. In its place, the Department of Public Instruction for the Federal District and Territories was created. Congress ordered creation of primary schools, schools for secular education of primary school teachers, and schools for women and girls, all of which were aimed at broadening access to education beyond elite men. The property of the California missions was secularized.

On 17 December 1833, Congress issued a decree that authorized the government rather than the Catholic hierarchy to fill parish vacancies. This was exercised in some States in the same way that the viceroys had used the power of royal patronage, an assertion of state power not recognized by the papacy after Mexican independence in 1821. Bishops and governors of bishoprics who did not comply with this decree would be fined on the first two occasions, and banished from the country after a third offense.

In Jalisco and Tamaulipas, government funding of religion was declared. In Durango and the State of Mexico the governors exercised their patronage over ecclesiastical posts. In Michoacán the local legislature regulated observance of the canons and discipline of the clergy. Religious tolerance was declared in Yucatán.

On 13 March 1834 there was an earthquake, with aftershocks on 15 and 21 March, and on 24 March there was a severe thunderstorm with hail and water saturated with sulfur. These events were interpreted as "divine signs" by some priests, who urged the population to oppose the new reform laws.

== Resistance by clergy, supported by Santa Anna ==
In November 1833, Santa Anna asked Congress for permission to be absent for six months to address his "failing health" at his hacienda of Manga Clavo. There he received and heard complaints from the conservative opponents of Vice President Valentín Gómez Farías's reform regime, including a letter from the Bishop of Puebla, Francisco Pablo Vázquez, who called the law of 17 December "a sacrilegious statement against the divine authority of the Pope." Meanwhile, the Bishop of Monterrey, José María de Jesús Belaunzarán y Ureña, announced he was willing to pay the fines and suffer exile before enforcing the new law. The Bishop of Chiapas, Luis García Guillén, Governor of the Guadalajara bishopric, Diego de Aranda y Carpinteiro, governor of Oaxaca bishopric, Florencio del Castillo, and the Bishop of Michoacán, Juan Cayetano Gómez de Portugal y Solís refused to obey the law of December 17. In contrast, the governor of Sonora bishopric, Orrantia Francisco, and the governor of Yucatán bishopric, José María Meneses, were willing to obey the reform laws. Later the first was disowned and deposed, while the second asked to exculpate himself before the council.

In a reversal of his previous stance as a liberal, Santa Anna took the side that defended the interests of the Church. On 12 March 1834 he sent a long letter to Gómez Farías expressing dissatisfaction with the directives and agreements that the government had made. On 20 April 1834, the town of Orizaba opposed the decree of the local Legislature that ordered the convents of San José de Gracia and del Carmen to be closed. A rebellion there took some lives but failed to prevent enforcement of the law. Two days later, Congress enacted a 30-day extension before the law of 17 December would be rigidly enforced, after which bishops, councils or governors of bishoprics who did not comply would lose their posts and would be expelled from the country.

On 24 April 1834, before the expiration of his six-months leave, Santa Anna returned to Mexico City. Five days later he published a manifesto in which he informed the public of the bitter division between reformist liberals and conservatives and declared himself impartial and ready to enforce the Constitution to preserve the rights of citizens. In the first days of May, he issued a decree for the people of Veracruz to return to order, restoring local authorities. He ordered the disarmament of the civic militia in face of protests by their commander, Lucas Balderas, and suggested to Congress that they should abolish the Ley del Caso. Dismayed, the members of the Chamber sent a delegation to ask the President whether or not they had the freedom to legislate. Santa Anna replied, "they have, but to do what is right and no more, because I make the Constitution with one hand and in the other hold the sword to ensure it is observed. I had the resolution to attack tyranny, and I will have the resolution to fight demagogy." Given this response, on 15 May Congress decided to suspend its activities since it lacked freedom, "reserving the right to continue at such the time as it saw fit." Congress based its decision on Article 69 of the Rules of Procedure and prorogued its session. Despite that Santa Anna decided to summon the Congress for 21 May, show he was not averse to the legislature power.

== Proclamation of the plan of Cuernavaca ==
On 16 May 1834, in Xalapa and Coatepec, Santa Anna was proclaimed "protector of the Catholic religion." On 23 May, in Oaxaca, he was proclaimed "sustainer of religion and freedom of the country". Finally, on 25 May in the town of Cuernavaca, Ignacio Echeverria and José Mariano Campos proclaimed the Plan of Cuernavaca, containing five articles that demanded:

1. Repeal the Ley del Caso and nontolerance of the influence of Masonic lodges.
2. Declare void the laws passed by Congress and the local legislatures.
3. Request the protection of President Santa Anna to fulfill the plan and recognize him as the only authority.
4. Remove from office the deputies and officials who carried out enforcement of the reform laws and decrees.
5. Provide military force to support the president in implementing the plan.

The plan and its declaration had been orchestrated by José María Tornel, governor of the Federal District. On the day that the plan was announced, Tornel issued a decree subjecting the press to censorship and making it a crime to publish posters that offended the regime. Tornel ensured that news of support for the plan by other garrisons was given full publicity. The plan was followed a week later by the "Plan of Toluca", issued by the garrison of the State of Mexico, which threw out the governor and the federalist state legislature.

Between 25 May and 11 June the following towns issued declarations in support of the Plan of Cuernavaca and of safeguarding the Catholic religion: Tlaxcala; Huitzuco; Chignahuapan; Mazatepec, Morelos; Iguala; Chiautempan, Tlaxcala; Zacapoaxtla; Huejotzingo; Tepecoacuilco de Trujano; Ixtlahuaca de Rayón; Santa María Nativitas; Tlacotepec; San Agustín del Palmar; Tenancingo, Mexico State; Toluca; Tecualoya; San Salvador el Verde; San Martín Texmelucan; Misantla, Veracruz; Tehuacán, Puebla; San Luis Huexotla; Malinalco, State of Mexico; San Andrés Tuxtla; Teotitlan del Valle, Oax.; Teziutlán; Joquicingo; Colima; San Juan Teotihuacán; San Pablo del Monte; Aquixtla; Otumba de Gómez Farías; Apan; Coronango; Totolapan; San Martín Xaltocan; Todos Santos Zempoala, Tulancingo; Chalco; Santa María Ozumba; Santiago Tetla; San |Nicolás Panotla]]; Jiutepec; San Ildefonso Hueyotlipan; Cuautitlán; Azcapotzalco; Santa Inés Zacatelco; Maravatío; Iguala; Tepotzotlán; Santa Ana Monte Alto; Tula; Tlalmanalco; Tlayacapan; San Andrés Chalchicomula; Tepeaca; Santa María Tultepec; San Salvador Atenco; Tenango Tepopola; Contepec; Xochitepec; Singuilucan; Tianguismanalco; Ixtapaluca; Amecameca; Cadereyta; Ixmiquilpan; San Juan del Río; Tecali; Coyoacán; Zimapán; Atlixco; Santo Domingo Mixcoac, Actopan, Mineral de Cardonal; Acatzingo; Atotonilco el Grande, San Ángel, D.F., Tacubaya; San Pedro Tolimán, Tlaxcoapan, Santiago de Querétaro; Santiago Tulyehualco; Tacuba; San Agustín Tlaxco; Pachuca; Celaya; Irapuato, Guanajuato; Huascazaloya, and the parish of Santa Catarina Mártir in Mexico City.

The pronouncements were not uniform. Sometimes they specifically said they only wanted to throw out the religious reforms, but wanted to retain the federal form of government. The wave of supporting proclamations gave Santa Anna the justification he needed to close Congress and repeal the unpopular legislation. The lack of support for the Congress indicated that the general population, with its traditional support for religion, considered that Congress no longer represented their views and resented its exercise of power.

When members of the Chamber wanted to meet, they found that the room keys had been collected and that the doors were guarded by an armed force. In response to the demands of the legislators, Santa Anna replied that the meetings could not continue beyond the period specified by the Constitution. On 1 June he defined his position in another public manifesto, which expressed willingness to defend the people's wishes to maintain the Catholic religion unharmed, saying he had "begged" to the Chambers to repeal the laws to stop the upheavals and religious fears.

Nine days after the Plan of Cuernavaca had been published, the Church agreed to pay Santa Anna from 30,000 to 40,000 pesos monthly as long as church privileges were maintained. On 12 June, Santa Anna dissolved the council and announced his decision to adopt the Plan of Cuernavaca. The church bells pealed and signs were posted reading "Long Live Religion and the illustrious Santa Anna." On 14 June, the new council of the capital supported the president's decision. The same day, Bishop Juan Cayetano Gómez de Portugal led Mass at the Metropolitan Cathedral in Mexico City and sang the Te Deum.

== Reactions and consequences ==
Several municipalities in the country continued to adhere to the plan and support the decision of Santa Anna. On 24 June in Mexico City, Santa Anna abolished the law of Ecclesiastical Trusts issued on 17 December 1833 and ratified on 24 April 1834.

At the same time he appointed Juan Cayetano Gómez de Portugal y Solís as Secretary of Justice and Ecclesiastical Affairs in place of liberal Andrés Quintana Roo. On 9 July he issued a call for election of new Members of Congress. On 26 July he approved the appointment of the bishop of Yucatán, José María Guerra y Rodríguez Correa. Two days later he suspended the arrest warrant issued against Lucas Alamán and the process that was being followed against Anastasio Bustamante for the murder of Vicente Guerrero.On 30 July, repealed the Ley del Caso. On 1 August he ordered restoration of the Pontifical and National University of Mexico. On 8 August, he ordered the reinstatement of the judges of the Supreme Court who had been dismissed in March. A month later, on 8 September 1834, Valentin Gomez Farias went into exile in Mexico en route to New Orleans.

Events in the city of Puebla followed a different course. Before the proclamation of the Plan of Cuernavaca, the civic militia had proclaimed a local plan to support the Catholic religion and had urged the local legislature to declare the same. Although some deputies joined with the militia's wishes, President Pedro Pablo Carrillo was not in the room, so a picket of militia forced him to attend the sessions. The Congress of Puebla refused to deliberate until the militia had been withdrawn. The deputies decided not to accept the plan announced by the militia and decided to keep the reform institutions "even at the cost of a bloody war." Meanwhile, Santa Anna tried to overthrow the state government. The governor, Cosme Furlong, had only three thousand men, who were besieged by federal troops of General Luis Quintanar with seven thousand troops and thirty guns. On 13 and 29 June the besiegers made assaults that were repelled, but on 5 July they managed to occupy the Inns of Cristo and the Roncal. On 16 July, the besiegers opened negotiations with representatives of the governor, Agustín M. Callejo, Juan José Sánchez and the priest Apolinario Zacarías. After long discussions with General Luis de Quintanar, they left for the capital for talks with the president. On 26 July there was a peace agreement, in which Santa Anna promised to preserve the federal system and designate Guadalupe Victoria as commanding general. Although the militants felt betrayed, the city was surrendered on 1 August. Cosme Furlong handed over the state government to General Victoria.

With rumors of the establishment of a centralized system, the governments of Zacatecas, Coahuila and Texas strengthened their militias. Aguascalientes was separated from Zacatecas in May 1835. The rumors were confirmed when Congress declared that the centralized system was constitutional and implemented it on 23 October 1835. This policy led to the Independence of Texas and, years later, the separation of Yucatán.
