= Higinio Paredes Ramos =

Mexican sailor and politician

Higino Paredes Ramos
- Born: San Esteban Tizatlán, Tlaxcala, Mexico
- Title: Senator in the Congress of the Union of Mexico
- Predecessor: Mauro Angulo
- Successor: Samuel Ortega Hernández
- Children: Beatriz Paredes Rangel

Higinio Paredes Ramos (San Esteban Tizatlán, Tlaxcala, 13 November 1896-Date and place unknown) was a Mexican sailor and politician, and a member of the Institutional Revolutionary Party (PRI). He was a senator for the state of Tlaxcala from 1952 to 1958.

== Biography ==
He completed his basic studies in the city of Tlaxcala de Xicohténcatl, where he was a farmer and rural teacher. He moved to Veracruz where he worked in the merchant marines and founded the Cooperative Society of Maritime Transport, of which he served as director. He was also an advisor to the National Bank for Cooperative Development. In 1952 he was elected Senator for the state of Tlaxcala on the first ticket, corresponding to the legislatures of XLII and XLIII that concluded in 1958. In the legislatures he was a member of the following commissions: Resources and National Assets, the Navy, and Public Works; he also chaired the 2nd commission of Ejido. In 1956 he received support to be the PRI's candidate for the governor of Tlaxcala in the elections of that year, however the candidate who was nominated was Joaquín Cisneros Molina.

At the end of his constitutional term, he retired from politics and returned to rural life. His wife was Bertha Rangel Solís and one of his daughters was Beatriz Paredes Rangel, who has had an extensive political career which resulted in her being the governor of Tlaxcala and the national president of the PRI.
