= Florentino Castro López =

Mexican politician

President of the Chamber of Deputies
- In office 15 March 1997 – 14 April 1997
- Preceded by: Sara Esther Muza Simón
- Succeeded by: Netzahualcóyotl de la Vega

Personal details
- Born: 20 June 1949 (age 77) Guasave, Sinaloa, Mexico
- Party: PRI
- Education: Autonomous University of Sinaloa
- Occupation: Politician

Florentino Castro López (born 20 June 1949) is a Mexican politician from the Institutional Revolutionary Party (PRI).

Castro López has served two terms in Congress: in 1994–1997, for the Federal District's 40th, and in 2000–2003, as a plurinominal deputy for the first region, which includes his home state of Sinaloa.

In 1991 to 1994 he served as the borough chief of Iztapalapa and in 2015 he was appointed the director of the Institute for Social Security and Services for State Workers (ISSSTE).
