= María Elena Álvarez Bernal =

Mexican politician (1930–2026)

President of the Chamber of Deputies
- In office 27 June 2007 – 30 August 2007
- Preceded by: Jorge Zermeño Infante
- Succeeded by: Ruth Zavaleta Salgado

Personal details
- Born: 5 October 1930 Zamora, Michoacán, Mexico
- Died: 12 February 2026 (aged 95)
- Party: PAN
- Spouse: Abel Vicencio Tovar
- Children: Felipe Vicencio Álvarez
- Occupation: Politician

María Elena Álvarez Bernal (Note: In this Hispanic American name, the first or paternal surname is Álvarez and the second or maternal family name is Bernal.) (5 October 1930 – 12 February 2026) was a Mexican politician from the National Action Party (PAN).

== Political career ==
Álvarez Bernal was a native of Zamora, Michoacán. She was elected to the Chamber of Deputies on four occasions:

- in the 1976 general election (50th Congress), as a party deputy
- in the 1994 general election (56th Congress), as a plurinominal deputy
- in the 2000 general election (58th Congress), as a plurinominal deputy
- in the 2006 general election (60th Congress), again to a plurinominal seat.

During her final term, she served as president of the Chamber in 2007. She was also elected to the Senate in 1997 (57th Congress), representing Michoacán.

== Personal life and death ==
Álvarez Bernal was married to Abel Vicencio Tovar, PAN president in 1978–1984 and four-term deputy. Their son was Felipe Vicencio Álvarez, who served as a senator for Jalisco in 2000–2006.

Álvarez Bernal died on 12 February 2026, at the age of 95.
