= Ruth Zavaleta =

Mexican politician

Ruth Zavaleta Salgado
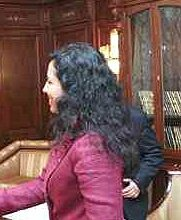

President of the Chamber of Deputies
- In office 1 September 2007 – 31 August 2008
- Preceded by: María Elena Álvarez Bernal
- Succeeded by: César Duarte Jáquez

4th Jefe Delegacional of Venustiano Carranza
- In office 2003–2005
- Preceded by: María Guadalupe Morales Rubio
- Succeeded by: Rocío Barrera Badillo

Personal details
- Born: 27 August 1966 (age 60) Mexico City
- Party: Ecologist Green Party of Mexico
- Education: National Autonomous University of Mexico
- Profession: Sociology

Ruth Zavaleta Salgado (born August 27, 1966) is a Mexican politician. She was affiliated with the Party of the Democratic Revolution (PRD) until November 2009 but changed and is currently part of the Ecologist Green Party of Mexico. She is a founding member of the PRD and the first female PRD politician to serve as President of the Chamber of Deputies 2007-2008.

== Personal life and education ==
Zavaleta holds a bachelor's degree in sociology from the National Autonomous University of Mexico (UNAM).

== Political career ==
In 1989 Zavaleta was one of the founders of the PRD. In 1997 Cuauhtemoc Cárdenas designated her as Secretary of Social Development in the government of the Mexican Federal District; she then served (1998–2000) as Secretary of Finance in the Mexican Federal District.

From 2000 to 2003 she served in the Legislative Assembly of the Mexican Federal District. In 2003 she was elected borough mayor (Jefe Delegacional) of Venustiano Carranza.

In 2006 Zavaleta won a seat in the Chamber of Deputies of Mexico; hence she was serving during the LX Legislature of the Mexican Congress. In 2007 she was elected President of the Chamber of Deputies Directive Board for the second year of the LX Legislature (September 2007–August 2008).

Political offices
Preceded by María Elena Álvarez Bernal	President of the Chamber of Deputies of Mexico; 2007–2008	Succeeded by César Duarte Jáquez
Preceded by María Guadalupe Morales Rubio	Jefe Delegacional of Venustiano Carranza; 2003–2005	Succeeded by Rocío Barrera Badillo
