= Zamacona =

Zamacona is a Basque surname. Notable people with the surname include:

- Jorge Zamacona (born 1959), American screenwriter and producer
- Manuel María de Zamacona y Murphy (1826 – 1904), Mexican radical liberal lawyer, journalist, and politician
