= Juan Cayetano Gómez de Portugal y Solís =

Mexican politician

Juan Cayetano José María Gómez de Portugal y Solís
- Bishop
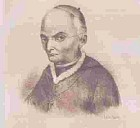
- Diocese: Michoacán, México
- Appointed: 28 February 1831
- Installed: 21 August 1831
- Term ended: 4 April 1850
- Predecessor: Manuel Abad y Queipo
- Successor: Clemente de Jesús Munguía

Orders
- Ordination: 21 August 1831

Personal details
- Born: July 7, 1783 Ciudad Manuel Doblado, Guanajuato, Mexico
- Died: April 4, 1850 (aged 66) Morelia, Michoacán
- Denomination: Roman Catholic
- Education: Seminary of Guadalajara

Juan Cayetano José María Gómez de Portugal y Solís (7 July 1783 - 4 April 1850) was a university professor and the Bishop of Michoacán. He played an active role in the politics of Mexico.

== Biography ==
Juan Cayetano Gómez de Portugal y Solís was born in San Pedro Piedra Gorda, today Manuel Doblado, Guanajuato, on 7 July 1783. He studied at the Seminary of Guadalajara. He was ordained priest and became a professor at his alma mater. He became noted as a writer, and was a member of several literary societies. He earned a doctorate in theology.

In 1815, during the Mexican War of Independence, he was appointed priest of Zapopan, Jalisco. Once Mexico had achieved independence, he was a member of the provincial government of Jalisco and adviser to the governor. In 1824, he participated in the signing of the Constitutional Act of the Mexican Federation. He represented his home state three times and was senator from the state of Jalisco. He was President of the Chamber of Deputies on two occasions (1825 and 1828), and was among a group of deputies who advocated federalism.

On February 28, 1831, he was appointed bishop of Michoacán, and was consecrated on 21 August 1831. After taking his miter, he toured his diocese for two years. He proposed to the Holy See and the government that it should be divided. On 17 December 1833, Congress issued a decree that authorized the government to fill parish vacancies. Bishops and governors of bishoprics who did not comply with this decree would be fined on the first two occasions, and banished from the country after a third offense. Gómez was among the bishops who refused to obey the law.

On 25 May 1834 the Plan of Cuernavaca was published, demanding repeal of this and other unpopular reforms. On 12 June 1834, President Antonio López de Santa Anna gave his support to the Plan of Cuernavaca. On 14 June, the new council of the capital supported the president's decision. The same day, Bishop Juan Cayetano Gomez de Portugal led Mass at the Metropolitan Cathedral in Mexico City and sang the Te Deum. On 24 June in Mexico City, Santa Anna abolished the law of Ecclesiastical Trusts issued of 17 December 1833. At the same time he appointed Gómez de Portugal y Solís] to the post of Secretary of Justice and Ecclesiastical Affairs in place of Andrés Quintana Roo.

After serving for a period, Gómez resigned from this position. He issued a pastoral letter in which he defended the independence of the Catholic Church. In 1845, he returned to his diocese. He founded the seminary in León, the Institute of the Sisters of Charity in Silao, and Coyuca Seminar in Pátzcuaro. He died on 4 April 1850 in Morelia, Michoacán. Shortly after his death, a letter arrived from Cardinal Giacomo Antonelli which announced that Pope Pius IX had decided to elevate him to the dignity of Cardinal.
