= Netzahualcóyotl de la Vega =

Mexican trade union leader and politician

Netzahualcóyotl de la Vega García

President of the Chamber of Deputies
- In office 15 April 1997 – 31 August 1997
- Preceded by: Florentino Castro López
- Succeeded by: Porfirio Muñoz Ledo
- In office 1 September 1984 – 30 September 1984
- Preceded by: Luz Lajous Vargas
- Succeeded by: Ricardo Castillo Peralta

Personal details
- Born: 18 January 1931 Placeres del Oro, Guerrero, Mexico
- Died: 6 September 2004 (aged 73) Mexico City, Mexico
- Party: PRI
- Education: UNAM
- Occupation: Trade unionist and politician

Netzahualcóyotl de la Vega García (18 January 1931 – 6 September 2004) was a Mexican trade union leader and politician affiliated with the Institutional Revolutionary Party (PRI).

He served in the Senate during the 54th and 55th sessions of Congress (1988–1994) representing Guerrero, and he was re-elected to the Senate for the 58th and 59th sessions (2000–2006) as a plurinominal senator.

He also served twice in the Chamber of Deputies: during the 52nd Congress (1982–1985), for the Federal District's 34th district, and during the 56th Congress (1994–1997), for Guerrero's third district. He was the President of the Chamber of Deputies in 1984 and 1997.

He died in office during his second Senate term.
