= Laura Rojas Hernández =

Mexican politician

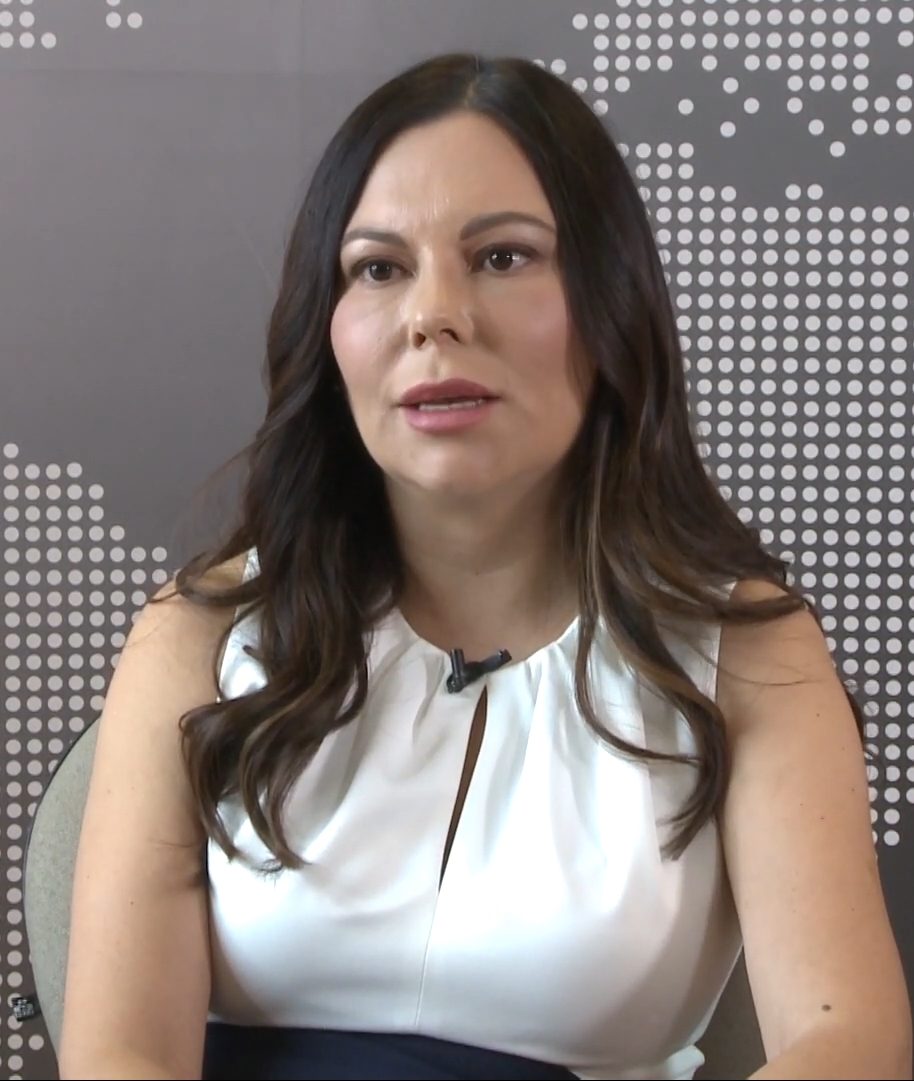

President of the Chamber of Deputies
- In office 5 September 2019 – 2 September 2020
- Preceded by: Porfirio Muñoz Ledo
- Succeeded by: Dulce María Sauri Riancho

Personal details
- Born: Laura Angélica Rojas Hernández; 26 December 1975 (age 49); Mexico City, Mexico
- Political party: National Action Party
- Occupation: President of Chamber of Deputies

Laura Angélica Rojas Hernández (born 26 December 1975) is a Mexican politician affiliated with the National Action Party (PAN).

She served as congresswoman of the LXIV Legislature of the Mexican Congress, she was also the President of the Chamber of Deputies (equivalent to the Speaker of the House in other countries). She also served as congresswoman during the LX Legislature and as a Senator from 2012 to 2018. During her tenure as Senator, she was the Chairwoman of the Foreign Affairs Committee.

Laura Rojas was elected President of the Chamber of Deputies on September 5, 2019. This was the fourth vote over a period of three days, with 349 votes in favor, 42 against, and 37 absent.
