= Manuel Saavedra =

Chilean footballer (1941–2011)

Personal information
- Full name: Manuel Saavedra Ibarra
- Date of birth: 24 April 1941
- Place of birth: Los Andes, Chile
- Date of death: 26 August 2011 (aged 70)
- Position: Forward

International career
Years	Team	Apps	(Gls)
1967	Chile	2	(1)

Manuel Saavedra (24 April 1941 – 26 August 2011) was a Chilean footballer. He played in two matches for the Chile national football team in 1967. He was also part of Chile's squad for the 1967 South American Championship.
