= Francisco Manuel Sánchez de Tagle =

Mexican politician

Francisco Sánchez de Tagle
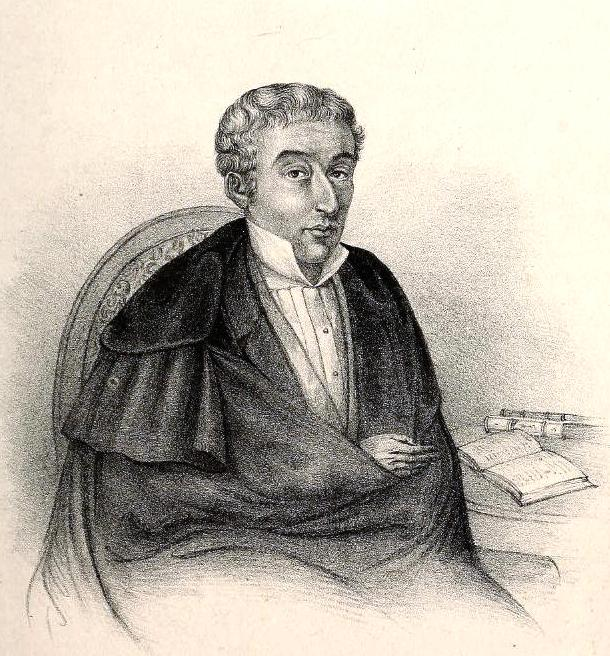
- Born: January 11, 1782; Valladolid, Michoacán, Viceroyalty of New Spain
- Died: December 7, 1847 (aged 65); Mexico City
- Education: Colegio de San Juan de Letran
- Occupations: Writer, Statesman

Francisco Manuel Sánchez de Tagle (1782-1847) was a Mexican poet, writer, and conservative statesman.

== Early life and education ==
He was born in Valladolid on January 11, 1782, to Manuel Sanchez de Tagle and Gertrudis Varela. When he was five years old, his family moved to Mexico City to provide a better education to their children, where Sánchez de Tagle was enrolled in a religious primary school run by the Bethlehem Fathers. Here he impressed his teachers with his talents in arithmetic and the young Tagle was allowed to pursue more advanced studies in that field.

In August, 1794, at the age of 12 Sánchez de Tagle entered the College of San Juan de Letran whose rector was Dr. Marrugot. There, Tagle learned Latin and studied philosophy, theology, and jurisprudence, excelling in all fields. He studied Homer, Virgil, Descartes, and Leibniz and gained knowledge in mathematics, astronomy, physics, history, geography, and chronology. Dr. Marrugat even asked Sánchez de Tagle if he could keep his annotated version of Virgil in the school library. Sánchez de Tagle was named by the Spanish king as a member of the Academy of San Carlos, and later a councilor of the same society. In October, 1803, at the age of 19, he was named professor of philosophy at his school by viceroy José de Iturrigaray, and Iturrigaray invited Sánchez de Tagle to the National Palace simply to meet him. During his professorship, he would also lecture on mathematics and physics.

== Political career ==
In 1808, he was made regidor and secretary of the Ayuntamient of Mexico City, and passed regulations regarding the municipal archives. After Mexico gained representation in the Spanish Cortes under the Constitution of Cádiz, Sánchez de Tagle was elected a deputy to the Cortes in 1814. He was nonetheless a supporter of Mexican independence and wrote odes to the heroes of the insurgency. He was the individual who drafted the act of Mexican independence and was also among its signers.

With the triumph of the Plan of Iguala, independent Mexico was set up to be a monarchy. Sánchez de Tagle was a Bourbonist, who wished a member of the Spanish royal family to assume the Mexican throne, but it ultimately went to Agustín de Iturbide, and Tagle remained such a staunch opponent of Iturbide that he was one of the congressional deputies arrested by the emperor in 1822.

After the fall of the First Mexican Empire, Sánchez de Tagle was governor of the State of Mexico, and he was favored to assume the governorship of Michoacán by that state's legislature. From 1824 to 1826 he was a deputy in the lower chamber, and a senator. In 1830, he was made accountant general.

As the First Mexican Republic gave way to the Centralist Republic of Mexico, Sánchez de Tagle helped draft the Siete Leyes, giving a discourse to congress on establishing a fourth branch of government, which would eventually become the Supreme Moderating Power, a council that was constitutionally above even the president, and which Tagle would be chosen to be a member of.

In 1846, he was a contributor to El Tiempo, Lucas Alamán's paper advocating the establishment of a monarchy in Mexico.

== Writing and intellectual career ==
He also engaged in philanthropy, belonging to the junta of the charitable institution, the Hospicio de Pobres, and was president of the Lancasterian Company, whose purpose was to promote education in Mexico. He was a member of the Academy of Legislation and Political Economy, censor of drama, and vice president of the Academy of History. He was a devout Catholic who also advised theologians in Mexico City on difficult cases, and in 1831, the Vatican sent him a dispensation granting him permission to read all forbidden works.

He was a prolific poet with a knowledge in ancient Greek, ancient Roman, Spanish, French, and English poetry. After his death, one of his sons published a complete collection of Tagle's poetic works. He wrote poetry in various genre's and among his most notable works were Oda a la luna en tiempo de discordias civiles (Ode to the moon in times of civil discord), and the ode that was sung at the entry of the Trigarantine Army to Mexico City in 1821.

== Final years ==
In 1836, he was named director of the Nacional Monte de Piedad, the national pawnshop, and he held his post during the Mexican–American War. He was mortally wounded during a robbery and died on December 7, 1847. He is the great-great-great-grandfather of mexican actor Eugenio Derbez.
