= Víctor Manzanilla Schaffer =

Mexican politician and diplomat (1924–2019)

Governor of Yucatán
- In office 1 February 1988 – 14 February 1991
- Preceded by: Víctor Cervera Pacheco
- Succeeded by: Dulce María Sauri Riancho

President of the Chamber of Deputies
- In office 1 November 1977 – 30 November 1977
- Preceded by: Martha Andrade de Del Rosal
- Succeeded by: Guillermo Cosío Vidaurri
- In office 1 September 1967 – 30 September 1967
- Preceded by: Alejandro Carrillo Marcor
- Succeeded by: Edgar Robledo Santiago

Member of the Chamber of Deputies for Yucatán′s 3rd district
- In office 1 September 1976 – 31 August 1979
- Preceded by: Efraín Ceballos Gutiérrez
- Succeeded by: Jorge Jure Cejín
- In office 1 September 1967 – 31 August 1970
- Preceded by: Francisco Luna Kan
- Succeeded by: Jorge Carlos González

Personal details
- Born: 13 November 1924 Mexico City, Mexico
- Died: 7 April 2019 (aged 94) Irapuato, Guanajuato, Mexico
- Party: Institutional Revolutionary Party
- Spouse: Roby Naim
- Children: 6, including Linda Manzanilla Naim

Víctor Manzanilla Schaffer (13 November 1924 – 7 April 2019) was a Mexican politician and diplomat who served as governor of the state of Yucatán. He was a member of the Institutional Revolutionary Party (PRI).

== Early life and education ==
Manzanilla Schaffer was born on 13 November 1924 in Mexico City. His was the son of Rosa Schaffer Acevedo and Víctor Manzanilla Jiménez, the latter of whom was a revolutionary politician in Yucatán, the founder of the Anti-Reelection Party and a congressman. Manzanilla Jiménez was originally from Cansahcab, Yucatán, while Schaffer Acevedo was from Progreso, Yucatán. Manzanilla Schaffer's paternal grandparents were Filomena Jiménez and Guillermo Manzanilla, who was a public notary official. His maternal great-grandfather was Enrique V. Schaffer, a German-born jeweler.

Manzanilla Schaffer earned an undergraduate degree from the School of Law of the National Autonomous University of Mexico (UNAM), a master's degree in sociology from The New School for Social Research in New York, and a doctorate in law.

== Career ==
He served as a legal assistant in the United Nations division of narcotics, as Mexico's ambassador to China and its first to North Korea, and for two terms as a member of the Senate and two as a member of the Chamber of Deputies for Yucatán's second district. He exerted unusual independence as a congressman, on one occasion voting against President José López Portillo's amendment of Article 27 of the Constitution.

He won the 1987 Yucatán gubernatorial election in a landslide with 85.4% of the vote, or 280,130 votes in total. He succeeded Víctor Cervera Pacheco. He served as the governor of Yucatán from 1 February 1988 to 14 February 1991. Manzanilla Schaffer in 1989 began to consider privatizing Cordemex, the state rope company. He cited unproductivity as the reason, and began the privatization and restructuring the state's henequen industry in 1990, which was completed the following year in his successor's term. He also created the Directorate of Ecology of the Ministry of Urban Development, Public Works, Ecology and Housing of the Government of the State of Yucatán (Spanish: Dirección de Ecología de la Secretaría de Desarrollo Urbano, Obras Públicas, Ecología y Vivienda del Gobierno del Estado de Yucatán).

The term he was elected to was to last until 1994, but in 1991 he resigned three years before his term was to have ended, it is presumed at the urging of Cervera Pacheco and of President Carlos Salinas de Gortari. Manzanilla Schaffer was succeeded on an interim basis by Dulce María Sauri Riancho, the state's first female governor.

== Personal life ==
In 1948, Manzanilla Schaffer was sent by the government to the Headquarters of the United Nations in New York City to legislate on drugs. There, he met the Egyptian Roby Naim, whose parents were Arabic-speakers from Egypt and Tunisia of French origin. They married, and had six children. One daughter, Linda Manzanilla Naim, became an archeologist. Manzanilla Schaffer died on 7 April 2019, at the age of 94, in Irapuato, Guanajuato.

== Honours ==
Among other honours Manzanilla Schaffer was awarded the Medalla al Mérito Legislativo, the Knight Commander's Cross of the Grand Cross of Merit of the Order of Merit of the Federal Republic of Germany, and the Jesús Reyes Heroles prize of the Agrupación Nacional de Egresados del Instituto de Capacitación Política of the PRI.
