= 1967 Mexican legislative election =

Legislative elections were held in Mexico on 2 July 1967. The Institutional Revolutionary Party won 177 of the 212 seats in the Chamber of Deputies.

== Results ==
Party	Votes	%	Seats	+/–
Institutional Revolutionary Party	8,342,114	83.93	177	+2
National Action Party	1,223,926	12.31	20	0
Popular Socialist Party	215,087	2.16	10	0
Authentic Party of the Mexican Revolution	138,799	1.40	5	0
Non-registered candidates	18,888	0.19	0	0
Total	9,938,814	100.00	212	+2
Registered voters/turnout	15,821,075	–		
Source: Nohlen
