= Horacio Duarte Olivares =

Mexican politician

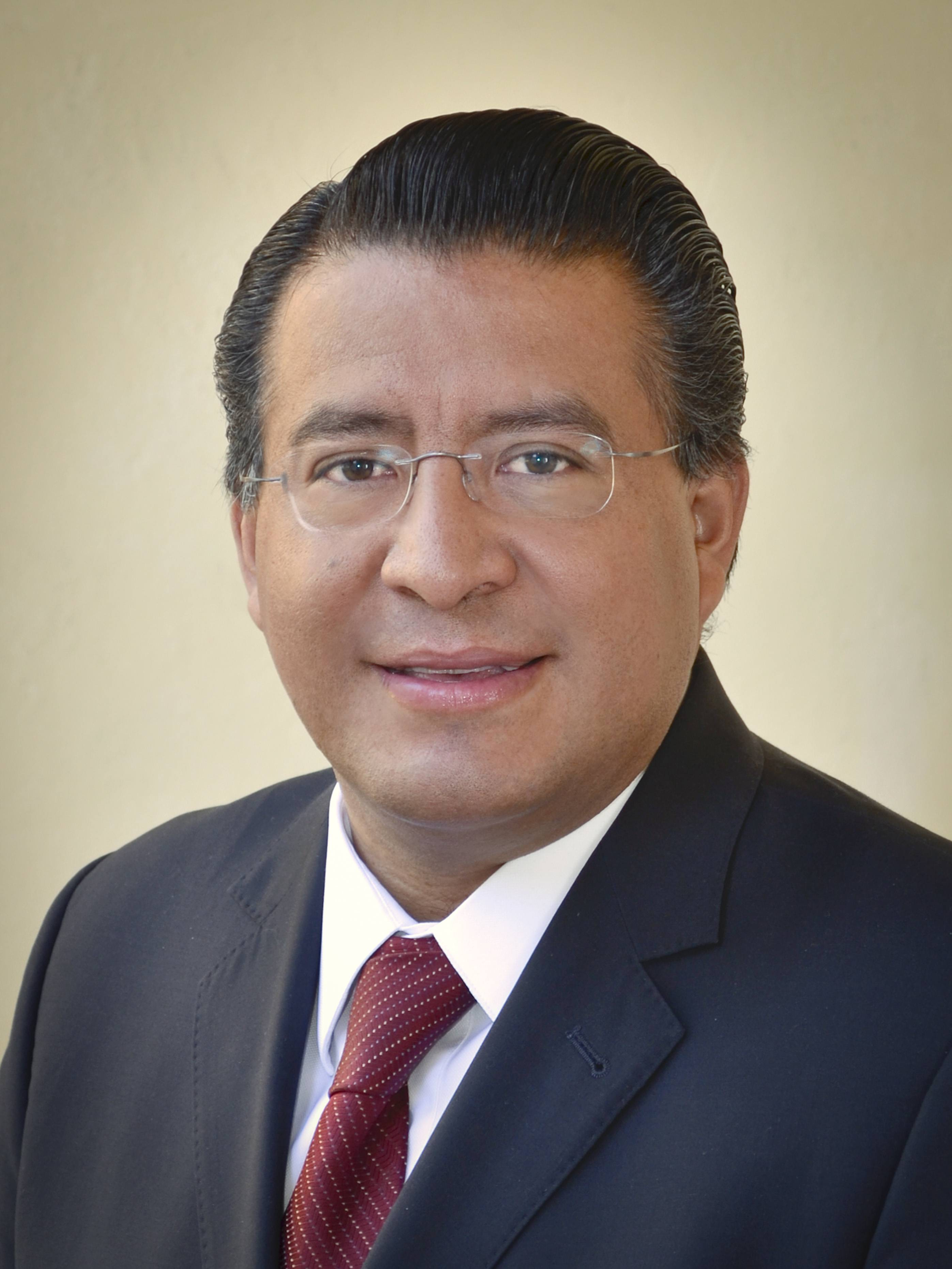
- Born: 5 November 1971 (age 54); Texcoco, State of Mexico, Mexico
- Education: UNAM
- Occupation: Politician
- Political party: PRD (1987–2011); MRN (2011–present)

Horacio Duarte Olivares (born 5 November 1971) is a Mexican politician affiliated with the National Regeneration Movement (formerly to the Party of the Democratic Revolution). He served as Deputy of the LIX Legislature of the Mexican Congress as a plurinominal representative, and previously served in the Congress of the State of Mexico.
