= Juan Cruz Martínez =

Mexican politician (1952–2026)

Member of the Chamber of Deputies of Mexico
- In office 1 September 1997 – 31 August 2000

Personal details
- Born: 1 September 1952 Monclova, Coahuila, Mexico
- Died: 13 April 2026 (aged 73)
- Party: PT, PRD, MORENA
- Education: Chapingo Autonomous University
- Occupation: Agronomic engineer

Juan José Cruz Martínez (Note: In this Mexican name, the surname is Cruz and the second or maternal family name is Martínez.) (1 September 1952 – 13 April 2026) was a Mexican politician. During his political career, he belonged to the Labour Party (PT), the Party of the Democratic Revolution (PRD) and, finally, the National Regeneration Movement (MORENA).

== Life and career ==
Cruz Martínez was an agricultural engineer with a degree from Chapingo Autonomous University.

In the 1997 mid-term election, he was elected to a plurinominal seat in the Chamber of Deputies for the PT, where he served from 1997 to 2000 during the 57th Congress.

Cruz Martínez died on 13 April 2026, at the age of 73. Marcos Carlos Cruz Martínez was his brother.
