= José María Lozano =

Mexican lawyer and politician

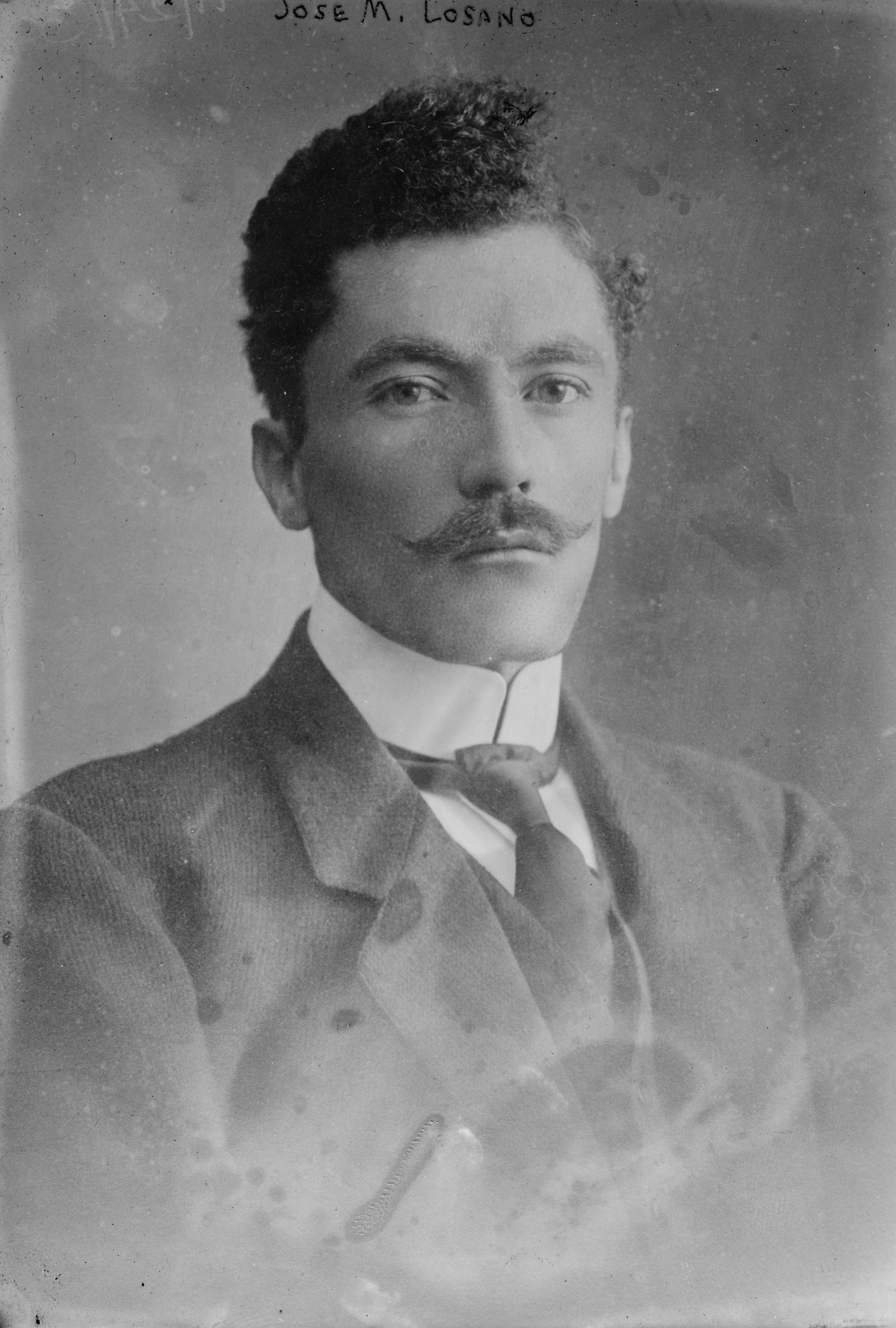
- José María Lozano in 1913

Secretary of Commerce and Public Works
- In office 15 September 1913 – 14 October 1913
- President: Victoriano Huerta

Secretary of Public Instruction and Fine Arts
- In office 11 August 1913 – 15 September 1913
- President: Victoriano Huerta

Personal details
- Born: 29 October 1878 San Miguel el Alto, Jalisco
- Died: 17 August 1933 (aged 54) Mexico City
- Parent(s): Andres Lozano and Elodia Rabago
- Education: National School of Jurisprudence

José María Lozano (29 October 1878 – 17 August 1933) was a Mexican lawyer and conservative politician who briefly served as Secretary of Public Instruction and Fine Arts and Secretary of Commerce and Public Works in the cabinet of Victoriano Huerta, the army general who assumed control of the country following a coup d'état against the democratically elected president, Francisco I. Madero.

Before assuming his post in the cabinet, Lozano served as federal congressman in the Chamber of Deputies, where he led a group of conservative Anti-Maderistas along fellow deputies Nemesio García Naranjo of Nuevo León, Francisco de Olaguíbel of State of Mexico, and Querido Moheno of Chiapas. At Huerta's request, he also tried to build a legislative majority sympathetic to his regime.

== Books ==
- José María Lozano en la tribuna parlamentaria, 1910–1913 (1956)
- Discursos y conferencias, 1919–1932 (1960)

== See also ==
- 1913 Coup d'état in Mexico
