= Joaquín Gamboa Pascoe =

Mexican trade union leader and politician

Senator of the Congress of the Union for the Federal District
- In office 1 September 1976 – 31 August 1982
- Preceded by: Alfonso Sánchez Madariaga
- Succeeded by: Abraham Martínez Rivero

Member of the Chamber of Deputies for the Federal District′s 13th district
- In office 1 September 1967 – 31 August 1970
- Preceded by: Hilda Anderson Nevárez
- Succeeded by: Leopoldo Cerón Sánchez

Personal details
- Born: 30 May 1922 Mexico City, D.F., Mexico
- Died: 7 January 2016 (aged 93) Mexico City, D.F., Mexico
- Party: PRI
- Occupation: Trade union leader and politician

Joaquín Gamboa Pascoe (May 30, 1922 – January 7, 2016) was a Mexican trade union leader and politician.

== Biography ==
He had a degree in law from the National Autonomous University of Mexico. Gamboa Pascoe was the general secretary of the Federal District Federation of Workers (in Spanish: Federación de Trabajadores del Distrito Federal, FTDF) and from August 9, 2005, until his death, he was the general secretary of the Confederation of Mexican Workers (CTM), the largest confederation of labor unions in the country.

Gamboa Pascoe was elected to the Senate in 1976, representing the Federal District for the Institutional Revolutionary Party. He ran for reelection in 1988 but lost his bid against Porfirio Muñoz Ledo of the left-wing National Democratic Front (FDN). He also served in the Chamber of Deputies: from 1961 to 1964, representing the Federal District's 18th district, and from 1967 to 1970, representing the Federal District's 13th district.

Gamboa Pascoe died on January 7, 2016, aged 93.

Preceded by Leonardo Rodríguez Alcaine	General Secretary of the Confederation of Mexican Workers; 2005–2016	Incumbent
