= 1980 in Mexico =

- Decades: 1960s; 1970s; 1980s; 1990s; 2000s
- See also: History of Mexico; List of years in Mexico; Timeline of Mexican history

Events in the year 1980 in Mexico.

== Incumbents ==
=== Federal government ===
- President: José López Portillo
- Interior Secretary (SEGOB): Enrique Olivares Santana (until November 30), Manuel Bartlett Díaz (starting December 1)
- Secretary of Foreign Affairs (SRE): Jorge Castañeda y Álvarez
- Communications Secretary (SCT): Emilio Mújica Montoya
- Secretary of Defense (SEDENA): Félix Galván López
- Secretary of Navy: Ricardo Cházaro Lara
- Secretary of Labor and Social Welfare: Pedro Ojeda Paullada
- Secretary of Welfare: Pedro Ramírez Vázquez
- Secretary of Public Education: Fernando Solana Morales
- Tourism Secretary (SECTUR): Guillermo Rossell de la Lama/Rosa Luz Alegría Escamilla

=== Supreme Court ===
- President of the Supreme Court: Agustín Téllez Cruces

=== Governors ===
- Aguascalientes: José Refugio Esparza Reyes/Rodolfo Landeros Gallegos (PRI)
- Baja California: Roberto de la Madrid (PRI)
- Baja California Sur: Angel César Mendoza Arámburo (PRI)
- Campeche: José Refugio Esparza Reyes/Rodolfo Landeros Gallegos (PRI)
- Chiapas: Eugenio Echeverría Castellot (PRI)
- Chihuahua: Manuel Bernardo Aguirre/Óscar Ornelas (PRI)
- Coahuila: Oscar Flores Tapia/Francisco José Madero González (PRI)
- Colima: Griselda Álvarez (PRI)
- Durango: Salvador Gámiz Fernández/Armando del Castillo Franco (PRI)
- Guanajuato: Enrique Velasco Ibarra (PRI)
- Guerrero: Rubén Figueroa Figueroa (PRI)
- Hidalgo: Jorge Rojo Lugo (PRI)
- Jalisco: Flavio Romero de Velasco (PRI)
- State of Mexico: Jorge Jiménez Cantú
- Michoacán: Carlos Torres Manzo/Cuauhtemoc Cardenas
- Morelos: Armando León Bejarano (PRI)
- Nayarit: Rogelio Flores Curiel (PRI)
- Nuevo León: Flavio Romero de Velasco
- Oaxaca: Eliseo Jimenez Ruiz/Pedro Vasquez Colmenares (PRI)
- Puebla: Toxqui Fernández de Lara (PRI)
- Querétaro: Rafael Camacho Guzmán (PRI)
- Quintana Roo: Fernando Pámanes Escobedo/José Guadalupe Cervantes Corona (PRI)
- San Luis Potosí: Carlos Jonguitud Barrios (PRI)
- Sinaloa: Alfonso G. Calderón (PRI)
- Sonora: Samuel Ocaña García (PRI)
- Tabasco: Leandro Rovirosa Wade (PRI)
- Tamaulipas: Enrique Cárdenas González (PRI)
- Tlaxcala: Emilio Sánchez Piedras (PRI)
- Veracruz: Rafael Hernández Ochoa (PRI)
- Yucatán: Francisco Luna Kan (PRI)
- Zacatecas: Fernando Pámanes Escobedo/José Guadalupe Cervantes Corona (PRI)
- Regent of Mexico City: Carlos Hank González

== Events ==
- Zeta is founded.
- The Centro de Investigación en Matemáticas is established.
- The Centro de Investigaciones en Optica is founded.
- The Ollin Yoliztli Prize is awarded for the first time.
- The Palacio de Lecumberri starts housing the General National Archive
- July 31–August 11: Hurricane Allen.
- October 24: 1980 Oaxaca earthquake.

== Awards ==
- Belisario Domínguez Medal of Honor – Luis Padilla Nervo

== Film ==
- List of Mexican films of 1980.

== Sport ==
- 1979–80 Mexican Primera División season.
- Saraperos de Saltillo win the Mexican League.
- Mexico at the 1980 Summer Olympics.
- Mexico at the 1980 Summer Paralympics.
- Correcaminos UAT founded.

== Births ==
- February 4 – Gerardo Alcántara, soccer player
- February 23 – Geovanna Bañuelos de la Torre, politician
- March 18 — Olga Vargas, synchronized swimmer
- March 30 — Mauricio Vila Dosal, Governor of Yucatán 2018–2024
- April 2 – Carlos Salcido, footballer
- September 1 – Raúl Osiel Marroquín, serial killer
- November 15 — Diego Sinhué Rodríguez Vallejo, Governor of Guanajuato starting 2018
- December 12 — Pablo Baltodano Monroy, diplomat and politician

== Deaths ==
- March 18 — Erich Fromm, German-American psychologist and philosopher who lived in Cuernavaca from 1956-1976 (b. 1900)
- May 13 — Carmen García González, wife of President Emilio Portes Gil (1928-1930) (b. 1905)
