= 1979 in Mexico =

- Decades: 1950s; 1960s; 1970s; 1980s; 1990s
- See also: History of Mexico; List of years in Mexico; Timeline of Mexican history

Events in the year 1979 in Mexico.

== Incumbents ==
=== Federal government ===
- President: José López Portillo
- Interior Secretary (SEGOB): Jesús Reyes Heroles/Enrique Olivares Santana
- Secretary of Foreign Affairs (SRE): Santiago Roel García/Jorge Castañeda y Álvarez
- Communications Secretary (SCT): Emilio Mújica Montoya
- Secretary of Defense (SEDENA): Félix Galván López
- Secretary of Navy: Ricardo Cházaro Lara
- Secretary of Labor and Social Welfare: Pedro Ojeda Paullada
- Secretary of Welfare: Pedro Ramírez Vázquez
- Secretary of Public Education: Fernando Solana Morales
- Tourism Secretary (SECTUR): Guillermo Rossell de la Lama

=== Supreme Court ===
- President of the Supreme Court: Agustín Téllez Cruces

=== Governors ===
- Aguascalientes: José Refugio Esparza Reyes
- Baja California: Roberto de la Madrid
- Baja California Sur: Angel César Mendoza Arámburo
- Campeche: Rafael Rodríguez Barrera/Eugenio Echeverría Castellot
- Chiapas: Salomón González Blanco
- Chihuahua: Manuel Bernardo Aguirre
- Coahuila: Oscar Flores Tapia
- Colima: Salvador Gámiz Fernández/Griselda Álvarez
- Durango: Héctor Mayagoitia Domínguez/Salvador Gámiz Fernández
- Guanajuato: Enrique Velasco Ibarra/Luis H. Ducoing Gamba
- Guerrero: Flavio Romero de Velasco
- Hidalgo: Rubén Figueroa Figueroa
- Jalisco: Flavio Romero de Velasco
- State of Mexico: Jorge Jiménez Cantú
- Michoacán: Carlos Torres Manzo
- Morelos: Armando León Bejarano (PRI)
- Nayarit: Rogelio Flores Curiel
- Nuevo León: Pedro Zorrilla Martínez
- Oaxaca: Eliseo Jiménez Ruiz
- Puebla: Toxqui Fernández de Lara
- Querétaro: Rafael Camacho Guzmán
- Quintana Roo: Jesús Martínez Ross
- San Luis Potosí: Carlos Jonguitud Barrios
- Sinaloa: Alfonso G. Calderón
- Sonora: Alejandro Carrillo Marcor
- Tabasco: Leandro Rovirosa Wade
- Tamaulipas: Enrique Cárdenas González
- Tlaxcala: Emilio Sánchez Piedras
- Veracruz: Rafael Hernández Ochoa
- Yucatán: Francisco Luna Kan
- Zacatecas: Fernando Pámanes Escobedo
- Regent of Mexico City: Carlos Hank González

== Events ==
- Museo Rufino Tamayo in Oaxaca opens.
- Colegio Alemán de Guadalajara founded.
- University of the Cloister of Sor Juana established.
- February 5: Roman Catholic Diocese of Cuautitlán established.
- June 3: Ixtoc I oil spill
- July 1: 1979 Mexican legislative election
- September 14–21: Hurricane Henri (1979)
- October 31: Western Airlines Flight 2605

== Awards ==
- Belisario Domínguez Medal of Honor – Fidel Velázquez Sánchez

== Film ==
- List of Mexican films of 1979

== Sport ==
- 1978–79 Mexican Primera División season.
- Ángeles de Puebla win the Mexican League.
- 1979 Summer Universiade in Mexico City.
- 1979 Central American and Caribbean Championships in Athletics in Guadalajara.
- Club de Fútbol Oaxtepec founded.

== Births ==
- January 28: Melvin Brown, footballer
- February 1 - Valentín Elizalde (d. 2006)
- February 13: Rafael Márquez, footballer and manager
- February 19: Mariana Ochoa, singer and actress
- February 26 - Susana Diazayas, actress
- February 28: Amat Escalante, film director, producer and screenwriter
- March 1: Fernando Montiel, boxer
- March 16: Adriana Fonseca, actress and dancer.
- March 16: Daniel Osorno, footballer
- April 30: Gerardo Torrado, footballer
- May 15: Adolfo Bautista, footballer
- June 1: Mario Méndez, Mexican footballer
- July 21: Luis Ernesto Michel, footballer
- July 23: Perro Aguayo Jr., pro wrestler (d. March 21, 2015).
- July 27: Jorge Arce, boxer
- August 7: Juan Pablo Rodríguez, footballer
- August 28: Michel Franco, film director
- September 25: Karla Luna, actress (Las Lavanderas) and singer (d. September 28, 2017).
- September 29: Jaime Lozano, footballer and Current manager of the Mexican National Association Football team
- October 2: Francisco Fonseca, footballer and analyst
- October 14: Guillermo Pérez, taekwondo practitioner
- October 23: Jorge Solís, boxer
- November 14 Miguel Sabah, footballer
- November 19: Michelle Vieth, American born Mexican actress and model.
- December 23: Jacqueline Bracamontes, Mexican actress and beauty contest winner (Nuestra Belleza México 2000).
- December 29: Diego Luna, actor, director, producer

== Deaths ==
- January 18 — María Dolores Izaguirre de Ruiz, First Lady of Mexico (1952-1958) (b. 1891)
- July 15 — Gustavo Díaz Ordaz Bolaños, President of Mexico 1964-1970 (b. 1911)
