= 1977 in Mexico =

- Decades: 1950s; 1960s; 1970s; 1980s; 1990s
- See also: History of Mexico; List of years in Mexico; Timeline of Mexican history

Events in the year 1977 in Mexico.

== Incumbents ==
=== Federal government ===
- President: José López Portillo
- Interior Secretary (SEGOB): Jesús Reyes Heroles
- Secretary of Foreign Affairs (SRE): Santiago Roel García
- Communications Secretary (SCT): Emilio Mújica Montoya
- Education Secretary (SEP): Porfirio Muñoz Ledo/Fernando Solana Morales
- Secretary of Defense (SEDENA): Félix Galván López
- Secretary of Navy: Ricardo Cházaro Lara
- Secretary of Labor and Social Welfare: Pedro Ojeda Paullada
- Secretary of Welfare: Pedro Ramírez Vázquez
- Secretary of Public Education: Porfirio Muñoz Ledo/Fernando Solana Morales
- Tourism Secretary (SECTUR): Guillermo Rossell de la Lama

=== Supreme Court ===
- President of the Supreme Court: Mario G. Rebolledo Fernández

=== Governors ===
- Aguascalientes: José Refugio Esparza Reyes
- Baja California
  - Milton Castellanos Everardo, until October 31
  - Roberto de la Madrid, starting November 1
- Baja California Sur: José Refugio Esparza Reyes
- Campeche: Rafael Rodríguez Barrera
- Chiapas: Jorge de la Vega Domínguez/Salomón González Blanco
- Chihuahua: Manuel Bernardo Aguirre
- Coahuila: Oscar Flores Tapia
- Colima: Arturo Noriega Pizano
- Durango: Héctor Mayagoitia Domínguez
- Guanajuato: Luis H. Ducoing Gamba
- Guerrero: Rubén Figueroa Figueroa
- Hidalgo: José Luis Suárez Molina
- Jalisco: Alberto Orozco Romero/Flavio Romero de Velasco
- State of Mexico: Jorge Jiménez Cantú
- Michoacán: Carlos Torres Manzo
- Morelos: Armando León Bejarano (PRI)
- Nayarit: Rogelio Flores Curiel
- Nuevo León: Pedro Zorrilla Martínez
- Oaxaca: Miguel Zárate Aquino/Eliseo Jiménez Ruiz
- Puebla: Toxqui Fernández de Lara
- Querétaro: Antonio Calzada Urquiza
- Quintana Roo: Jesús Martínez Ross
- San Luis Potosí: Guillermo Fonseca Álvarez
- Sinaloa: Alfonso G. Calderón
- Sonora: Alejandro Carrillo Marcor
- Tabasco: Leandro Rovirosa Wade
- Tamaulipas: Enrique Cárdenas González
- Tlaxcala: Emilio Sánchez Piedras
- Veracruz: Rafael Hernández Ochoa
- Yucatán: Francisco Luna Kan
- Zacatecas: Fernando Pámanes Escobedo
- Regent of Mexico City: Carlos Hank González

== Events ==
- The now-ubiquitous convenience store chain OXXO is founded.
- The Monterrey College of Music and Dance is established.
- April 13: Roman Catholic Diocese of Nuevo Casas Grandes established.
- August 29 – September 4:Hurricane Anita
- September: Liceo Mexicano Japonés opens its doors in Mexico City.

== Awards ==
- Belisario Domínguez Medal of Honor – Juan de Dios Bátiz Peredes

== Births ==
- January 4 – Irán Castillo, Mexican actress and singer
- February 28 — Rafael Amaya, actor.
- March 4 – Ana Guevara, Athlete and Politician.
- May 2 – Carlos Hermosillo Arteaga, Chihuauhua politician (d. 2017).
- May 25 – Alberto Del Rio, pro wrestler
- June 29 – Eugenio Polgovsky, filmmaker, winner of Ariel Award (d. 2017).
- September 5 - Sin Cara, professional wrestler
- November 24 – David Alonso López, boxer (d. 2017).
- December 8 - Elsa Benítez, model and television host

== Deaths ==
- February 16 — Carlos Pellicer, poet (b. 1897)
- October 1 — Victorio Blanco, movie actor (b. 1893)

== Film ==
- List of Mexican films of 1977

== Sport ==
- 1976–77 Mexican Primera División season
- Tecolotes de Nuevo Laredo win the Mexican League
- 1977 Central American and Caribbean Championships in Athletics are held in Xalapa.
