= 1976 in Mexico =

- Decades: 1950s; 1960s; 1970s; 1980s; 1990s
- See also: History of Mexico; List of years in Mexico; Timeline of Mexican history

Events in the year 1976 in Mexico.

== Incumbents ==
=== Federal government ===
- President: Luis Echeverría (until 30 November), José López Portillo (starting 1 December)
- Interior Secretary (SEGOB): Mario Moya Palencia/Jesús Reyes Heroles
- Secretary of Foreign Affairs (SRE): Alfonso García Robles/Santiago Roel García
- Communications Secretary (SCT): Emilio Mújica Montoya
- Education Secretary (SEP): Víctor Bravo Ahuja/Porfirio Muñoz Ledo
- Secretary of Defense (SEDENA): Hermenegildo Cuenca Díaz/Félix Galván López
- Secretary of Navy: Ricardo Cházaro Lara
- Secretary of Labor and Social Welfare: Pedro Ojeda Paullada
- Secretary of Welfare: Luis Enrique Bracamontes/Pedro Ramírez Vázquez
- Tourism Secretary (SECTUR): Julio Hirschfeld Almada/Guillermo Rossell de la Lama

=== Supreme Court ===
- President of the Supreme Court: Mario G. Rebolledo Fernández

=== Governors ===
- Aguascalientes: José Refugio Esparza Reyes
- Baja California: Milton Castellanos Everardo
- Baja California Sur: Ángel César Mendoza Arámburo
- Campeche: Rafael Rodríguez Barrera
- Chiapas
  - Manuel Velasco Suárez (until November 30)
  - Jorge de la Vega Domínguez (starting December 1)
- Chihuahua: Manuel Bernardo Aguirre
- Coahuila: Oscar Flores Tapia
- Colima: Arturo Noriega Pizano
- Durango: Héctor Mayagoitia Domínguez
- Guanajuato: Luis H. Ducoing Gamba
- Guerrero: Rubén Figueroa Figueroa
- Hidalgo:
- Jalisco: Alberto Orozco Romero
- State of Mexico: Jorge Jiménez Cantú
- Michoacán: Carlos Torres Manzo
- Morelos
  - Felipe Rivera Crespo (PRI), until May 18
  - Armando León Bejarano (PRI), starting May 18
- Nayarit:
- Nuevo León: Pedro Zorrilla Martínez
- Oaxaca: Miguel Zárate Aquino
- Puebla: Toxqui Fernández de Lara
- Querétaro: Antonio Calzada Urquiza
- Quintana Roo: Jesús Martínez Ross
- San Luis Potosí: Guillermo Fonseca Álvarez
- Sinaloa: Alfonso G. Calderón
- Sonora: Alejandro Carrillo Marcor
- Tabasco: Mario Trujillo García
- Tamaulipas: Enrique Cárdenas González
- Tlaxcala: Emilio Sánchez Piedras
- Veracruz: Rafael Hernández Ochoa
- Yucatán
  - Carlos Loret de Mola Mediz (until January 31)
  - Francisco Luna Kan (starting February 1)
- Zacatecas: Fernando Pámanes Escobedo
- Regent of Mexico City
  - Octavio Senties Gomez
  - Carlos Hank González

== Events ==
- Instituto Tecnológico de Estudios Superiores de Monterrey (Campus Estado de México) founded.
- Organizacion Editorial Mexicana founded.
- Universidad Intercontinental established.
- March 15: Autonomous University of Baja California Sur established.
- July 4: 1976 Mexican general election
- September 7 – 11: Hurricane Kathleen
- September 29 – October 8: Hurricane Madeline
- October 1: Instituto Tecnológico de Nuevo León established.
- November 6: first issue of Proceso (magazine) published.
- December 15: The Trolleybuses in Guadalajara start operating.

== Awards ==
- Belisario Domínguez Medal of Honor – Jesús Romero Flores

== Births ==
- June 7: Nora Salinas, actress
- June 10: Mariana Seoane, model, singer, and actress
- July 8: Grettell Valdez, television and film actress and former fashion model
- December 3: Arleth Terán, soap opera actress

== Film ==
- List of Mexican films of 1976

== Sport ==
- 1975–76 Mexican Primera División season
- Diablos Rojos del México win the Mexican League
- Mexico at the 1976 Summer Olympics
- Mexico at the 1976 Summer Paralympics
- 1976 Central American and Caribbean Junior Championships in Athletics in Xalapa.
