= Tianguis Turístico =

Tourism Fair in Mexico

- Nickname: Tianguis Turístico México; Acapulco Tourism Market; Acapulco International Hotel and Travel Agency Fair (IHATA)
- Status: Active
- Genre: Tourism trade fair
- Frequency: Annual
- Country: Mexico
- Years active: 1975–present
- Organised by: Secretariat of Tourism (SECTUR)
- Website: https://tianguisturistico.com

Tianguis Turístico is an annual tourism trade fair predominantly held in Mexico Established in 1975 and organized by Mexico’s Secretariat of Tourism (SECTUR), the event is supported by both government and public resources.

The event was held exclusively in Acapulco from its founding until 2011. In 2012, Tianguis Turístico adopted an itinerant host‑city format that used destinations throughout Mexico but still maintained Acapulco as a recurring venue. The audience generally includes tourism officials, tour operators, travel agencies, airlines, hospitality companies, and media representatives.

== History ==
The event was first held in Acapulco in 1975 under the name Acapulco International Hotel and Travel Agency Fair (IHATA) and subsequently operated as the Acapulco Tourism Market. From its inception until 2011, the event was held annually in Acapulco with subsequent years adopting an itinerant host-city format.

In the early 2000s, Tianguis Turístico began systematically tracking participation indicators. Evaluations of the event were conducted by the Center for Competitiveness Studies (El Centro de Estudios de la Competitividad, CEC) starting in 2001 during the tenure of Executive Director Eduardo Chaillo (1998–2004). These reviews examined the effectiveness of Tianguis Turístico as a tourism promotion platform and aligned performance indicators with the National Tourism Program 2001–2006.

In 2011, Secretary of Tourism Gloria Guevara announced that the event would adopt an itinerant host‑city model, allowing different destinations within Mexico to host the trade show starting in 2012. SECTUR stated the change was intended to distribute the promotional and economic benefits of the event across multiple regions of the country.

In 2015, the Secretariat of Tourism announced that Acapulco would continue to host the event periodically within the rotating model and suggested this change would support Acapulco's tourism economy.

In 2020, the Tianguis Turístico Digital was held as a virtual marketplace in response to global travel restrictions during the COVID‑19 pandemic.

In 2025, Tianguis Turístico expanded to a bi‑national format for the first time, under Secretary of Tourism Josefina Rodríguez Zamora, incorporating venues in Baja California, Mexico and San Diego, California in the United States.

== Organization ==
The Tianguis Turístico is organized by the Secretariat of Tourism (Spanish: Secretaría de Turismo, SECTUR). From 1999–2018 it was led by the Mexico Tourism Board (Consejo de Promoción Turística de México - CPTM). Participants include representatives from Mexico’s tourism sector such as tourism service providers, state and municipal tourism agencies, tour operators, travel agencies, airlines, hospitality companies, and international media.

== Reception ==
Since the total number of participating countries starting being tracked in 2013, the resulting number of participating countries has varied over the years with no clearly visible trend by year or location. The highest recorded participation was the 2023 edition in Mexico City, which drew representatives from 90 countries followed by the 2017 edition in Acapulco with 88 participating countries. The lowest recorded total countries attending was in 2020 with 31 countries and this was also the only year where the event was held as a virtual marketplace in response to travel restrictions during the COVID‑19 pandemic.

Data provided by SECTUR suggests growth since adopting an itinerant host‑city model in 2012 when using the total number of business meetings and overall attendance as a performance indicator.

SECTUR's materials describe Tianguis Turistico as a contributing factor in the growth of Mexico's tourism sector. However, independent evaluations do not isolate a direct causal link between the event and Mexico's total tourism revenue. Academic and institutional reviews often discuss the event as one element within a broader government-led tourism strategy that encompasses events, infrastructure investments, and promotional resources targeting sustainable tourism development.

== Tianguis Turistico Host Cities ==
For the first 36 years, Tianguis Turistico was hosted in Acapulco, Mexico. When the model became itinerant, the host cities changed to various locations in Mexico, returning to Acapulco almost every other year. In 2025, the 50th anniversary event was hosted bi-nationally.

Year	Edition #	Host City	Location	# Countries	Ref
1975-2011	I–36	Acapulco	Acapulco International Center	—	—
2012	37	Puerto Vallarta	International Convention Center	—	—
2013	38	Puebla	Puebla Exhibition & Convention Center	42	
2014	39	Cancún	Lakám Center	60	
2015	40	Acapulco	Imperial World Expo	65	
2016	41	Guadalajara	Expo Guadalajara	75	
2017	42	Acapulco	Imperial World Expo	88	
2018	43	Mazatlán	Mazatlán International Convention Center	64	
2019	44	Acapulco	Imperial World Expo	45	
2020	—	Tianguis Turístico Digital	Virtual	31	
2021	45	Mérida	Yucatán Siglo XXI	45	
2022	46	Acapulco	Imperial World Expo	65	
2023	47	Mexico City	Citibanamex Center	90	
2024	48	Acapulco	Imperial World Expo	43	
2025	49	Rosarito / San Diego	Baja California Center (Mexico) / Liberty Station (USA)	44	
2026	50	Acapulco	Imperial World Expo	45	
2027	51	Puebla	Puebla Exhibition & Convention Center	TBD	
