= Hurricane Otis =

Category 5 Pacific hurricane in 2023

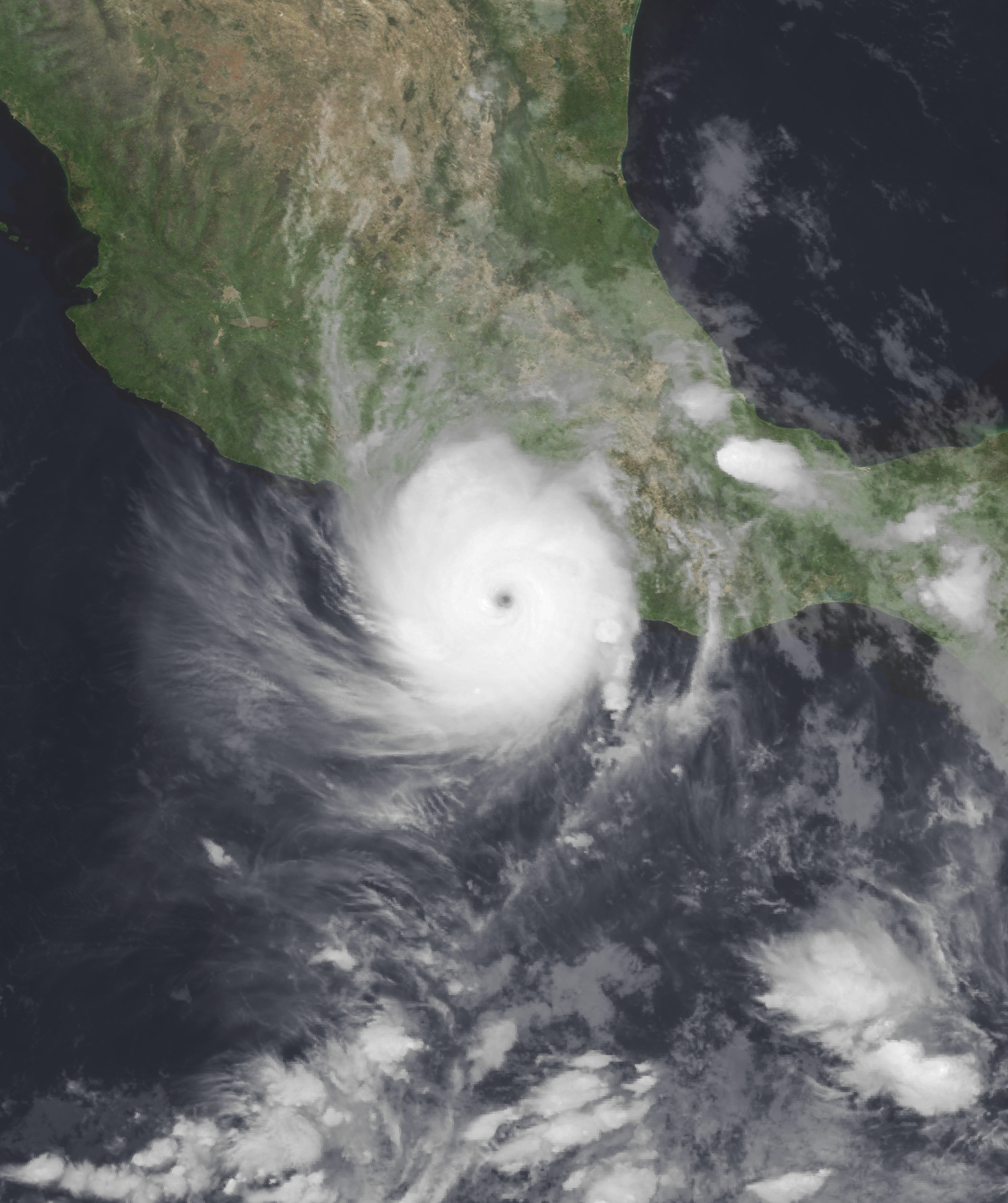
- Hurricane Otis approaching Guerrero at peak intensity on October 25

Meteorological history
- Formed: October 22, 2023
- Dissipated: October 25, 2023

Category 5 major hurricane
- 1-minute sustained (SSHWS/NWS)
- Highest winds: 165 mph (270 km/h)
- Lowest pressure: 922 mbar (hPa); 27.23 inHg

Overall effects
- Fatalities: ≥52 total (Note: Official government figure, which has been disputed. See Casualties section.)
- Missing: ≥32
- Damage: $12–16 billion (2023 USD) (Costliest Pacific hurricane on record; costliest in Mexican history)
- Areas affected: Southern Mexico
- IBTrACS /
- Part of the 2023 Pacific hurricane season

Hurricane Otis was a compact but very powerful tropical cyclone that made a devastating landfall near the Mexican city of Acapulco as a Category 5 hurricane in October 2023. Otis was the first Pacific hurricane on record to make landfall at Category 5 intensity and became the strongest Pacific hurricane to make landfall, surpassing Hurricane Patricia of 2015. The resulting damage made Otis the costliest tropical cyclone to strike Mexico on record, surpassing Hurricane Wilma of 2005. The fifteenth tropical storm, tenth hurricane, eighth major hurricane, (Note: A major hurricane is one that ranks at Category 3 or higher on the Saffir–Simpson scale.) and second Category 5 hurricane of the 2023 Pacific hurricane season, Otis originated from a disturbance several hundred miles south of the Gulf of Tehuantepec. Initially forecast to stay offshore and to only be a weak tropical storm at peak intensity, Otis instead underwent explosive intensification to reach peak winds of 165 mph (270 km/h) and weakened only slightly before making landfall as a powerful Category 5 hurricane. Once inland, the hurricane quickly weakened before dissipating the following day.

Making landfall just west of Acapulco, Otis's powerful winds severely damaged many of the buildings in the city. Landslides and flooding resulted from heavy rain. Communication was heavily cut off, initially leaving information about the hurricane's impact largely unknown. In the aftermath, the city had no drinking water and many residents also lost power. The government of Guerrero mobilized thousands of military members to aid survivors and assist in recovery efforts. Thousands of recovery items were sent out to those affected and donations were sent out to each of the affected families.

The hurricane caused at least 52 deaths and left 32 others missing. Total damage from Otis was estimated to be in the billions of dollars (2023 USD), with several agencies estimating $12–16 billion in damage, making it the costliest Pacific hurricane on record, surpassing Hurricane Manuel in 2013.

== Meteorological history ==
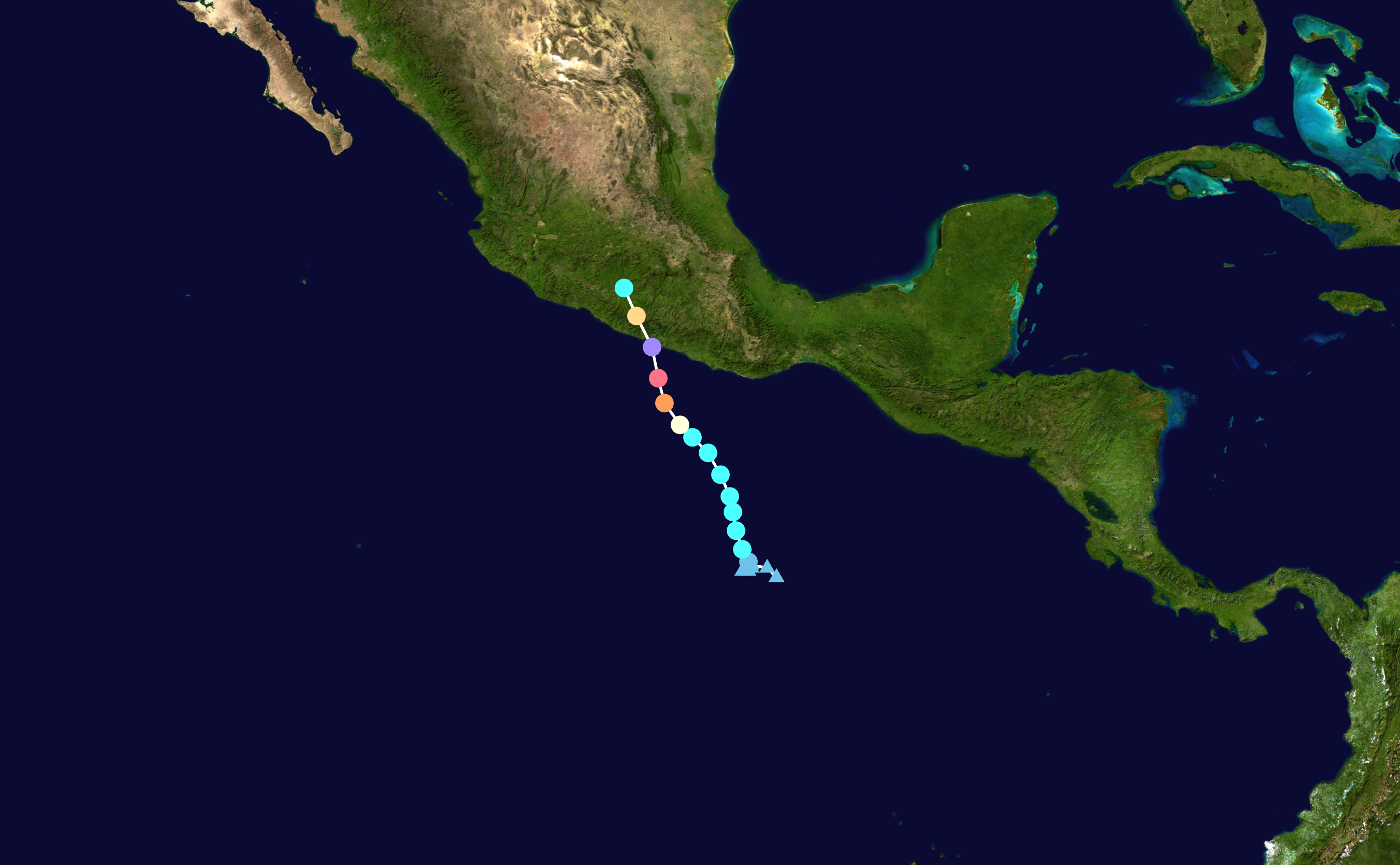
Map plotting the storm's track and intensity, according to the Saffir–Simpson scale Map key Saffir–Simpson scale Tropical depression (≤38 mph, ≤62 km/h) Tropical storm (39–73 mph, 63–118 km/h) Category 1 (74–95 mph, 119–153 km/h) Category 2 (96–110 mph, 154–177 km/h) Category 3 (111–129 mph, 178–208 km/h) Category 4 (130–156 mph, 209–251 km/h) Category 5 (≥157 mph, ≥252 km/h) Unknown Storm type Tropical cyclone Subtropical cyclone Extratropical cyclone, remnant low, tropical disturbance, or monsoon depression

On October 15, 2023, the National Hurricane Center (NHC) noted that an area of low pressure was expected to form several hundred miles south of southeastern Mexico over the next seven days. This forecast came to fruition on October 18 with the development of a broad low several hundred miles south of the Gulf of Tehuantepec. Accompanied by disorganized convection, organization into a tropical cyclone was deemed likely within five days as the system meandered in the same general area. Convection grew in scope the following day, though upper-level wind shear displaced this to the west of the system's center. Throughout October 21, convection increased in coverage and the system's surface circulation became more defined. The disturbance's meandering motion shifted to a northward crawl as it was wedged between a ridge to the northeast and a trough to the northwest. Following further convective organization, the system became Tropical Depression Eighteen-E at 12:00 UTC (07:00 a.m. CDT) on October 22. At this time, the depression was situated roughly 535 mi (860 km) south-southeast of Acapulco, Mexico. Six hours later, the system intensified into a tropical storm, at which time it was assigned the name Otis.

Light to moderate southeasterly wind shear displaced convection northwest of Otis's surface circulation during the overnight hours of October 22–23. The lack of vertical alignment and dry mid-level air delayed potential intensification despite an otherwise favorable environment consisting of high sea surface temperatures and abundant atmospheric moisture. Sea surface temperatures ahead of the system averaged 86–88 °F (30–31 °C), above average for this time of year. The high temperatures resulted from a combination of a record-warm September for Mexico, an ongoing El Niño, and the influence of global warming. The system's motion shifted from due north to north-northwest during this time, remaining around 4–5 mph (6–8 km/h). A convective band developed halfway around the storm by the afternoon of October 23, and the surface circulation and thunderstorm activity moved closer together. During the overnight of October 23–24, the storm moved into a region of more favorable conditions, with higher sea surface temperatures and weaker vertical wind shear. Microwave satellite imagery depicted a low-level ring structure, often a precursor to rapid intensification, despite the overall sheared appearance of the system. The storm's forward motion also increased during this time, potentially offsetting the negative impacts of southeasterly wind shear. As a result, upper-level outflow expanded noticeably and the system's core became centered in the convection. This led to Otis beginning an explosive intensification phase that would continue until just before landfall. As the morning of October 24 progressed, outflow continued to expand in all directions atop Otis and many banding features circulated the storm. The improvement in outflow was accentuated by a powerful jet streak—a wind maxima within the jet stream—which accelerated the rate of latent heat dispersal and fostered convective development. Otis commenced explosive intensification and became a hurricane by 12:00 UTC (07:00 a.m. CDT) on October 24.

Shortly after 18:00 UTC (1:00 p.m. CDT), the only Air Force Reserve Unit Hurricane Hunter mission flown into Otis penetrated its eye, and the observations indicated that Otis had already reached Category 3 intensity and thus become a major hurricane. This was substantially above estimates using the Dvorak technique, which ranged from only 70 mph (110 km/h) to 105 mph (165 km/h); Otis was persistently stronger than indicated by the Dvorak technique throughout the rapid intensification phase. Operationally, the NHC had only upgraded Otis to a Category 1 hurricane on the Saffir-Simpson scale. Explosive intensification continued throughout the day into the nighttime hours, in what was described as a "nightmare scenario" by Eric Blake at the NHC. A prominent pinhole eye developed as the night progressed, surrounded by intense convection reaching −103 to −112 °F (−75 to −80 °C). Otis reached its peak intensity as a Category 5 hurricane with maximum sustained winds of 165 mph (270 km/h) and a minimum central pressure of 922 mb (27.23 inHg) at 03:00 UTC on October 25 (10:00 p.m. CDT, October 24)–just nine hours after attaining Category 3 intensity–while located just 60 mi (95 km) south-southeast of Acapulco. Immense lightning activity occurred throughout the intensification phase, approximately 26,000 strikes in 24 hours, with the greatest activity taking place in the 55 minutes leading up to landfall. As Otis neared landfall, satellite images showed some cooling and filling in of the eye, suggesting that the storm weakened slightly before landfall. By 05:45 UTC (12:45 a.m. CDT), Isla de La Roqueta entered the hurricane's eyewall and the storm's core made landfall just west of Acapulco around 06:45 UTC (1:45 a.m. CDT) just below peak intensity, though still at Category 5 intensity, with winds of 160 mph (260 km/h) and a minimum central pressure of 929 mb (27.43 inHg). Once onshore, the hurricane rapidly weakened as it interacted with the mountains of the Sierra Madre del Sur. Within two hours, its eye disappeared from satellite imagery and lightning activity ceased. Utilizing statistical inland decay models, the NHC estimated Otis to have fallen below hurricane status by 18:00 UTC (1:00 p.m. CDT). The storm's surface circulation dissipated shortly thereafter, marking the cessation of Otis's time as a tropical cyclone.

=== Forecast errors and distinctions ===
Pacific hurricanes with a wind speed of 130 mph (215 km/h) or higher at landfall
Hurricane	Season	Wind speed	Ref.
Otis	2023	160 mph (260 km/h)	
Patricia	2015	150 mph (240 km/h)	
Madeline	1976	145 mph (230 km/h)	
Twelve	1957	140 mph (220 km/h)	
"Mexico"	1959	140 mph (220 km/h)	
Iniki	1992	140 mph (220 km/h)	
Kenna	2002	140 mph (220 km/h)	
Lidia	2023	140 mph (220 km/h)	

The rapid intensification of Otis was among the most poorly forecast in the modern era. Meteorologists Jeff Masters and Bob Henson at Yale University called the underestimation "one of the biggest and most consequential forecast-model misses of recent years". Numerical weather prediction models failed to capture the magnitude of explosive intensification that occurred, in part due to a dearth of data. Several experts, including director of the National Hurricane Center Michael Brennan, noted that there are very few instruments — such as ocean buoys or radar — available for evaluating hurricane strength in the East Pacific, leaving forecasters reliant on satellite data. As described by The New York Times, forecasts of Otis upon its formation on October 22 "didn’t show much to be concerned about". In their first advisory, the NHC forecast a peak intensity of just 45 mph (75 km/h), 120 mph (195 km/h) lower than its actual peak intensity, with the system moving north-northwest and later west away from the Mexican coastline. Forecasters John Cangialosi and Lisa Bucci noted that many models showed the storm outright dissipating within five days.

Early on October 23, Blake noted that models were incorrectly diagnosing conditions and showing Otis intertwined with the Intertropical Convergence Zone. He adjusted his forecast to show a faster motion which would bring the system onto the Mexican coastline on October 26. Later that day, forecasters Cangialosi and Sandy Delgado noted a substantial disparity in various model solutions, with results differing based on how vertically aligned the storm would become or not become. Conditions for a more potent system became more apparent during the overnight hours of October 23–24. This included high sea surface temperatures, lower wind shear, and abundant moisture. The system also became vertically aligned. The Statistical Hurricane Intensity Prediction Scheme (SHIPS) rapid intensification index increased to 25 percent, leading forecasters to raise their intensity predictions above most model outputs. At 09:00 UTC (4:00 a.m. CDT) on October 24, less than 24 hours before landfall, the NHC expected Otis to intensify into a Category 1 hurricane as it moved ashore. Sixteen hours prior to landfall, the system was forecast to move ashore at least five hours later than it actually did. The dramatic rate of intensification was not apparent until reconnaissance aircraft sampled the storm during the afternoon of October 24. At 00:00 UTC on October 25 (7:00 p.m. CDT, October 24), just under six and a half hours before the storm made landfall, the NHC upgraded Otis to a Category 4 hurricane and explicitly forecast it to become a Category 5 hurricane before making landfall.

The rate of Hurricane Otis's intensification was among the fastest observed in the satellite era. In a 21-hour period, the hurricane's maximum sustained winds increased by 105 mph (165 km/h), ranking it as the second-fastest in the basin, only behind Hurricane Patricia in 2015, which increased by 120 mph (195 km/h) in a period of 24 hours. With winds of 160 mph (260 km/h), Otis became the first Pacific hurricane on record to make landfall at Category 5 intensity, surpassing Hurricane Patricia accordingly. Overall, it was tied with Hurricane Gilbert of 1988 in the Atlantic as the fourth-strongest landfalling Mexican hurricane by sustained wind speed, behind the following Atlantic hurricanes, each with sustained winds of 175 mph (280 km/h): Janet in 1955, Anita in 1977, and Dean in 2007. Masters and Henson surmised Otis's landfall saw the most people impacted by the eyewall of a Category 5 hurricane. They further stated the only hurricane of comparison was Hurricane Andrew in 1992, which struck the Miami metropolitan area at Category 5 strength (producing such winds in parts of southern Miami-Dade County).

== Preparations ==
Enhanced infrared imagery of Otis making landfall near Acapulco, Guerrero, on October 25

The Government of Mexico issued a tropical storm warning and a hurricane watch for areas east of Tecpan de Galeana to Lagunas de Chacahua at 03:00 UTC October 24. As the storm approached land and intensified further, a hurricane warning was issued for the Guerrero coastline between Punta Maldonado and Zihuatanejo at 09:00 UTC October 24, 21 hours before landfall. In response to the approach of Hurricane Otis, the Guerrero state government opened 396 shelters to accommodate residents displaced by the heavy wind and storm surge damage. Mexico's army and navy sent 8,000 troops to support aid and rescue operations. Authorities in Guerrero closed Acapulco's main port. Schools across Guerrero were to be closed ahead of Otis's anticipated landfall. All flights in and out of Acapulco International Airport were cancelled.

In its advisory upgrading Otis to a Category 5 hurricane, 3 hours and 45 minutes before landfall, the NHC described the situation as a "nightmare scenario" and warned that "This is an extremely serious situation for the Acapulco metropolitan area with the core of the destructive hurricane likely to come near or over that large city early on Wednesday. There are no hurricanes on record even close to this intensity for this part of Mexico".

== Impact ==
Directorate-General for European Civil Protection and Humanitarian Aid Operations (DG ECHO) daily situation map for Mexico on October 25

Hurricane Otis made landfall in Acapulco as a Category 5 hurricane on October 25, making it by far the strongest hurricane to ever strike this area of Mexico. On October 30, the National Autonomous University of Mexico tweeted that data from two weather stations in Acapulco Bay were recovered. One station measured peak sustained winds of 113.64 mph (182.88 km/h) with a gust to 204.90 mph (329.76 km/h) at 05:40 UTC (12:40 a.m. CDT). If verified, this would be the seventh highest anemometer-measured wind gust recorded worldwide. A minimum pressure of 963.5 mb (28.45 inHg) was also observed at 05:50 UTC (12:50 a.m. CDT). A weather station on Isla de La Roqueta offshore western Acapulco recorded a maximum wind gust of 135 mph (217 km/h) as the eyewall moved across the city. Peak sustained winds of 82 mph (132 km/h) were also reported by the station. The storm surge was catastrophic near and east of the point of landfall, but a lack of tide station data prevented a quantitative estimate of the height.

=== Damage ===
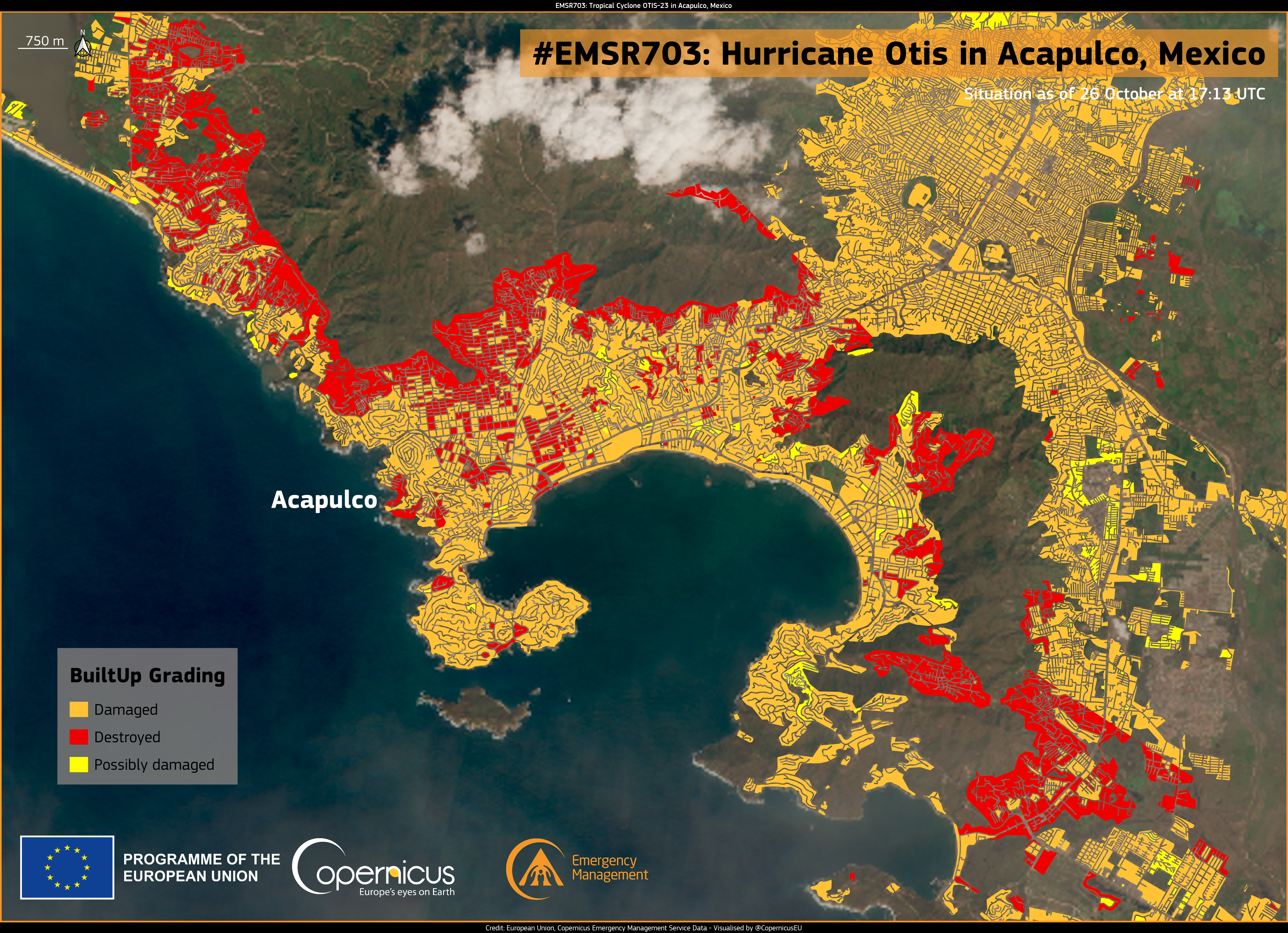
Analysis of damage in Acapulco Color key: Destroyed structures; Damaged structures; Possibly damaged structures

Across Guerrero, 37 transmission lines, 26 electrical substations, a power generation plant, and 10,000 light poles were downed, resulting in more than 500,000 households losing power, although service was quickly restored to 200,000 and was fully restored on November 1. Throughout Acapulco, 51,864 houses were destroyed, while 79,510 others suffered severe damage and 80,823 other homes suffered minor or moderate damage. A total of 3,813 people necessitated air rescue through 62 flights while 20,047 others evacuated via bus. About 80% of all hotels in Acapulco sustained damage, including reports of flooding and collapsed ceilings inside hotels. Several buildings were also heavily damaged or collapsed. Eighteen radio stations in Acapulco were downed, and communication was cut off in the city. The city also lost access to drinking water. A total of 110 medical facilities were out of operation due to the storm, but 80% of such facilities had re-opened by November 7. All supermarkets were closed or destroyed in the city, although four partially re-opened within a week and a half. Additionally, three shopping centers in Acapulco were destroyed, and a section of a highway leading into the city was closed after a landslide. Strong winds and heavy rains damaged other communities outside of the city. Coyuca de Benitez experienced flooding as well as downed trees and damaged roofs. In the community of Yetla, most houses lost their roof and the water supply system was destroyed. Forty-one sections of highways were damaged throughout Guerrero. A large amount of the state's crop yield, which was valued at 25.2 billion pesos in 2022, was destroyed. Offshore, 480 public tourist boats were destroyed. At least 33 vessels sank in Acapulco Bay. Five boats were rescued offshore Playa Manzanillo while two small vessels were found in the bay of Puerto Marqués. Further inland, ten road accidents occurred in the Toluca Valley in the state of Mexico, resulting in two deaths. Statewide, 478 individuals were injured, 98 of whom required hospitalization.

Several airlines were impacted by Otis, with service on Aeroméxico, Volaris, Viva Aerobus, United Airlines and American were affected and suspended at Acapulco and Zihuatanejo. Acapulco International Airport, which was closed to all flights, was inaccessible. Additionally, the Pie de la Cuesta Air Force Base near Acapulco was damaged, which made it difficult for rescue operations. Otis's passage knocked offline a significant part of the seismic network in Guerrero owned by SkyAlert, an earthquake warning app used widely in Mexico, as well as the SASMEX Network, another network owned by CIRES, responsible of broadcasting alerts through public speakers and radio signals. Twenty-seven sensors were affected throughout Guerrero and parts of neighboring states Michoacán and Oaxaca, as well as two broadcast towers in the cities of Acapulco and Chilpancingo, hindering the ability to notify major cities both close and farther away prone to damage in case an earthquake occurs along the coasts of those three states. By October 28, 19 of the sensors had been restored.

Losses were estimated at about 269 billion pesos (US$15 billion) by the natural disaster risk analysis firm Enki Research, and at more than US$10 billion by global reinsurance firm Gallagher Re., meaning Otis exceeds Hurricane Wilma as Mexico's most expensive weather disaster ever recorded at US$7.5 billion. Fitch Ratings estimated that Otis was responsible for 287 billion pesos (US$16.2 billion) in economic losses. Tourism authorities considered Otis the worst hurricane to hit Acapulco, with its impact more severe than both Hurricane Pauline and Hurricane Manuel. Government officials believed that it would cost 200–300 billion pesos (US$11.3–16.9 billion) to repair the damage in Acapulco. Officials estimated that as a result of the storm, the Guerrero gross domestic product will decline by 16% by the start of 2024. Citigroup estimated that economic activity in the final quarter of 2023 would shrink by 40% due to the hurricane. According to Reuters, Mexican business groups estimate damage at $16 billion as of November 17, 2023. According to Aon Benfield, damage is estimated at $15.3 billion as of 2024. Based on these and other reports, the NHC determined that Otis caused $12–16 billion of damage and that it was thus the costliest Mexican hurricane on record, surpassing Hurricane Wilma in the Atlantic.

=== Casualties ===
As of December 21, 2023, the official figures stand at 52 people killed and 32 missing, with three foreigners included in the death toll as well as at least two students attending the Autonomous University of Guerrero (AUG). In the village of Kilómetro 30, a two-year-old girl was swept away when the current tore her from her mother's arms. A total of 59 people were reported missing, including 11 Americans and 7 other foreign nationals. Early media reports of an additional 16 fatalities following a power outage at a Mexican Social Security Institute hospital were denied by the government. Local officials told the Washington Post that they had counted 120 dead or missing, including 20 bodies that washed up onto Acapulco beach or by the docks, 10 bodies that were found floating in the ocean 16 kilometres (10 mi) west of Acapulco, two people who were missing from a vessel of three, and three people who died at sea on a four-person boat.

Locals have criticized the official death toll as an underestimate, to which President Andrés Manuel López Obrador responded by accusing his opponents of making the death toll a political issue. At the time of the first death toll estimate of 27, López Obrador said that "even though the death of any person is unfortunate, there weren't very many". On November 12, a report emerged indicating that Acapulco's funeral homes had calculated a total of at least 350 deaths. The following day, municipal authorities dismissed the report as "speculation" and, during a press conference, López Obrador reiterated that the official death toll remained at 48.

== Aftermath ==
Costliest Pacific hurricanes
Rank	Cyclone	Season	Damage	Ref
1	5 Otis	2023	$12–16 billion	
2	1 Manuel	2013	$4.2 billion	
3	4 Iniki	1992	$3.1 billion	
4	3 John	2024	$2.45 billion	
5	4 Odile	2014	$1.82 billion	
6	TS Agatha	2010	$1.1 billion	
7	4 Hilary	2023	$948 million	
8	5 Willa	2018	$825 million	
9	1 Madeline	1998	$750 million	
10	2 Rosa	1994	$700 million	

According to the National Institute of Statistics and Geography (INEGI), the state of Guerrero was the least prepared state for a natural disaster. Although there were 14 civil protection public servants per 100,000 inhabitants, half of those are dedicated to administrative functions, one quarter of those are firefighters, and less than 15% of servants can aid in search and rescue. Nevertheless, the government of Guerrero mobilized 30 to 40 trucks to transport displaced tourists to shelter. With resources totaling approximately US$1.7 billion, the government initially believed it had the economic resources necessary to repair the damage to Guerrero, although the congressional bloc of Morena offered an additional 10 million pesos in aid on October 26. On November 1, the federal government announced 61.3 billion pesos in investments for reconstruction, including 18 billion for infrastructure recovery and 10 billion worth of tax breaks, 45,000 additional scholarships to Acapulco students, hiring 10,000 young people to aid in cleanup efforts, and free electricity through February 2024. This free electricity program was extended until June 2024. On November 3, the federal government announced that each of the 250,000 affected families in Acapulco and Coyuca de Benítez would receive weekly baskets of foodstuffs over the following three months, totaling between 2 billion and 3 billion pesos. However, the federal government rejected calls from the Chamber of Deputies to use oil surpluses, estimated to total up to 80 billion pesos, to fund additional recovery efforts. Citigroup criticized the federal government package as insufficient. A sit in outside the National Palace was organized to protest the lack of government assistance, in which 50 people participated. Victims petitioned the Mexican Senate to demand the establishment of a 300 billion pesos trust.

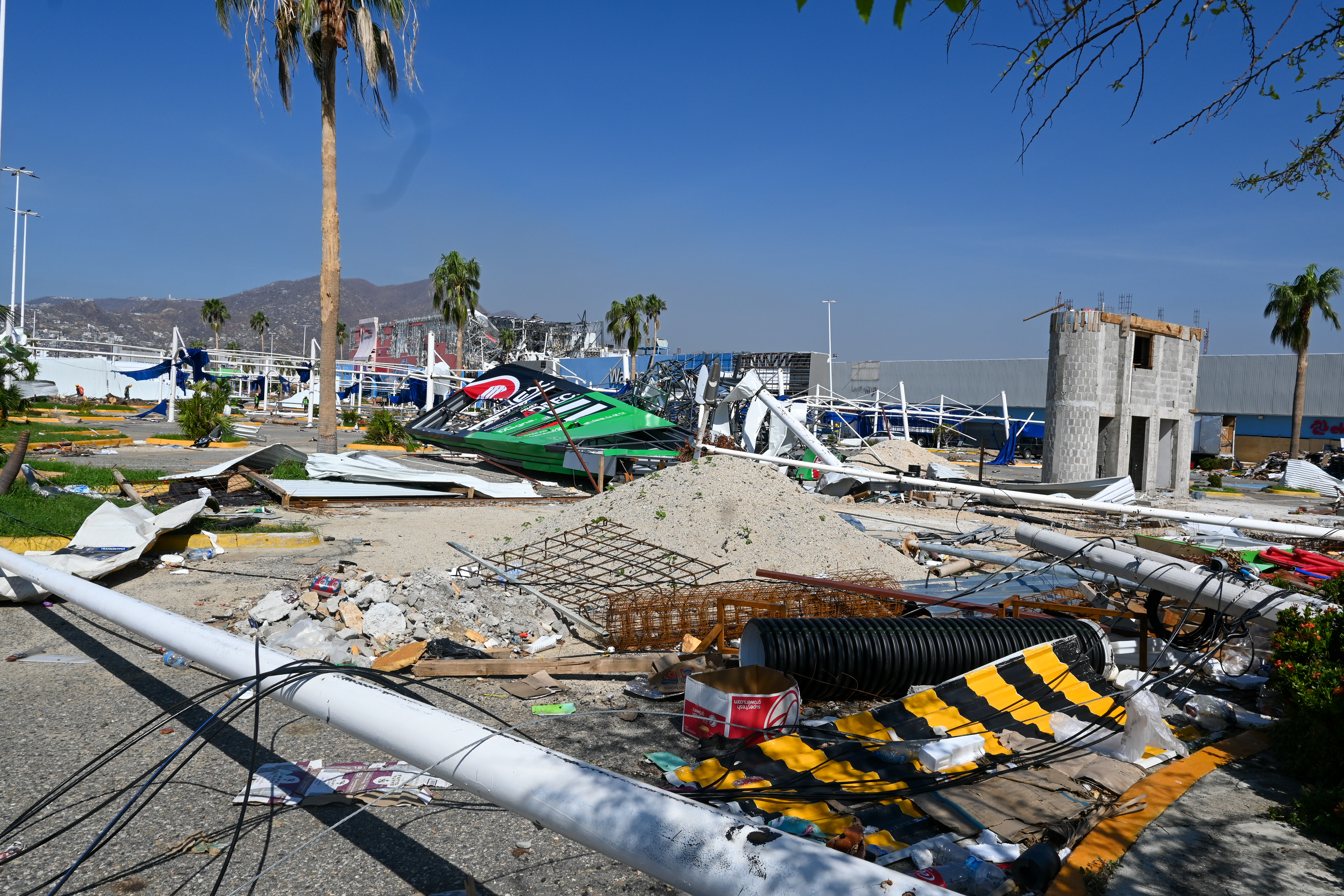
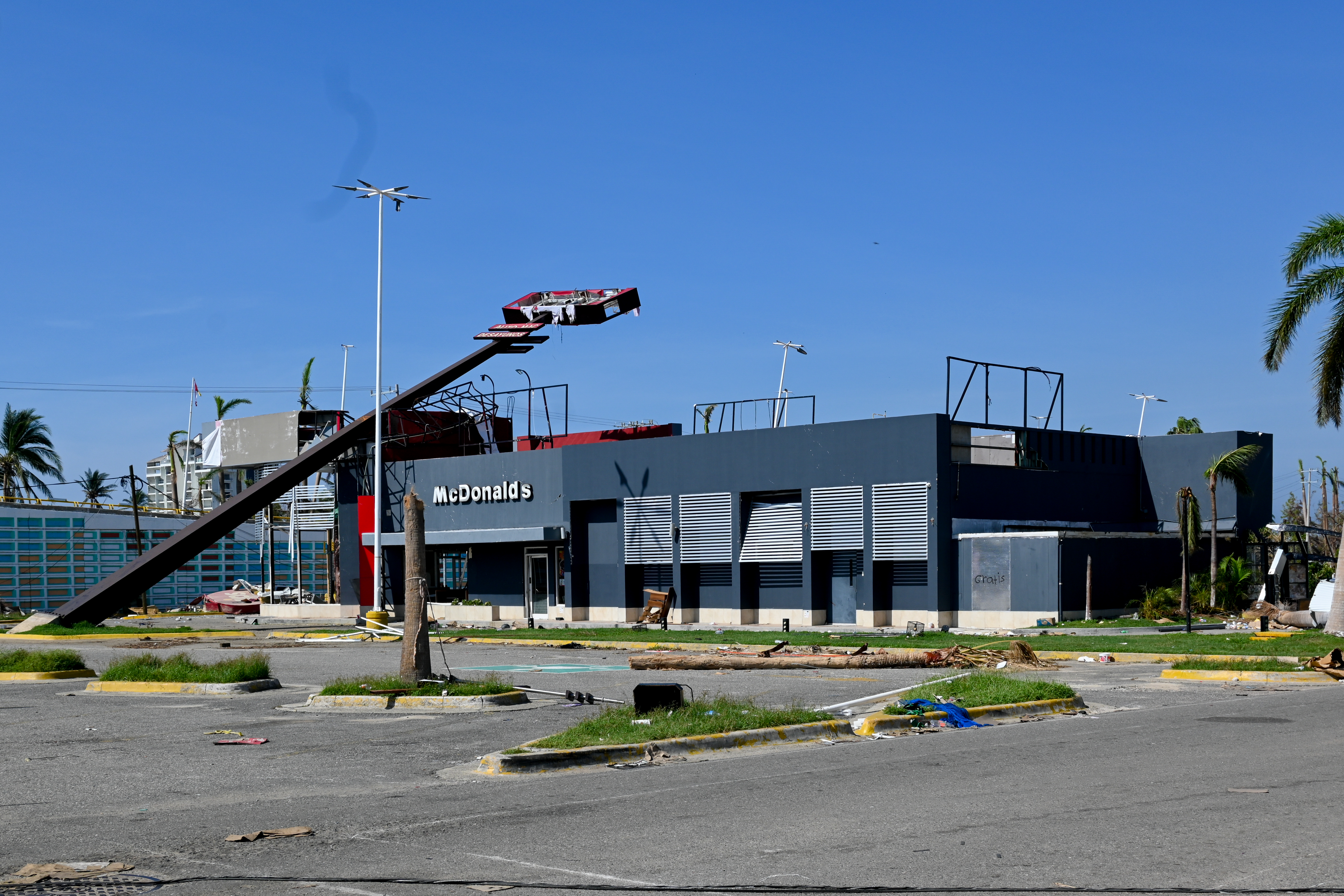

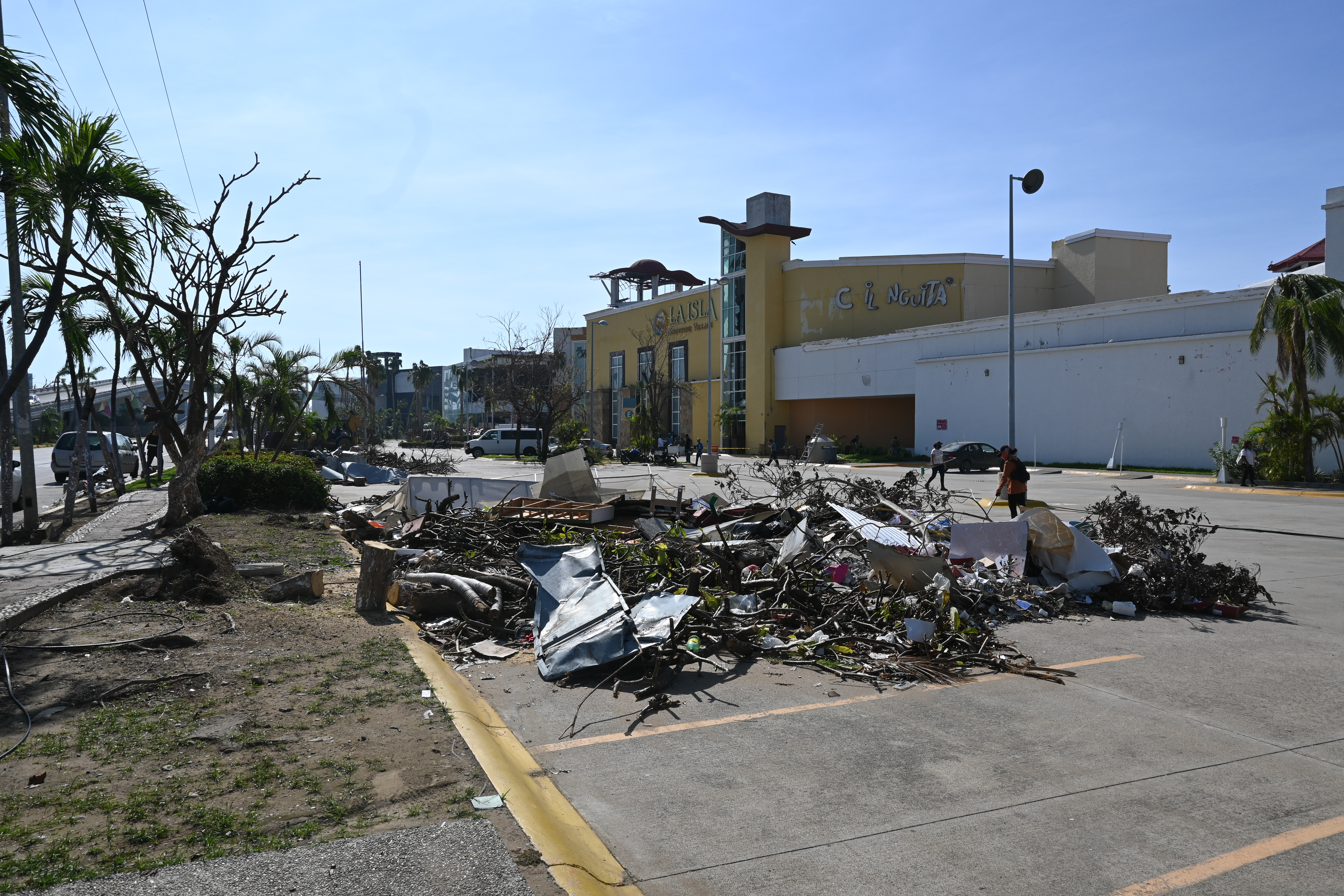
Aftermath of Hurricane Otis in Acapulco

In addition to financial assistance, 47 of Guerrero's 81 municipalities were initially declared a disaster area, but this was later reduced to cover only two municipalities (Acapulco and Coyuca de Benítez). Ten doctors from Michoacán were flown in to Acapulco to assist with recovery efforts. By October 28, the government provided 8,100 liters (1,800 imp gal; 2,100 U.S. gal) of food supplies and 16,000 liters (3,500 imp gal; 4,200 U.S. gal) of water to Acapulco. By November 1, the government had delivered 63,000 food packages and 1,600,000 liters (350,000 imp gal; 420,000 U.S. gal) of water. By November 4, the government had delivered 1,874,400 liters (412,300 imp gal; 495,200 U.S. gal) of water, including to 11,350,000 liters (2,500,000 imp gal; 3,000,000 U.S. gal) to hospitals, 60,000 liters (13,000 imp gal; 16,000 U.S. gal) to shelters, and 385,000 liters (85,000 imp gal; 102,000 U.S. gal) to water treatment plants. By November 5, they delivered 204,092 meals. By November 7, 8,602 kilograms (18,964 lb) of cargo had been airlifted. A total of 37,000 liters (8,100 imp gal; 9,800 U.S. gal) of diesel, 80,000 liters (18,000 imp gal; 21,000 U.S. gal) of gasoline and 35,000 liters (7,700 imp gal; 9,200 U.S. gal) of jet fuel was distributed by the government. The military distributed 97,805 food supplies, 36,400 kilograms (80,200 lb) of tortillas, and 145,000 food rations through 13 dining rooms and five community kitchens. The Mexican Navy alone provided 4,000 groceries, 156,450 liters (34,410 imp gal; 41,330 U.S. gal) of water, over 13,000 kilograms (29,000 lb) of supplies, including 2,000 kilograms (4,400 lb) of personal hygiene and medical items, and packaged 33,243 meals. At the naval hospital, 1,037 medical consultations were given, including 16 surgeries. The military also provided 2,345 medical consultations and made 11 medical evacuations, 10 by air and 1 by land. On November 2, they distributed 120,000 liters (26,000 imp gal; 32,000 U.S. gal) to five hospitals in Acapulco, which were operating at 10% of capacity.

By November 3, normal operations had been reestablished at 37 gas stations, with a total inventory of 24,500,000 liters (5,400,000 imp gal; 6,500,000 U.S. gal) of fuel. By November 6, normal operations had been resumed at 60 gas stations, or 75% of gas stations in Acapulco. Local authorities estimated that they had cleaned up 250 metric tons (250 long tons; 280 short tons) of garbage along coastal areas of Acapulco.

The Tax Administration Service (SAT) delayed all tax deadlines for residents until November 10. The Secretary of National Defense launched a food collection drive in Nuevo Laredo. The Mexican Red Cross delivered 75 metric tons (74 long tons; 83 short tons) of humanitarian aid and mobilized 300 volunteers in Acapulco. Walmart offered to match all donations made to the victims of the storm. Banco Santander offered to suspend loan payments for all victims for six months. The National Autonomous University of Mexico (UNAM) delivered 562,000 kg (1,239,000 lb) of aid. AUG provided 50 buses for victims to travel between Acapulco and Chilpancingo. The United States government provided Mexico with equipment to re-open the roads and said it would honor any requests from the Mexican government for assistance. The Association of Banks of Mexico launched a payment deferral program that an estimated 300,000 individuals were eligible for, totaling 22 billion pesos. Some tolls on Federal Highway 95D were lifted in order to aid in relief efforts. Free bus service was offered from Acapulco to Mexico City through November 5. Telmex offered free services for all of Acapulco for November and December 2023. Eleven charging stations were opened in which individuals could use for up to 15 minutes. Widespread looting also occurred throughout the city after the storm, prompting President López Obrador to deploy 14,700 members of the National Guard to erect checkpoints in response. According to local business owners, the looting led to a 70% increase in food prices in the city.

Despite the damage, some hotels sought to resume operations in time for the holiday season. In addition, 35 hotels promised the federal government that they would re-open by the end of March 2024. The Secretariat of Tourism also announced that the Tianguis Turístico annual tourism fair set to be held in Acapulco in April 2024 would not be cancelled.

== Retirement ==
Due to the extensive damage and deaths the hurricane caused in Guerrero, the World Meteorological Organization retired the name Otis from the eastern Pacific hurricane naming list in March 2024, and it will never be used again in the basin. It was replaced with Otilio for the 2029 season.

== See also ==
- Weather of 2023
- Tropical cyclones in 2023
- Timeline of the 2023 Pacific hurricane season
- List of Category 5 Pacific hurricanes
- List of Mexico hurricanes

- Hurricane Bridget (1971) – Category 2 hurricane which is considered to be one of the worst hurricanes to hit Acapulco
- Hurricane Pauline (1997) – Category 4 hurricane that severely impacted Acapulco and killed more than 300 people
- Hurricane Kenna (2002) – Category 5 hurricane that made landfall further northwest in Mexico and which was also initially forecast to only be a weak tropical storm at peak intensity
- Hurricane Manuel (2013) – Category 1 hurricane that caused widespread damage in Acapulco and its surrounding areas
- Hurricane John (2024) – Category 3 hurricane that made landfall further south in Guerrero and which also underwent rapid intensification
- Hurricane Erick (2025) – Category 4 hurricane that made landfall at Punta Maldonado in Guerrero and which also underwent rapid intensification.
