= Universidad del Caribe (Mexico) =

Public university in Cancun, Mexico

University of the Caribbean
- Universidad del Caribe
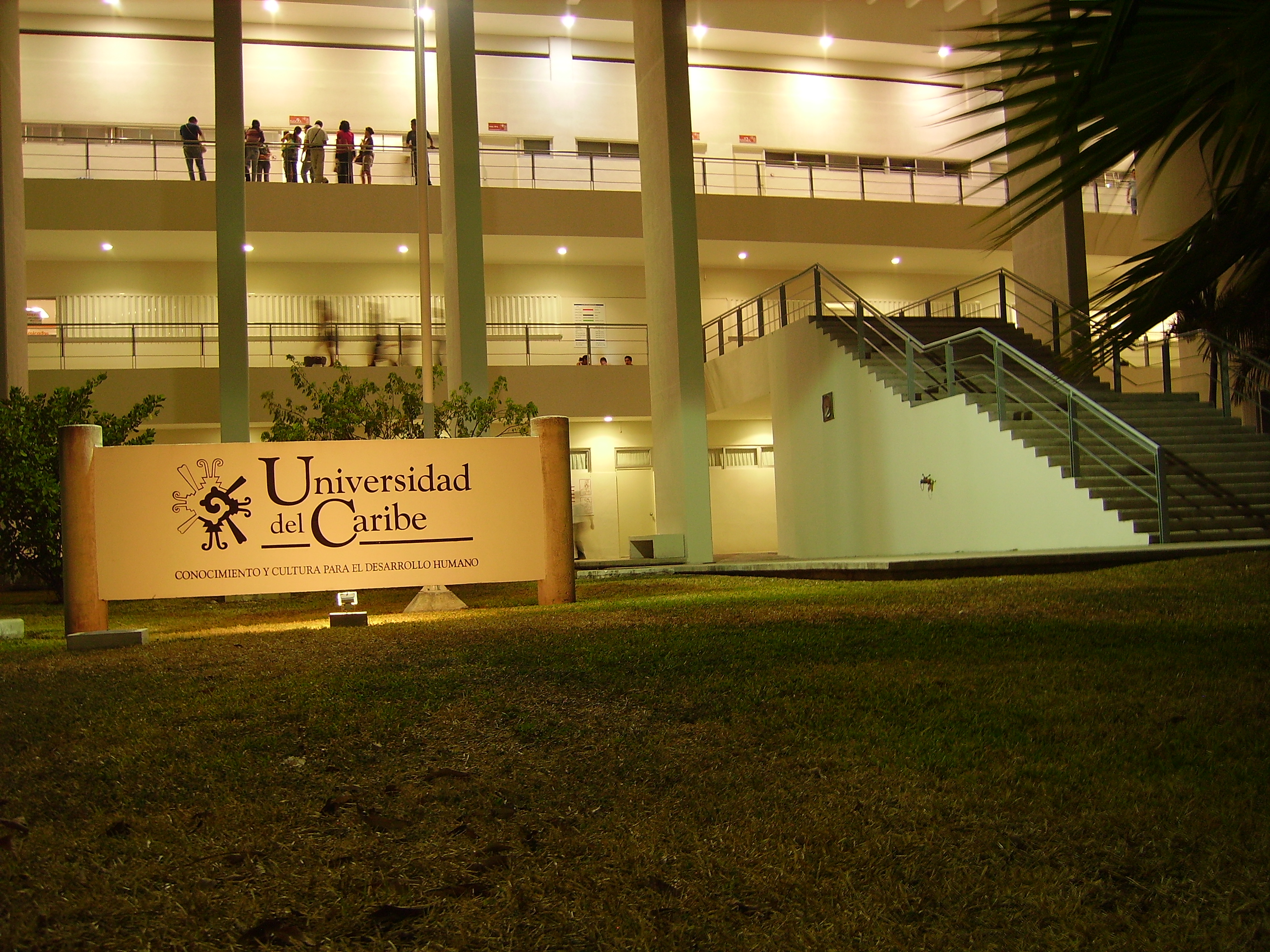
- Other names: "Unicaribe"
- Motto: "Conocimiento y cultura para el desarrollo humano."
- Motto in English: "Knowledge and culture for human development."
- Type: Public
- Established: 29 September 2000
- Rector: Lic. Marisol Vanegas Pérez
- Academic staff: 447
- Students: 2,912 (October 2015)
- Location: SM. 78, Mza. 1, Lote 1, Esquina Fraccionamiento Tabachines, Cancún, Quintana Roo, CP. 77528, Mexico; 21°12′10″N 86°49′27″E
- Website: www.unicaribe.mx

The University of the Caribbean is a public university in the city of Cancun, Mexico. It was founded by decree of then governor of Quintana Roo, Joaquín Hendricks Díaz, on 29 September 2000. In 2016, the Reader's Digest magazine published a national ranking of the 100 best universities in Mexico, in which the University of the Caribbean is ranked 94th. The university currently has four engineering programs, four undergraduate programs, twelve diploma courses, ten workshops, and seven Master's degrees.

The university is a member of the Inter-American Conference on Social Security, an international organization promoting the development of social security in the Americas.

== Antonio Enríquez Savignac Library ==
The university's library, named for Antonio Enríquez Savignac, is open to the public, specialized in the areas of sustainable tourism and hotels, gastronomy, economics and business, industrial engineering, telematic engineering, and human development. It is a depository library of the World Tourism Organization, the Organisation for Economic Co-operation and Development (OECD), and the National Institute of Statistics and Geography (INEGI).

The library was created with the University in 2000, has more than 10,293 titles, 30,082 volumes, 1,048 linear meters of shelving, and 2,847 internal users.
