= Rodolfo Elizondo Torres =

Mexican politician

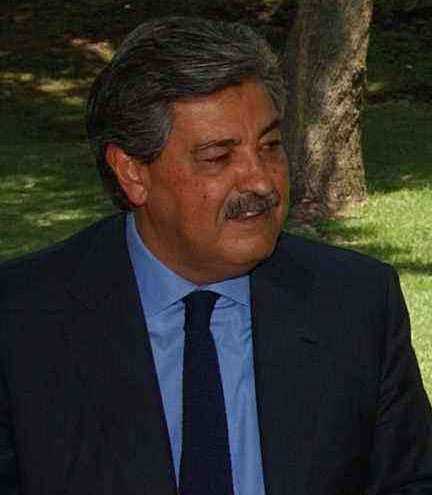
Rodolfo Elizondo Torres

Rodolfo Elizondo Torres (born July 18, 1946) is a Mexican politician affiliated with the PAN.

Elizondo Torres was born in Durango, and holds a bachelor's degree in administration from the Monterrey Institute of Technology and Higher Education (ITESM).

== Political career ==
Elizondo has been a member of the PAN since the early 1980s. In 1983 he was elected municipal president (mayor) of Victoria de Durango. In 1986 and again in 1992 he unsuccessfully ran for Governor of Durango.

Elizondo has served in both houses of the Mexican Congress; from 1988 to 1991 and from 1994 to 1997 he served in the lower house, then from 1997 to 2000 he served in the Senate of Mexico during the LVII Legislature.

President Vicente Fox designated Elizondo first as presidential spokesperson and then, on July 29, 2003 as Secretary of Tourism.

Mexican President elect Felipe Calderón re-designated Elizondo as Secretary of Tourism for his Administration. He left this position in 2010.

In 2009 he was responsible for launching the "Welcome Back" campaign to regain the trust of travelers affected by the Swine Flu scare. He re-activated cruise ship arrivals to Mexican ports only one month after the swine flu threat became public.

Political offices
Preceded by Leticia Navarro Ochoa	Secretary of Tourism; 2003—2010	Succeeded by Gloria Guevara Manzo
Preceded by Eduardo de la Peña	Municipal president of Victoria de Durango; 1983—1986	Succeeded by Emilio Gutiérrez Valles
