= Mexico Tourism Board =

Mexican government agency

- Consejo de Promocion Turistica de Mexico

Agency overview
- Formed: 1999
- Dissolved: 2019
- Jurisdiction: Government of Mexico
- Headquarters: Mexico City, Mexico
- Parent agency: Secretariat of Tourism (SECTUR)

The Mexico Tourism Board (Spanish: Consejo de Promoción Turística de México (CPTM)) was a Mexican government agency responsible for promoting Mexico as an international tourism destination. Established in 1999, the organization coordinated national and international tourism marketing campaigns in collaboration with the Secretariat of Tourism (Secretaría de Turismo, SECTUR), state tourism authorities, and private‑sector stakeholders.

The agency operated until 2018, when it was dissolved as part of a restructuring of federal tourism promotion policy. Administrative liquidation continued into 2019. Following its closure, tourism promotion efforts became more decentralized and were increasingly carried out by regional tourism boards and private‑sector initiatives.

== History ==
=== Early tourism promotion efforts ===
Government involvement in tourism promotion in Mexico dates to the early twentieth century, when federal authorities began coordinating efforts to develop the tourism sector.

- In 1928, the Comisión Pro-Turismo (CPT) was established within the Ministry of the Interior to study and recommend measures for developing a national tourism industry.
- In 1929, the agency evolved into the Comisión Mixta Pro-Turismo, formalized through a presidential decree published in the Diario Oficial de la Federación.
- In 1933, a Department of Tourism was created within the Secretariat of National Economy, incorporating both public- and private-sector participation.
- In 1973, the National Trust Fund for Tourism Development (Fondo Nacional de Fomento al Turismo, FONATUR) was created to attract investment in tourism infrastructure.
- In 1975, the Secretariat of Tourism (Secretaría de Turismo, SECTUR) was established as the federal authority for tourism policy.
- Also in 1975, the first Acapulco International Hotel and Travel Agency Fair—later known as Tianguis Turístico—was held.

=== Establishment of the CPTM ===
The CPTM was established in October 1999 to consolidate national tourism promotion efforts. The organization worked in coordination with federal and state governments as well as private‑sector tourism stakeholders. Efforts included managing international marketing campaigns and coordinating promotional activities abroad. The agency maintained representation in key international markets and worked through Mexico’s diplomatic network, including embassies and consulates, to promote tourism to the country.

== Operations ==
During its operation, the CPTM maintained international offices and coordinated large‑scale marketing campaigns that promoted Mexico’s tourism destinations worldwide. The agency also developed initiatives to increase Mexico’s international visibility as a tourist destination. These efforts included initiatives such as the “Visit Mexico” branding campaign, the “Live it to Believe it” campaign, the "A World of Its Own" campaign, and participation in international meetings industry forums.

=== Meetings and conventions promotion ===
The CPTM maintained a specialized division focused on promoting Mexico as a destination for meetings, incentives, conferences, and exhibitions (MICE). The program worked with international industry organizations and event planners to attract major conventions and business events to Mexico and promote national industry events such as Tianguis Turístico. Prominent figures in the meetings industry included tourism executive Eduardo Chaillo, who played a key role in promoting Mexico’s meetings industry internationally, and Lourdes Berho, who focused on strategic marketing and increasing foreign tourist expenditure before the organization's closure.

=== Directors General ===
The Director General served as the chief executive of the CPTM and was responsible for implementing the organization’s national and international tourism promotion strategy in coordination with the Secretariat of Tourism.

Director General	Term	Notes
Javier Vega Camargo	1999–2002	First director following the creation of the CPTM.
Maria Elena Mancha	2002–2003	
Francisco J. Ortiz	2003–2005	
Magdalena Carral	2006–2006	
Francisco López Mena	2006–2007	Served an interim administrative role while the incoming government finalized its appointment.
Óscar Fitch Gómez	2007–2010	
Rodolfo López Negrete	2010–2016	Served under SECTUR secretaries Gloria Guevara, Claudia Ruiz Massieu, and Enrique de la Madrid.
Lourdes Berho	2016–2017	
Héctor Flores Santana	2017–2019	Oversaw administrative liquidation following the dissolution of the CPTM.

== Dissolution ==
In 2018, during the presidential transition following the election of Andrés Manuel López Obrador, the incoming administration announced plans to dissolve the CPTM as part of broader government restructuring and budget policy changes. The policy prompted debate among tourism industry stakeholders. Some supported the shift toward reduced public expenditure and greater private-sector involvement, while others expressed concern about the loss of a centralized national marketing strategy.

== Aftermath and legacy ==
Following the closure of the CPTM, tourism promotion activities in Mexico became more decentralized. Private‑sector organizations and regional tourism boards assumed greater responsibility for international marketing efforts.

Entities created or expanded after the dissolution included regional initiatives such as Fideicomiso de Turismo de Los Cabos (FIPROTUR) and the San Miguel de Allende Tourism Board. Private initiatives such as Visit Mexico USA also emerged to continue international promotion efforts associated with the former Visit Mexico campaign.

The Secretaría de Turismo (SECTUR) continues to serve as the primary federal authority responsible for tourism policy in Mexico. Certain international promotional activities have also been coordinated through the Ministry of Foreign Affairs (Secretaría de Relaciones Exteriores, SRE) via Mexico’s diplomatic missions abroad.
