= Survive! (film) =

- Directed by: René Cardona
- Screenplay by: René Cardona Jr.
- Based on: Survive! by Clay Blair
- Produced by: René Cardona; René Cardona Jr.
- Starring: Hugo Stiglitz; Luz María Aguilar
- Cinematography: Genaro Hurtado; Luis Medina
- Edited by: Marshall M. Borden; Alfredo Rosas Priego
- Music by: Gerald Fried; Raúl Lavista
- Production companies: Avant Films S.A. Corporación Nacional Cinematográfica (CONACINE); Productora Fílmica Real; Productora Fílmica G.M.
- Distributed by: Paramount Pictures (United States)
- Release date: January 15, 1976
- Running time: 111 minutes
- Country: Mexico
- Languages: Spanish; English

Survive! (Spanish: Supervivientes de los Andes – Andes Survivors) is a 1976 Mexican thriller film directed by René Cardona. The film was released in Mexico on January 15, 1976, based on Clay Blair's 1973 unauthorized paperback, Survive!, and is the first feature film to present the story of Uruguayan Air Force Flight 571. The English-language version of the film was substantially altered from the original.

== Premise ==
A Uruguayan rugby team crashes in the Andes Mountains and has to survive the extremely cold temperatures and rough climate. As some of the people die, the survivors are forced to make a terrible decision between starvation and cannibalism.

== Cast ==
- Hugo Stiglitz as Francisco
- Norma Lazareno as Silvia
- Luz María Aguilar as Mrs. Madero
- Fernando Larrañaga as Madero
- Pablo Ferrel as Raúl
- Leonardo Daniel as Carmelo
- Sara Guasch as Mamá de Silvia
- Gloria Chávez as Woman going to a wedding (as Gloria Chaves)
- José Elías Moreno as Rodrigo Fernández

== Reception ==
The New York Times gave a negative review for Survive!, calling it "an irksomely dubbed film of rudimentary exposition with a sometimes tinny musical accompaniment". Roger Ebert gave the film zero stars, saying, "In most movies featuring a lot of blood and cuts and close-ups of festering wounds and all that, the typical audience laughs to break the tension (horror movies almost always play as comedies). With Survive! though, the audience tends to be a little more sober, a little more thoughtful. Maybe that's because we realize that underlying this rather dumb, uninspired, even crude film is a true story of such compelling power that we're forced to think and respond."

Over the Labor Day weekend 1976, the film opened in Chicago and grossed $1.06 million from 63 theaters which propelled it to number one at the US box office.

== See also ==
- Alive (1993)
- Society of the Snow (2023)
- Cannibalism in popular culture
- List of Mexican films of 1976
