= Miguel Torruco Marqués =

Mexican politician

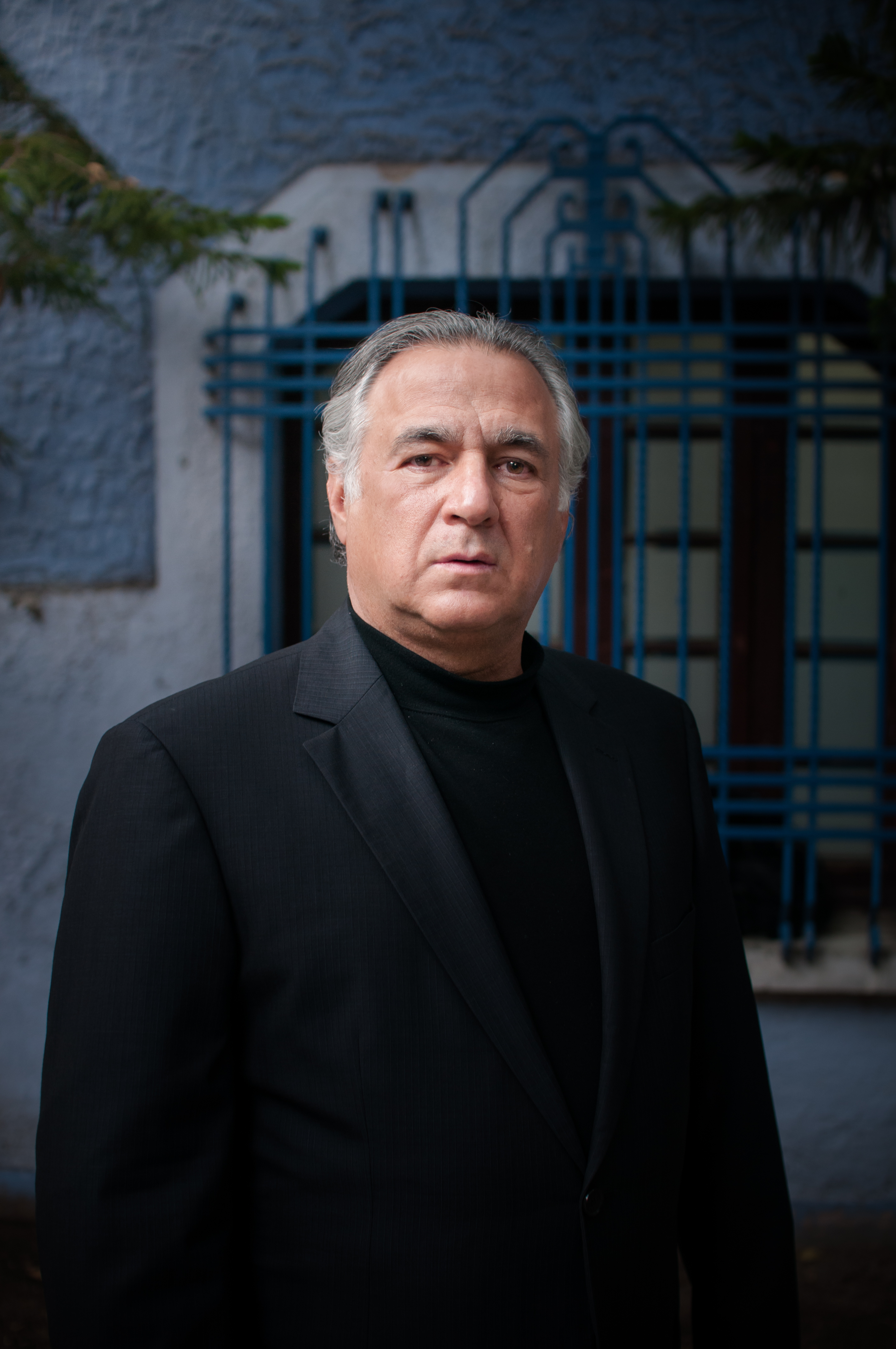
- Miguel Torruco Marqués

15th Secretary of Tourism
- In office 1 December 2018 – 30 September 2024
- President: Andrés Manuel López Obrador
- Preceded by: Enrique de la Madrid Cordero
- Succeeded by: Josefina Rodríguez Zamora

Personal details
- Born: September 19, 1951 (age 75) Mexico City
- Education: Cornell University
- Occupation: Secretary of Tourism of the Federal District
- Known for: entrepreneur, academic and Mexican public official

Miguel Torruco Marqués (born 19 September 1951) is an entrepreneur, academic and Mexican public official. He was the Secretary of Tourism of the Federal District from 2012 to 2017. In 2017, he became a Tourism Adviser of Andrés Manuel López Obrador, president of National Regeneration Movement (MORENA).

== Biography ==
He is the son of actress Maria Elena Marques and captain and actor Miguel Torruco. He studied hospitality at Cornell University; he specialized in Tourism Marketing at the American Center for Tourism Training (CICATUR) of the Organization of American States (OAS), and pursued graduate Top Management of Public Enterprises at the National Institute of Public Administration (INAP) and Teaching a higher level, given by the Ministry of Public Education (SEP). He holds a degree in hotel and restaurant management by the Mexican School of Tourism, which reached degree with the thesis titled "Mexican Association of Hotels and Motels as a fundamental tool for the consolidation of the sector." In academia he served as professor and deputy director of the Mexican School of Tourism. A short time later, at age 25, he founded his own school, the Pan American Hotel School (HBS), forming 17,000 tourism professionals in 38 years of institutional life.

As rector of the institution he established, among other achievements, degrees in Hospitality, Catering and Tourism Business Administration and the Graduate and Master in Hospitality Management with official recognition, for the first time in Latin America.

He became national president of the National Tourism Confederation (CNT), a coordinating body of tourism in Mexico, which groups 160 associations, unions, chambers, unions and organizations representing companies. Since 2012, he is the Secretary of Tourism of the Federal District, after the Mayor of Mexico City, Miguel Angel Mancera, invited him to lead this sector in the Mexican capital.

In turn, he is Chairman of the Technical Committee of the Joint Tourism Promotion Fund of the Federal District, Chairman of the Consultative Group on Training of Human Resources for Tourism of the City of Mexico and member of the Group of Experts of the World Tourism Organization (OMT).

== Books ==
He is the author of 9 books:

- Manual Hosting Technology I and II, 1976;
- ASA and its Link to Tourism, 1987;
- Tour 1987 services;
- Institutional History of Tourism in Mexico, 1926-1988, 1988;
- The Tourism Industry of Hope, 1990;
- Formation of Human Resources in Tourism (the case of Mexico), 2000;
- "The Association of Hotels and Motels, 90 years after its foundation (1922-2012)".

He has also written five diagnoses on tourism, highlighting "Formulation bases for the National Tourism Plan 1982-1988". In addition, he has lectured in 36 countries; and has received numerous awards throughout his 43 years of professional life.
