= Governor Valdez =

Governor Valdez or Valdes may refer to:

- Juan Valdez (governor) (fl. 1710s–20s), Governor of Texas and Coahuila in 1714 and 1716
- Mario López Valdez (born 1957), Governor of Sinaloa from 2011 to 2016
- Jerónimo Valdés (1784–1855), Governor of Cuba from 1841 to 1843
- Alfredo Valdés Montoya (1920–2014), Governor of Sinaloa from 1969 to 1974
- Rodolfo Félix Valdés (1922–2012), Governor of Sonora from 1985 to 1991
