= Cabinet of Flavio Romero de Velasco =

Cabinet of former Governor of Jalisco, Flavio Romero de Velasco

- Cabinet of State of Jalisco
- Date formed: 1 March 1977
- Date dissolved: 28 February 1983

People and organisations
- Governor: Flavio Romero de Velasco
- Governor's history: Former federal deputy for the 9th federal electoral district of Jalisco during the 49th Legislature (1973–1976)
- No. of ministers: 14
- Total no. of members: 20
- Member party: Institutional Revolutionary Party
- Status in legislature: Majority government (1977–1980); Majority government (1980–1983)

History
- Election: 5 December 1976 Jalisco state election
- Legislature terms: 48th Jalisco Legislature (01/02/1977-31/01/1980); 49th Jalisco Legislature (01/02/1980-31/01/1983)
- Advice and consent: Congress of the State of Jalisco
- Predecessor: Cabinet of Alberto Orozco Romero
- Successor: Cabinet of Enrique Álvarez del Castillo

Flavio Romero de Velasco assumed office as Governor of the State of Jalisco on 1 March 1977, and his term ended on 28 February 1983. The governor has the authority to nominate members of his Cabinet of the State of Jalisco, as per the Ley Orgánica del Poder Ejecutivo del Estado de Jalisco, Article 4, Section V.

== Cabinet ==
=== Cabinet officials on 1 March 1977 ===
Office	Holder	Political party
Secretaría General de Gobierno; General Secretariat of Government	Alfonso de Alba	PRI
Tesorería General del Estado General State Treasury	Raymundo Vázquez Villalobos	PRI
Departamento de Economía Department of Economics	José Luis Rodríguez Ortiz	PRI
Departamento de Educación Pública Department of Public Education	Ramón García Ruiz	PRI
Departamento de Obras Públicas Department of Public Works	Martín Navarrete Madrigal	PRI
Departamento de Tránsito Department of Traffic	José Manuel Pérez Luna	PRI
Departamento de Trabajo y Previsión Social Department of Labor and Social Prevision	Óscar Ibarra Rentería	PRI
Departamento de Agricultura y Ganadería Department of Agriculture and Cattle Raising	Enrique Vargas Pérez	PRI
Departamento de Turismo Department of Tourism	Juan Manuel Fernández de Castro	PRI
Procuraduría General de Justicia del Estado State General Attorney of Justice	Salvador Cárdenas Navarro	PRI
Departamento de Bellas Artes Department of Fine Arts	Alejandro Matos García	PRI
Junta General de Planeación y Urbanización del Estado General Board of Planning and Urbanization of the State	Juan Gil Elizondo	PRI
Subsecretaría de Gobierno Undersecretariat of Government	José Luis Leal Sanabria	PRI
Oficialía Mayor de la Secretaría General de Gobierno Administrative Office of the General Secretariat of Government	Haydée Eréndira Villalobos Rivera	PRI
Sistema para el Desarrollo Integral de la Familia (DIF) System for the Integral Development of the Family	María Yolanda Castillero del Saz	PRI
Proveeduría General del Estado General State Supply	Filiberto Ruvalcaba Sánchez	PRI
Dirección de Pensiones del Estado State Pensions Directorate	José Luis Peña Loza	Unaffiliated
Dirección de Relaciones Públicas Public Relations Department	Pedro Sánchez Ledezma	PRI
Dirección de Difusión y Publicidad Diffusion and Advertising Department	Héctor Torres Serratos	PRI
Secretario Particular Particular Secretary	Héctor Ixtláhuac Gaspar	PRI
