= Rosa Luz Alegría =

Mexican physicist

Rosa Luz Alegría Escamilla (born 1949) is a Mexican physicist who was the first woman to serve in the Mexican Executive Cabinet.

Alegría studied physics in the National Autonomous University of Mexico (UNAM). During her time at the university she got involved with UNAM's Consejo General de Huelga ("General Strike Council", CGH).

During Luis Echeverría's presidency she started to work in the public service. President José López Portillo appointed her under-secretary of planning and budget (Subsecretaria de Programación y Presupuesto), and later, on August 13, 1980, she was appointed Secretary of Tourism, becoming the first female Secretary of State in Mexico.

Alegria's appointment as Secretary of State occurred in an administration famous for nepotism.

Political offices
Preceded by Guillermo Rossell de la Lama	Secretary of Tourism; 1980–1982	Succeeded by Antonio Enríquez Savignac
