= Antonio Enríquez Savignac =

Mexican politician

Antonio Enríquez Savignac (born August 17, 1931 in Mexico City–d. February, 2007) was a Mexican politician who served as Secretary of Tourism in the cabinet of President Miguel de la Madrid and as Secretary-General of the United Nations World Tourism Organization (UNWTO).

== Education ==
Enríquez Savignac held a bachelor's degree in administration from the University of Ottawa and a Master of Business Administration from Harvard University.

== Career ==
From 1960 to 1963 Enríquez Savignac served in the Inter-American Development Bank. In 1963 he went back to Mexico to work in the central bank as advisor to the General Director. In 1969 he created the Fondo Nacional de Fomento al Turismo (FONATUR), the main Mexican office in charge of the tourism development and promotion; he served as Director of the FONATUR.

In 1982 President Miguel de la Madrid designated him as Secretary of Tourism; he left that position in 1988.

From 1990 to 1996 he served as Secretary-General of the United Nations World Tourism Organization (UNWTO).

Preceded by Rosa Luz Alegría	Secretary of Tourism; 1982–1988	Succeeded by Carlos Hank González
Preceded by Willibald Pahr	Secretary-General of the UNWTO; 1990–1996	Succeeded by Francesco Frangialli
