= Nuevo León Institute of Technology =

Higher education institute in Guadalupe, Nuevo Léon, Mexico

Coordinates: 25.6664°N 100.2447°W

- Instituto Tecnológico de Nuevo León
- Motto: En búsqueda de la excelencia, con el fortalecimiento académico
- Type: Public
- Established: 1 October 1976
- Affiliations: ANUIES
- Rector: Mario Valdés Garza
- Academic staff: 188
- Students: 1,734
- Undergraduates: 1,734
- Location: Guadalupe, Nuevo León, Mexico
- Colors: Dark Red and White
- Website: www.itnl.edu.mx

Nuevo León Institute of Technology (Spanish: Instituto Tecnológico de Nuevo León) or ITNL is an institution of higher education in Guadalupe, Nuevo Léon, Mexico. This school was founded in 1976 in Apodaca, but later was moved to Monterrey and finally to Guadalupe.

The ITNL offers 4 bachelor's degrees and 1 master's degree in mechatronic.
