= Monterrey College of Music and Dance =

Coordinates: 25.6726°N 100.3400°W

Escuela Superior de Música y Danza de Monterrey
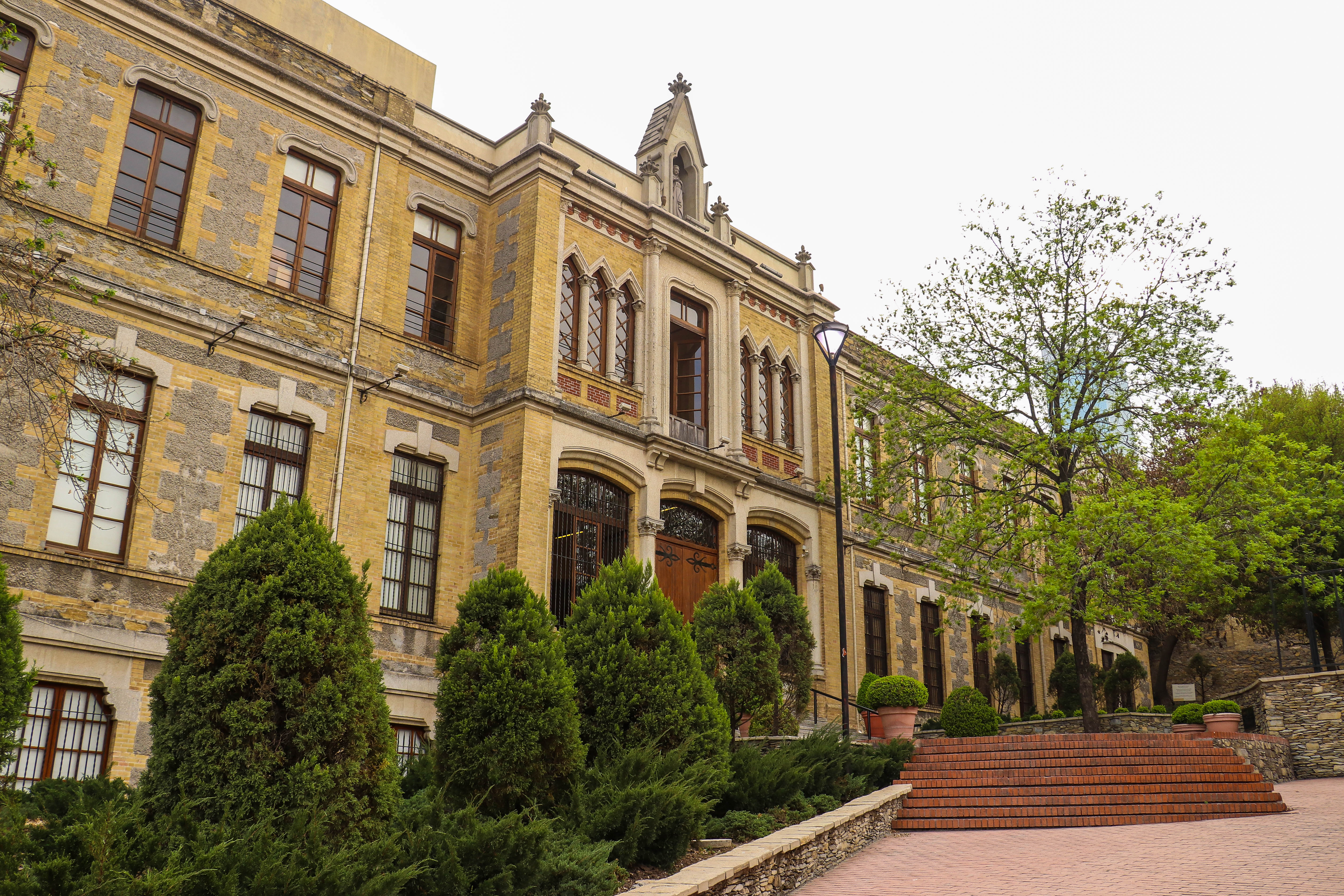
- Type: Public
- Established: 1977
- Principal: Jaime Javier Sierra Garza
- Administrative staff: 120
- Students: 560
- Location: Monterrey, Mexico
- Campus: Urban

The Monterrey College of Music and Dance (Escuela Superior de Música y Danza de Monterrey in Spanish) is a public music college in Monterrey, Mexico.

== Studies ==
The School offers bachelor degrees in Music and dance.

== Facilities ==
The school's campus is in central Monterrey, in the area known as Obispado. It occupies a large building with several large recital and rehearsal rooms, as well as library, teaching studios and practice rooms.

== See also ==
- Monterrey
