= Josefina Rodríguez Zamora =

Mexican politician (born 1989)

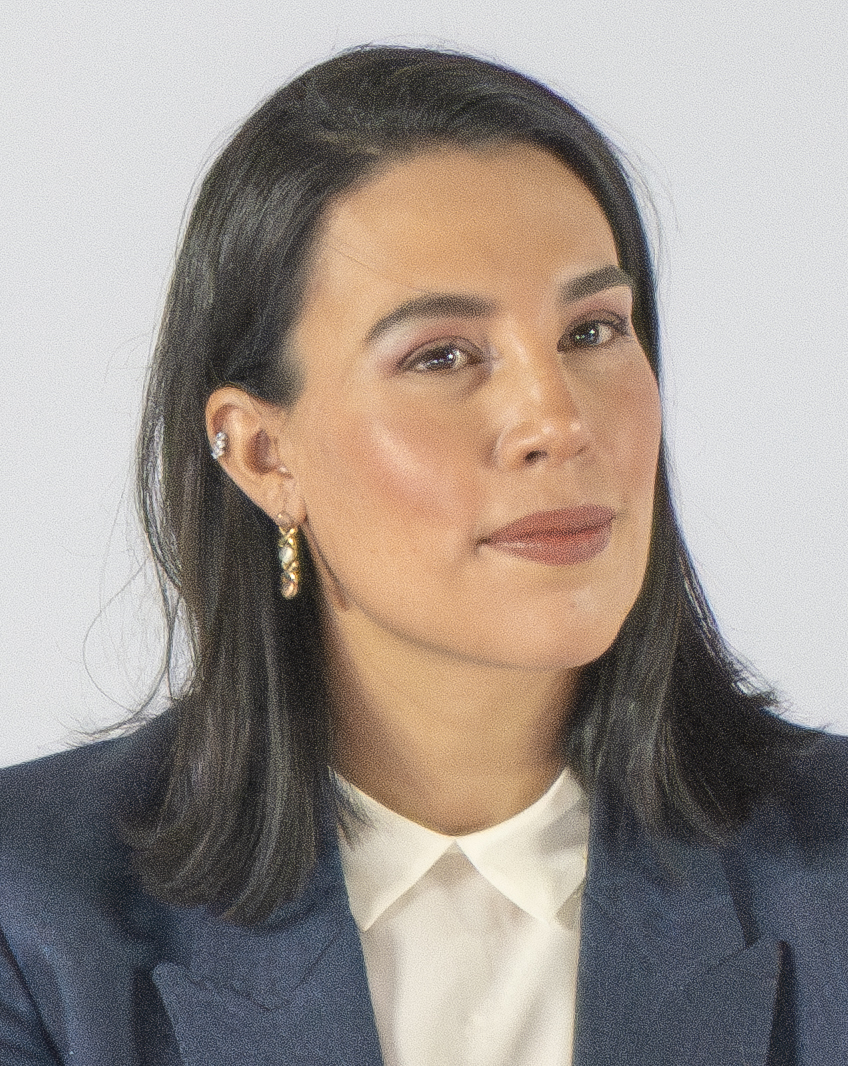
- Rodríguez Zamora in 2024

Secretary of Tourism
- Incumbent
- Assumed office 1 October 2024
- President: Claudia Sheinbaum
- Preceded by: Miguel Torruco Marqués

Personal details
- Born: 3 March 1989 (age 37)
- Party: Morena (since 2021)

Josefina Rodríguez Zamora (born 3 March 1989) is a Mexican politician serving as secretary of tourism since 2024. From 2021 to 2024, she served as secretary of tourism of Tlaxcala.
