= Mario Trujillo García =

Mexican politician

Governor of Tabasco
- In office 1 January 1971 – 31 December 1976
- Preceded by: Manuel R. Mora Martínez
- Succeeded by: Leandro Rovirosa Wade

Member of the Chamber of Deputies for Tabasco's 1st district
- In office 1 September 1967 – 31 August 1970
- Preceded by: Manuel Gurría Ordóñez
- Succeeded by: Manuel Piñera Morales

Personal details
- Born: 18 January 1905 Villahermosa, Tabasco, Mexico
- Died: 10 January 2007 (aged 86) Mexico City, D.F., Mexico
- Party: PRI
- Occupation: Politician

Mario Trujillo García (Note: In this Mexican name, the surname is Trujillo and the second or maternal family name is García.) (21 January 1920 – 10 January 2007) was a Mexican politician from the Institutional Revolutionary Party (PRI).

Trujillo was elected to the Chamber of Deputies for Tabasco's 1st congressional district in 1967. In 1971, after his election in 1970, he took office as governor of Tabasco (1971–1977).

== Personal life ==
He was survived by his two daughters, Georgina Trujillo and Graciela Trujillo.

| Preceded by Manuel R. Mora Martínez | Governor of Tabasco; 1971–1976 | Succeeded by Leandro Rovirosa Wade |
