= Gloria Guevara =

Mexican politician

Gloria Rebeca Guevara Manzo
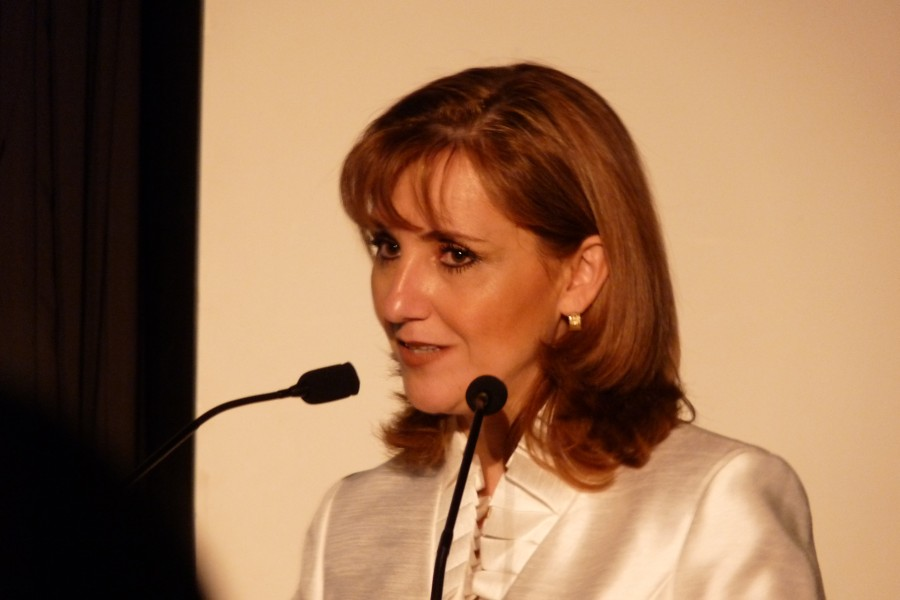

Mexican Secretary of Tourism
- In office March 10, 2010 – November 30, 2012
- President: Felipe Calderón
- Preceded by: Rodolfo Elizondo Torres
- Succeeded by: Claudia Ruiz Massieu

Personal details
- Born: September 1, 1957 (age 69) Guadalajara Jalisco Mexico
- Citizenship: Mexico
- Party: Independent
- Spouse: Alejandro del Arenal
- Children: Kayla and Alan
- Parent(s): Gustavo Guevara Martinez and Gloria Elizabeth Manzo
- Education: Kellogg School of Management Northwestern University and Anahuac University
- Profession: Computer Science, Travel and Tourism

Gloria Guevara Manzo (born September 1, 1967) is a business executive and stateswoman. She was Secretary of Tourism for Mexico from March 10, 2010 to November 30, 2012.

== Biography ==
Guevara was born in Guadalajara Jalisco, Mexico. She holds a Bachelor of Science in Computer Science from Anahuac University and an MBA from the Kellogg School of Management at Northwestern University. She has studied Marketing, General Management, Project Management, Leadership and other subjects at IPADE, George Washington University and other schools.

== Career ==
Guevara began her professional career at NCR Corporation in 1989 and worked in the IT industry in various roles, working for North America, Latin America, the Middle East and Africa regions.

Since 1995, Guevara has specialized in the travel industry, working for Sabre Travel Network and Sabre Holdings. She then joined Coral Gables Florida, where she initially had regional responsibilities and worked for the Latin America and the Caribbean region, subsequently held global responsibilities as vice president for Customer Solutions and Vendor Management in the Information Office in the Sabre headquarter in Southlake Texas.

Guevara was also the CEO of Sabre de Mexico, a joint venture between Aeromexico, Mexicana and Sabre holdings, where she was reporting to the board of directors.

Guevara was also special advisor on Government affairs in the Harvard T.H. Chan School of Public Health. She is also part of the Future of Travel and Tourism Global Agenda Council of the World Economic Forum, and the World Tourism Think Tank. In 2019, she introduced the Crisis Readiness Report, which outlined best practices and policy recommendations to help the sector navigate the COVID-19 crisis —the worst in its history—and to reduce the impact of future global disruptions. She currently serves on the Board of Arsenale. She has previously served on the boards of the Saudi Tourism Authority (STA), AMEX GBT, HSBC Mexico, Playa Hotels & Resorts, CTS, and Palace Group.

On February 10, 2025, Mexico officially nominated Guevara as a candidate for the position of Secretary-General of the United Nations World Tourism Organization (UNWTO) for the 2026–2029 term. Her candidacy has received the endorsement of the World Travel & Tourism Council (WTTC). If elected, she would become the first woman to lead the UN's specialized agency responsible for promoting sustainable and inclusive tourism globally.

=== Cabinet position ===
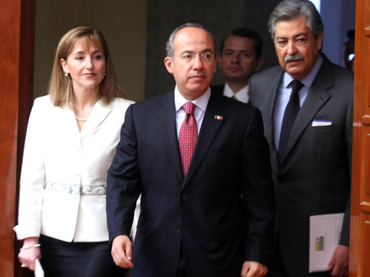
President Felipe Calderon in the center, Secretary Guevara left and Secretary Elizondo right

On March 10 of 2010, President Felipe Calderon appointed Gloria as the Secretary of Tourism. Two weeks after her appointment, she was also responsible for overseeing the Mexico Tourism Board.

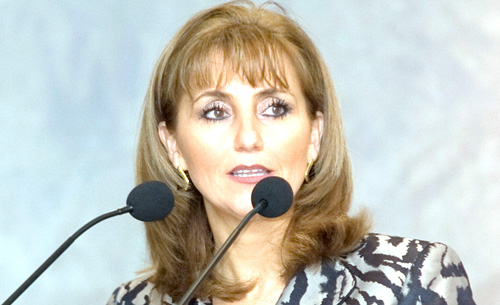
Secretary Guevara speaking during Travel Summit

During her time in government, Mexico faced the accumulated impact of the 2008 financial crisis and the H1N1 flu.

Guevara was instrumental in launching the Global Entry program in Mexico with US Ambassador Wayne. In November 2011, Mexico became the first country in the world to take part in this expedited customs and border control initiative, facilitating the movement of Mexicans visiting the US.

Guevara turned around a period marked by complex challenges, including the H1N1 pandemic, 2008 financial crisis, and domestic security concerns, changing international perceptions and repositioning Mexico as a top travel destination. In the context of Mexico's presidency of the G20, she advocated for the inclusion of tourism in the G20 Leaders' Declaration, a milestone achieved at the Los Cabos Summit. It marked the first time tourism was formally recognized within the G20 policy framework, and industry organizations subsequently gave her the recognition of G20 champion for the sector and acknowledged her as a representative in multilateral discussions.

Guevara played a key role in the launch of the Global Entry program in Mexico, making Mexico the first country in the world to implement this expedited customs and border control initiative. Guevara relaunched and expanded the Pueblos Mágicos (Magical Towns) program, designed to highlight towns with high cultural, natural and historical assets. This resulted in attracting more global tourists and served in the strategy to empower communities and develop tourism products. The initiative also had an effective local impact as it promoted and supported regional tourism development across the country.

As Mexico's Secretary of Tourism, Guevara received the Good Neighbor Award from the U.S.-Mexico Chamber of Commerce in recognition of her work in strengthening Mexico's tourism presence internationally. Also, during her time in office, Virtuoso, a global luxury travel network, named Mexico's Tourism Board as the best performing in destination marketing. CNN, Forbes, and Expansion also recognized Guevara as one of the most influential women in Mexico.

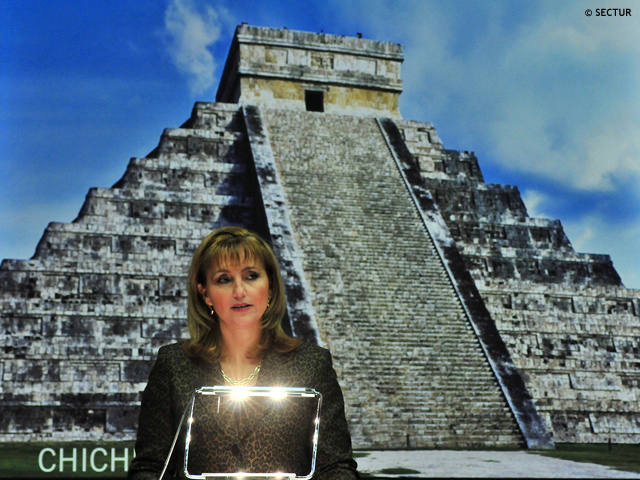
Secretary Guevara presenting Maya Route in Fitur 2012

=== G20 and T20 ===
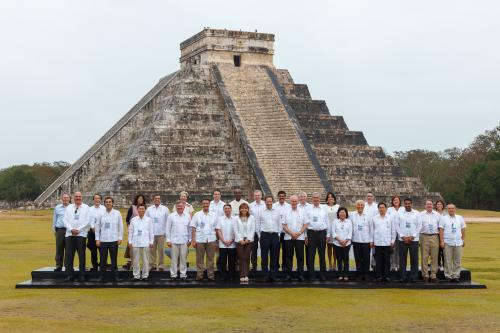
Ministers of Tourism, leaders, Secretary General UNWTO, WTTC during T20 in Mexico

During the T20 in Mérida in 2011, all leaders of Tourism from the G20 economies, UNWTO, WTTC, WEF, IATA and leaders gathered to discuss the impact in Tourism and the creation of jobs due to Travel Facilitation.

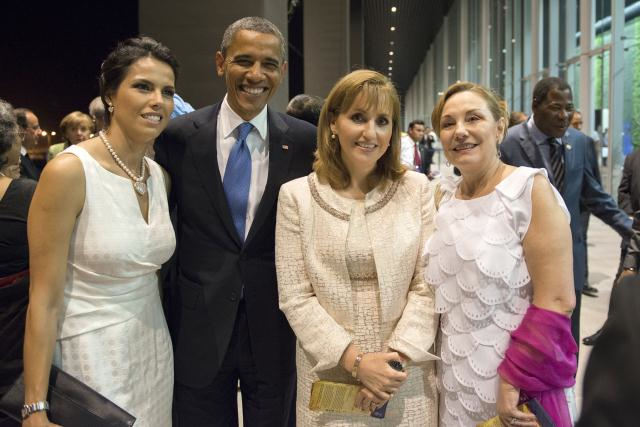
President Barack Obama and Secretary of Tourism of Mexico Gloria Guevara with first lady of Chile to the right and first lady of BCS to the left

During her tenure, the travel and tourism sector was included in the G20 Leaders' Declaration in Mexico. For her work at G20, Guevara was invited to speak at the House of Commons in London during the dinner offered by PATA .

Throughout her career, Guevara has worked closely with global leaders, including U.S. President Barack Obama, who attended the WTTC Global Summit in Cancun and participated in the G20 Summit in Los Cabos.

=== World Travel & Tourism Council (WTTC) ===
On August 15, 2017, Guevara became President and CEO of the World Travel & Tourism Council (WTTC), representing the global private sector in travel and tourism. She made history as the first woman and first Latina to lead the WTTC in this role. During her tenure, the organization introduced a range of initiatives to support the sector's development and address long-term sustainability goals.

While at WTTC, Guevara created initiatives focused on sustainable tourism, seamless travel, and crisis preparedness. These initiatives aimed to strengthen collaboration between the public and private sectors across the global travel industry.

Guevara also led the sector’s environmental and climate agenda. As part of these efforts, the WTTC established partnerships with international organizations, including the United Nations Framework Convention on Climate Change (UNFCCC) and the United Nations Environment Program (UNEP). She presided over the Council’s first global forum dedicated to environmental and climate-related issues in tourism.

Under her leadership, the WTTC's annual Global Summit grew in significance and further established the organization as the global voice for the travel and tourism private sector. In 2018, the summit took place in Buenos Aires, Argentina, coinciding with the G20 Tourism Ministerial meeting. The 2019 summit, held in Seville, gained considerable visibility and featured high-profile speakers included speakers such as U.S. President Barack Obama, Mexican President Felipe Calderón, Spanish Prime Minister Pedro Sánchez, and other international figures.

In 2021, the WTTC hosted its Global Summit in Cancun, the first major international tourism events held following the outbreak of the COVID-19 pandemic. The event was conducted under strict public health protocols.

In response to the pandemic, Guevara led the development of the Safe Travels Protocols global health and safety guidelines that enabled the reopening of the tourism sector. These protocols were adopted by more than 400 destinations worldwide, providing a framework for safe travel and helping to restore confidence in the industry. For the first time, health and safety protocols were developed by the private sector and implemented broadly through the Safe Travels stamp, which offered certainty to travelers and facilitated a swifter recovery. These efforts were supported by webinars, task forces, and government engagement, including participation in the G20. Despite their significance, many of these contributions were not prominently highlighted in official records.

Beyond crisis response, Guevara played a critical role in uniting and aligning more than 200 private sector executives and over 150 governments to support policy alignment.

=== Ministry of Tourism, Saudi Arabia (2021–2024) ===
Guevara was chief special advisor to the Ministry of Tourism of Saudi Arabia. She worked towards the realization of Vision 2030 tourism goals, which were achieved seven years ahead of schedule when Saudi Arabia reported over 100 million tourists by December 2023.

Guevara organized and hosted a WTTC Global Summit in Riyadh in November 2022.

Guevara set up the Sustainable Tourism Global Center (STGC) initiative, a multi-country, multi-stakeholder initiative announced by Crown Prince HRH Mohammed Bin Salman during the Saudi Green Initiative in October 2021 and led by the Minister of Tourism.
