= Gerardo Alcántara =

Mexican footballer and manager (born 1980)

Personal information
- Full name: Gerardo Alcántara Martín
- Date of birth: 4 February 1980 (age 46)
- Place of birth: Mexico City, Mexico
- Height: 1.79 m (5 ft 10 in)
- Position: Defender

Team information
- Current team: UNAM U–16 (Manager)

Senior career*
Years	Team	Apps	(Gls)
2004	Altamira	12	(0)
2005–2008	UNAM	1	(0)
2006–2008	→ Pumas Morelos (loan)	32	(1)
2008–09	Lobos BUAP	21	(1)

Managerial career
- 2015: Monterrey U–17 (Assistant)
- 2015–2017: Monterrey U–15
- 2017: Monterrey Premier (Interim)
- 2017–2019: Monterrey U–15
- 2019: Monterrey TDP
- 2019: UNAM U–17 (Assistant)
- 2019–2020: UNAM TDP
- 2020: UNAM U–17 (Interim)
- 2020: Pumas Tabasco (Assistant)
- 2021: UNAM U–17 (Assistant)
- 2021: UNAM U–18
- 2022–: UNAM U–16
- * Club domestic league appearances and goals as of 16:49 UTC, 23 September 2022

Gerardo Alcántara Martín (born February 4, 1980) is a Mexican football manager and former player. He was born in Coyoacán, Mexico City.
