= Francisco José Madero González =

Mexican politician (1930–2013)

Governor of Coahuila
- In office 12 August 1981 – 30 November 1981
- Preceded by: Oscar Flores Tapia
- Succeeded by: José de las Fuentes Rodríguez

Senator for Coahuila
- In office 1 September 1982 – 31 August 1988

Member of the Chamber of Deputies for Coahuila's 6th district
- In office 1 December 1981 – 31 August 1982
- Preceded by: Alfonso Hernández Hernández
- Succeeded by: Enrique Agüero Ávalos
- In office 1 September 1979 – 13 August 1981
- Succeeded by: Alfonso Hernández Hernández

Municipal President of Torreón
- In office 1976–1978
- Preceded by: José Solís Amaro
- Succeeded by: Homero del Bosque Villarreal

Personal details
- Born: October 16, 1930 San Antonio, Texas, U.S.
- Died: February 21, 2013 (aged 82) Torreón, Coahuila, Mexico
- Party: Institutional Revolutionary Party
- Spouse: María Luisa Fernández del Castillo
- Children: Francisco José; Miguel Agustín Segundo; Jorge Raúl; María Luisa; Bernardo; Ignacio; Rodolfo

Francisco José Madero González (October 16, 1930 – February 21, 2013) was a Mexican politician, accountant, and member of the Institutional Revolutionary Party (PRI). Madero served as the 54th municipal president, or mayor, of Torreón from 1976 to 1978 and the governor of the state of Coahuila in 1981.

== Biography ==
=== Personal life ===
Madero was born in San Antonio, Texas, in the United States on October 16, 1930, and raised in Parras de la Fuente, Coahuila. He was the seventh child of General Raúl Madero and Dora González Sada. His parents had fled to the United States after the Mexican Revolution. His paternal uncle, Francisco I. Madero, served as the President of Mexico from 1911 to 1913.

Francisco José Madero married María Luisa Fernández del Castillo, in 1953. The couple had seven children: Francisco José, Miguel Agustín Segundo, Jorge Raúl, María Luisa, Bernardo, Ignacio, and Rodolfo.

=== Political career ===
Madero began his career as an accountant.

Madero was the chairman of the local Institutional Revolutionary Party's Torreón municipal committee from 1962 to 1963. He next served as the head of the state Public Registry of Property from October 1963 until September 1975.

Madero served as the 54th Municipal President (mayor) of Torreón from 1976 to 1978. He was elected as a federal deputy of the Chamber of Deputies representing Coahuila's 6th district, serving in the 51st Congress from September 1, 1979, until August 1, 1982. He took a leave of absence from the Chamber of Deputies in 1981 to become interim Governor of Coahuila following the resignation of his predecessor, former governor Oscar Flores Tapia. He served as the governor of Coahuila for a brief tenure from August 11, 1981, until November 30, 1981. Madero was later elected to the Senate of the Republic for the 52nd and 53rd sessions of Congress. His last public office was as the head of the Jefe del Departamento de Promociones Social de Infonavit from 1991 to 1993.

He became the director of the General del Instituto Coahuilense para las Personas Adultas Mayores in 2002.

=== Death ===
On February 16, 2013, Francisco José Madero González was found unconscious in his bedroom at 8 AM by one of his servants. Madero was immediately taken to the hospital, where he spent five nights.

Madero's death was confirmed by Coahuila Governor Rubén Moreira Valdez, via Twitter on Thursday at 1 PM. His funeral was held the following evening at 4 PM; he died from pneumonia at the age of 82.
