= Carlos Jonguitud Barrios =

Mexican politician

Carlos Jongitud Barrios (November 4, 1924 – November 22, 2011) was a controversial Mexican union leader and governor of San Luis Potosí (1979–1985). For decades he was generally portrayed by the Mexican press as a gangsterish, de facto leader of the national teachers' union (in Spanish: Sindicato Nacional de Trabajadores de la Educación, SNTE).

Jongitud Barrios was born at Coxcatlán, San Luis Potosí, the son of Atanasio Jongitud Álvarez, a farmer. His mother was an elementary school teacher. He graduated as an elementary school teacher from the Escuela Normal in Ozuluama, Veracruz, and received a bachelor's degree in law from the National Autonomous University of Mexico.

Jongitud joined the Revolutionary Institutional Party (PRI) in 1942, representing it twice in the Senate and once in the Chamber of Deputies. He also served as general director of the Institute for Social Security and Services for State Workers (ISSSTE) from 1976 until 1979.
