= Griselda Álvarez =

Mexican politician (1913–2009)

Governor of Colima
- In office 1 November 1979 – 31 October 1985
- Preceded by: Arturo Noriega Pizano
- Succeeded by: Elías Zamora Verduzco

Senator for Jalisco
- In office 1 September 1976 – 31 August 1979

Personal details
- Born: 5 April 1913 Guadalajara, Jalisco, Mexico
- Died: 26 March 2009 (aged 95) Mexico City, Mexico
- Party: Institutional Revolutionary Party
- Education: National Autonomous University of Mexico
- Profession: Teacher, writer, politician

Griselda Álvarez Ponce de León (Note: In this Mexican name, the surname is Álvarez and the second or maternal family name is Ponce de León.) (5 April 1913 – 26 March 2009) was the first female governor in Mexico. Álvarez was Governor of the state of Colima from 1979 to 1985.

== Biography ==
She was born in Guadalajara, Jalisco, capital of Colima's northern neighbor, where her family lived after the most violent eruption in modern history of the Volcano of Fire in Colima. The eruption began 20 January 1913 and continued for four days. She was born into one of the most important families in Colima. Her parents were Miguel Álvarez García and María Dolores Guadalupe Eugenia Ponce de León.

Her father at the time of her birth was a soldier in the Army, but later was governor of Colima from 1919 until 1923. Her great-grandfather, General Manuel Álvarez Zamora, a delegate in the Constituent Congress, was designated the highest political figure in the territory of Colima in 1826. In 1857 when Colima became a state, he became its first governor.

She died in Mexico City on 26 March 2009, aged 95.

== Writing career ==
Griselda Álvarez studied at the National Autonomous University of Mexico (UNAM) and received her degree in writing and composition. She then began her work as a poet and writer.

Her works include:

- Cementerio de pájaros, 1956
- Dos cantos, 1959
- Desierta compañía, 1961
- Letanía erótica para la paz, 1963
- La sombra niña, 1965
- Anatomía superficial, 1967
- Estación sin nombre, 1972

While composing her works, she was also working as a teacher, but eventually she entered public service. While she did not abandon her work as a teacher, she took a post in the public sector working under the secretary of education, and moved into the realm of social work eventually becoming the director of volunteer services in the federal social security institute.

== Public office ==
Álvarez left to serve as Senator from the state of Jalisco from 1976 to 1979, then as Governor of Colima from 1979 to 1985, making her the first female governor of Mexico. Her goal as governor was "educar para progresar" (Educate for progress) While she worked hard for progress as governor, her work did not end there. She went on to found various organizations such as the Center of Attention to Women, The Mexican Women's Alliance, and The Mexican Association of Social Wellbeing. She also served her political party, the PRI, as a member of the Caucus on National Ideology in 1978 and 1994 and the National Commission of Honor and Justice of the National Executive Committee in 1994 as well as various other committees and consult groups.

== Awards and recognition ==
Álvarez received various awards and recognitions, including the Senate's Belisario Domínguez Medal in 1996, and the Gold Medal of Fine Arts at the National Palace of Fine Arts in Mexico City on 8 April 2008. However, due to poor health and her age, the award was accepted by her son, Miguel Delgado Álvarez. She had been bed-ridden for a year, but in very stable condition as her son was quoted as saying she had been out of the hospital for more than a year and that her vital signs were all normal.
