= Leandro Rovirosa Wade =

Mexican politician

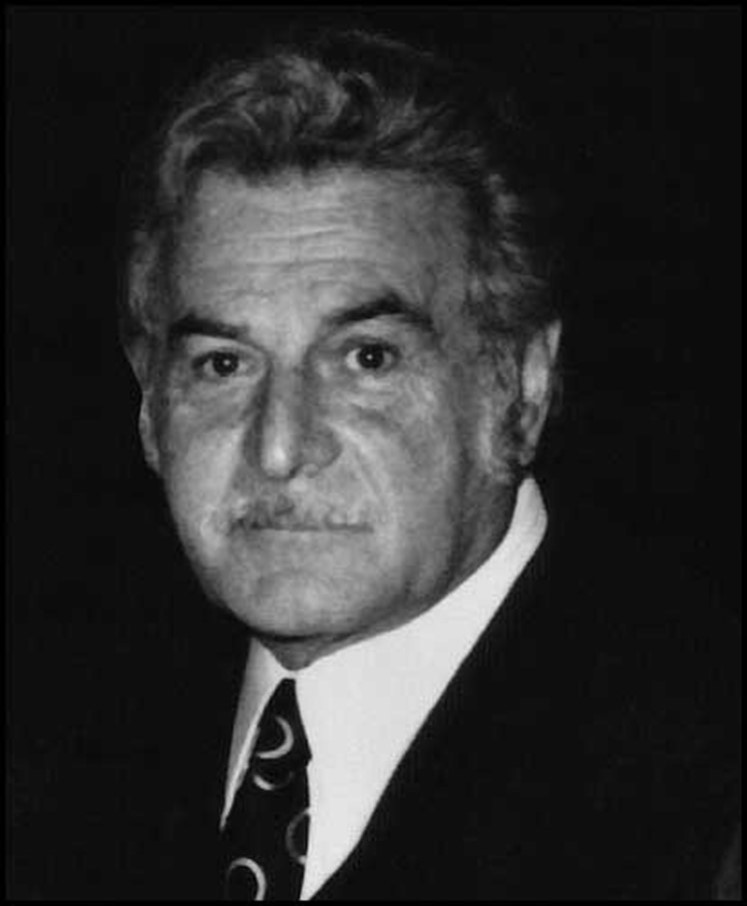

Governor of Tabasco
- In office 1 January 1977 – 31 December 1982
- Preceded by: Mario Trujillo García
- Succeeded by: Enrique González Pedrero

Personal details
- Born: 26 February 1918 Villahermosa, Tabasco, Mexico
- Died: 6 April 2014 (aged 96) Mexico City, Mexico
- Party: PRI
- Spouse: Celia González de Rovirosa

Leandro Rovirosa Wade (26 February 1918 – 6 April 2014) was a Mexican politician affiliated with the Institutional Revolutionary Party (PRI) who served as Governor of Tabasco during the 1977–82 period. He previously served as Secretary of Water Resources during the government of Luis Echeverría.

Preceded by José Hernández Terán	Secretary of Water Resources; 1970 — 1976	Succeeded by Luis Robles Linares

Preceded by Mario Trujillo García	Governor of Tabasco; 1977 — 1982	Succeeded by Enrique González Pedrero
