= Luis H. Ducoing Gamba =

Mexican politician (1937–2024)

Luis Humberto Ducoing Gamba
- Official portrait

Governor of Guanajuato
- In office 26 September 1973 – 25 September 1979
- Preceded by: Manuel M. Moreno
- Succeeded by: Enrique Velasco Ibarra

Federal deputy for Guanajuato's 9th district
- In office 1970–1973

Federal deputy for Guanajuato's 6th district
- In office 1964–1967

Personal details
- Born: 12 May 1937 San Luis de la Paz, Guanajuato, Mexico
- Died: 24 March 2024 (aged 86) Querétaro, Querétaro, Mexico
- Party: Institutional Revolutionary Party
- Spouse: Marta Alicia Nieto Garza (died 2018)
- Parent(s): Luis Ducoing; Rebeca Gamba
- Education: Universidad de Guanajuato
- Profession: Lawyer

Luis Humberto Ducoing Gamba (12 May 1937 – 24 March 2024) was a Mexican politician. He served as the governor of Guanajuato from 1973 to 1979. He also served as a federal deputy from 1964 to 1967 and from 1970 to 1973.

== Early life and education ==
Son of Luis Ducoing and Rebeca Gamba, Ducoing was born in San Luis de la Paz, Guanajuato, on 12 May 1937. Ducoing attended the Universidad de Guanajuato, graduating in 1960.

== Career ==
A member of the Institutional Revolutionary Party (PRI), Ducoing was elected a federal deputy in 1964 for Guanajuato's 6th district, where he served until 1967. He served again from 1970 to 1973, for Guanajuato's 9th district. Ducoing served as the governor of Guanajuato from 26 September 1973 to 25 September 1979.

== Personal life and death ==
Predeceased by his wife Marta Alicia Nieto Garza in 2018, Ducoing died in the city of Querétaro on 24 March 2024, aged 86.

== See also ==
- Category:Governors of Guanajuato
