= Jesús Martínez Ross =

Mexican politician (1934–2025)

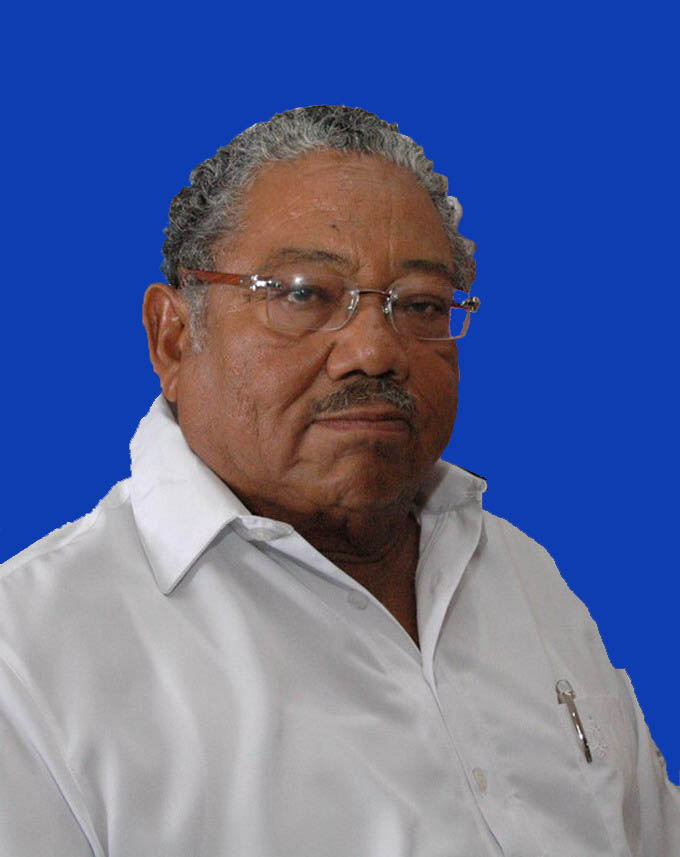

Governor of Quintana Roo
- In office 5 April 1975 – 4 April 1981
- Preceded by: David Gustavo Gutiérrez (Governor of the Federal Territory)
- Succeeded by: Pedro Joaquín Coldwell

Personal details
- Born: 7 May 1934; Chetumal, Quintana Roo, Mexico
- Died: 14 September 2025 (aged 91); Chetumal, Quintana Roo, Mexico
- Political party: PRI
- Spouse: Alicia Márquez Aguirre (d. 12 June 2020)
- Profession: Politician, economist

Jesús Martínez Ross (Note: In this Spanish name, the first or paternal surname is Martínez and the second or maternal family name is Ross.) (7 May 1934 – 14 September 2025) was a Mexican politician belonging to the Institutional Revolutionary Party (PRI). He was a native of Chetumal, Quintana Roo.

From 1973 to 1975, he held a seat in the Chamber of Deputies, representing Quintana Roo's sole district. In 1975 he contended to serve as the first elected governor of Quintana Roo following statehood, defeating his sole opponent, Antonio Miselem Asfura of the Popular Socialist Party (PPS) by a margin of 41,165 votes to 443. He subsequently served as governor from 1975 to 1981.

Martínez Ross died on 14 September 2025 in Chetumal, Quintana Roo, at the age of 91.

Preceded by David Gustavo Gutiérrez (as Governor of the Federal Territory of Quintana Roo)	Governor of Quintana Roo; 5 April 1975 to 4 April 1981	Succeeded by Pedro Joaquín Coldwell
