= Flavio Romero de Velasco =

Mexican politician and lawyer (1925–2016)

Governor of Jalisco
- In office 1 March 1977 – 28 February 1983
- Preceded by: Alberto Orozco Romero
- Succeeded by: Enrique Álvarez del Castillo

Member of the Chamber of Deputies
- In office 1 September 1973 – 31 August 1976
- Constituency: Jalisco 9
- In office 1 September 1961 – 31 August 1964
- Constituency: Jalisco 3
- In office 1 September 1955 – 31 August 1958
- Constituency: Jalisco 8

President of the Chamber of Deputies
- In office 1 September 1955 – 30 September 1955

Personal details
- Born: Flavio Romero de Velasco; 22 December 1925 Ameca, Jalisco, Mexico
- Died: 2 July 2016 (aged 90)
- Party: Institutional Revolutionary Party
- Education: National Autonomous University of Mexico

Flavio Romero de Velasco (22 December 1925 – 2 July 2016) was a Mexican politician and lawyer. He held the office of Governor of Jalisco, one of Mexico's most important states, from March 1977 until February 1983. Prior to becoming governor, Romero served as a deputy in the federal Chamber of Deputies for three separate tenures.

Romero was born and raised in the city of Ameca, Jalisco. He earned his law degree from the National Autonomous University of Mexico (UNAM), where he also received a degree in philosophy.

He served in the federal Chamber of Deputies for three terms: 1955–1958 for the VIII Federal Electoral District of Jalisco; 1961–1964 for the III Federal District of Jalisco in the XLV Legislature; and 1973–1976 for the IX Federal Electoral District of Jalisco in the XLIX Legislature. He was the President of the Chamber of Deputies in 1955. He also worked as an aide and advisor during the 1958 presidential campaign of Adolfo López Mateos. He became a customs administrator in the northern, border city of Ciudad Juarez, Chihuahua.

Romero, a member of the ruling Institutional Revolutionary Party (PRI), held the position of Governor of Jalisco from 1977 to 1983. Romero was inaugurated on March 1, 1977. One of Governor Romero's first priorities was a crack down on left-wing guerillas, who were active in Jalisco during the 1970s.

Under Romero, the state government launched Sistecozome, the bus public transportation system for the city of Guadalajara in 1982. Romero also renovated much of Guadalajara's city center, which culminated with the construction and opening of the city's large Plaza Tapatia, also in 1982, although such process involved the demolition of most of the historical buildings from the Spanish colonial epoch.

On January 23, 1998, Romero was arrested and charged with aiding drug trafficking. Romero denied the charges and accused the then-President Ernesto Zedillo of being behind his arrest due to a political vendetta. Romero was released from prison on July 14, 2001, and later acquitted due to lack of evidence.

Flavio Romero de Velasco died on July 2, 2016, at the age of 90.

== See also ==
- Governor of Jalisco
- Cabinet of Flavio Romero de Velasco
