= Héctor Mayagoitia Domínguez =

Mexican scientist and politician (1923–2023)

Governor of Durango
- In office 1974–1979

Personal details
- Born: 7 January 1923 Victoria de Durango, Durango, Mexico
- Died: 4 October 2023 (aged 100)
- Party: Institutional Revolutionary Party

Héctor Mayagoitia Domínguez (7 January 1923 – 4 October 2023) was a Mexican chemical bacteriologist and politician, who was a member of the Institutional Revolutionary Party, Governor of Durango between 1974 and 1979, and Director of the National Polytechnic Institute (IPN) from 1979 to 1982.

== Biography ==
Mayagoitia was born in Victoria de Durango, Durango, on 7 January 1923. In 1974, he was nominated by PRI as a candidate for Governor of Durango. Mayagoitia was elected and held the position until 1979 when, less than a year before finishing his term, he was appointed Director of the National Polytechnic Institute.

In 1983, he was also named Chief of a main directorate of the National Council of Science and Technology (CONACYT) and in 1988, he was elected as a Senator representing Durango. He has received numerous awards including Commission for Protected areas of Mexico (CONANP) Award for Nature Conservation for his pioneering efforts in the establishment of the first biosphere reserves in Mexico.

Mayagoitia celebrated his centenary on 7 January 2023, and died on 4 October, aged 100.

Preceded by Alejandro Páez Urquidi	Governor of Durango; 1974–1979	Succeeded by Salvador Gámiz Fernández
