= Rogelio Flores Curiel =

Mexican army officer and politician

Governor of Nayarit

Personal details
- Born: 1924; Tepic, Nayarit
- Died: 20 October 2008; Mexico City, Mexico
- Political party: Institutional Revolutionary Party

Military service
- Allegiance: Mexico
- Branch/service: Mexican Army
- Rank: Major general

Rogelio Flores Curiel (1924-2008) was a Mexican army officer and politician who served as governor of the state of Nayarit, Mexico between 1976 and 1981.

Curiel attended Yale University and the Heroic Military Academy.

He was commander of the 13th Military Zone in Tepic and later the commander of the 15th Military Zone based in Guadalajara, Jalisco.

He was the chief of police in Mexico City when the Corpus-Christi Massacre (El Halconazo) took place. After this, he resigned and returned to his seat in the Senate of the Republic. Between 1976 and 1981, Curiel served Governor of Nayarit and was accused of electoral fraud.
