= Oscar Flores Tapia =

Mexican politician

Oscar Flores Tapia (February 5, 1913 – July 11, 1998) was a Mexican journalist, writer and politician who was a member of the Institutional Revolutionary Party. He was Governor of the state of Coahuila from December 1, 1975, until his resignation on August 11, 1981. Flores was succeeded by Governor Francisco José Madero González following his August 1981 resignation.

Flores founded the Association of Writers and Journalists Saltillo in 1950.

Oscar Flores Tapia wrote a memoir about his childhood entitled "La Casa de Mi Abuela" ("The House of My Grandmother"). It is not clear if it was first published in 1959 or in 1978—perhaps it was first published in 1959 and then re-issued two decades later. In any event, it was treated in Saltillo as if it were newly published in 1978. Probably the fact that Flores was the governor of the Mexican state of Coahuila in the late 1970s caused there to be a renewed interest in his memoir at that time.
