= Alfonso G. Calderón =

Governor of Sinaloa

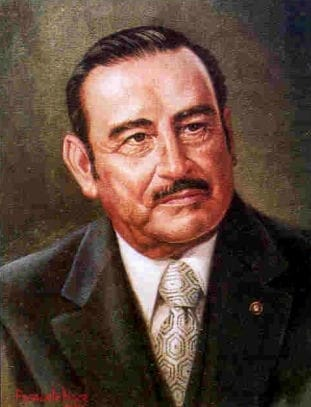
- Portrait of Alfonso G. Calderón

Governor of Sinaloa
- In office January 1, 1975 – December 31, 1980
- Preceded by: Alfredo Valdés Montoya
- Succeeded by: Antonio Toledo Corro

Personal details
- Born: Alfonso Genaro Calderón Velarde; September 19, 1913 Chihuahua
- Died: April 14, 1990 (aged 76) Ahome Municipality

Alfonso G. Calderón (19 September 1913 - 14 April 1990) was a Mexican politician who was Governor of Sinaloa from 1975 to 1980. He was born in Calabacillas, Chihuahua, of humble origins. At the age of 7, his parents moved to Los Mochis for a better work in the sugar mill. He applied for a position at SICAE and was assigned the position of electrician. In 1949, during the presidency of Miguel Alemán Valdés, he was elected federal deputy. Later he was municipal president of Ahome and treasurer of the town hall. During his governorship he cared about the citizens of the highlands of Sinaloa. It brought drinking water and electricity to the inhabitants of the mountains. At the end of his governorship he rejoined the labor tasks of the Confederation of Mexican Workers. He died on April 14, 1990 in Ahome Municipality and was buried in the municipal pantheon of Los Mochis. On the 30th anniversary of his death, a wreath and guard of honor were set up at his grave.
