= Guillermo Rossell de la Lama =

Mexican politician (1925–2010)

Guillermo Rossell de la Lama (22 July 1925 – 6 September 2010) was a Mexican politician affiliated with the Institutional Revolutionary Party (PRI). He served as the Secretary of Tourism from 1976 to 1980 and as Governor of Hidalgo from 1 April 1981 to 31 March 1987.

Rossell de la Lama was born in Pachuca, Hidalgo, on 22 July 1925, and earned his architecture degree from the National Autonomous University of Mexico (UNAM) National School of Architecture in 1951.

Guillermo Rossell de la Lama died in Mexico City on 6 September 2010, at the age of 85.

His son, Mauricio Rossell Abitia, represented the PRI in the Chamber of Deputies from 1997 to 2000.
