= Secretariat of Tourism =

Mexico Secretariat of Tourism
- Secretaría de Turismo
- Secretariat of Tourism logo

Agency overview
- Jurisdiction: Federal government of Mexico
- Agency executive: Josefina Rodríguez Zamora, Secretary
- Website: http://www.gob.mx/sectur/

The Mexican Secretary of Tourism (Spanish: Secretaría de Turismo, SECTUR) is the government department in charge of the nation's tourism promotion and development. The Secretary is appointed by the President of the Republic and is a member of the federal executive cabinet.

The department conducts the development policy for national tourist activity and promotes tourist development zones in conjunction with the states.

== List of secretaries ==
- President Luis Echeverría
  - (1975–1976) : Julio Hirschfeld Almada
- President José López Portillo
  - (1976–1980) : Guillermo Rossell de la Lama
  - (1980–1982) : Rosa Luz Alegría Escamilla
- President Miguel de la Madrid
  - (1982–1988) : Antonio Enríquez Savignac
- President Carlos Salinas de Gortari
  - (1988–1990) : Carlos Hank González
  - (1990–1993) : Pedro Joaquín Coldwell
  - (1993–1994) : Jesús Silva Herzog Flores
- President Ernesto Zedillo
  - (1994–1997) : Silvia Hernández Enríquez
  - (1997–2000) : Óscar Espinosa Villarreal
- President Vicente Fox
  - (2000–2003) : Leticia Navarro
  - (2003–2006) : Rodolfo Elizondo Torres
- President Felipe Calderón
  - (2006–2010) : Rodolfo Elizondo Torres
  - (2010–2012) : Gloria Guevara Manzo
- President Enrique Peña Nieto
  - (2012–2015) : Claudia Ruiz Massieu
  - (2015–2018) : Enrique de la Madrid Cordero
- President Andrés Manuel López Obrador
  - (2018–2024) : Miguel Torruco Marqués
- President Claudia Sheinbaum
  - (2024–present) : Josefina Rodríguez Zamora

== See also ==
- Government of Mexico
