= 1973 in Mexico =

- Decades: 1950s; 1960s; 1970s; 1980s; 1990s
- See also: History of Mexico; List of years in Mexico; Timeline of Mexican history

Events in the year 1973 in Mexico.

== Incumbents ==
=== Federal government ===
- President: Luis Echeverría
- Interior Secretary (SEGOB): Mario Moya Palencia
- Secretary of Foreign Affairs (SRE): Emilio Óscar Rabasa
- Communications Secretary (SCT): Eugenio Méndez Docurro
- Education Secretary (SEP): Víctor Bravo Ahuja
- Secretary of Defense (SEDENA): Matías Ramos
- Secretary of Navy: Luis M. Bravo Carrera
- Secretary of Labor and Social Welfare: Porfirio Muñoz Ledo
- Secretary of Welfare: Luis Enrique Bracamontes

=== Supreme Court ===
- President of the Supreme Court: Alfonso Guzmán Neyra

=== Governors ===
- Aguascalientes: Francisco Guel Jiménez
- Baja California: Milton Castellanos Everardo
- Campeche: Carlos Sansores Pérez/Carlos Pérez Cámara/Rafael Rodríguez Barrera
- Chiapas: Manuel Velasco Suárez
- Chihuahua: Oscar Flores Sánchez
- Coahuila: Eulalio Gutiérrez Treviño
- Colima: Pablo Silva García/Leonel Ramírez García
- Durango: Alejandro Páez Urquidi
- Guanajuato: Manuel M. Moreno/Luis H. Ducoing Gamba
- Guerrero: Israel Nogueda Otero
- Hidalgo: Manuel Sánchez Vite
- Jalisco: Alberto Orozco Romero
- State of Mexico: Carlos Hank González
- Michoacán: Servando Chávez Hernández
- Morelos: Felipe Rivera Crespo (PRI)
- Nayarit: Roberto Gómez Reyes
- Nuevo León: Luis M. Farías
- Oaxaca: Fernando Gómez Sandoval
- Puebla: Rafael Moreno Valle/Mario Mellado García/Gonzalo Bautista O'Farril/Guillermo Morales Blumenkron
- Querétaro: Juventino Castro Sánchez/Antonio Calzada Urquiza
- San Luis Potosí: Antonio Rocha Cordero/Guillermo Fonseca Álvarez
- Sinaloa: Alfredo Valdés Montoya
- Sonora: Faustino Félix Serna/Carlos Armando Biebrich Torres
- Tabasco: Mario Trujillo García
- Tamaulipas: Manuel A. Rabize
- Tlaxcala: Luciano Huerta Sánchez
- Veracruz: Rafael Hernández Ochoa
- Yucatán: Carlos Loret de Mola Mediz
- Zacatecas: Pedro Ruiz González
- Regent of Mexico City: Octavio Senties Gomez

== Events ==
- January 30: The 7.5 M_{s} Colima earthquake causes 56 deaths, 390 injuries, and a non-destructive tsunami in Mexico.
- June 16: The Brothers Serdán Baseball stadium opens.
- June 19: Autonomous University of Aguascalientes established.
- June 20: Aeroméxico Flight 229.
- July 1: 1973 Mexican legislative election.
- August 28: 1973 Veracruz earthquake.

== Awards ==
- Belisario Domínguez Medal of Honor – Pablo E. Macías Valenzuela

== Film ==
- List of Mexican films of 1973.

== Sport ==
- 1972–73 Mexican Primera División season.
- Diablos Rojos del México win the Mexican League.
- Lobos de Tlaxcala founded.
- Club Deportivo Tapatío is founded when CD Guadalajara buy a Tercera División license.

== Births ==
- January 17 — Cuauhtémoc Blanco, Mexican soccer player and politician, Governor of Morelos 2018-2024
- February 1 – Óscar Pérez Rojas, football goalkeeper
- February 3 – Ilana Sod, journalist
- February 22 – Mr. Niebla, (Efrén Tiburcio Márquez), wrestler; (d. December 23, 2019).
- May 20 — Patricia Navidad, actress and singer
- June 5 — Galilea Montijo, actress, comedienne, model, and TV presenter
- June 20 — Enrique Alfaro Ramírez, Governor of Jalisco 2018–2024
- June 22 — Jaime Camil, singer and actor
- August 16 — Mauricio Islas, actor
- September 19
  - Javier Duarte de Ochoa, politician (formerly PRI); Governor of Veracruz 2010-2016, arrested for alleged corruption April 15, 2016
  - David Zepeda, actor, model, and singer
- December 17 — Martha Érika Alonso, Governor of Puebla 2018 (d. 2018)

== Deaths ==
- December 3 – Adolfo Ruiz Cortines, 47th President of Mexico, 1952-1958 (b. 1890)
