= 1972 in Mexico =

- Decades: 1950s; 1960s; 1970s; 1980s; 1990s
- See also: History of Mexico; List of years in Mexico; Timeline of Mexican history

Events in the year 1972 in Mexico.

== Incumbents ==
=== Federal government ===
- President: Luis Echeverría
- Interior Secretary (SEGOB): Mario Moya Palencia
- Secretary of Foreign Affairs (SRE): Emilio Óscar Rabasa
- Communications Secretary (SCT): Eugenio Méndez Docurro
- Education Secretary (SEP): Víctor Bravo Ahuja
- Secretary of Defense (SEDENA): Matías Ramos
- Secretary of Navy: Luis M. Bravo Carrera
- Secretary of Labor and Social Welfare: Rafael Hernández Ochoa/Porfirio Muñoz Ledo
- Secretary of Welfare: Luis Enrique Bracamontes

=== Supreme Court ===
- President of the Supreme Court: Alfonso Guzmán Neyra

=== Governors ===
- Aguascalientes: Francisco Guel Jiménez
- Baja California: Milton Castellanos Everardo
- Campeche: Carlos Sansores Pérez
- Chiapas: Manuel Velasco Suárez
- Chihuahua: Oscar Flores Sánchez
- Coahuila: Eulalio Gutiérrez Treviño
- Colima: Pablo Silva García
- Durango: Alejandro Páez Urquidi
- Guanajuato: Manuel M. Moreno
- Guerrero: Israel Nogueda Otero
- Hidalgo: Donaciano Serna Leal/Manuel Sánchez Vite
- Jalisco: Alberto Orozco Romero
- State of Mexico: Carlos Hank González
- Michoacán: Servando Chávez Hernández
- Morelos: Felipe Rivera Crespo
- Nayarit: Roberto Gómez Reyes
- Nuevo León: Luis M. Farías
- Oaxaca: Fernando Gómez Sandoval
- Puebla: Rafael Moreno Valle
- Querétaro: Juventino Castro Sánchez
- San Luis Potosí: Antonio Rocha Cordero
- Sinaloa: Alfredo Valdés Montoya
- Sonora: Faustino Félix Serna
- Tabasco: Mario Trujillo García
- Tamaulipas: Manuel A. Rabize
- Tlaxcala: Luciano Huerta Sánchez
- Veracruz: Rafael Murillo Vidal
- Yucatán: Carlos Loret de Mola Mediz
- Zacatecas: Pedro Ruiz González
- Regent of Mexico City: Octavio Senties Gomez

== Events ==
- José Guadalupe Posada Museum opens.
- The Palace of Iturbide becomes the home of the Banamex Cultural Foundation (Fomento Cultural Banamex).
- The Festival Internacional Cervantino is founded in Guanajuato.
- June 14–23: Hurricane Agnes.
- September: Fred Gómez Carrasco is arrested in Guadalajara.
- September 30-October 7: Hurricane Joanne

== Awards ==
- Belisario Domínguez Medal of Honor – Ignacio Ramos Praslow

== Births ==
- January 25 – Chantal Andere, actress
- January 27 – Bibi Gaytán, Mexican singer and actress
- April 23 – Patricia Manterola, actress, fashion designer, singer, and model
- May 10 – Víctor Noriega, actor, singer, and model
- June 22 – Miguel del Toro, baseball player
- August 30 – José Ramón Amieva, acting Mayor of Mexico City 2018
- October 23 – Kate del Castillo, television actress (La Reina del Sur)
- October 23 – Dominika Paleta, Polish-Mexican actress
- November 27 – Ivonne Ortega Pacheco, politician (PRI); first elected female Governor of Yucatán 2007–2012
- December 7 – Oliver Fernández, tennis player
- December 25 – Ricardo Tejedo, actor, voice actor, ADR director, script writer and translator
- Date unknown – Marbella Ibarra, soccer coach and promoter of women's soccer (d. October 12, 2018).

== Deaths ==
- February – Concha de Albornoz, Spanish feminist (born 1900 in Spain)
- December 7 – Humberto Mariles, equestrian Olympic gold medalist (born 1913 in Mexico)

== Film ==
- List of Mexican films of 1972.

== Sport ==
- 1971–72 Mexican Primera División season.
- Cafeteros de Córdoba win the Mexican League.
- Mexico at the 1972 Summer Olympics.
- Mexico at the 1972 Summer Paralympics.
- The Adecmac soccer league is founded.
