= 1970 in Mexico =

- Decades: 1950s; 1960s; 1970s; 1980s; 1990s
- See also: History of Mexico; List of years in Mexico; Timeline of Mexican history

Events in the year 1970 in Mexico.

== Incumbents ==
=== Federal government ===
- President: Gustavo Díaz Ordaz (until 30 November), Luis Echeverría (starting 1 December)
- Interior Secretary (SEGOB): Mario Moya Palencia
- Secretary of Foreign Affairs (SRE): Antonio Carrillo Flores/Emilio Óscar Rabasa
- Communications Secretary (SCT): José Antonio Padilla Segura/Eugenio Méndez Docurro
- Education Secretary (SEP): Agustín Yáñez/Víctor Bravo Ahuja
- Secretary of Defense (SEDENA): Matías Ramos
- Secretary of Navy: Antonio Vázquez del Mercado/Luis M. Bravo Carrera
- Secretary of Labor and Social Welfare: Salomón González Blanco/Rafael Hernández Ochoa
- Secretary of Welfare: Gilberto Valenzuela/Luis Enrique Bracamontes

=== Supreme Court ===
- President of the Supreme Court: Alfonso Guzmán Neyra

=== Governors ===
- Aguascalientes: Francisco Guel Jiménez
- Baja California: Raúl Sánchez Díaz Martell
- Campeche: Carlos Sansores Pérez
- Chiapas: José Castillo Tielemans/Manuel Velasco Suárez
- Chihuahua: Oscar Flores Sánchez
- Coahuila: Eulalio Gutiérrez Treviño
- Colima: Pablo Silva García
- Durango: Alejandro Páez Urquidi
- Guanajuato: Manuel M. Moreno
- Guerrero: Caritino Maldonado Pérez
- Hidalgo: Manuel Sánchez Vite/Donaciano Serna Leal
- Jalisco: Francisco Medina Ascencio/Alberto Orozco Romero
- State of Mexico: Carlos Hank González
- Michoacán: Carlos Gálvez Betancourt/Servando Chávez Hernández
- Morelos
  - Emilio Riva Palacio (PRI), until May 18
  - Felipe Rivera Crespo (PRI), starting May 18
- Nayarit: Roberto Gómez Reyes
- Nuevo León: Eduardo Elizondo
- Oaxaca: Víctor Bravo Ahuja/Fernando Gómez Sandoval
- Puebla: Rafael Moreno Valle
- Querétaro: Juventino Castro Sánchez
- San Luis Potosí: Antonio Rocha Cordero
- Sinaloa: Alfredo Valdés Montoya
- Sonora: Faustino Félix Serna
- Tabasco: Manuel R. Mora Martínez
- Tamaulipas: Manuel A. Rabize
- Tlaxcala: Ignacio Bonillas/Crisanto Cuéllar Abaroa/Luciano Huerta Sánchez
- Veracruz: Rafael Murillo Vidal
- Yucatán: Luis Torres Mesías/Carlos Loret de Mola Mediz
- Zacatecas: Pedro Ruiz González
- Regent of the Federal District
  - Alfonso Corona del Rosal (until July 31)
  - Alfonso Martínez Domínguez (starting August 1)

== Events ==
- The Consejo Nacional de Ciencia y Tecnología founded.
- May 23: Roman Catholic Territorial Prelature of Cancún-Chetumal established.
- July 5: 1970 Mexican general election.
- August 31 – September 5: Tropical Storm Norma.
- November 20: Metro Hospital General opens.
- November 23: The Boundary Treaty of 1970 is signed.

== Awards ==
- Belisario Domínguez Medal of Honor – Rosendo Salazar

== Film ==
- List of Mexican films of 1970

== Sport ==
- 1969–70 Mexican Primera División season
- 1970 Mexican Primera División season
- 1970 FIFA World Cup
- Rojos del Águila de Veracruz win the Mexican League
- 1970 Mexican Grand Prix
- Club Universidad de Guadalajara and Club Jalisco are founded.

== Births ==
- February 16 — Nailea Norvind, actress
- April 13 — Eduardo Capetillo, singer and actor
- June 17 — Sasha Sokol, singer, composer, actress, and television host
- September 18 — Miguel Ángel Riquelme Solís, politician (PRI) and Governor of Coahuila starting 2017
- September 29 — Ninel Conde, Mexican actress, singer, and television host
- October 1 — José Ignacio Peralta, Governor of Colima starting 2016
- October 8 — Mayrín Villanueva, model and actress
- December 28 — Yolanda Andrade, Mexican actress and television presenter

== Deaths ==
- October 19 – Lázaro Cárdenas, 44th President of Mexico (b. 1895)
