= 1971 in Mexico =

- Decades: 1950s; 1960s; 1970s; 1980s; 1990s
- See also: History of Mexico; List of years in Mexico; Timeline of Mexican history

Events in the year 1971 in Mexico.

== Incumbents ==
=== Federal government ===
- President: Luis Echeverría
- Interior Secretary (SEGOB): Mario Moya Palencia
- Secretary of Foreign Affairs (SRE): Emilio Óscar Rabasa
- Communications Secretary (SCT): Eugenio Méndez Docurro
- Education Secretary (SEP): Víctor Bravo Ahuja
- Secretary of Defense (SEDENA): Matías Ramos
- Secretary of Navy: Luis M. Bravo Carrera
- Secretary of Labor and Social Welfare: Rafael Hernández Ochoa
- Secretary of Welfare: Luis Enrique Bracamontes

=== Supreme Court ===
- President of the Supreme Court: Alfonso Guzmán Neyra

=== Governors ===
- Aguascalientes: Francisco Guel Jiménez
- Baja California
  - Raúl Sánchez Díaz Martell, until October 31
  - Milton Castellanos Everardo starting November 1, 1971
- Campeche: Carlos Sansores Pérez
- Chiapas: Manuel Velasco Suárez
- Chihuahua: Oscar Flores Sánchez
- Coahuila: Eulalio Gutiérrez Treviño
- Colima: Pablo Silva García
- Durango: Alejandro Páez Urquidi
- Guanajuato: Manuel M. Moreno
- Guerrero: Caritino Maldonado Pérez/Roberto Rodríguez Mercado/Israel Nogueda Otero
- Hidalgo: Donaciano Serna Leal
- Jalisco: Francisco Medina Ascencio/Alberto Orozco Romero
- State of Mexico: Carlos Hank González
- Michoacán: Servando Chávez Hernández
- Morelos: Felipe Rivera Crespo
- Nayarit: Roberto Gómez Reyes
- Nuevo León: Eduardo Elizondo/Luis M. Farías
- Oaxaca: Fernando Gómez Sandoval
- Puebla: Rafael Moreno Valle
- Querétaro: Juventino Castro Sánchez
- San Luis Potosí: Antonio Rocha Cordero
- Sinaloa: Alfredo Valdés Montoya
- Sonora: Faustino Félix Serna
- Tabasco: Mario Trujillo García
- Tamaulipas: Manuel A. Rabize
- Tlaxcala: Luciano Huerta Sánchez
- Veracruz: Rafael Murillo Vidal
- Yucatán: Carlos Loret de Mola Mediz
- Zacatecas: Pedro Ruiz González
- Regent of the Federal District
  - Alfonso Martínez Domínguez (until June 15)
  - Octavio Sentíes Gómez (starting June 15)

== Events ==
- Aeronáutica Agrícola Mexicana SA formed.
- June 10: Corpus Christi massacre.
- June 10: Opening of the Metro Observatorio.
- September 3–13: Hurricane Fern.
- September 5–18: Hurricane Edith.
- November 11: National Institute of Astrophysics, Optics and Electronics is established.

== Awards ==
- Belisario Domínguez Medal of Honor – Jaime Torres Bodet

== Births ==
=== February ===
- February 10 — Lorena Rojas, actress and singer (d. 2015)
- February 22 — Super Caló, wrestler

=== May ===
- May 14 − Mónica Arriola Gordillo, politician (New Alliance Party), Deputy (2006-2009); (d. 2016).

=== June ===
- June 16 – Alejandro Jano Fuentes, singer
- June 17 — Paulina Rubio, singer

=== July ===
- July 12 — Andrea Legarreta, actress and TV host

=== August ===
- August 26 — Thalía, singer

=== November ===
- November 24 — Jesús Rodríguez Almeida, acting Governor of Puebla 2018-2019

=== Date unknown ===
- Emma Laura, soap opera actress

== Deaths ==
- August 11 – Archbishop Manuel Pío López Estrada, 6th bishop of Veracruz, and first archbishop of Xalapa, 1939-1968 (b. May 5, 1891)

== Film ==
- List of Mexican films of 1971.

== Sport ==
- 1970–71 Mexican Primera División season.
- Charros de Jalisco win the Mexican League.
- September 19: Atlético Español founded.
