= 1969 in Mexico =

- Decades: 1940s; 1950s; 1960s; 1970s; 1980s
- See also: History of Mexico; List of years in Mexico; Timeline of Mexican history

Events in the year 1969 in Mexico.

== Incumbents ==
=== Federal government ===
- President: Gustavo Díaz Ordaz
- Interior Secretary (SEGOB): Luis Echeverría Álvarez (until 10 November), Mario Moya Palencia (starting 11 November)
- Secretary of Foreign Affairs (SRE): Antonio Carrillo Flores
- Communications Secretary (SCT): José Antonio Padilla Segura
- Education Secretary (SEP): Agustín Yáñez
- Secretary of Defense (SEDENA): Matías Ramos
- Secretary of Navy: Antonio Vázquez del Mercado
- Secretary of Labor and Social Welfare: Salomón González Blanco
- Secretary of Welfare: Gilberto Valenzuela/Luis Enrique Bracamontes

=== Supreme Court ===
- President of the Supreme Court: Alfonso Guzmán Neyra

=== Governors ===
- Aguascalientes:Francisco Guel Jiménez
- Baja California: Raúl Sánchez Díaz Martell
- Campeche: Carlos Sansores Pérez
- Chiapas: José Castillo Tielemans
- Chihuahua: Oscar Flores Sánchez
- Coahuila: Braulio Fernández Aguirre/Eulalio Gutiérrez Treviño
- Colima: Pablo Silva García
- Durango: Alejandro Páez Urquidi
- Guanajuato: Manuel M. Moreno
- Guerrero: Raymundo Abarca Alarcón/Caritino Maldonado Pérez
- Hidalgo: Carlos Ramírez Guerrero/Manuel Sánchez Vite
- Jalisco: Francisco Medina Ascencio
- State of Mexico: Juan Fernández Albarrán/Carlos Hank González
- Michoacán: Carlos Gálvez Betancourt
- Morelos: Emilio Riva Palacio
- Nayarit: Julián Gazcón Mercado
- Nuevo León: Eduardo Elizondo
- Oaxaca: Víctor Bravo Ahuja
- Puebla: Aarón Merino Fernández/Rafael Moreno Valle
- Querétaro: Juventino Castro Sánchez
- San Luis Potosí: Antonio Rocha Cordero
- Sinaloa: Alfredo Valdés Montoya
- Sonora: Faustino Félix Serna
- Tabasco: Manuel R. Mora Martínez
- Tamaulipas: Praxedis Balboa/Manuel A. Rabize
- Tlaxcala: Anselmo Cervantes/Ignacio Bonillas
- Veracruz: Rafael Murillo Vidal
- Yucatán: Luis Torres Mesías
- Zacatecas: Pedro Ruiz González
- Regent of the Federal District: Alfonso Corona del Rosal

== Events ==
- Allende meteorite falls in Allende, Chihuahua.
- The Universidad Regiomontana, the Autonomous University of Nayarit and the University of Monterrey are established.
- Treaty of Tlatelolco
- Non-nuclear Proliferation Treaty for Latin America and the Caribbean
- March 18: a mass shooting happenes at the Ethiopian embassy killing 4 and injuring 6
- March 31: Mina de Barroterán coal mine disaster
- June 4: Mexicana Flight 704
- June 27–30: The American rock group The Doors perform four concerts in Mexico City.
- September 4: Opening of the Mexico City Metro Line 1

== Awards ==
- Belisario Domínguez Medal of Honor – María Cámara Vales

== Film ==
- List of Mexican films of 1969

== Sport ==
- 1968–69 Mexican Primera División season
- 1969 Mexican Grand Prix
- May 31 – June 21: 1970 FIFA World Cup
- October 3 – 5: 1969 World Judo Championships held in Mexico City.

== Births ==
- January 13 — Beatriz Gutiérrez Müller, Mexican writer, wife of Andrés Manuel López Obrador
- January 31 — Urbano Zea, swimmer who competed in the 1988 Summer Olympics; (d. 2018)
- June 17 — Claudia Pavlovich Arellano, lawyer and first female Governor of Sonora starting 2015
- June 29 — Guillermo Padrés Elías, Governor of Sonora 2009–2015. Arrested for embezzlement on November 10, 2016 and released on February 2, 2019
- April 21 — Carlos Mendoza Davis, lawyer and Governor of Baja California Sur starting 2015
- May 9 — Benjamín Rivera, voice actor
- July 9 — Eduardo Santamarina, actor
- August 5 — Diego Schoening, singer, actor, television host
- September 1 — Armando Araiza, actor
- September 28 — Pedro Fernández, singer, songwriter, actor
- October 24 — Adela Noriega, actress
- Date unknown
  - Marco Antonio Mena Rodríguez, Governor of Tlaxcala starting 2017.
  - Armando Mendoza Duarte, politician.

== Deaths ==
- September 22 – Adolfo López Mateos, 48th President of Mexico (b. 1909)
