= 1976 Mexican general election =

- 4 July 1976
- Presidential election
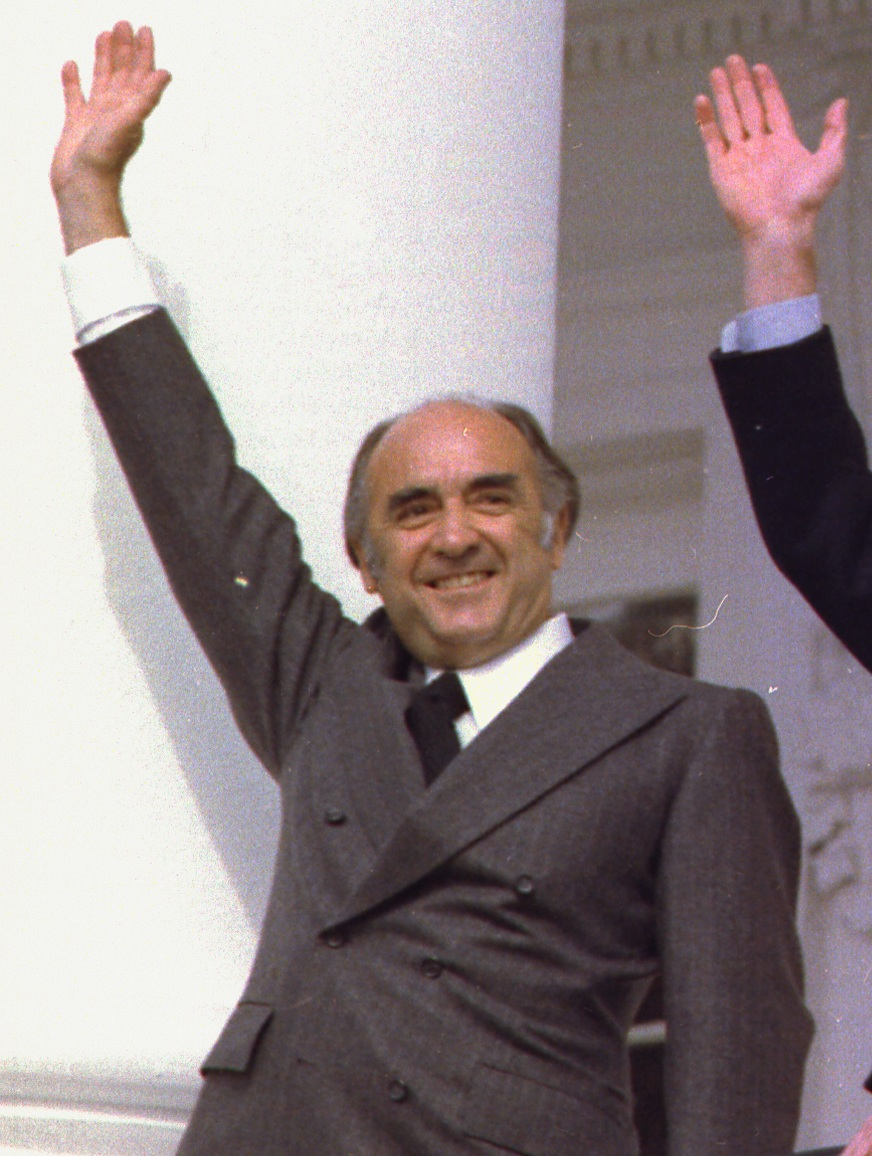
Nominee	José López Portillo
Party	PRI
Popular vote	16,727,993
Percentage	100%
President before election
Luis Echeverría
PRI
Elected President
José López Portillo
PRI

General elections were held in Mexico on 4 July 1976. José López Portillo was the only candidate in the presidential election, and was elected unopposed. In the Chamber of Deputies election, the Institutional Revolutionary Party (PRI) won 195 of the 237 seats, as well as winning 64 seats in the Senate election. (Note: In Oaxaca, the PRI formed an electoral alliance with the Popular Socialist Party (PPS); the coalition candidate, Jorge Cruickshank García, sat as a PPS senator.) Voter turnout was 65% in the Senate election and 62% in the Chamber election.

The deputies elected served during the 50th session of Congress (1976 to 1979), while the senators additionally served during the 51st session (1979–1982).

== Background ==
Before the electoral reform of 1977, only four political parties were allowed to participate in the elections: the ruling Institutional Revolutionary Party (PRI), the Popular Socialist Party (PPS), the Authentic Party of the Mexican Revolution (PARM) and the right-wing National Action Party (PAN), which was practically the only real opposition party at the time.

The campaign and the elections took place during a tense period: the government's conflict with the private sector, the mounting economic issues (which would lead to a devaluation of the peso a month after the election), the leftist guerrilla uprisings in some parts of the country and the Dirty War the government took against them were some of the issues that outgoing President Luis Echeverría faced and which jeopardised the power of the ruling PRI.

== Nomination of the PRI presidential candidate ==
Some of the PRI contenders for the party's 1976 presidential candidacy were:

- Mario Moya Palencia (Secretary of the Interior). He was initially perceived as the natural candidate to succeed President Luis Echeverría, given that Echeverría and his predecessor Gustavo Díaz Ordaz had been Secretaries of the Interior immediately prior to receiving the presidential nomination. Moya Palencia was also reported to have the support of the Army and most of the State Governors for his candidacy.
- Porfirio Muñoz Ledo (Secretary of Labor). He was noted for his large government experience at his relatively young age, having had a meteoric rise in the PRI ranks. He was reported to have the support of the Confederation of Mexican Workers in his bid for the presidency.
- Augusto Gómez Villanueva (Secretary of Agrarian Reform). Close to President Echeverría, his previous experience as President of the National Peasants' Confederation as well as his tenure as Secretary of Agrarian Reform solidified his leadership of the peasant sector, which supported his presidential bid.
- José López Portillo (Secretary of Finance). He had little political experience – having previously been a law teacher and later working as a government bureaucrat – but he had the particular advantage of being a childhood friend of President Echeverría, to whom he owed his government career, including his arrival at the Secretariat of Finance in 1973. López Portillo was not initially considered a serious contender for the PRI's presidential candidacy, as he didn't seem to have the support of any of the PRI's sectors for his bid, and he was relatively ignored by reporters and other politicians in comparison to the aforementioned contenders.

In October 1974, the Instituto Mexicano de Opinión Pública (IMOP) carried out, for the first time in Mexican politics, an opinion poll to reveal the public's perceptions of the contenders and their chances to obtain the PRI presidential candidacy in 1976 and succeed Echeverría. 2,730 people were asked to choose which contender, in their opinion, better fit the following criteria:

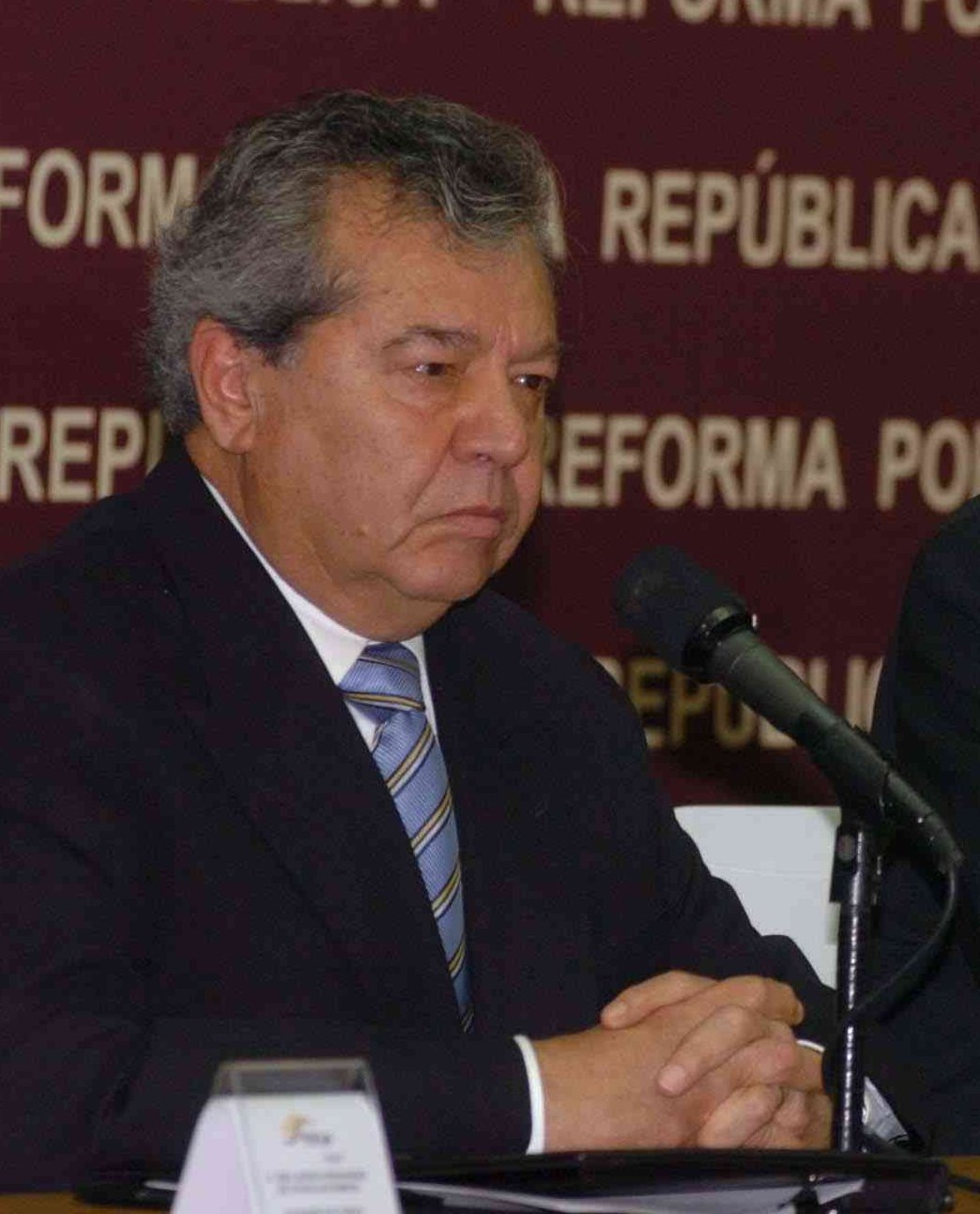
Porfirio Muñoz Ledo was one of the main contenders for the PRI presidential candidacy. He was ultimately not the one chosen by President Echeverría to succeed him, but he maintained considerable power after being appointed as President of the PRI's National Executive Committee and General Coordinator of López Portillo's campaign.

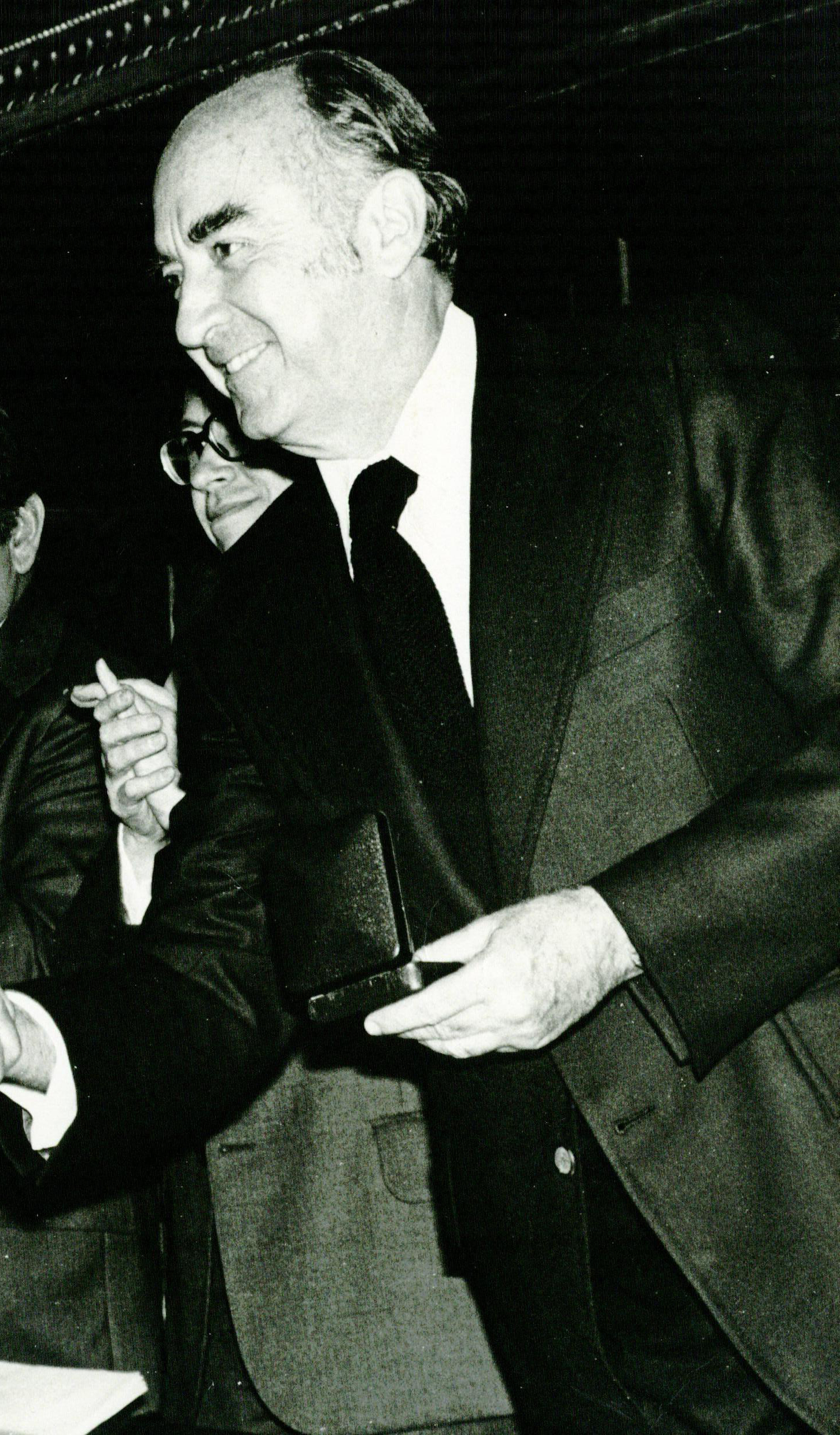
A childhood friend of President Echeverría, Secretary of Finance José López Portillo was not initially considered a serious contender for the PRI presidential candidacy by the media nor by other politicians. He was ultimately chosen by Echeverría as his successor, to the surprise of the general public and the political establishment.

IMOP Poll regarding the 1976 presidential succession
Preferred candidate		The most viable candidate		The candidate most to the establishment's liking	
Mario Moya Palencia	41.4%	José López Portillo	34.1%	Porfirio Muñoz Ledo	37.3%
José López Portillo	23.2%	Mario Moya Palencia	29.3%	José López Portillo	28.2%
Porfirio Muñoz Ledo	20.6%	Hugo Cervantes del Río	27.4%	Mario Moya Palencia	19.8%
Hugo Cervantes del Río	14.8%	Porfirio Muñoz Ledo	25.6%	Hugo Cervantes del Río	15.7%
-		Carlos Hank González	14.6%	-	
-		Carlos Gálvez Betancourt	2.0%	-	
-		Luis Enrique Bracamontes	1.6%	-	
Date: October 1974. Sample size: 2730. Source:

Muñoz Ledo would later recall that during this period, he received a visit from President Echeverría. During the meeting at Muñoz Ledo's house, Echeverría went to the garden and commented that it was "too small to receive delegations". Muñoz Ledo understood the phrase as meaning that he would be the chosen one to succeed him as President, interpreting Echeverría's comment as referring to the PRI delegations that would visit his house to congratulate him on his nomination, and so he decided to buy the land that was behind the garden so as to enlarge it. However, he would later discover that he had misinterpreted Echeverría's comment, and that he wasn't his chosen candidate.

In June 1975, Echeverría privately told López Portillo that he would be his successor, and on 5 October he was officially nominated by the PRI as its presidential candidate for the 1976 elections. The aforementioned Muñoz Ledo was then appointed both President of the PRI's National Executive Committee as well as General Coordinator of López Portillo's campaign, while López Portillo appointed Julio Rodolfo Moctezuma as director of the party's Instituto de Estudios Políticos, Económicos y Sociales (IEPES).

Echeverría would later state that he chose López Portillo to succeed him because, as president, "I was aware that the country's main problem was the financial one", which should be faced by his Secretary of Finance, "who had shared with me the attacks of a reactionary and obtuse private sector, which did not hesitate to place its funds abroad in their eagerness to break me down".

== Campaign ==
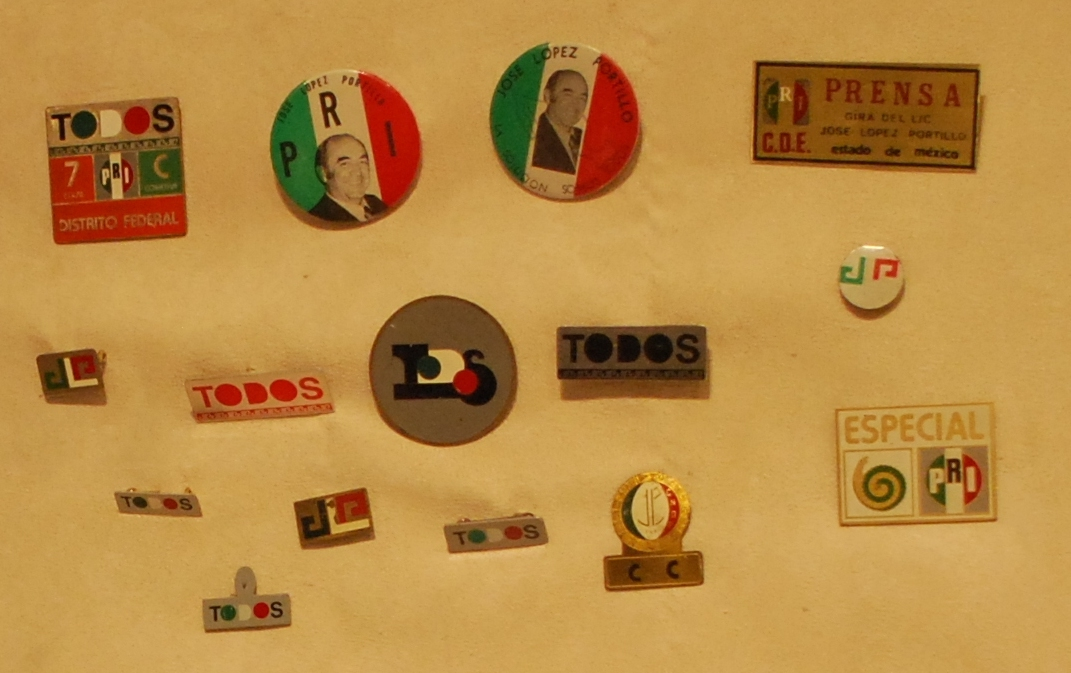
López Portillo campaign buttons.

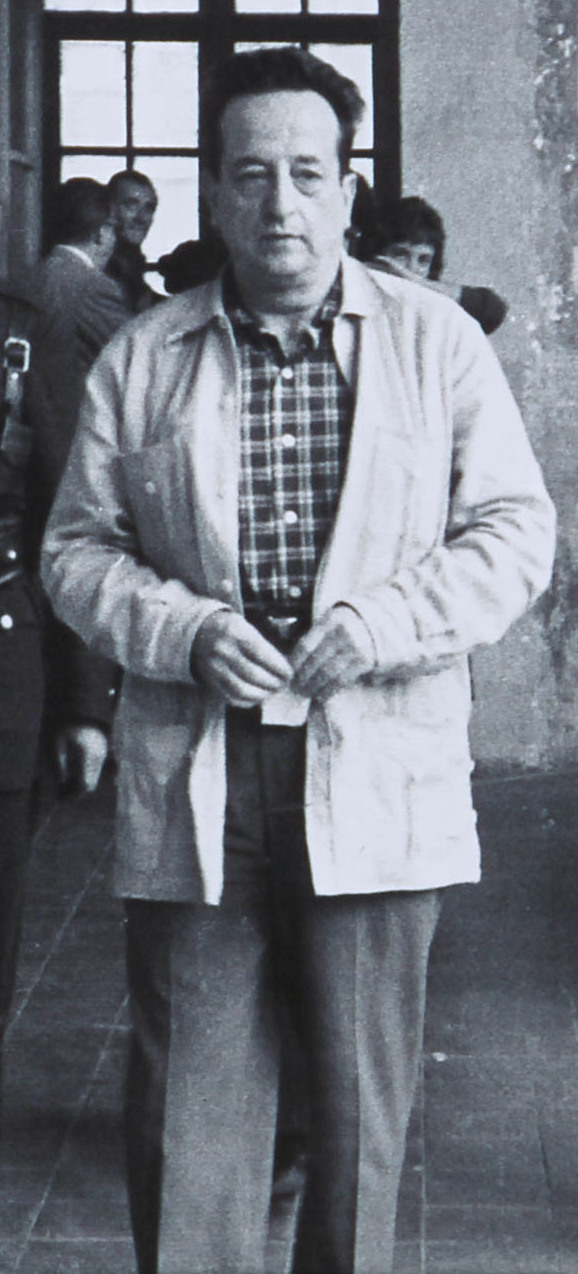
Valentín Campa ran as a write-in candidate for the Mexican Communist Party.

The PPS and the PARM supported López Portillo's candidacy, as they had traditionally done with previous candidates for the PRI.

At the time, the opposition party PAN was going through internal conflicts and, for the first time upon its foundation, was unable to nominate a candidate for the 1976 presidential elections.

On the other hand, the Mexican Communist Party nominated Valentín Campa as their presidential candidate. At the time, however, this party had no official registry and was not allowed to participate in elections, so Campa's candidacy was not officially recognized and he didn't have access to the media. He had to run as a write-in candidate, as he would not appear in the ballots.

These factors led to López Portillo effectively running unopposed. His campaign echoed this "unanimous" support for him, and his slogan was "La solución somos todos" ("All of us are the solution"). López Portillo later joked that, due to running without opposition, it would have been enough for "his mother's vote for him" to win the election.

López Portillo had been separated from his wife Carmen Romano for some time, but upon being nominated by the PRI as its presidential candidate, the two of them were persuaded by PRI advisers to reunite and to maintain the appearance of a solid marriage, so as to not alienate the largely conservative, catholic populace.

Popular Cuban singer Celia Cruz recorded a jingle for the López Portillo campaign, titled "¿Dónde estás, José?" ("Where are you, José"?). Other entertainers such as Enrique Guzmán and María Elena Velasco performed on an LP issued by the López Portillo campaign.

In his campaign, López Portillo defended the infamous acarreo ("hauling", the practice of trucking people to rallies to cheer its candidates in exchange for gifts of some kind), saying that the attendees "are not ‘hauled’, they are ‘transported’ by the Party's own men and forces", adding that "All organized truck drivers in Mexico are part of the PRI and it is a tradition for them to take their vehicles to transport people to public events". He further justified in his autobiography that there was "no reason not to facilitate, for example, to our peasants, transportation to public meetings, who concur, after all, to communicate with a System that governs them, through understandable acts in which they participate, see, hear, learn, express themselves and even, are distracted with trips and companies. The Party can, the Party must."

== Results ==
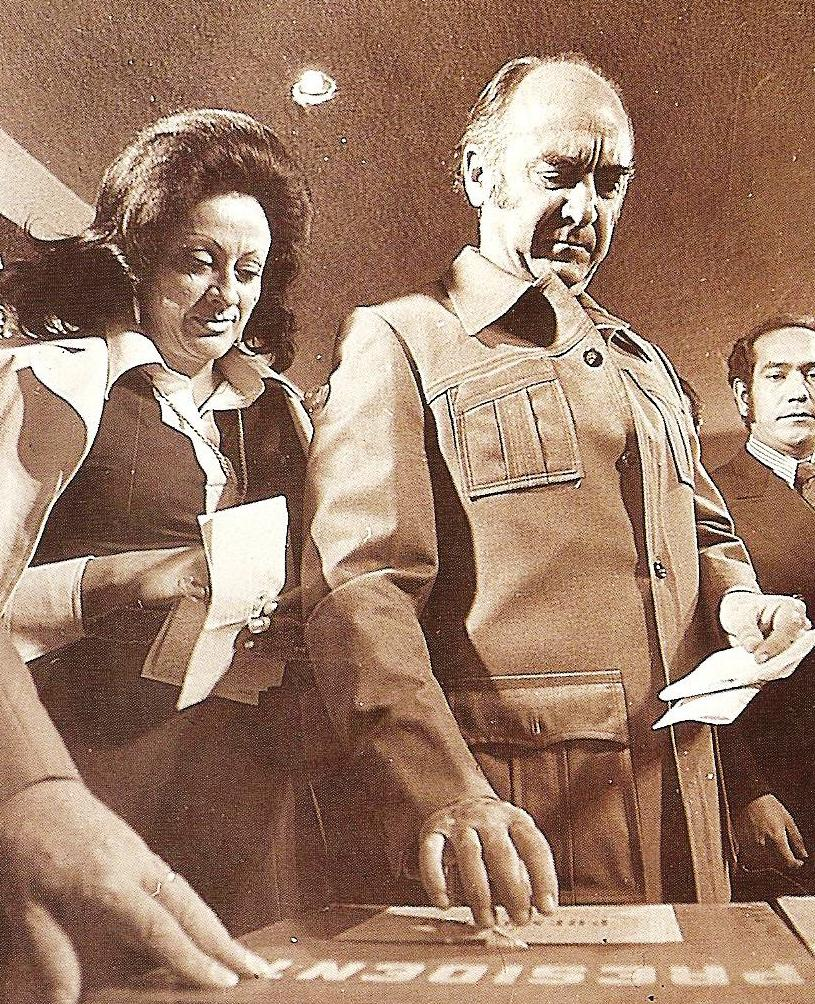
López Portillo and his wife Carmen Romano voting.

=== President ===
Candidate	Party	Votes	%
José López Portillo	Institutional Revolutionary Party	15,435,321	92.27
José López Portillo	Popular Socialist Party	648,778	3.88
José López Portillo	Authentic Party of the Mexican Revolution	339,922	2.03
José López Portillo	Personal votes	303,972	1.82
Total		16,727,993	100.00
Registered voters/turnout		25,913,066	–
Source: INEGI, Nohlen

==== By state ====
State	José López Portillo (PRI + PARM + PPS)		Unregistered candidates		Null votes		Total
State	Votes	%	Votes	%	Votes	%	Total
Aguascalientes	102,968	93.75%	406	0.36%	6,451	5.87%	109,825
Baja California	314,950	91.44%	1,559	0.45%	27,893	8.09%	344,402
Baja California Sur	46,458	94.12%	201	0.40%	2,699	5.46%	49,358
Campeche	139,050	99.62%	66	0.04%	460	0.32%	139,576
Chiapas	481,092	99.55%	191	0.03%	1,978	0.40%	483,261
Chihuahua	403,350	89.19%	1,800	0.39%	47,073	10.40%	452,223
Coahuila	516,436	99.76%	927	0.17%	312	0.06%	517,675
Colima	62,973	97.29%	382	0.59%	1,371	2.11%	64,726
Durango	341,960	98.79%	850	0.24%	3,330	0.96%	346,140
Federal District	2,210,573	79.22%	121,042	4.33%	458,744	16.44%	2,790,359
Guanajuato	810,619	97.99%	1,546	0.18%	15,022	1.81%	827,187
Guerrero	689,829	98.74%	1,585	0.22%	7,189	1.02%	698,603
Hidalgo	520,027	96.48%	1,767	0.32%	17,193	3.18%	538,987
Jalisco	1,012,985	93.85%	7,949	0.73%	58,360	5.40%	1,079,294
Michoacán	745,111	97.76%	1,548	0.20%	15,507	2.03%	762,166
Morelos	204,312	92.21%	2,413	1.08%	14,825	6.69%	221,550
Nayarit	205,738	97.05%	649	0.30%	5,589	2.63%	211,976
Nuevo León	335,474	90.13%	20,757	5.77%	15,946	4.28%	372,177
Oaxaca	760,754	99.73%	1,581	0.20%	474	0.06%	762,809
Puebla	752,416	95.44%	5,402	0.68%	30,528	3.87%	788,346
Querétaro	214,137	97.07%	847	0.38%	5,601	2.53%	220,585
Quintana Roo	48,960	97.64%	17	0.03%	1,163	2.31%	50,140
San Luis Potosí	495,863	97.75%	3,789	0.74%	7,615	1.50%	507,267
Sinaloa	294,511	97.93%	1,559	0.51%	4,650	1.54%	300,720
Sonora	514,678	99.55%	597	0.11%	1,725	0.33%	517,000
State of Mexico	1,341,791	90.46%	22,830	1.53%	118,628	7.99%	1,483,249
Tabasco	285,421	99.57%	425	0.14%	796	0.27%	286,642
Tamaulipas	446,189	96.05%	2,569	0.55%	15,767	3.39%	464,525
Tlaxcala	202,943	99.98%	16	0.007%	9	0.004%	202,968
Veracruz	1,331,085	98.46%	4,762	0.35%	16,032	1.18%	1,351,879
Yucatán	333,602	92.59%	556	0.15%	26,114	7.24%	360,272
Zacatecas	296,683	98.57%	1,476	0.49%	2,826	0.93%	300,985
Total	16,462,930	93.50%	212,064	1.20%	931,870	5.29%	17,606,872
Source: CEDE

=== Senate ===
Jorge Cruickshank García from the Popular Socialist Party was elected to the Senate for the state of Oaxaca. Although he ran in coalition with the PRI and therefore was not an opposition senator, he was the first Senator not to come from the PRI (or its predecessors) since 1929.

Party	Votes	%	Seats	+/–
Institutional Revolutionary Party	13,406,825	87.51	63	0
National Action Party	1,245,406	8.13	0	0
Popular Socialist Party	438,850	2.86	1	+1
Authentic Party of the Mexican Revolution	188,788	1.23	0	0
Non-registered candidates	40,662	0.27	0	0
Total	15,320,531	100.00	64	0
Valid votes	15,320,531	91.59		
Invalid/blank votes	1,407,472	8.41		
Total votes	16,728,003	100.00		
Registered voters/turnout	25,913,066	64.55		
Source: Nohlen

=== Chamber of Deputies ===
For this election, the Chamber of Deputies comprised a total of 237 deputies, of whom 196 were elected by majority vote in each electoral district and 41 more were party deputies, allocated in proportion to the votes that the non-winning parties obtained in the districts.

Party	Votes	%	Seats	+/–
Institutional Revolutionary Party	12,868,104	84.89	195	+6
National Action Party	1,358,403	8.96	20	–5
Popular Socialist Party	479,228	3.16	12	+2
Authentic Party of the Mexican Revolution	403,274	2.66	10	+3
Non-registered candidates	49,471	0.33	0	0
Total	15,158,480	100.00	237	+6
Valid votes	15,158,480	94.33		
Invalid/blank votes	910,431	5.67		
Total votes	16,068,911	100.00		
Registered voters/turnout	25,913,066	62.01		
Source: Nohlen

== Aftermath ==
There were many rumours that outgoing president Luis Echeverría was planning to carry out a coup d'état against his own candidate, López Portillo, to perpetuate himself in power. On 13 August, the Liga Comunista 23 de Septiembre tried to kidnap Margarita López Portillo, the president-elect's sister; the attempt failed and the Liga's leader, David Jiménez Sarmiento, was killed by security forces during the incident.

In the end, López Portillo took office as scheduled on 1 December without further incidents.

=== Legitimacy in dispute ===
Although the results ensured the PRI remained in power, the lack of opposition to José López Portillo raised concerns about the lack of legitimacy of the Mexican political system. As a result, an electoral reform law was enacted in 1977, introducing partial proportional representation for the Congressional and Senate elections in order to ensure better representation of opposition parties – something extremely difficult under the first-past-the-post system that had been in force. However, the PRI retained its position as the dominant party, retaining the presidency until Vicente Fox of the National Action Party was elected in 2000.

The 1976 elections were the last in which a presidential candidate ran unopposed.
