= Algeria–Mexico relations =

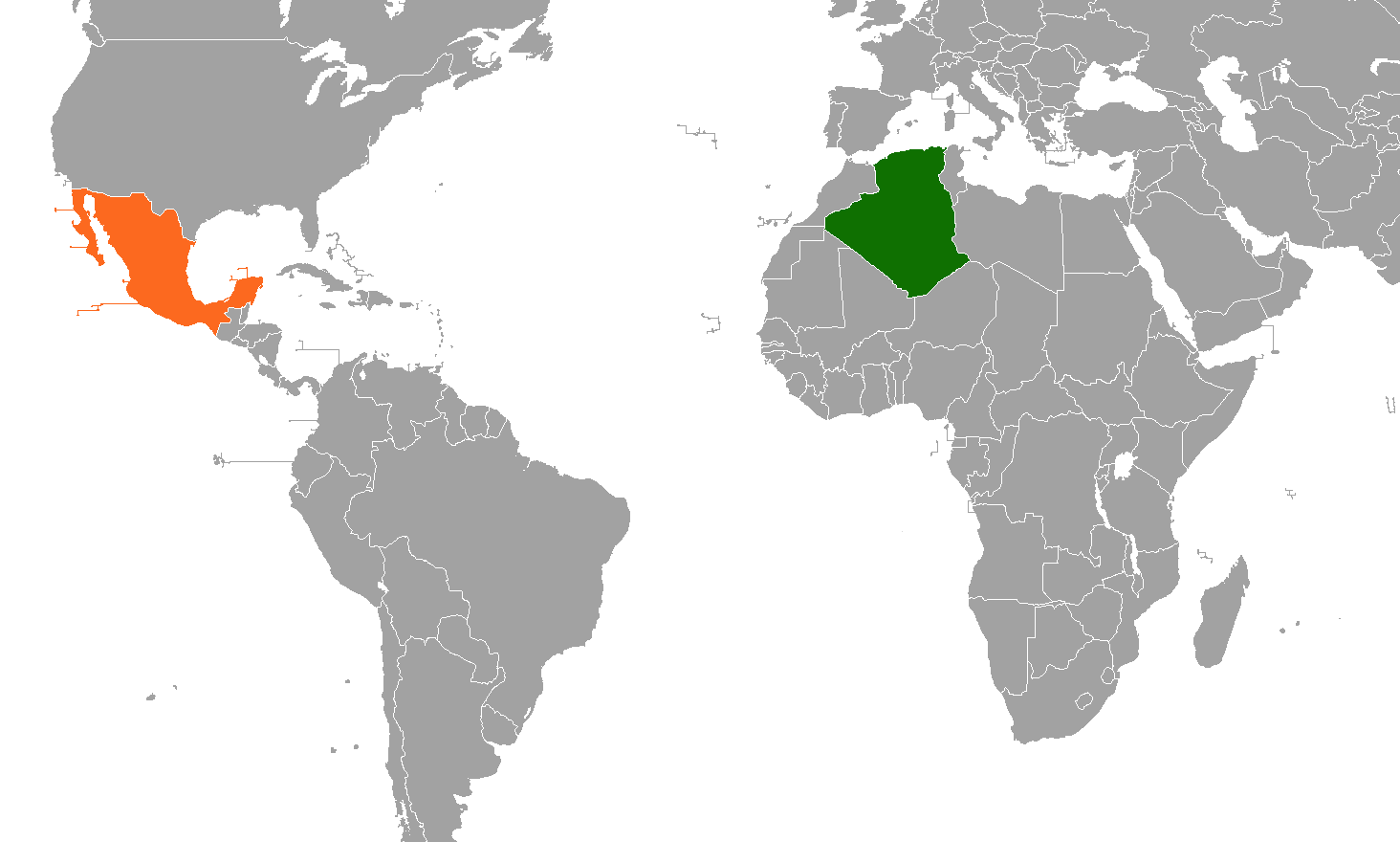

- Algeria: Mexico

The nations of Algeria and Mexico established diplomatic relations in 1964. Both nations are members of the Group of 15, Group of 24 and the United Nations.

== History ==
In 1955, during the Algerian War of Independence, Mexico voted in favor of including the "Algerian question" on the agenda of the United Nations General Assembly and supported the legitimate aspiration of the Algerian people for independence. In 1962, Mexico was the first country to recognize the newly independent Algeria after gaining independence from France. Diplomatic relations between the two nations were formally established on 21 October 1964.

In 1965, Mexico's ambassador in Cairo, Egypt was accredited to Algeria. In 1974, a resident embassy of Mexico was opened in Algiers and in 1975, Algeria opened an embassy in Mexico City.

In 1975, President Luis Echeverría became the first Mexican head-of-state to visit Algeria. In 1981, Algerian President Chadli Bendjedid paid his first visit to Mexico to attend the North–South Summit in Cancún.

In 2002, Algerian President Abdelaziz Bouteflika paid a visit to the northern Mexican city of Monterrey to attend the Monterrey Consensus. In February 2005, Mexican President Vicente Fox paid an official visit to Algeria and met with Algerian President Abdelaziz Bouteflika. In 2008, as a sign of mutual friendship, a statue of Abdelkader El Djezairi was unveiled in Mexico City. In 2011, a statue dedicated to Emiliano Zapata was unveiled in Algiers. In July 2009, Mexican Foreign Secretary Patricia Espinosa paid a visit to Algeria. In April 2015, Mexican Foreign Secretary José Antonio Meade also paid a visit to Algeria.

In 2016, the Mexican Chamber of Deputies created the Mexico-Algeria Friendship Group, composed of 11 legislators. The group will be used to promote cooperation in cultural, touristic, technological, educational, commercial and in investments between both countries, as well as increasing multilateral relations. In May 2022, both nations held the Fifth Bilateral Meeting of the Mechanism for Consultations on Matters of Common Interests in Mexico City and attended by Algerian Deputy Foreign Minister Chakib Rachid Kaid.

In 2024, both nations celebrated 60 years of diplomatic relations.

== High-level visits ==
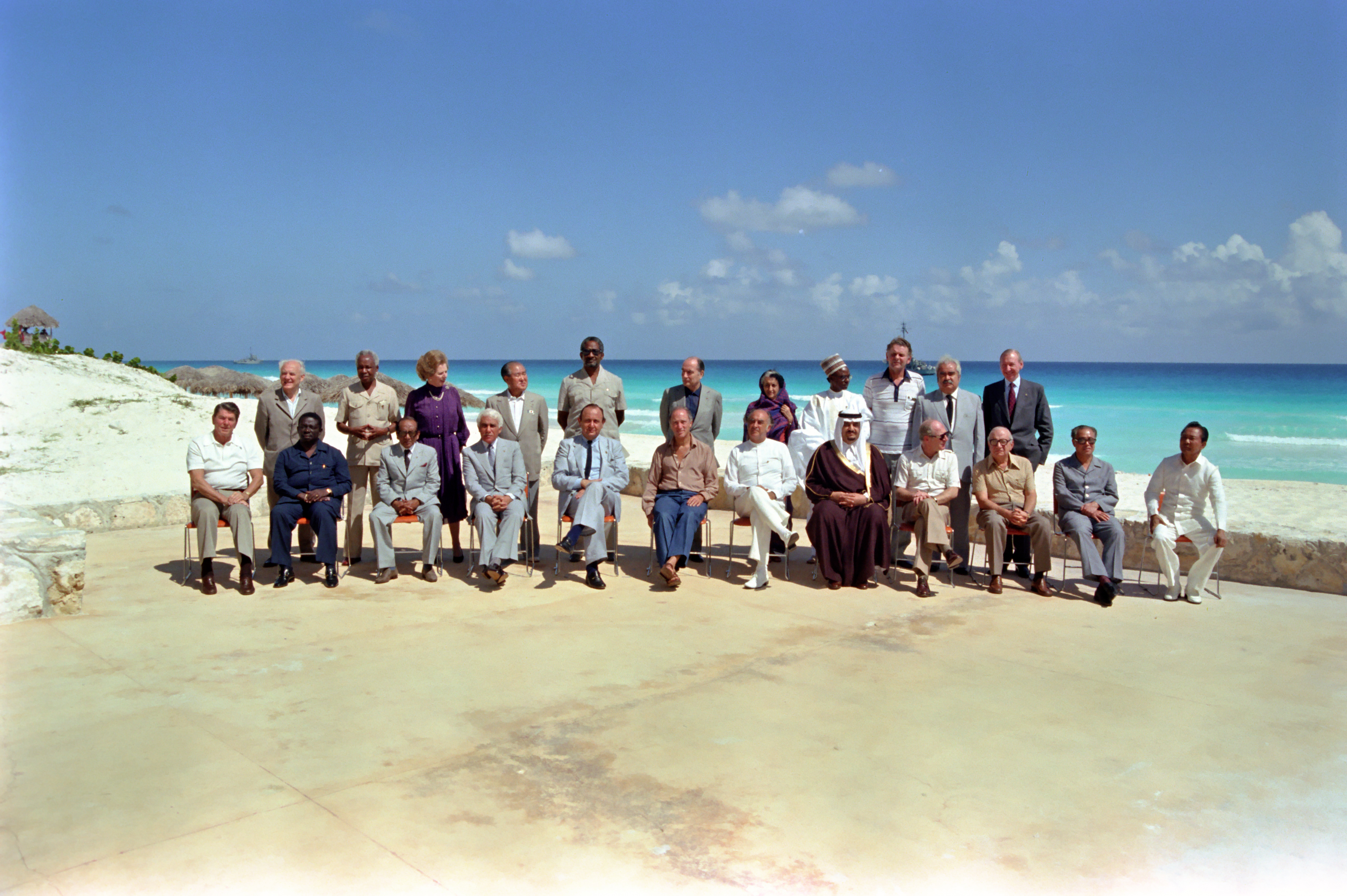
President Chadli Bendjedid attending the North–South Summit in Cancun along with his Mexican counterpart President José López Portillo; 1981.

High-level visits from Algeria to Mexico

- President Chadli Bendjedid (1981 & 1985)
- Foreign Minister Ahmed Taleb Ibrahimi (1985)
- President Abdelaziz Bouteflika (2002)
- President of the Council of the Nation Abdelkader Bensalah (2018)
- Deputy Foreign Minister Chakib Rachid Kaid (2022)

High-level visits from Mexico to Algeria

- Foreign Minister Emilio Óscar Rabasa (1974)
- President Luis Echeverría (1975)
- Foreign Minister Bernardo Sepúlveda Amor (1986)
- President Vicente Fox (2005)
- Foreign Minister Patricia Espinosa (2009)
- Foreign Minister José Antonio Meade (2015)

== Bilateral agreements ==
Both nations have signed several bilateral agreements such as an Agreement on Cultural Cooperation (1977); Agreement on Cooperation in the Field of Hydrocarbons and their derivatives industry between Pemex and Sonatrach (1984); Agreement on establishing an Intergovernmental Commission for Economic, Commercial, Scientific and Technological Cooperation (1985); and an Agreement on Technical Cooperation on Water Resources (2010).

== Trade relations ==
In 2023, two-way trade between both nations amounted to US$303 million. Algeria's main exports to Mexico include: mineral or chemical nitrogenados; and hydraulic cements. Mexico's main exports to Algeria include: wheat and meslin, dried legumes, yeast, tubes and pipes of iron or steel, air pumps or vacuum pumps, and chemical based products.

== Resident diplomatic missions ==
- Algeria has an embassy in Mexico City.
- Mexico has an embassy in Algiers.
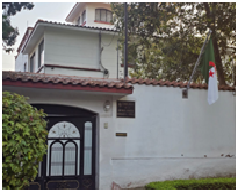
Embassy of Algeria in Mexico City

== Gallery ==
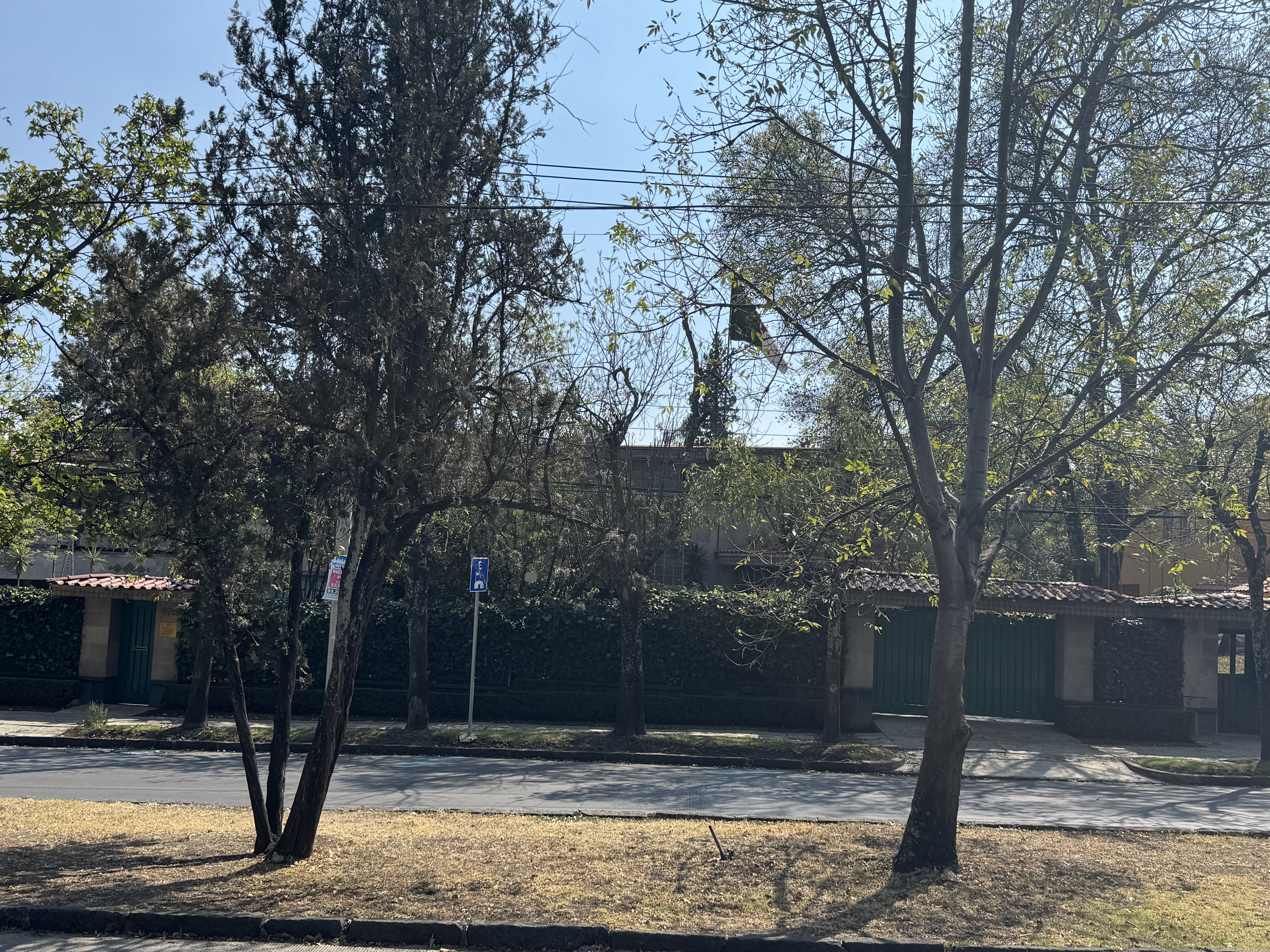
Residence of the Ambassador of Algeria in Mexico City

Algerian stamp commemorating the 1968 Summer Olympics in Mexico City
