= Agustín Arriaga Rivera =

Mexican politician (1925–2006)

Governor of Michoacán
- Preceded by: Franco Rodríguez
- Succeeded by: Carlos Gálvez Betancourt

Personal details
- Born: 20 August 1925 Pátzcuaro
- Died: 18 June 2006 (aged 80) Mexico City
- Occupation: Economist, politician

Agustín Arriaga Rivera (20 August 1925 – 18 June 2006) was a Mexican economist and politician affiliated with the Institutional Revolutionary Party (PRI) who was governor of Michoacán from 1962 to 1968.

Preceded by David Franco Rodríguez	Governor of Michoacán; 1962—1968	Succeeded by Carlos Gálvez Betancourt
