= Jesús Reyna García =

Mexican lawyer and politician (born 1952)

Governor of Michoacán (Interim)
- In office 22 April 2013 – 23 October 2013
- Preceded by: Fausto Vallejo
- Succeeded by: Fausto Vallejo

Personal details
- Born: 22 February 1952 (age 74) Huetamo, Michoacán, Mexico
- Party: PRI
- Education: UMSNH
- Profession: Lawyer and politician

José Jesús Reyna García (born 22 February 1952) is a Mexican lawyer and politician from the Institutional Revolutionary Party (PRI) who served as interim Governor of Michoacán from April to October 2013.

Reyna García sat in the Chamber of Deputies for Michoacán's 11th district during the 58th Congress (2000–2003) and as a plurinominal deputy during the 60th Congress (2006–2009).

Between April and October 2013 he acted as interim Governor of Michoacán during Governor Fausto Vallejo's absence from office for health reasons.

In April 2014 Reyna García was accused of having ties to the Knights Templar Cartel and was sent to prison for organized crime charges a month later. Guillermo Valencia Reyes, former mayor of Tepalcatepec, Michoacán, tweeted on 16 June 2014, that Governor Fausto Vallejo was using Reyna García as a scapegoat to protect his son, Rodrigo Vallejo Mora. Two days later Vallejo resigned. Reyna García was released from prison in December 2018. He was the only politician convicted after the investigations undertaken by federal commissioner Alfredo Castillo Cervantes.
