= Fausto Vallejo =

Governor of Michoacán, Mexico

Fausto Vallejo y Figueroa
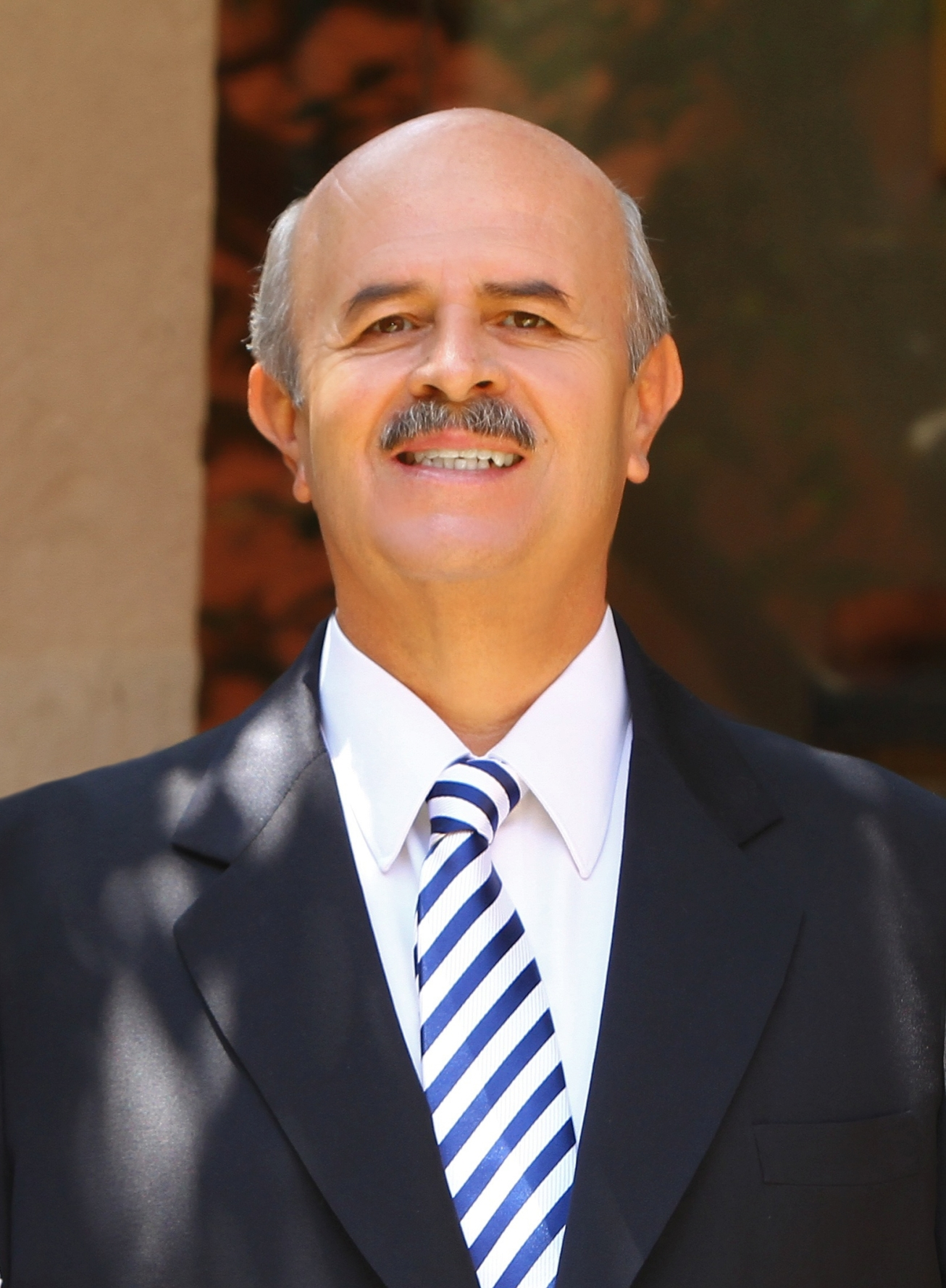

Governor of Michoacán
- In office 15 February 2012 – 19 June 2014
- Preceded by: Leonel Godoy Rangel
- Succeeded by: Salvador Jara Guerrero

Member of the Chamber of Deputies for the Michoacán′s 3rd district
- In office 1 September 1985 – 31 August 1988
- Preceded by: Raúl Lemus García
- Succeeded by: Lorenzo Martínez Gómez

Personal details
- Born: May 17, 1949 (age 77) Morelia, Michoacán
- Party: Institutional Revolutionary Party
- Education: Universidad Michoacana de San Nicolás de Hidalgo

Fausto Vallejo y Figueroa (born May 17, 1949 in Morelia, Michoacán) is a Mexican lawyer, politician, a member of the Institutional Revolutionary Party (PRI), and a former governor of Michoacán. He has served three times as mayor of Morelia, Michoacán (1994–1995, 2002–2004 and 2008–2011). On June 18, 2014, he announced he was stepping down as governor to take care of his health.

Vallejo ran for the governorship of Michoacán in the November 13, 2011 gubernatorial election. According to the official results, he won the election with 35.39% of the votes. Vallejo narrowly defeated National Action Party (PAN) gubernatorial candidate Luisa María Calderón, the sister of Mexican President Felipe Calderón, by less than 3% of the vote. Calderón, who led most opinion polls prior to the election, alleged that drug traffickers based in Michoacán had helped tip the election in Fausto Vallejo's favor. A third candidate, Silvano Aureoles of the Party of the Democratic Revolution (PRD), placed third with 29%.

Vallejo stepped down temporarily for health reasons on March 7, 2013, and Jesús Reyna García took over as interim governor. He returned to work on March 18 but participated in only two public events before asking for indefinite leave on April 9. After a liver transplant, he returned to work on October 21, 2013.

On behalf of the federal government, security commissioner Alfredo Castillo Cervantes cracked down on drug trafficking and violence. In April 2014; Reyna García was arrested for possible ties to the Knights Templar Cartel. He was convicted a month later, as Vallejo announced that he planned to ask for permission to miss work for a health check.

In August 2014, Vallejo's son Rodrigo Vallejo Mora was arrested after a video surfaced of him meeting with Servando Gómez Martínez, fugitive leader of the Knights Templar Cartel, a criminal organization based in Michoacán. Governor Vallejo stated, "[D]icen por ahí que hay videos que involucran a alguien de mi familia con los criminales. Quiero decirles que en mi familia no hay delincuentes". ("They say that there are videos that show a member of my family with criminals. I want to tell you that there are no delinquents in my family.") He resigned on June 18 for health reasons.

== See also ==
- List of municipal presidents of Morelia
