= Francisco Luna Kan =

Mexican politician (1925–2023)

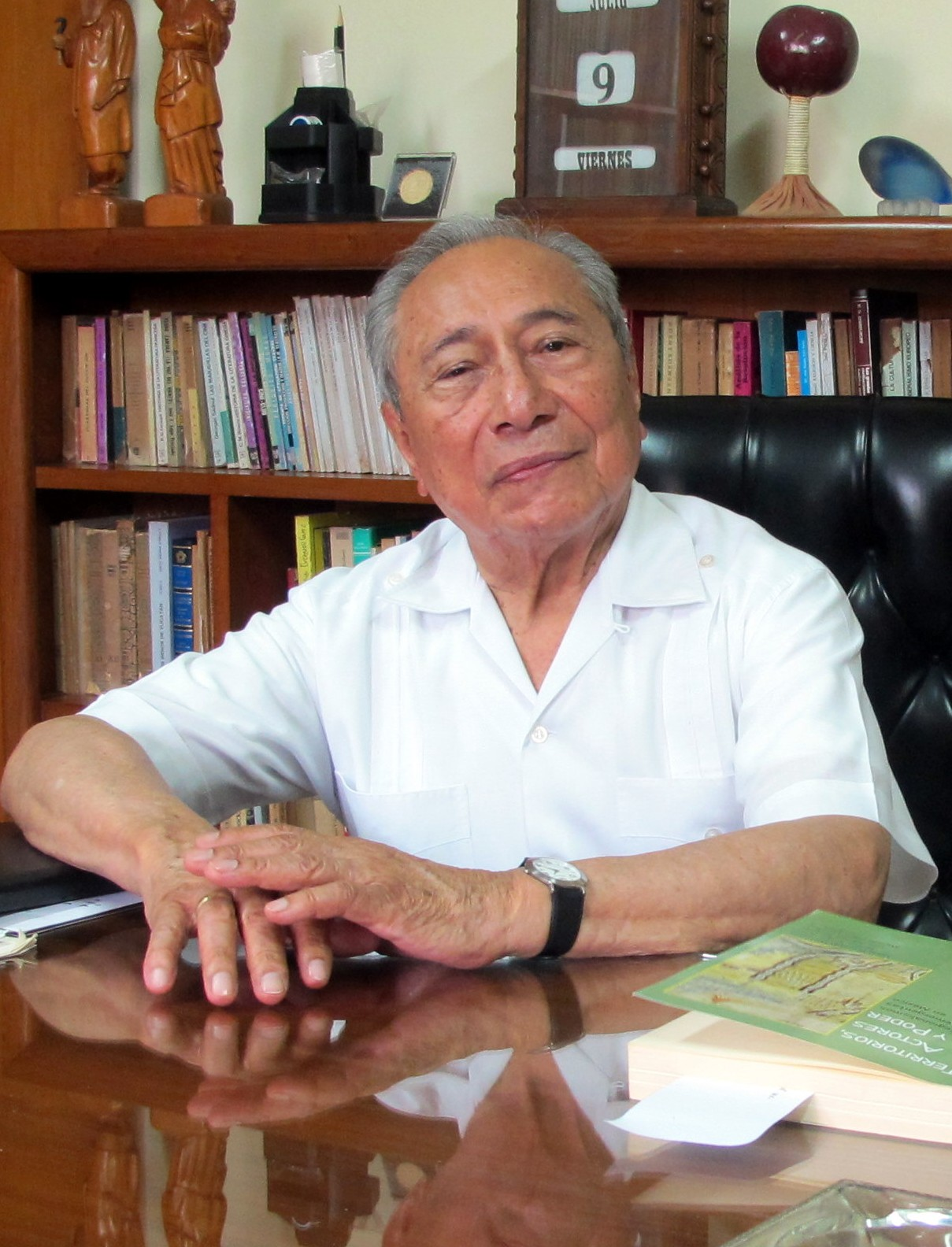
- Luna Kan in his home office in Mérida, 2010

Governor of Yucatán
- In office 1 February 1976 – 31 January 1982
- Preceded by: Carlos Loret de Mola Mediz
- Succeeded by: Graciliano Alpuche Pinzón

Member of the Chamber of Deputies for Yucatán's 3rd district
- In office 1 September 1964 – 31 August 1967
- Preceded by: Carlos Loret de Mola Mediz
- Succeeded by: Víctor Manzanilla Schaffer

Personal details
- Born: 3 December 1925 Mérida, Yucatán, Mexico
- Died: 23 November 2023 (aged 97) Mérida, Yucatán, Mexico
- Party: Institutional Revolutionary Party, Party of the Democratic Revolution
- Spouse: Gloria Soria Vera (m. 1956; died 2022)
- Children: 3
- Education: IPN

Francisco Epigmenio Luna Kan (3 December 1925 – 23 November 2023) was a Mexican politician who served as the Governor of Yucatán from 1976 to 1982.

== Biography ==
Francisco Epigmenio Luna Kan was born on 3 December 1925 in the town of Noc Ac in the municipality of Mérida. He was the son of Jerónimo Luna Ramírez and Luciana Kan. Luna Kan received his primary and secondary education in Mérida, and studied for two years at the Escuela Normal Rural in Hecelchakán, Campeche. He earned his medical degree from the National Polytechnic Institute's Higher School of Rural Medicine, writing his thesis on epidemiology and social characteristics of tubercular patients, before earning a master's degree in health sciences. Luna Kan was a practicing doctor of medicine then taught as a Professor of Medicine before first obtaining political office, at first being overseer of the state's rural medical system.

Luna Kan was the first person of pure Maya ancestry to govern the state since the Spanish conquest of Yucatán. (In the early 1920s, Felipe Carrillo Puerto, who was partly Maya, had been governor.) For centuries the political elite had been Criollos (Yucatecans of pure Spanish ancestry). It was widely said that party officials of Mexico's ruling Institutional Revolutionary Party (PRI) took the unusual step of selecting a person of Maya descent as their candidate in 1975 because the opposition National Action Party (PAN) had been getting many votes in Yucatán, and PRI candidates had been getting a poor showing in the state's predominantly Maya towns and villages. It was said that PAN got the majority of votes in the previous governor's race, and the PRI managed to maintain control of the state only through fraud in counting votes. During his governorship, he reopened the Teatro Peón Contreras.

After his term as governor Luna Kan resigned from the PRI and joined the Party of the Democratic Revolution (PRD). He unsuccessfully ran as that party's candidate for municipal president of Mérida in 1998. Francisco Luna Kan held a seat in the federal Chamber of Deputies as a PRD deputy for Yucatán.

Luna Kan married Gloria María Soria Vega on 15 January 1956. They were married until her death in 2022. They had three children: Gloria Luz de Peraza, Francisco, and Juan José Luna Soria. Luna Kan died on 23 November 2023, at the age of 97. His cause of death was not made public. Tributes came from multiple public figures, including former governor Dulce María Sauri Riancho and the then-gubernatiorial candidate Joaquín Díaz Mena.

Preceded by Carlos Loret de Mola Mediz	Governor of Yucatán; 1976–1982	Succeeded by Graciliano Alpuche Pinzón
