= Salvador Jara Guerrero =

Mexican philosopher, physician and professor

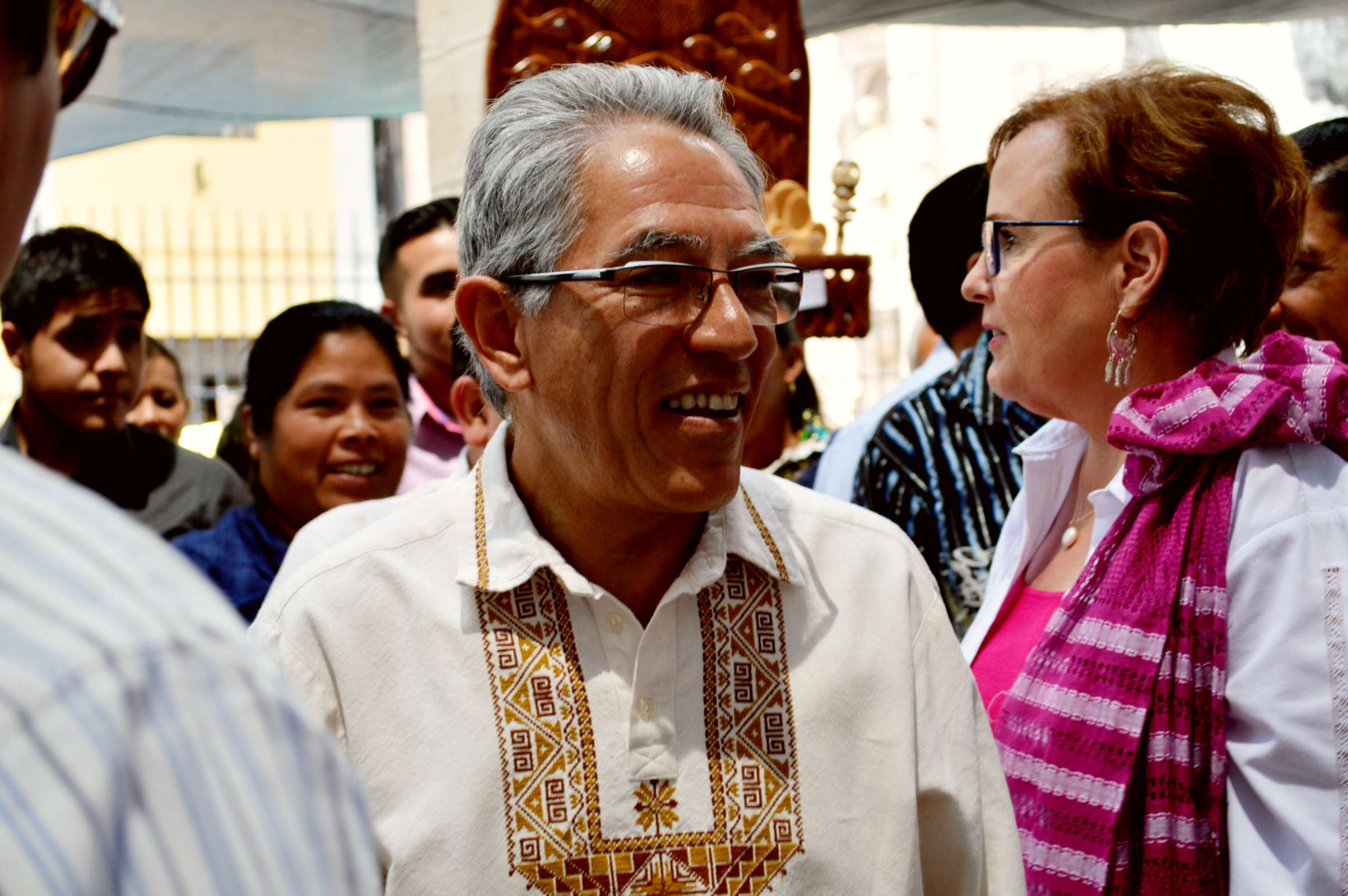

Governor of Michoacán
- In office 20 June 2014 – 30 September 2015
- Preceded by: Fausto Vallejo
- Succeeded by: Silvano Aureoles Conejo

Personal details
- Born: 14 October 1955 (age 70) Morelia, Michoacán, Mexico
- Party: PRI
- Education: National Autonomous University of Mexico; Universidad Michoacana de San Nicolás de Hidalgo
- Profession: Philosopher, physicist and professor

Salvador Jara Guerrero (born 14 October 1955) is a Mexican philosopher, physicist and professor. He served as Substitute Governor of Michoacán (PRI] beginning on 20 June 2014, following the resignation of Fausto Vallejo.

Jara Guerrero was rector of the Universidad Michoacana de San Nicolás de Hidalgo from 2011 until 2014.

Salvador Jara once described himself as apolitical, but after his term as governor he became a key member of PRI in Michoacan. From September 2019 to 2020, he was a member of PRI's Permanent Political Commission of the National Political Council and one of seven national advisors of the National Revolutionary Association "Gral. Leandro Valle". During the presidency of Enrique Peña Nieto, Jara was an official of the Secretariat of Public Education (SEP).

| Preceded by Fausto Vallejo | Governor of Michoacán; 2014 — 2015 | Succeeded by Silvano Aureoles Conejo |
