= Ilana Sod =

Mexican journalist

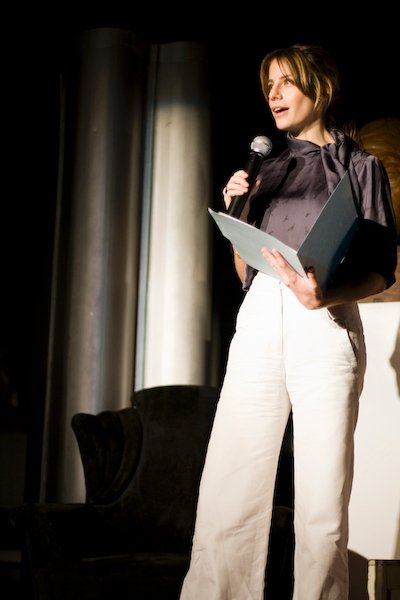
- Born: February 3, 1973 (age 53); Mexico City
- Occupations: TV presenter, journalist and & producer

Ilana Sod (born February 3, 1973) is a Mexican television and radio journalist, presenter, and producer. She has worked for a variety of media outlets and collaborated on initiatives relating to social issues and youth-oriented programming.

== Career ==
From 2004 to 2012, Ilana Sod was MTV Latin America's newscaster and Editor-in-Chief for Public Affairs Programming. She was previously a columnist for the Mexican newspaper Excélsior and a contributor to Radio Trece in the Mexico City area.

Sod was born in Mexico City and splits her time between residences in Los Angeles and her home in Mexico. She continues to be a recurring contributor for MTV and multiple media outlets throughout the Spanish-speaking world. The 2014 TV news Special "Hecho en America" which Sod co-produced with Manuel Alvarez, for NBCUniversal's mun2 Channel has been nominated or shortlisted for several prestigious awards, including a 2014 nomination for a Daytime Emmy in the Outstanding Special Class Special. "Hecho en America" won the Gold Award at the 2014 WorldMediaFestival – global competition for modern media. "Hecho en America" was executive produced by Gloria Medel Solomons.

=== Agents of Change ===
She is the host and producer of "Agents of Change" (Agentes de Cambio) - a project initially sponsored by the Government of Finland, through the Inter-American Development Bank, for MTV that reports on ideas and people that affect positive change throughout Latin America and the World.

Agents of Change seeks to empower and inspire its audience to take action, make a difference and launch new youth-led initiatives. Dedicated micro sites and social media pages on Facebook and Twitter assist with these goals; to date, there have been 20 long-format shows and over 90 short-form capsules to promote the program.

Agents of Change also works as an incubator of change. Through a partnership with Ashoka, the global association of leading social entrepreneurs, the initiative has raised over $2.5 million to launch over 500 Agents of Change teams in the U.S. and 22 countries in Latin America.

Since its inception, in 2005, Sod and the team behind this ground-breaking program, have managed to grow the project's scope and reach by soliciting and obtaining the support of many other sponsors and supporters to the Project such as: The World Bank, Ashoka: Innovators for the Public, and UNICEF

Agents of Change is an ongoing production that has taken Sod to places throughout the world. Sod has reported from Argentina, Chile, Guatemala, Italy, Kenya, and many other places.

"Agents of Change" (Agentes de Cambio) Documentary Series - Selected Highlights

- Agents of Change, Season One, 2005. "Environment, Nature, Music & Tech" First part of the Documentary Series funded by the Inter-American Development Bank featuring stories from Argentina, Bolivia, Chile, Colombia, Guatemala, México and Panamá.
- Agents of Change, Season Four, 2008. "Social Inclusion throughout Sports", stories from Spain, Brazil, Mexico and Argentina. Funded by Nike Foundation. (December 2008).
- Agents of Change, Season Five, 2009. "Science supporting Labor Opportunities", stories from USA, Israel and Colombia. Funded by the Organization of American States (April).
- Agents of Change, Season Six, 2010."Global Warming". This part of the series documents projects from France, USA, Argentina and Mexico. Funded by Ashoka Foundation and the Staples Foundation for Learning.
- Agents of Change, Season nine 2013. HIV / AIDS and Social Change initiative in 52 Countries. Video highlight.

The First Season of "Agents of Change" received Awarded by The Intermedia World Media Fest for her work on the series "Xpress" produced by MTV Brazil about the female homicides in Ciudad Juárez, México. Best Educational Documentary (April 2008).

=== Television ===
Sod worked as network TV news anchor for Canal 40 and Canal 22; she also reported for Sky News Australia, where she covered local Social and health topics such as the HIV/AIDS epidemic in the Australian capital.

In August 2003, she co-produced for MTV the PSA campaign Grita (Speak Out!), whose goal was to empower young people and children to be more communicative about their sexuality. This series of spots were widely recognised for their effectiveness at helping bring positive change and awareness of these issues to the forefront in Latin America, earning Sod and the series wide recognition in Latin America for their efforts as well as multiple awards including the PromaxBDA Golden Award as best pro-social campaign of a TV station in Latin America.

More than a year later, as a follow-up to Grita, a new update on the series, produced for CNN and MTV, had her reporting on the views, thoughts, and feelings of Latin American youth regarding machismo and how this cultural attitude increases the risk of exposure to HIV/AIDS for women in the region. The 30-minute special premiered on CNN International on November 27, 2004 and was re-broadcast a few days later by MTV around the globe during World AIDS Day, on December 1 of that year. Sod's reports for the global broadcast by MTV focused covering on the epidemic with emphasis on how it affected Argentina, Colombia and Mexico.

In May and June 2006, Sod earned additional recognition for her efforts to give a voice to the Mexican youth during the key presidential election of that year. In a Mexican television first, she accepted questions from Mexican youth and then interviewed all five presidential candidates a month before the election. The Somos 30 Millones (We Are 30 Million) series, named after the number of Mexicans under the age of 35, included interviews with Felipe Calderón, Roberto Rafael Campa Cifrián, Andrés Manuel López Obrador, Roberto Madrazo Pintado, and Dora Patricia Mercado Castro.

Later, in August of that year, she was MTV International's correspondent and UNICEF's moderator during the XVI International AIDS Conference, 2006 in Toronto. As part of MTV's AIDS-awareness initiative, Staying Alive, Sod's contributions appeared at the "48 Fest" special vlog and a session titled From Rhetoric to Action: Defining a Stronger Role for Youth in National HIV/AIDS Policies.

=== Radio ===
Between 1996 and 2003, Sod worked for Radioactivo 98.5 in Mexico City, where she hosted a daily show titled "Retroactivo". At Radioactivo, she hosted a show Additionally, between 1999 and 2001, she coordinated the Radio Sex Project, 48 hours of investigative reports about sex. She also hosted and reported for various Radioactivo programs. After Radioactivo's closure, she covered the Iraq War in 2008 as a correspondent based in Jerusalem and Tel Aviv for Grupo Imagen. She later departed Imagen to contribute to Javier Solórzano's news program on Radio Trece with a segment entitled Amplio Espectro (Wide Spectrum).

In 2018, Ilana Sod joined the launch team of Aire Libre, a new radio station run by the former director of Radioactivo.
