= Porfirio Muñoz Ledo =

Mexican politician (1933–2023)

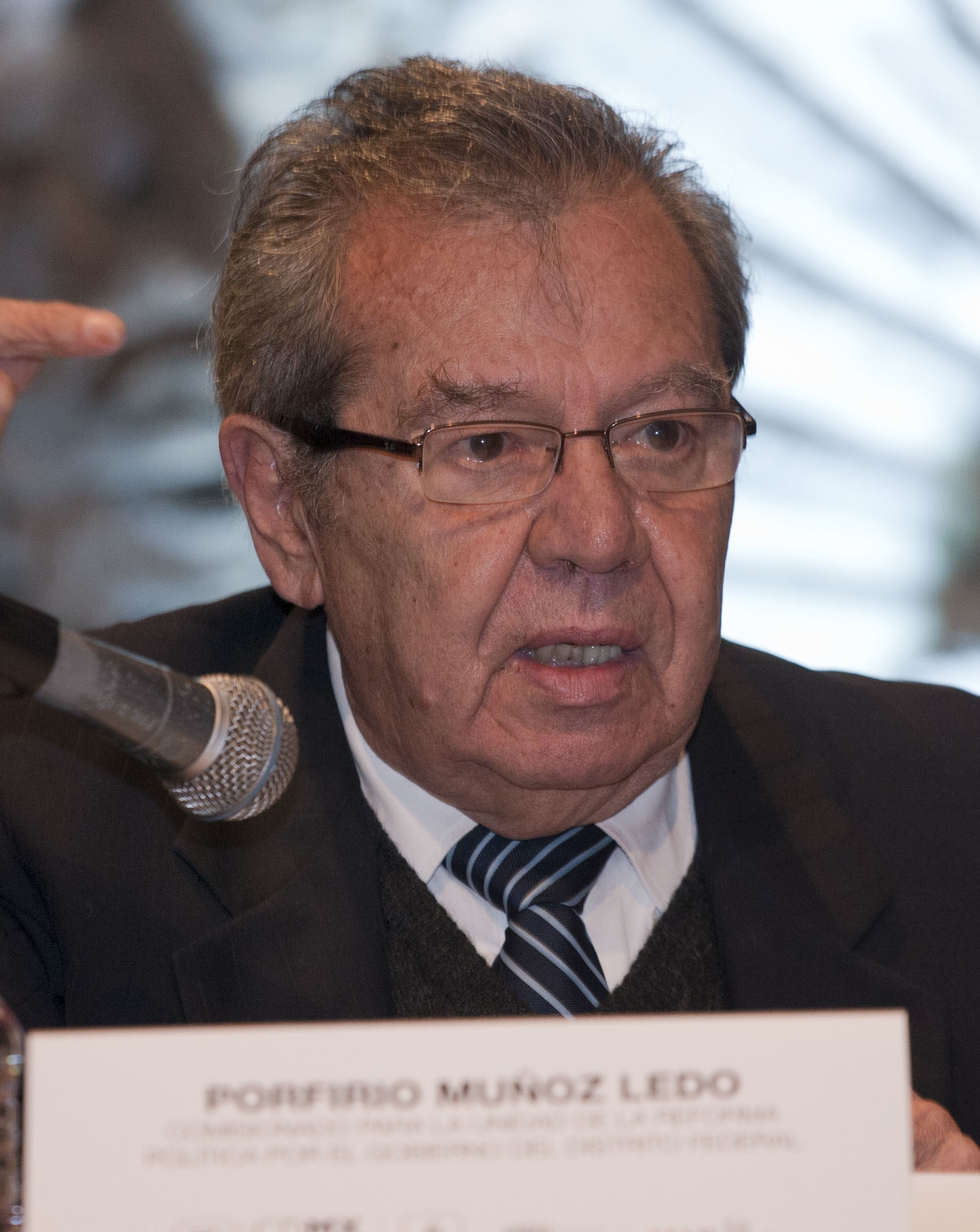
- Muñoz Ledo in 2015

President of the Chamber of Deputies
- In office 1 September 2018 – 5 September 2019
- Preceded by: Edgar Romo García
- Succeeded by: Laura Rojas Hernández
- In office 1 September 1997 – 30 September 1997
- Preceded by: Netzahualcóyotl de la Vega
- Succeeded by: Eduardo Bernal Martínez

Secretary of Public Education
- In office 1 December 1976 – 9 December 1977
- President: José López Portillo
- Preceded by: Víctor Bravo Ahuja
- Succeeded by: Fernando Solana Morales

Secretary of Labor and Social Welfare
- In office 17 September 1972 – 25 September 1975
- President: Luis Echeverría Álvarez
- Preceded by: Rafael Hernández Ochoa
- Succeeded by: Carlos Gálvez Betancourt

Personal details
- Born: Porfirio Alejandro Muñoz Ledo y Lazo de la Vega; 23 July 1933 Mexico City, D.F., Mexico
- Died: 9 July 2023 (aged 89) Mexico City, Mexico
- Party: Morena (2018–2023)
- Other political affiliations: Institutional Revolutionary Party (1954–1987); Party of the Democratic Revolution (1989–1999); Authentic Party of the Mexican Revolution (1999–2000); Independent (2000–2006); Labor Party (2006–2018)
- Spouse(s): Marie Hélène Chevannier (m. 1960; div. 1971) Berta Yáñez Centeno Cabrera (m. 1973; div. 1996) Mariana Sáiz Velázquez (m. 1998; div. 2006)
- Children: 5
- Parent(s): Porfirio Muñoz Ledo Castillo; Ana Lazo de la Vega Marín
- Education: National Autonomous University of Mexico (LLB); University of Paris (SJD)

Porfirio Alejandro Muñoz Ledo y Lazo de la Vega (23 July 1933 – 9 July 2023) was a Mexican politician. He was one of the founders of the Party of the Democratic Revolution (PRD), and served as Ambassador to Cuba from January 2022 until his death.

== Biography ==
Born in Mexico City, Muñoz Ledo studied law at the National Autonomous University of Mexico (UNAM) from 1951 to 1955 and later pursued graduate studies at the University of Paris.

Muñoz Ledo served as a member of the cabinets of Presidents Luis Echeverría as Secretary of Labor (1972–1975) and José López Portillo as Secretary of Education (1976–1977). He was President of the Institutional Revolutionary Party (PRI) during the presidential campaign of 1975–1976.

Muñoz Ledo was Mexico's Permanent Representative to the United Nations from 1978 to 1985, where he presided over the UN Security Council, the Group of 77 and the negotiations of the Global Economic Agreements.

In 1988 he broke with the PRI and won a seat in the Senate running as a candidate for the leftist Frente Democrático Nacional (FDN) coalition. On 5 May 1989, Muñoz Ledo, Cuauhtémoc Cárdenas, and other leading center-left and leftist politicians formally founded the Party of the Democratic Revolution (PRD).

Muñoz Ledo served in the Chamber of Deputies from 1997 to 1999. He was the first member of an opposition party to preside over Congress in the post-revolutionary period as President of the Chamber of Deputies in 1997. He ran for the presidency in 2000 as the Authentic Party of the Mexican Revolution candidate but before the elections he gave his support to the National Action Party candidate Vicente Fox who later designated Muñoz Ledo ambassador to the European Union (2001–2004).

In 2005 he returned to the PRD to join Andrés Manuel López Obrador in his presidential campaign.

In 2009 until 2012, he again served in the Chamber of Deputies as a deputy for the PT.

On 27 August 2018, the parliamentary group of the National Regeneration Movement (MORENA) proposed him as president of the Chamber of Deputies and therefore of the Congress of the Union for the first year of the LXIV Legislature.

In late 2020, he ran for president of the MORENA party, but came in second place. In January 2022, he was appointed Ambassador to Cuba.

Muñoz Ledo died on 9 July 2023, at the age of 89. The cause of his death was not immediately announced.

Preceded by Víctor Bravo Ahuja	Secretary of Education; 1976–1977	Succeeded by Fernando Solana
Preceded by Jesús Reyes Heroles	President of the Institutional Revolutionary Party; 1975—1976	Succeeded by Carlos Sansores Pérez
Preceded by Roberto Robles Garnica	President of the Party of the Democratic Revolution; 1993—1996	Succeeded by Andrés Manuel López Obrador
