= Servando Chávez Hernández =

Mexican politician

Governor of Michoacán
- In office 1 December 1970 – 14 February 1974
- Preceded by: Carlos Gálvez Betancourt
- Succeeded by: Carlos Torres Manzo

Deputy of the Congress of the Union for the 7th district of Michoacán
- In office 1 September 1964 – 31 August 1967
- Preceded by: Eligio Aguilar Ortíz
- Succeeded by: Norberto Mora Plancarte

Personal details
- Born: 23 October 1936 San Lucas, Michoacán, Mexico
- Died: 11 November 2014 (aged 78) Guadalajara, Jalisco, Mexico
- Party: PRI
- Profession: Lawyer and politician

José Servando Chávez Hernández (23 October 1936 – 11 November 2014) was a Mexican lawyer and politician from the Institutional Revolutionary Party who served as Governor of Michoacán from 1970 to 1974. He also served as Deputy of the Chamber of Deputies of Mexico from 1964 to 1967.

Preceded by Carlos Gálvez Betancourt	Governor of Michoacán; 1970 — 1974	Succeeded by Carlos Torres Manzo
