= Eugenio Méndez Docurro =

Mexican engineer and politician

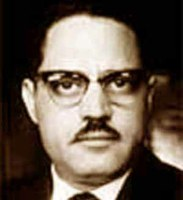

Eugenio Méndez Docurro (April 17, 1923 – August 23, 2015) was a Mexican engineer and politician. He served as the Secretary of Communications and Transportation from 1970 to 1976 during the administration of former President Luis Echeverría. He also served as the director of the Instituto Politécnico Nacional (IPN) from 1959 until 1962, as well as the first director of the Consejo Nacional de Ciencia y Tecnología (CONACYT) upon its creation on December 29, 1970.

Méndez Docurro was born in Veracruz in 1923. He studied at the Escuela Superior de Ingeniería Mecánica y Eléctrica (ESIME). He received a Masters of Science from Harvard University and the electronics laboratory at the University of Paris.

He died in Mexico City on August 23, 2015, at the age of 92.

== See also ==
- CONACYT
