= Carlos Loret de Mola Mediz =

Mexican politician and journalist

Carlos Loret de Mola

Governor of Yucatán
- In office February 1, 1970 – January 31, 1976
- Preceded by: Luis Torres Mesías
- Succeeded by: Francisco Luna

Personal details
- Born: July 30, 1921 Mérida, Yucatán
- Died: February 7, 1986 (aged 64) Guerrero
- Party: Institutional Revolutionary Party
- Spouse: Berta Vadillo Martínez

Carlos Loret de Mola Mediz (July 30, 1921, in Mérida, Yucatán – February 7, 1986, in Guerrero) was a Mexican politician and journalist, a member of the Institutional Revolutionary Party, and deputy, senator and Governor of Yucatán. His father, Carlos Loret de Mola Medina, was a railroad worker, and his mother, Loreto Mediz Bolio, was a sister of the poet Antonio Mediz Bolio.

== Career ==
Carlos Loret de Mola was elected governor in 1970 after an election against the candidate of the PAN, Víctor Correa Rachó, who questioned the election results but finally had a good relationship with Loret de Mola. During his government he faced several times President Luis Echeverría, the Governor of Campeche, Carlos Sansores Pérez and the political leader in Yucatán, Víctor Cervera. The killing of a labor lawyer and independent trade union leader, Efrain Calderón Lara (a) "El Charras", accused police officers contaminated by the Governor of Campeche, Sansores Pérez shook his government while his six-year term was finished even with the recognition of those who had been their adversaries. Read what he said in Diario de Yucatán who questioned him at the beginning of his administration. He subsequently continued his journalistic career. During this period he was faced with some characters of political power by their complaints about crime and corruption. Officially Carlos Loret de Mola lost his life in an accident in automobile in Guerrero, but his son, Rafael Loret de Mola, has always maintained that he was killed with an abundance of evidence that had no judicial follow-up for political reasons.

Carlos Loret de Mola was a journalist who wrote and directed several newspapers in various parts of the country, especially in Guanajuato and Chihuahua, enjoying broad recognition and prestige. Two members of his family continued their profession: his son, journalist and writer Rafael Loret de Mola, one of the toughest critics of the Mexican political system, and his grandson and son of Rafael, the television journalist Carlos Loret de Mola. Among his books are: Ángel sin Ojos, Yucatán en la Patria, Manuel Cepeda Peraza Soldado y Estadista de la República, Confesiones de un Gobernador, Los Últimos 91 Días, Los Caciques, Mil Días de Quetzalcóatl, El Juicio y su obra póstuma and Que la Nación me lo Demande.

== See also ==
- Governor of Yucatán

| Preceded by Luis Torres Mesías | Governor of Yucatán; 1970—1976 | Succeeded by Francisco Luna |
