= Rafael Hernández Ochoa =

Mexican politician and lawyer (1915–1990)

Rafael Hernández Ocho

Governor of Veracruz
- In office December 1, 1974 – November 30, 1980
- Preceded by: Rafael Murillo Vidal
- Succeeded by: Agustín Acosta Lagunes

Secretary of Labor and Social Welfare
- In office 1 December 1970 – 15 September 1972
- President: Luis Echeverría Álvarez
- Preceded by: Salomón González Blanco
- Succeeded by: Porfirio Muñoz Ledo

Personal details
- Born: June 4, 1915; Santa Gertrudis, Veracruz
- Died: May 18, 1990 (aged 74)
- Political party: Institutional Revolutionary Party
- Profession: Lawyer

Rafael Hernández Ochoa (June 4, 1915 – May 18, 1990) was a Mexican politician and lawyer, Governor of Veracruz, from 1 December 1974 to 30 November 1980.

== Biography ==
He was born in Santa Gertrudis, in municipality of Vega de Alatorre, Veracruz, on June 4, 1915. He completed his primary education at the Escuela Enrique C. Rébsamen and graduated high school and college at the Escuela de Bachilleres in Xalapa city.

From 1938 to 1941 studied law at the Faculty of Law and Political Science of the Universidad Nacional Autónoma de México, obtaining a professional degree in the year 1944 with a thesis entitled "La Intervención del Estado" (State Intervention).

He was President of the National Livestock Confederation and Head of the Legal Department of the Veracruz state government. From 1958 to 1970 he worked in the Interior Ministry and occupied various positions as Deputy Assistant Secretary, Deputy Director of Administration, Director General of Property Control, Director General of Political and Social Research and Assistant Secretary of the Interior. During the time he was an official of the Secretariat participated in different events on migration and tourism both abroad and inside the country, and served as a member of the National Council of Tourism.

From 1 December 1970 to 1973 he served as the Secretary of Labor of Mexico. On May 4, 1974, he was elected under the Institutional Revolutionary Party to serve as Governor of Veracruz and took office on December 1 of that year, serving until 30 November 1980. During his two terms, Ochoa is credited with restructuring the entire Veracruz state university system and transformed old arts training schools into official departments of universities. He died on May 18, 1990.

== See also ==
- 1974, Veracruz state election
- Cabinet of Luis Echevería
