= Manuel Velasco Suárez =

Mexican politician

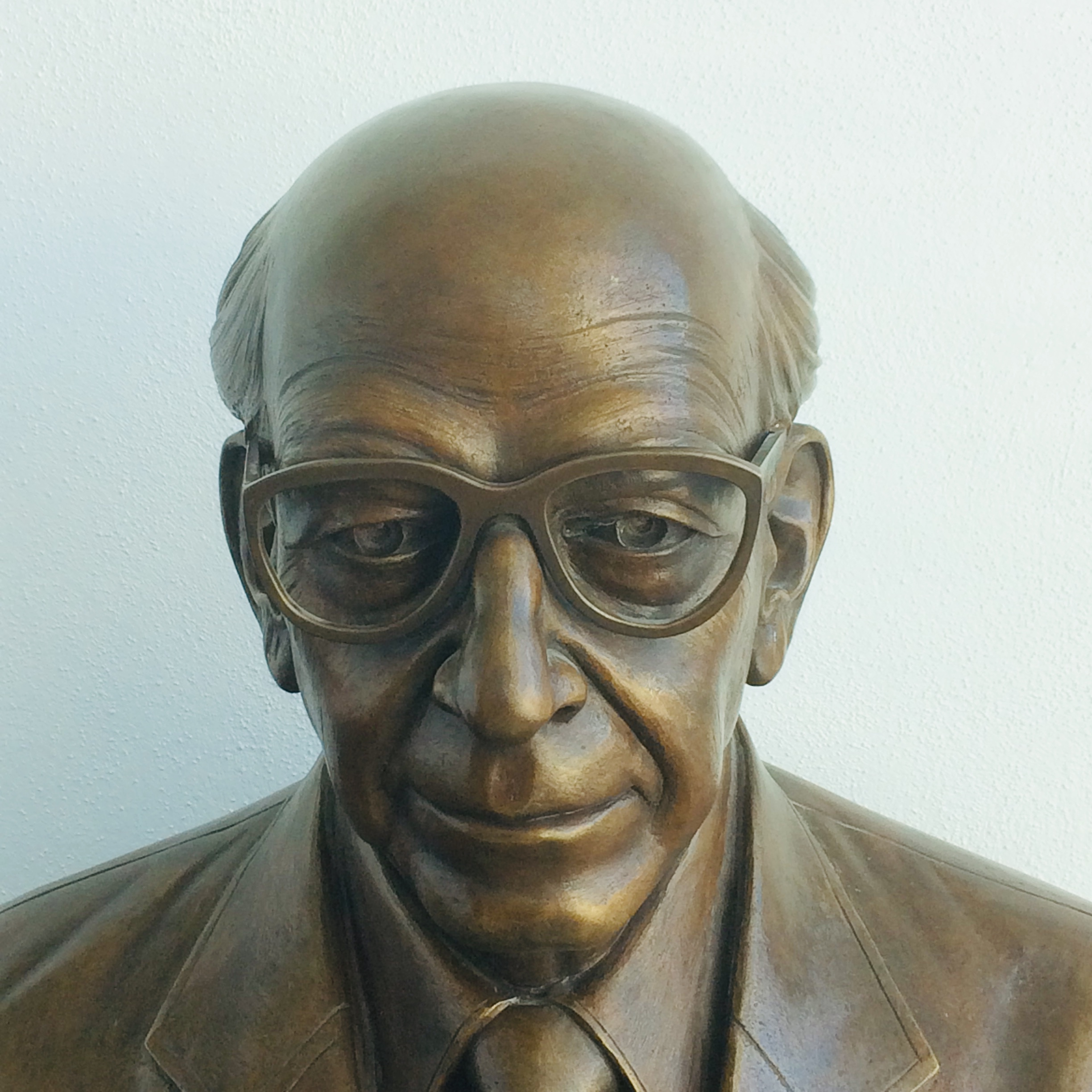
- Bust of Manuel Velasco Suárez

Governor of Chiapas
- In office 1 December 1970 – 30 November 1976
- Preceded by: José Castillo Tielemans
- Succeeded by: Jorge de la Vega Domínguez

Personal details
- Born: 28 December 1914 San Cristóbal de las Casas, Chiapas, Mexico
- Died: 2 December 2001 (aged 87) Mexico City
- Party: PRI
- Spouse: Elvira Siles
- Profession: Neurosurgeon

Manuel Velasco Suárez (28 December 1914 – 2 December 2001) was a Mexican neurologist, neurosurgeon, scientist and humanist. He became governor of the state of Chiapas.

== Career ==
Velasco was born in San Cristóbal de las Casas, Chiapas, in 1914. He founded and was the first director of National Institute of Neurology and Neurosurgery (INNN), which today bears his name and of which he was its first director. In 1977, he was appointed director emeritus and honorary member of the Governing Board of the Institute until his death in December 2001.

He created the chair of neurology and neurosurgery at the Faculty of Medicine of the National Autonomous University of Mexico (UNAM) and in 1989, that university named him Emeritus Professor and distinguished him with the Academic Merit Medal for having taught classes for more than 60 years.

He participated in the founding of the National Bioethics Commission in 1992 and the Mexican National Academy of Bioethics.

He promoted the closure of inhumane asylums, introduced neuropsychiatry, and in 1948 promoted services for mentally ill patients of the brain and nervous system at the Hospital Juárez de México (then known as Hospital de San Pablo) and later in the creation of seven regional hospitals.

He was a scientist, humanist, pacifist and creator of institutions. As a humanist, he participated in the struggles against the proliferation of nuclear and chemical weapons and within these efforts he was the Hispanic American leader of the International Physicians for the Prevention of Nuclear War, an association that in 1985 received the Nobel Peace Prize.

He led neurology, mental health and rehabilitation of the Mexican Ministry of Health and Public Assistance in 1958.

He became a politician affiliated with the Institutional Revolutionary Party (PRI) and served as governor of Chiapas from 1970 to 1976.

His grandson, Manuel Velasco Coello, also became governor of Chiapas.

Preceded by José Castillo Tielemans	Governor of Chiapas; 1970 – 1976	Succeeded by Jorge de la Vega Domínguez
