= Governor of Michoacán =

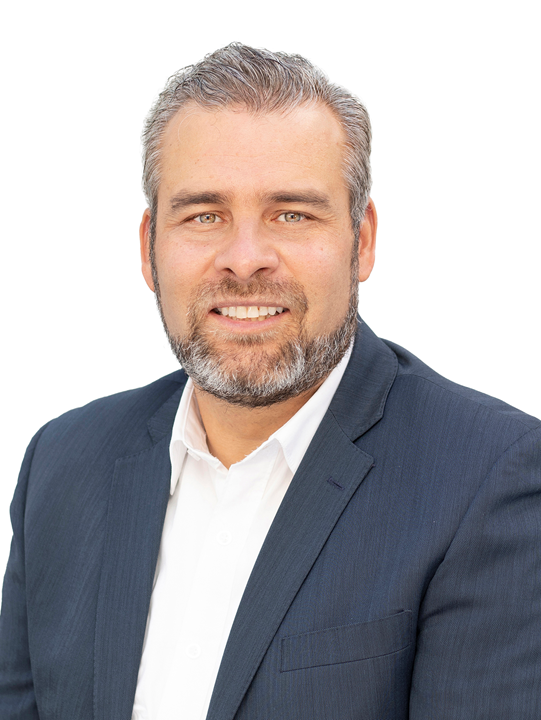
- Incumbent; Alfredo Ramírez Bedolla since October 1, 2021
- Term length: Six years, non-renewable.

The Governor of Michoacán is the head of the executive branch of the State of Michoacán in Mexico. According to the Political Constitution of the Free and Sovereign State of Michoacán de Ocampo, the exercise of the executive power is deposited in a single individual with the title of Constitutional Governor of the Free and Sovereign State of Michoacán de Ocampo, who is elected for a period of 6 years without any possibility of re-election. The governor's term of service begins February 15 of the year of the election and finishes on the next February 14 after having passed six years.

The state of Michoacán was created in 1824, being one of the original states of the federation, thus it has existed through all systems of government effective in Mexico, as much the federal system as the central system, which is the reason the denomination of the organization has varied between state and department.

The individuals that have occupied the Governorship of the State of Michoacán, in their different denominations, since its inception are listed below.

== List of governors of the state of Michoacán ==
- (1825): Antonio Castro
- (1829–1830): José Trinidad Salgado
- (1830–1833): Diego Moreno Jasso
- (1836–1841): José Ignacio Álvarez
- (1837): Onofre Calvo Pintado
- (1837): Vicente Sosa
- (1842–1843): José Ignacio Álvarez
- (1844): Juan Manuel Olmos
- (1844–1846): José de Ugarte
- (1847): Melchor Ocampo
- (1852): Francisco Silva
- (1853): José de Ugarte
- (1854): Anastasio Torrejón
- (1853): José María Manzo
- (1856): Miguel Silva
- (1856): Gregorio Ceballos
- (1857): Santos Degollado
- (1858-1862): Epitacio Huerta
- (1862-1863): Antonio Huerta
- (1863-1864): Felipe Berriozábal
- (1864–1865): Carlos Salazar Ruiz
- (1865): Vicente Riva Palacio
- (1867): Justo Mendoza
- (1867): Rafael Carrillo
- (1876–1891): Mariano Jiménez
- (1891): Epifanio Reyes.
- (1891–1911): Aristeo Mercado
- (1911–1911): Felipe de Jesús Tena
- (1912–1912): Miguel Silva
- (1912–1912): Dr. Ángel Carreón y Ochoa Garibay
- (1913–1915): Gertrudis Sánchez
- (1915–1917): Alfredo Elizondo
- (1917): José Rentería Luviano
- (1917): Pascual Ortiz Rubio
- (1918): Porfirio García de León
- (1919): Francisco Ortiz Rubio
- (1920): Rafael Álvarez
- (1920): Francisco José Múgica
- (1920): Celerino Luviano
- (1920): José Rentería Luviano
- (1921): Primo Serranía Mercado
- (1921): Jesús Magaña Soto
- (1921): Silvestre Guerrero
- (1922–1924): Sidronio Sánchez Pineda
- (1924–1928): Enrique Ramírez Aviña
- (1928–1929): Lázaro Cárdenas
- (1929–1930): Dámaso Cárdenas del Río
- (1930): Lázaro Cárdenas
- (1930–1931): Gabino Vázquez
- (1931–1932): Lázaro Cárdenas
- (1932–1934): Benigno Serrato
- (1934–1935): Rafael Sánchez Tapia
- (1936–1936): Rafael Ordorica
- (1936–1939): Gildardo Magaña
- (1939): Arnulfo Avila
- (1939–1940): Conrado Magaña
- (1940–1944): Félix Ireta Viveros
- (1944–1949): José María Mendoza Pardo
- (1949–1950): Daniel T. Rentería
- (1950–1956): Dámaso Cárdenas del Río
- (1956–1962): David Franco Rodríguez
- (1962–1968): Agustín Arriaga
- (1968–1970): Carlos Gálvez Betancourt
- (1970–1974): Servando Chávez Hernández
- (1974–1980): Carlos Torres Manzo
- (1980–1986): Cuauhtémoc Cárdenas
- (1986–1988): Luis Martínez Villicaña
- (1988–1992): Genovevo Figueroa Zamudio
- (1992): Eduardo Villaseñor Peña
- (1992–1996): Ausencio Chávez Hernández
- (1996–2002): Víctor Manuel Tinoco
- (2002–2008): Lázaro Cárdenas Batel
- (2008–2012): Leonel Godoy
- (2012–2013): Fausto Vallejo
- (2013): Jesús Reyna García (Interim)
- (2013–2014): Fausto Vallejo
- (2014–2015): Salvador Jara Guerrero (Substitute)
- (2015–2021): Silvano Aureoles Conejo
- (2021–): Alfredo Ramírez Bedolla

== See also ==
- List of Mexican governors
