= Alfredo Valdés Montoya =

Governor of Sinaloa

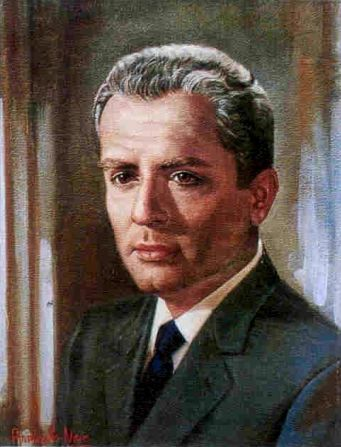
- Portrait of Alfredo Valdés Montoya

Governor of Sinaloa
- In office January 1, 1969 – December 31, 1974
- Preceded by: Leopoldo Sánchez Celis
- Succeeded by: Alfonso G. Calderón

Personal details
- Born: Alfredo Valdés Montoya; February 14, 1920 Ahome, Sinaloa
- Died: February 14, 2014 (aged 94) Culiacán, Sinaloa
- Spouse: Judith Gaxiola
- Children: Mara, Judith, Alfredo and Alfonso
- Parent(s): Rosalino Valdés; Felícitas Montoya

Alfredo Valdés Montoya (14 February 1920 - 14 February 2014) was a Mexican politician who was governor of Sinaloa from 1969 to 1974. He was born on February 14, 1920, in Villa de Ahome, Sinaloa. He studied a Bachelor's Degree in Economics at the University of Guadalajara. He then worked in the federal Treasury Department. He developed the industrial and urban planning scheme of Mazatlán, Culiacán, Guasave and Ahome. He gave the communities in the highlands paved roads and complete school services. During his governorship, Sinaloa then achieved an annual growth rate of 7.5 percent, far exceeding the national growth rate. He married Judith Gaxiola and had 4 children, Mara, Judith, Alfredo and Alfonso. He died in Culiacán on his 94th birthday of a heart attack. A day later, a body ceremony was held in the central courtyard of the Government Palace, attended by several politicians and former governors.
