= Óscar Flores Sánchez =

Mexican politician

Attorney General of Mexico
- In office December 1, 1976 – November 30, 1982
- President: José López Portillo
- Preceded by: Pedro Ojeda Paullada
- Succeeded by: Sergio García Ramírez

Governor of Chihuahua
- In office October 4, 1968 – October 3, 1974
- Preceded by: Práxedes Giner Durán
- Succeeded by: Manuel Bernardo Aguirre

Senator for Chihuahua
- In office 1952–1958
- Preceded by: Alfredo Chávez
- Succeeded by: Tomás Valles Vivar

Personal details
- Born: June 22, 1907 Ciudad Juárez, Chihuahua
- Died: November 20, 1986 (aged 79) Chihuahua, Chihuahua
- Party: PRI
- Spouse(s): Odille Bronimann Flottat; Blanca Patricia Clark (a.k.a. Patricia Morán)
- Occupation: Lawyer

Óscar Flores Sánchez (June 22, 1907 – November 20, 1986) was a Mexican attorney and politician. He was Governor of the northern state of Chihuahua from 1968 until 1974 and the Attorney General of Mexico from 1976 until 1982.
