= Víctor Bravo Ahuja =

Mexican politician

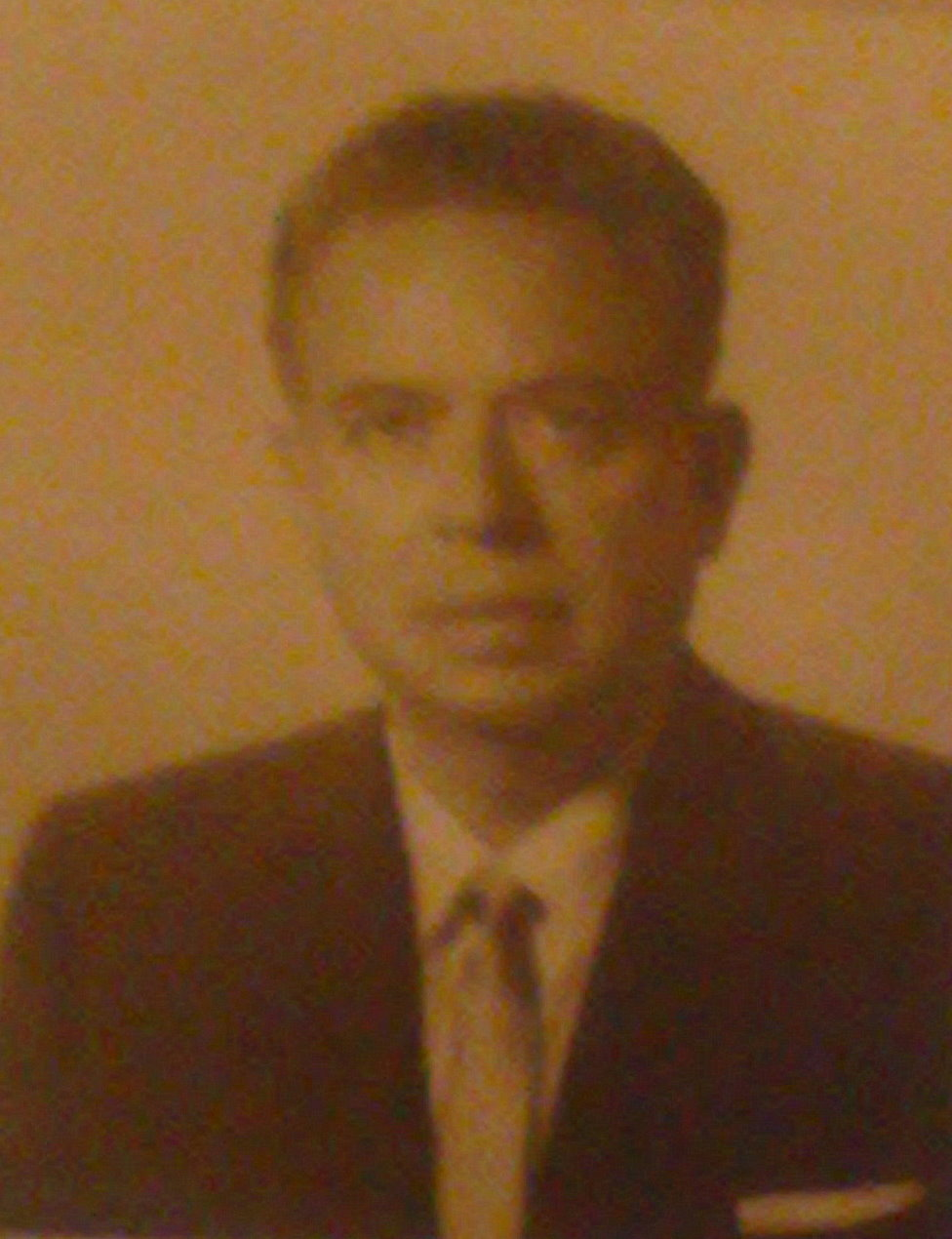

Secretary of Public Education of Mexico
- In office 1 December 1970 – 30 November 1976
- President: Luis Echeverría
- Preceded by: Agustín Yañez
- Succeeded by: Porfirio Muñoz Ledo

Governor of Oaxaca
- In office 1 December 1968 – 30 November 1970
- Preceded by: Rodolfo Brena Torres
- Succeeded by: Fernando Gómez Sandoval

Director General/Rector of the Monterrey Institute of Technology*
- In office 1951–1958
- Preceded by: Roberto Guajardo Suárez
- Succeeded by: Fernando García Roel

Personal details
- Born: 20 February 1918 Tuxtepec, Oaxaca, Mexico
- Died: 2 September 1990 (aged 72) Cuernavaca, Morelos, Mexico
- Party: Revolutionary Institutional Party (PRI)
- Education: National Polytechnic Institute; University of Michigan
- Profession: Academic and politician
- At the Monterrey Institute of Technology he served as Director General from 1951 to April 1955 and as its first Rector from 1955 to 1958.

Víctor Bravo Ahuja (20 February 1918 – 2 September 1990) was a Mexican politician and academician who served as Secretary of Public Education in the administration of Luis Echeverría (1970–76), as Governor of Oaxaca (1968–70) and as Director General (1951–55) and then Rector (1955–58) of the Monterrey Institute of Technology (ITESM).

He was born into a family composed by Rodrigo Bravo Monsalve and Carmen Ahuja Beauregard and became one of the first four students to graduate with a bachelor's degree in Aeronautical Engineering from the National Polytechnic Institute. He interrupted his master's degree at the California Institute of Technology, served in the Mexican Air Force and completed his master's degree at the University of Michigan.
