= Emilio Óscar Rabasa =

Mexican politician

Emilio Óscar Rabasa Mishkin (23 January 1925 – 14 June 2008) was a Mexican politician, diplomat and academic.

== Early life ==
Rabasa Mishkin was born in Mexico City, the son of Oscar Rabasa, a distinguished Mexican diplomat, and Mrs. Lillian Mishkin, and grandson of constitutional lawyer, poet, and one-time Governor of Chiapas Emilio Rabasa Estebanell (1856–1930). He studied law at the National Autonomous University of Mexico (UNAM), where he also earned his J.D. and later founded the Faculty of Political and Social Sciences.

== Political career ==
Rabasa served as Ambassador to the United States in 1970–71, during the government of U.S. President Richard Nixon. On 1 December 1970, President Luis Echeverría appointed him Secretary of Foreign Affairs. He oversaw a period of intense diplomatic activity, during which Mexico doubled (from 67 to 129) the number of countries with which it maintained diplomatic relations, particularly among the nations of the Third World and the Non-Aligned Movement. During Rabasa's time at the foreign ministry, Mexico refused to impose OAS-led sanctions on Castro's Cuba and admitted a flood of political refugees from Pinochet's Chile. Rabasa was also instrumental in the country's adoption of a 200-nautical-mile (370 km) Economic Exclusion Zone and the creation of the Matías Romero Diplomatic Studies Institute. He also signed Mexico's first cooperation agreement with the European Economic Community.

In 1975, the Non-Aligned Movement member nations which also were part of the United Nations General Assembly pushed for the Resolution 3379 along with Arab countries and the support of the Soviet bloc. It was a declarative nonbinding measure that equated Zionism with South Africa's Apartheid and as a form of racial discrimination. This process was a manifestation of Cold War bipolar logics. The bloc voting produced a majority in the United Nations that systematically condemned Israel in the following resolutions: 3089, 3210, 3236, 32/40, etc.

On the other hand, the resolution must be read in the light of Third World politics promoted by political figures such as the Mexican president Luis Echeverría. He used the 1975 World Conference on Women as a platform to build his own figure among the Non-Aligned Movement and looking forward to the Secretary-General of the United Nations. This resulted in a touristic boycott of the American Jewish community against Mexico, which made visible internal and external conflicts of Echeverría's politics, for example with Rabasa.

In December 1975, Rabasa visited Israel in an effort to ease tensions. His statements during the visit provoked criticism in Mexico where they were interpreted as a retreat from the government's position. The controversy aggravated existing disagreements between Rabasa, who had offered a resignation twice before, and Echeverría. He resigned from the cabinet on 28 December 1975. He was replaced by Alfonso García Robles.

After he stepped down he wrote several books including History of the Mexican Constitution, The Political Thought of the Constituent and Environmental Law. He later served at the Permanent Court of Arbitration in The Hague and on the OAS's Inter-American Juridical Committee in Rio de Janeiro.

== Death ==
Rabasa died on 14 June 2008 of heart failure.

Political offices
Preceded by Antonio Carrillo Flores	Secretary of Foreign Affairs; 1970–1975	Succeeded by Alfonso García Robles
