= Secretariat of Labor and Social Welfare =

Mexico Secretariat of Labor and Social Welfare
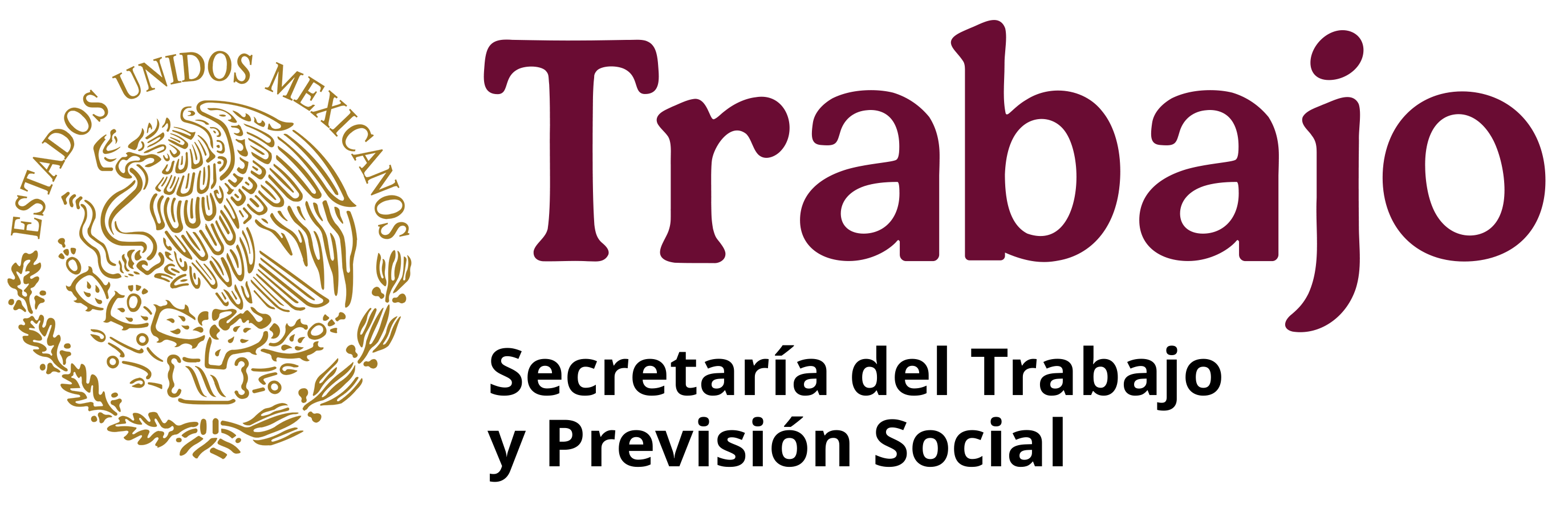
- Secretariat of Labor and Social Welfare logo

Agency overview
- Jurisdiction: Federal government of Mexico
- Agency executive: Marath Bolaños López, Secretary
- Website: http://www.stps.gob.mx

The Mexican Secretariat of Labor and Social Welfare (Spanish: Secretaría del Trabajo y Previsión Social, STPS) is a Federal Government Department in charge of all social health services in the Mexican Republic. The Secretary is a member of the federal executive cabinet. In addition to the legal Executive Cabinet there are other Cabinet-level administration offices that report directly to the President of the Republic, and the Secretary of Labor and Social Welfare is appointed by the President of Mexico.

- Supervises the implementation of the regulations in Article 123 concerning labor.
- Attempts to achieve a balance between production factors, in keeping with the appropriate legal regulations.

== List of secretaries ==
- President Manuel Ávila Camacho
  - (1941–1946) : Ignacio García Téllez
- President Miguel Alemán
  - (1946–1948) : Andrés Serra Rojas
  - (1948–1952) : Manuel Ramírez Vázquez
- President Adolfo Ruiz Cortines
  - (1952–1957) : Adolfo López Mateos
  - (1957–1958) : Salomón González Blanco
- President Adolfo López Mateos
  - (1958–1964) : Salomón González Blanco
- President Gustavo Díaz Ordaz
  - (1964–1970) : Salomón González Blanco
- President Luis Echeverría
  - (1970–1972) : Rafael Hernández Ochoa
  - (1972–1975) : Porfirio Muñoz Ledo
  - (1975–1976) : Carlos Gálvez Betancourt
- President José López Portillo
  - (1976–1982) : Pedro Ojeda Paullada
- President Miguel de la Madrid
  - (1982–1988) : Arsenio Farell Cubillas
- President Carlos Salinas de Gortari
  - (1988–1994) : Arsenio Farell Cubillas
  - (1994–1994) : Manuel Gómez Peralta
- President Ernesto Zedillo
  - (1994–1995) : Santiago Oñate Laborde
  - (1995–1998) : Javier Bonilla García
  - (1998–1999) : José Antonio González Fernández
  - (1999–2000) : Mariano Palacios Alcocer
- President Vicente Fox
  - (2000–2005) : José Carlos María Abascal Carranza
  - (2005–2006) : Francisco Javier Salazar Sáenz
- President Felipe Calderón
  - (2006–2011) : Javier Lozano Alarcón
  - (2011-2012) : Rosalinda Vélez Juárez
- President Enrique Peña Nieto
  - (2012–2018) Alfonso Navarrete Prida
  - (2018) Roberto Campa Cifrián
- President Andrés Manuel López Obrador
  - (2018–2023) : Luisa María Alcalde Luján
  - (2023–present) : Marath Bolaños López

== See also ==
- Social Welfare in Mexico
