= Mario Moya Palencia =

Mexican politician and diplomat (1933–2006)

Secretary of the Interior
- In office 11 November 1969 – 30 November 1976
- President: Gustavo Díaz Ordaz; Luis Echeverría
- Preceded by: Luis Echeverría
- Succeeded by: Jesús Reyes Heroles

Personal details
- Born: 14 June 1933 Mexico City, Mexico
- Died: 9 October 2006 (aged 73) Mexico City, Mexico
- Party: Institutional Revolutionary Party
- Education: National Autonomous University of Mexico

Mario Moya Palencia (14 June 1933 – 9 October 2006) was a Mexican politician and diplomat affiliated with the Institutional Revolutionary Party (PRI).

== Early life ==
Mario Moya Palencia was born in Mexico City on 14 June 1933. He received a bachelor's degree in law from the National Autonomous University of Mexico (UNAM), where he undertook some postgraduate studies in Mexican history.

== Career ==
=== In law and politics ===
After working as a lawyer and journalist until 1959, he joined the Institutional Revolutionary Party (PRI). He subsequently held several government positions, including head of the Federal Zone Department and deputy director of real estate assets at the Secretariat of National Patrimony. He later served as Director General of Cinematography at the Secretariat of the Interior from 1964 to 1968, followed by roles as president and director general of Productora e Importadora de Papel (PIPSA). In 1969, he was appointed Undersecretary of the Interior, and from 1970 to 1976 he served as Secretary of the Interior.

=== Diplomatic career ===
Moya Palencia began his diplomatic career in 1985 as Mexico's permanent representative to the United Nations, a position he held until 1989. He later served as an ambassador to Cuba from 1991 to 1993. In addition, he also served as an ambassador to Italy and was appointed as a special envoy to Central America and the Caribbean to promote regional cooperation programs.

=== Professor of law ===
In addition to his political and diplomatic career, Moya Palencia was a professor of constitutional law at UNAM and taught Mexican electoral law at the PRI’s Institute for Political Training. He also served as director general of Organización Editorial Mexicana from 1977 to 1979 and of National Tourism Development Fund (FONATUR) from 1979 to 1982.

=== El Halconazo ===
He was among several former officials, including former president Luis Echeverría, who were accused of orchestrating the El Halconazo, a student massacre that occurred on 10 June 1971. Moya Palencia and ten other public officials were criminally charged during the Mexican dirty war. In 2005, a federal judge declined to issue arrest warrants against Moya Palencia and the others, ruling that the statute of limitations had expired for the massacre accusations.

== Death ==
Mora Palencia died on 9 October 2006 of a heart attack.
