= Luis Enrique Bracamontes =

Mexican politician (1923–2003)

Luis Enrique Bracamontes Gálvez (June 22, 1923 - January 15, 2003) was a Mexican politician and engineer. He was a member of the Institutional Revolutionary Party and Secretary of Public Works under President Luis Echeverria Álvarez.

Luis Enrique Bracamontes was born in Tapalpa, Jalisco on June 22, 1923. Civil Engineer graduated from the National School of Engineering, Faculty of Engineering today the National Autonomous University of Mexico and Master in Physics, from the Faculty of Sciences of the UNAM. Doctor Honoris Causa by the University of the Americas in 1973 and Doctor Honoris Causa by the Autonomous University of Chihuahua in 1997.

He served as Project Manager of the University City and then was first Undersecretary of Communications and Public Works, from 1952 to 1958, and Secretary of Public Works 1958–1964. As of December 1, 1970 President Luis Echeverria Álvarez appointed him as Secretary of Public Works. He was also a consulting engineer of several Latin American countries. In recognition for his contribution to the relief efforts of the 1972 Nicaragua earthquake, he was awarded the Grand Cross with Silver Plaque from the Order of Ruben Dario. The last public position he occupied was Director General of the Mexican Institute of Transport between 1989 and 1994. He was also the founding president of the Mexican Academy of Engineering and of the Mexican Association of Public Works.

He died in Mexico City, on January 15, 2003.

== Awards ==
- The first Gold Plummet part of the Pan American Union of Engineering Associations, UPADI highest medal awarded by the agency.
- The "University of Cauca Medal" by the University of Cauca in the Republic of Colombia
- Grand Officer of the Order of Merit Road. Cuba.
- Grand Cross of the Order of Boyacá. Colombia.
- Grand Cross with Silver Plaque Order Ruben Dario. Nicaragua.
- Grand Officer of the Order of the Polar Star. Sweden.
- Alcantara Foundation Caceres City, granted by the King of Spain, the International Prize Alcántara Bridge, for the design of Tampico Bridge.
- National Engineering Award, 1994. Mexico.
- Mr. Francisco de Garay Recognition, 1995. Mexico.

PROFESSIONAL

- From 1950 to 1955, Project Manager of the University City of Mexico.
- From 1952 to 1958, Secretary for Communications and Works.
- From 1958 to 1964, Secretary of Public Works.
- From 1965 to 1970, President and CEO of the Mexican Company Engineering Consultants, S. A. and Planning and Works and Process Control, S. A.
- From 1966 to 1970, CIVAC Director, Industrial City of Cuernavaca Valley.
- Between 1965 and 1987, Consulting Engineer of the governments of Colombia, Panama, Honduras, Nicaragua, El Salvador, Guatemala and Venezuela, through the International Bank for Reconstruction and Development, Inter-American Development Bank and the Central American Bank for Economic Integration.
- From 1970 to 1976, Secretary of Public Works.
- Since 1977, Consulting Engineer in Mexico and abroad.
- From 1977 to 1989, chairman of the Board of Directors of the Company Engineering Consultants Mexican, S. A. From C. V., and the Board of Directors of COMECDIPLAN, S. A.
- From 1989 to 1994, the Director General of the Mexican Institute of Transport.

HONORS AND HONORARY POSITIONS

- President of the Mexican Academy of Engineering, 1973-1991.
- It is the founding president of the Mexican Academy of Engineering.
- President of the Alumni Society of the Faculty of Engineering of the National Autonomous University of Mexico, from 1975 to 1977.
- Permanent member of the Mexican Olympic Committee since 1973.
- Member of the College of Civil Engineers of Mexico.
- Member of the Association of Engineers and Architects of Mexico.
- Member of the Mexican Union of Engineering Associations.
- Member of the Mexican Society of Engineers.
- Honorary Fellow of the College of Civil Engineers of the State of Jalisco.
- Member of several European and American associations of engineers.
- Founding President of the Mexican Association of Public Works.
- Founding President of the American Federation of Systems and Computer Engineering.
- Honorary Chairman of the Mexican Academy of Engineering, 1991-1993.

ACADEMIC ACTIVITIES

- From 1941 to 1945, Professor at the National Preparatory School of the National Autonomous University of Mexico.
- From 1944 to 1950, Professor at the National School of Engineers, now Faculty of Engineering of the UNAM.
- From 1944 to 1948, Professor of Topography.
- From 1947 to 1951, Professor of Exercise for Stability.
- In 1957, in cooperation with the Division of Studies in the Faculty of Engineering of the UNAM, implemented for the SCOP scholarship, specialization course Land routes.
- In 1967, he founded Land routes courses at Universidad del Cauca, Republic of Colombia.
- In 1968, acting as a Consultant, studied and developed organizational plans of the School of Engineering at the University of Tamaulipas,
- From 1970 to 1991, he promoted:

Naval Engineer's career in Engineering Escueta Universidad Veracruzana. The Master Port Engineering, University of Tamaulipas. The Master Decision Making (Systems Engineering) at the Faculty of Engineering of the University of the State of Mexico. The Master of Urban Regional Planning, School of Architecture of the University of Guanajuato. The Master of Traffic Engineering, School of Civil Engineering, University of Nuevo León. The Master of Land routes in the School of Engineering at the University of Chihuahua. The Master of Transport, at the Faculty of Engineering of the National Autonomous University of Mexico. The Master of Transport Integration at the Faculty of Engineering of the Universidad Autónoma de Querétaro.

CONFERENCES

- In 1958, he organized and chaired the IV World Congress in Mexico, the International Road Federation, IRF.
- In 1963, he organized and chaired in Mexico, the Pan American Railway Congress Xl.
- In the years of 1969 and 1970, designed and organized the First and Second "Pan-American Seminar on Roads"
- In 1972, he organized and chaired the First Conference on Transport infrastructure at the level of Ministers, with the participation of Canada, USA, Mexico, Guatemala, El Salvador, Nicaragua, Honduras, Costa Rica and Panama.
- In 1973, he organized and chaired the Second Conference on Transport infrastructure at the level of Ministers, with the participation of the countries of North, Central and South of our continent.
- In 1974, organized the Second Inter-American Congress and Computer Systems, was appointed President of the American Federation of Systems and Computer Engineering.
- In 1975, he organized and chaired in Mexico, the XV World Road Congress, Permanent International Association of Road Congresses, based in Paris, France.
- In the years of 1981-1991, in his capacity as President of the Mexican Academy of Engineering, organized and chaired five International Symposia on Nuclear Energy for peaceful purposes with the participation of Canada, France, Sweden, United States of America and the Federal Republic of Germany, Great Britain, and the Netherlands.

International Symposium on Land Traffic Safety. International Symposium on the Impact of New Technologies in Developing Countries. International Seminar on Nuclear Energy in Latin America. International Symposium on Industrial Modernization International Seminar on Experiences in the implementation of Nuclear Power Plants. International Symposium on Air Transportation. International Symposium on Urban Engineering in the Development of the Country. International Symposium involving Builders Society of Stockholm, Sweden. International Seminar on Science Parks. 75 roundtable discussions on the issue of national technological development.

- In 1991, he organized and chaired in Mexico, I International Congress on "The State of the Art of Engineering in Mexico and in the world".
- From 1989 to 1994, as Director General of the Mexican Institute of Transport, organized international courses: Road Operation, Maintenance of Roads, Rural Transport Services, Integrated Transport Systems and International Physical Distribution. In addition, the International Symposia: Pavements, Bridges, Transportation Planning Forecasting, Works Management, Financial Engineering, Transportation Engineering, International Meeting PROVIAL IBRD-IMT and the International Congress of Supercomputing and Transportation Research Centers. He represented Mexico in several international congresses.
