= Carlos Gálvez Betancourt =

Mexican politician (1921–1990)

Carlos Gálvez Betancourt (1921 in Jiquilpan, Michoacán – 1990) was the governor of Michoacán from 1968 to 1970. He also served as the Mexican Secretary of Labor.
