= 1986 in Mexico =

- Decades: 1960s; 1970s; 1980s; 1990s; 2000s
- See also: History of Mexico; List of years in Mexico; Timeline of Mexican history

Events in the year 1986 in Mexico.

== Incumbents ==
=== Federal government ===
- President: Miguel de la Madrid
- Interior Secretary (SEGOB): Manuel Bartlett Díaz
- Secretary of Foreign Affairs (SRE): Bernardo Sepúlveda Amor
- Communications Secretary (SCT): Daniel Díaz Díaz
- Education Secretary (SEP): Manuel Bartlett
- Secretary of Defense (SEDENA): Juan Arévalo Gardoqui
- Secretary of Navy: Miguel Ángel Gómez Ortega
- Secretary of Labor and Social Welfare: Arsenio Farell Cubillas
- Secretary of Welfare: Guillermo Carrillo Arena/Manuel Camacho Solís
- Secretary of Public Education: Miguel González Avelar
- Tourism Secretary (SECTUR): Carlos Hank González
- Secretary of the Environment (SEMARNAT): Pedro Ojeda Paullada
- Secretary of Health (SALUD): Guillermo Soberón Acevedo

=== Supreme Court ===
- President of the Supreme Court: Carlos del Río Rodríguez

=== Governors ===
- Aguascalientes: Rodolfo Landeros Gallegos/Miguel Ángel Barberena Vega
- Baja California: Xicoténcatl Leyva Mortera (PRI)
- Baja California Sur: Alberto Andrés Alvarado Arámburo
- Campeche: Abelardo Carrillo Zavala
- Chiapas: Gustavo Armendáriz/Absalón Castellanos Domínguez
- Chihuahua: Oscar Ornelas/Saúl González Herrera/Fernando Baeza Meléndez
- Coahuila: José de las Fuentes Rodríguez
- Colima: Elías Zamora Verduzco
- Durango: José Ramírez Gamero
- Guanajuato: Rafael Corrales Ayala
- Guerrero: Alejandro Cervantes Delgado
- Hidalgo: Guillermo Rossell de la Lama
- Jalisco: Enrique Álvarez del Castillo
- State of Mexico: Alfredo del Mazo González
- Michoacán: Cuauhtémoc Cárdenas/Luis Martínez Villicaña
- Morelos: Lauro Ortega Martínez (PRI).
- Nayarit: Emilio Manuel González Parra
- Nuevo León: Jorge Treviño
- Oaxaca: Heladio Ramírez López
- Puebla: Guillermo Jiménez Morales
- Querétaro: Mariano Palacios Alcocer
- Quintana Roo: Pedro Joaquín Coldwell
- San Luis Potosí: Florencio Salazar Martínez
- Sinaloa: Francisco Labastida
- Sonora: Rodolfo Félix Valdés
- Tabasco: Enrique González Pedrero
- Tamaulipas: Américo Villarreal Guerra
- Tlaxcala: Tulio Hernández Gómez
- Veracruz: Agustín Acosta Lagunes/Fernando Gutiérrez Barrios
- Yucatán: Víctor Manzanilla Schaffer
- Zacatecas: José Guadalupe Cervantes Corona/Genaro Borrego Estrada
- Regent of Mexico City: Ramón Aguirre Velázquez

== Events ==
- The girl band Fandango is established.
- The Museo de la Estampa and the Franz Mayer Museum are founded.
- Vacation resort Rancho Leonero is established.
- Conni Carranza from Sonora becomes Señorita México 1986.
- The Mexico City Light Rail starts operating after being upgraded from a streetcar line.
- March 31: Mexicana Flight 940
- September 11: Centro Escolar el Encino established.

== Awards ==
- Belisario Domínguez Medal of Honor – Salvador Zubirán

== Film ==
- List of Mexican films of 1986

== Sport ==
- 1985–86 Mexican Primera División season
- Ángeles Negros de Puebla win the Mexican League
- 1986 FIFA World Cup
- 1986 Central American and Caribbean Junior Championships in Athletics in Mexico City.
- 1986 Mexican Grand Prix

== Births ==
- July 8: Jaime Garcia, baseball player
- November 22: Sebastián Zurita, actor.
- Date unknown: Luis Trujillo Llame, Catholic priest; (d. November 21, 2018).

== Deaths ==
- July 9: Nellie Campobello, writer. (b. 1900)
- August 6: Emilio Fernández, movie director, actor, and screenwriter (b. 1904)
