= 1983 in Mexico =

- Decades: 1960s; 1970s; 1980s; 1990s; 2000s
- See also: History of Mexico; List of years in Mexico; Timeline of Mexican history

Events in the year 1983 in Mexico.

== Incumbents ==
=== Federal government ===
- President: Miguel de la Madrid
- Interior Secretary (SEGOB): Manuel Bartlett Díaz
- Secretary of Foreign Affairs (SRE): Bernardo Sepúlveda Amor
- Communications Secretary (SCT): Rodolfo Félix Valdés
- Education Secretary (SEP): Manuel Bartlett
- Secretary of Defense (SEDENA): Juan Arévalo Gardoqui
- Secretary of Navy: Miguel Ángel Gómez Ortega
- Secretary of Labor and Social Welfare: Arsenio Farell Cubillas
- Secretary of Welfare: Guillermo Carrillo Arena
- Secretary of Public Education: Jesús Reyes Heroles
- Tourism Secretary (SECTUR): Carlos Hank González
- Secretary of the Environment (SEMARNAT): Pedro Ojeda Paullada
- Secretary of Health (SALUD): Guillermo Soberón Acevedo

=== Supreme Court ===
- President of the Supreme Court: Jorge Iñárritu y Ramírez de Aguilar

=== Governors ===
- Aguascalientes: Rodolfo Landeros Gallegos (PRI)
- Baja California
  - Roberto de la Madrid (PRI), until October 31
  - Xicoténcatl Leyva Mortera (PRI), starting November 1
- Baja California Sur: Alberto Andrés Alvarado Arámburo
- Campeche: Eugenio Echeverría Castellot
- Chiapas: Absalón Castellanos Domínguez
- Chihuahua: Oscar Ornelas
- Coahuila: José de las Fuentes Rodríguez
- Colima: Griselda Álvarez
- Durango: Armando del Castillo Franco
- Guanajuato: Enrique Velasco Ibarra
- Guerrero: Alejandro Cervantes Delgado
- Hidalgo: Guillermo Rossell de la Lama
- Jalisco: Flavio Romero de Velasco/Enrique Álvarez del Castillo
- State of Mexico: Alfredo del Mazo González
- Michoacán: Cuauhtémoc Cárdenas
- Morelos: Lauro Ortega Martínez
- Nayarit: Emilio Manuel González Parra
- Nuevo León: Alfonso Martínez Domínguez/Jorge Treviño
- Oaxaca: Pedro Vázquez Colmenares
- Puebla: Guillermo Jiménez Morales
- Querétaro: Rafael Camacho Guzmán
- Quintana Roo: Pedro Joaquín Coldwell
- San Luis Potosí: Carlos Jonguitud Barrios
- Sinaloa: Antonio Toledo Corro
- Sonora: Samuel Ocaña García
- Tabasco: Enrique González Pedrero
- Tamaulipas: Emilio Martínez Manautou
- Tlaxcala: Tulio Hernández Gómez
- Veracruz: Agustín Acosta Lagunes
- Yucatán: Graciliano Alpuche Pinzón
- Zacatecas: José Guadalupe Cervantes Corona
- Regent of Mexico City: Ramón Aguirre Velázquez

== Events ==
- The National Institute of Statistics, Geography and Informatics (INEGI) is founded.
- Mónica Rosas from Durango is crowned Señorita México by outgoing titleholder Alba Cervera.
- Benedetti's Pizza is founded by Felipe Baeza.
- Galería OMR founded by its principals Patricia Ortiz Monasterio and Jaime Riestra.
- April 3 – The 2nd festival of the popular Juguemos a Cantar series begins; it ends five weeks later on May 1.
- August 23–29: Hurricane Barry.
- December 2: The Church of Latter Day Saints founds its Mexico City Mexico Temple.

== Awards ==
- Belisario Domínguez Medal of Honor – Jesús Silva Herzog

== Film ==
- List of Mexican films of 1983

== Sport ==
- 1982–83 Mexican Primera División season
- 1983 FIFA World Youth Championship
- Football Club Chapulineros de Oaxacais founded.
- September 4: Football Club Santos Laguna is founded.

== Births ==
- March 1
  - Elán, singer-songwriter
  - Lupita Nyong'o, Mexican-Kenyan actress
- March 9 – Maite Perroni, actress, singer, and model.
- March 11 – Renato López, television presenter, actor, musician (d. November 23, 2016).
- May 14 – Anahí, singer, songwriter, and actress.
- July 14 – Tomas Villa, featherweight boxer (d. 2018)
- November 29 – Rubén Espinosa, photojournalist (Proceso and Cuartoscuro; d. July 31, 2015).

== Deaths ==
- April 11 - Dolores del Río, actress (b. 1904)
- May 14 – Miguel Alemán Valdés, 46th President of Mexico (b. 1903)
