= 1985 in Mexico =

- Decades: 1960s; 1970s; 1980s; 1990s; 2000s
- See also: History of Mexico; List of years in Mexico; Timeline of Mexican history

Events in the year 1985 in Mexico.

== Incumbents ==
=== Federal government ===
- President: Miguel de la Madrid
- Interior Secretary (SEGOB): Manuel Bartlett Díaz
- Secretary of Foreign Affairs (SRE): Bernardo Sepúlveda Amor
- Communications Secretary (SCT): Daniel Díaz Díaz
- Education Secretary (SEP): Manuel Bartlett
- Secretary of Defense (SEDENA): Juan Arévalo Gardoqui
- Secretary of Navy: Miguel Ángel Gómez Ortega
- Secretary of Labor and Social Welfare: Arsenio Farell Cubillas
- Secretary of Welfare: Guillermo Carrillo Arena
- Secretary of Public Education: Jesús Reyes Heroles/Miguel González Avelar
- Tourism Secretary (SECTUR): Carlos Hank González
- Secretary of the Environment (SEMARNAT): Pedro Ojeda Paullada
- Secretary of Health (SALUD): Guillermo Soberón Acevedo

=== Supreme Court ===
- President of the Supreme Court: Jorge Iñárritu y Ramírez de Aguilar

=== Governors ===
- Aguascalientes: Rodolfo Landeros Gallegos
- Baja California: Xicoténcatl Leyva Mortera (PRI)
- Baja California Sur: Alberto Andrés Alvarado Arámburo
- Campeche: Eugenio Echeverría Castellot/Abelardo Carrillo Zavala
- Chiapas: Absalón Castellanos Domínguez
- Chihuahua: Oscar Ornelas/Saúl González Herrera
- Coahuila: José de las Fuentes Rodríguez
- Colima: Elías Zamora Verduzco
- Durango: Armando del Castillo Franco/José Ramírez Gamero
- Guanajuato: Agustín Téllez Cruces/Rafael Corrales Ayala
- Guerrero: Alejandro Cervantes Delgado
- Hidalgo: Guillermo Rossell de la Lama
- Jalisco: Enrique Álvarez del Castillo
- State of Mexico: Alfredo del Mazo González
- Michoacán: Cuauhtémoc Cárdenas
- Morelos: Lauro Ortega Martínez (PRI).
- Nayarit: Emilio Manuel González Parra
- Nuevo León: Alfonso Martínez Domínguez/Jorge Treviño
- Oaxaca: Heladio Ramírez López
- Puebla: Guillermo Jiménez Morales
- Querétaro: Mariano Palacios Alcocer
- Quintana Roo: Pedro Joaquín Coldwell
- San Luis Potosí: Florencio Salazar Martínez
- Sinaloa: Antonio Toledo Corro
- Sonora: Rodolfo Félix Valdés
- Tabasco: Enrique González Pedrero
- Tamaulipas: Américo Villarreal Guerra
- Tlaxcala: Tulio Hernández Gómez
- Veracruz: Agustín Acosta Lagunes
- Yucatán: Víctor Manzanilla Schaffer
- Zacatecas: José Guadalupe Cervantes Corona
- Regent of Mexico City: Ramón Aguirre Velázquez

== Events ==
- January 1, Querétaro state elections
- June 17, Morelos I was the first communications satellite launch by Mexico.
- July 7, state elections in Colima
- September 19, a magnitude 8.0 earthquake struck in Mexico City.
- The LIII Legislature Congress of Mexico begins its inauguration.
- November 26, on the STS-61-B mission Rodolfo Neri Vela became the first Mexican and second Latin American astronaut to reach into space.

== Awards ==
- Belisario Domínguez Medal of Honor – María Lavalle Urbina

== Notable births ==
- April 9 – Carlos Manzo, politician (d. 2025).
- May 31 – Zoraida Gómez, actress.
- September 19 – Fourteen newborn babies survived the earthquake.
- October 6 – Sandra Góngora, ten-pin bowler
- October 15 – Sherlyn González, singer and actress.
- December 11 – Karla Souza, Mexican-American actress.
- Date unknown – Ricardo Domínguez, welterweight wrestler (d. 2017).

== Notable deaths ==
- An estimated 10,000 people died during the September 19 earthquake.

== Sports ==
- Mexico managed to win for the first time to Poland on 5 February when at the opening of Corregidora Stadium in Querétaro.
