= 1984 in Mexico =

- Decades: 1960s; 1970s; 1980s; 1990s; 2000s
- See also: History of Mexico; List of years in Mexico; Timeline of Mexican history

Events in the year 1984 in Mexico.

== Incumbents ==
=== Federal government ===
- President: Miguel de la Madrid
- Interior Secretary (SEGOB): Manuel Bartlett Díaz
- Secretary of Foreign Affairs (SRE): Bernardo Sepúlveda Amor
- Communications Secretary (SCT): Rodolfo Félix Valdés/Daniel Díaz Díaz
- Education Secretary (SEP): Manuel Bartlett
- Secretary of Defense (SEDENA): Juan Arévalo Gardoqui
- Secretary of Navy: Miguel Ángel Gómez Ortega
- Secretary of Labor and Social Welfare: Arsenio Farell Cubillas
- Secretary of Welfare: Guillermo Carrillo Arena
- Secretary of Public Education: Jesús Reyes Heroles
- Tourism Secretary (SECTUR): Carlos Hank González
- Secretary of the Environment (SEMARNAT): Pedro Ojeda Paullada
- Secretary of Health (SALUD): Guillermo Soberón Acevedo

=== Supreme Court ===
- President of the Supreme Court: Jorge Iñárritu y Ramírez de Aguilar

=== Governors ===
- Aguascalientes: Rodolfo Landeros Gallegos
- Baja California: Xicoténcatl Leyva Mortera (PRI)
- Baja California Sur: Alberto Andrés Alvarado Arámburo
- Campeche: Eugenio Echeverría Castellot
- Chiapas: Absalón Castellanos Domínguez
- Chihuahua: Oscar Ornelas
- Coahuila: José de las Fuentes Rodríguez
- Colima: Griselda Álvarez
- Durango: Armando del Castillo Franco
- Guanajuato: Enrique Velasco Ibarra/Agustín Téllez Cruces
- Guerrero: Alejandro Cervantes Delgado
- Hidalgo: Guillermo Rossell de la Lama
- Jalisco: Enrique Álvarez del Castillo
- State of Mexico: Alfredo del Mazo González
- Michoacán: Cuauhtémoc Cárdenas
- Morelos: Lauro Ortega Martínez
- Nayarit: Emilio Manuel González Parra
- Nuevo León: Alfonso Martínez Domínguez/Jorge Treviño
- Oaxaca: Pedro Vázquez Colmenares
- Puebla: Guillermo Jiménez Morales
- Querétaro: Rafael Camacho Guzmán
- Quintana Roo: Pedro Joaquín Coldwell
- San Luis Potosí: Carlos Jonguitud Barrios
- Sinaloa: Antonio Toledo Corro
- Sonora: Samuel Ocaña García
- Tabasco: Enrique González Pedrero
- Tamaulipas: Emilio Martínez Manautou
- Tlaxcala: Tulio Hernández Gómez
- Veracruz: Agustín Acosta Lagunes
- Yucatán: Graciliano Alpuche Pinzón/Víctor Cervera Pacheco
- Zacatecas: José Guadalupe Cervantes Corona
- Regent of Mexico City: Ramón Aguirre Velázquez

== Events ==
- The original Law on the National Coat of Arms, Flag and Anthem is passed.
- The Universidad Azteca is founded.
- March 14: Roman Catholic Diocese of Coatzacoalcos established.
- September 17 – 23: Hurricane Odile
- November 3: Roman Catholic Diocese of Atlacomulco established
- November 19: San Juanico disaster

== Awards ==
- Belisario Domínguez Medal of Honor – Salomón González Blanco

== Births ==
- May 17 — Alejandro Edda, actor
- July 5 — Carlos Ferro, actor and music video director
- December 9 — Ociel Baena, LGBT rights activist (d. 2023)
- December 11 — Sandra Echeverría, actress, singer and model

== Deaths ==
- January 7 — Eva Sámano de Lopez, First Lady of Mexico (1958-1964) (b. 1910)

== Film ==
- List of Mexican films of 1984

== Sport ==
- 1983–84 Mexican Primera División season.
- Leones de Yucatán win the Mexican League.
- Mexico at the 1984 Winter Olympics.
- Mexico at the 1984 Summer Olympics.
- Mexico at the 1984 Summer Paralympics.
- The Indios de Ciudad Juárez cease to exist.
- The Pioneros de Cancún are founded.
- The Ángeles de Puebla are founded.
