= 1982 in Mexico =

- Decades: 1960s; 1970s; 1980s; 1990s; 2000s
- See also: History of Mexico; List of years in Mexico; Timeline of Mexican history

Events in the year 1982 in Mexico.

== Incumbents ==
=== Federal government ===
- President: José López Portillo (until November 30), Miguel de la Madrid (starting December 1)
- Interior Secretary (SEGOB): Enrique Olivares Santana (until November 30), Manuel Bartlett Díaz (starting December 1)
- Secretary of Foreign Affairs (SRE): Jorge Castañeda y Álvarez (until November 30), Bernardo Sepúlveda Amor (starting December 1)
- Communications Secretary (SCT): Emilio Mújica Montoya/Rodolfo Félix Valdés
- Secretary of Defense (SEDENA): Félix Galván López/Juan Arévalo Gardoqui
- Secretary of Navy: Ricardo Cházaro Lara/Miguel Ángel Gómez Ortega
- Secretary of Labor and Social Welfare: Pedro Ojeda Paullada/Arsenio Farell Cubillas
- Secretary of Welfare: Pedro Ramírez Vázquez/Marcelo Javelly Girard
- Secretary of Public Education: Fernando Solana Morales/Jesús Reyes Heroles
- Tourism Secretary (SECTUR): Carlos Hank González
- Secretary of the Environment (SEMARNAT): Fernando Rafful Miguel/Pedro Ojeda Paullada
- Secretary of Health (SALUD): Guillermo Soberón Acevedo

=== Supreme Court ===
- President of the Supreme Court: Mario G. Rebolledo Fernández then Jorge Iñárritu y Ramírez de Aguilar

=== Governors ===
- Aguascalientes: Rodolfo Landeros Gallegos
- Baja California: Roberto de la Madrid (PRI)
- Baja California Sur: Alberto Andrés Alvarado Arámburo
- Campeche: Eugenio Echeverría Castellot
- Chiapas: Juan Sabines Gutiérrez/Absalón Castellanos Domínguez
- Chihuahua: Oscar Ornelas
- Coahuila: José de las Fuentes Rodríguez
- Colima: Griselda Álvarez
- Durango: Armando del Castillo Franco
- Guanajuato: Enrique Velasco Ibarra
- Guerrero: Alejandro Cervantes Delgado
- Hidalgo: Guillermo Rossell de la Lama
- Jalisco: Flavio Romero de Velasco/Enrique Álvarez del Castillo
- State of Mexico: Alfredo del Mazo González
- Michoacán: Cuauhtémoc Cárdenas
- Morelos
  - Armando León Bejarano (PRI), until May 18.
  - Lauro Ortega Martínez (PRI), starting May 18.
- Nayarit: Emilio Manuel González Parra
- Nuevo León: Alfonso Martínez Domínguez
- Oaxaca: Pedro Vázquez Colmenares
- Puebla: Guillermo Jiménez Morales
- Querétaro: Rafael Camacho Guzmán
- Quintana Roo: Pedro Joaquín Coldwell
- San Luis Potosí: Carlos Jonguitud Barrios
- Sinaloa: Antonio Toledo Corro
- Sonora: Samuel Ocaña García
- Tabasco: Leandro Rovirosa Wade/Enrique González Pedrero
- Tamaulipas: Emilio Martínez Manautou
- Tlaxcala: Tulio Hernández Gómez
- Veracruz: Agustín Acosta Lagunes
- Yucatán: Francisco Luna Kan/Graciliano Alpuche Pinzón
- Zacatecas: José Guadalupe Cervantes Corona
- Regent of Mexico City
  - Carlos Hank González
  - Ramón Aguirre Velázquez

== Events ==
- Museo Nacional de Arte is founded.
- March – Reino Aventura opens
- March 31 – 14 killed, 100 injured, and 15,000 others suffer the effects of the eruption of the Chichonal volcano, in Francisco León, Chiapas, 100 km from Villahermosa.
- July 4 – 1982 Mexican general election
- August 12 – Mexico announces it is unable to pay its large foreign debt, triggering a debt crisis that quickly spread throughout Latin America.
- September 1 – During his last government report, president José López Portillo nationalizes banks.
- December 1 – Miguel de la Madrid takes office as President of Mexico.

== Awards ==
- Belisario Domínguez Medal of Honor – General Raúl Madero González

== Sports ==
- Baseball – The Leones del Caracas team conquest their first Caribbean Series title in Hermosillo Sonora.
- Baseball – Indios de Ciudad Juárez win the Mexican League
- Football – 1981–82 Mexican Primera División season

== Births ==
- January 9 — Lorenza Morfín, road cyclist
- March 7 — Aarón Díaz, model, actor, and singer
- March 13 – Gisela Mota Ocampo, Presidente Municipal of Temixco, Morelos (January 1-January 2, 2016) (assassinated 2016)
- December 19 – Nara Falcón, synchronized swimmer
- Date unknown
  - Raúl Castañeda, boxer (d. September 6, 2017).
