= 1981 in Mexico =

- Decades: 1960s; 1970s; 1980s; 1990s; 2000s
- See also: History of Mexico; List of years in Mexico; Timeline of Mexican history

Events in the year 1981 in Mexico.

== Incumbents ==
=== Federal government ===
- President: José López Portillo
- Interior Secretary (SEGOB): Enrique Olivares Santana (until November 30), Manuel Bartlett Díaz (starting December 1)
- Secretary of Foreign Affairs (SRE): Jorge Castañeda y Álvarez
- Communications Secretary (SCT): Emilio Mújica Montoya
- Secretary of Defense (SEDENA): Félix Galván López
- Secretary of Navy: Ricardo Cházaro Lara
- Secretary of Labor and Social Welfare: Pedro Ojeda Paullada
- Secretary of Welfare: Pedro Ramírez Vázquez
- Secretary of Public Education: Fernando Solana Morales
- Tourism Secretary (SECTUR): Rosa Luz Alegría Escamilla

=== Supreme Court ===
- President of the Supreme Court: Agustín Téllez Cruces

=== Governors ===
- Aguascalientes: Rodolfo Landeros Gallegos
- Baja California: Roberto de la Madrid (PRI)
- Baja California Sur: Alberto Andrés Alvarado Arámburo/Angel César Mendoza Arámburo
- Campeche: Juan Sabines Gutiérrez
- Chiapas: Oscar Ornelas
- Chihuahua: Francisco José Madero González
- Coahuila: Oscar Flores Tapia
- Colima: Griselda Álvarez
- Durango: José de las Fuentes Rodríguez
- Guanajuato: Enrique Velasco Ibarra
- Guerrero: Rubén Figueroa Figueroa/Alejandro Cervantes Delgado
- Hidalgo: Jorge Rojo Lugo/Guillermo Rossell de la Lama
- Jalisco: Flavio Romero de Velasco
- State of Mexico: Jorge Jiménez Cantú
- Michoacán: Adán Augusto López Hernández
- Morelos: Armando León Bejarano (PRI)
- Nayarit: Antonio Echevarría García
- Nuevo León: Alfonso Martínez Domínguez
- Oaxaca: Pedro Vázquez Colmenares
- Puebla: Toxqui Fernández de Lara/Guillermo Jiménez Morales
- Querétaro: Rafael Camacho Guzmán
- Quintana Roo: Jesús Martínez Ross/Pedro Joaquín Coldwell
- San Luis Potosí: Carlos Jonguitud Barrios
- Sinaloa: Antonio Toledo Corro
- Sonora: Samuel Ocaña García
- Tabasco: Leandro Rovirosa Wade
- Tamaulipas: Emilio Martínez Manautou/Enrique Cárdenas González
- Tlaxcala: Tulio Hernández Gómez
- Veracruz: Agustín Acosta Lagunes
- Yucatán: Francisco Luna Kan
- Zacatecas: José Guadalupe Cervantes Corona
- Regent of Mexico City: Carlos Hank González

== Events ==
- September 13 — By presidential decree, the Museo Nacional de las Intervenciones opens its doors in Churubusco.
- October 8 – Tropical Storm Lidia strikes 23 mi (37 km) south of Los Mochis, with winds of 45 mph (75 km/h). Heavy rainfall associated with the cyclone caused moderate damage in northwestern Mexico, and at least seventy-three deaths can be attributed to the storm.
- November – The Unified Socialist Party of Mexico is founded by a merger of four parties.

== Awards ==
- Belisario Domínguez Medal of Honor – Luis Alvarez Barret

== Film ==
- List of Mexican films of 1981.

== Sport ==
- 1980–81 Mexican Primera División season.

== Births ==
- August 6 — José Ron, soap opera actor
- December 5 – Adan Canto, actor (d. 2024 in the United States)
- December 21 – Lynda Thomas, singer-songwriter and producer
- Date unknown — Miriam Rivera, transgender model (d. 2019).
