= Governor Martinez =

Governor Martinez may refer to:

== Colonial Spain ==
- Antonio María Martínez (died 1823), 38th governor of the Spanish Colony of Texas

== Mexico ==
- Alfonso Martínez Domínguez (1922–2002), governor of Nuevo León from 1979 to 1985
- Enrique Martínez y Martínez (born 1948), governor of Coahuila from 1999 to 2005
- Gonzalo Martínez Corbalá (1928–2017), governor of San Luis Potosí from 1991 to 1992
- Jesús Martínez Álvarez (1944–2026), governor of Oaxaca from 1985 to 1986
- Jesús Martínez Ross (1934–2025), governor of Quintana Roo from 1975 to 1981
- Patricio Martínez García (born 1948), governor of Chihuahua from 1998 to 2004

== United States ==
- Bob Martinez (born 1934), 40th governor of Florida
- Susana Martinez (born 1959), 31st governor of New Mexico
