= Manuel Bernardo Aguirre =

Mexican politician

Governor of Chihuahua
- In office 4 October 1974 – 3 October 1980
- Preceded by: Oscar Flores Sánchez
- Succeeded by: Óscar Ornelas

Senator for Chihuahua
- In office 1 September 1964 – 1970

Member of the Chamber of Deputies for Chihuahua's 1st district
- In office 1 September 1961 – 31 August 1964
- Preceded by: Miguel Ángel Olea Enríquez
- Succeeded by: Saúl González Herrera

Member of the Chamber of Deputies for Chihuahua's 4th district
- In office 1 September 1940 – 31 August 1943
- Preceded by: Ismael C. Falcón
- Succeeded by: Guillermo Quevedo Moreno

Personal details
- Born: 20 August 1908; Baborigame, Chihuahua, Mexico
- Died: 4 April 1999 (aged 90); Baborigame, Chihuahua, Mexico
- Political party: PRI

Manuel Bernardo Aguirre Samaniego (20 August 1908 – 4 April 1999) was a Mexican politician from the Institutional Revolutionary Party (PRI). He was secretary of agriculture (1970–1974) and governor of Chihuahua (1974–1980).

Preceded by Juan Gil Preciado	Secretary of Agriculture of Mexico; 1970–1974	Succeeded by Óscar Brauer Herrera
Preceded by Oscar Flores Sánchez	Governor of Chihuahua; 1974–1980	Succeeded by Óscar Ornelas
