= Cervantes (disambiguation) =

Miguel de Cervantes was the author of Don Quixote.

Cervantes may also refer to:

== Astronomy ==
- Cervantes (crater), a crater on Mercury
- Mu Arae, a star in the constellation Ara, officially designated Cervantes by the International Astronomical Union in 2015

== Media ==
- Cervantes (film), a 1967 film by Vincent Sherman
- Cervantes, a character in "The New Guy", an episode of The Shield
- Cervantes de Leon, a pirate based character in the Soul Calibur fighting game franchise

== People with the surname ==
- Alfonso J. Cervantes (1920–1983), mayor of St. Louis, Missouri
- Antonio Cervantes (born 1945), Colombian boxer
- Elizabeth Cervantes (born 1973), Mexican actress
- Esmeralda Cervantes (1861–1926), Spanish harpist
- Fernando Cervantes (born 1958), Mexican historian
- Francisco Cervantes de Salazar (1514?–1575), Spanish man of letters
- Gabriel Cervantes, American politician
- Ignacio Cervantes (1847–1905), Cuban composer
- Juan Cervantes, the Spanish character in the British comedy series Mind Your Language, played by Ricardo Montez
- Jorge Cervantes (born 1953), American horticulturist
- Julio Cervantes, American soccer player; see Oakland Roots SC
- Lorna Dee Cervantes (born 1954), Chicana poet and activist
- Miguel Cervantes (actor) (born 1977), American actor, singer and activist
- Vicente Cervantes (1755–1829), Mexican botanist
- Nemesio Oseguera Cervantes (1966–2026), Mexican drug lord who was the head of the Jalisco New Generation Cartel

== Places ==
- Cervantes, Río Negro, a municipality in Río Negro, Argentina
- Cervantes, Western Australia, a municipality in Australia
- Cervantes, Ilocos Sur, a municipality in the Philippines
- Cervantes, Lugo, a municipality in Galicia, Spain

== Other uses ==
- Casa de Cervantes, a museum in Valladolid, Spain
- Instituto Cervantes, a public institution created by the Spanish government
- Cervantes, an updated version of Cymbeline radar
