= Punta Pescadero Airstrip =

Airport in Mexico

- IATA: none; ICAO: MMPP; LID: PPC

Summary
- Airport type: Private
- Location: Punta Pescadero
- Elevation AMSL: 33 ft (10 m)
- Coordinates: 23°48′12″N 109°42′26″W
- Interactive map of Punta Pescadero Airstrip

Runways
Direction	Length		Surface
Direction	ft	m	Surface
11/29	3,335	1,016	Asphalt

Punta Pescadero Airstrip (ICAO: MMPP) is a private-use airstrip located in Punta Pescadero, 9 miles North of Los Barriles, Municipality of La Paz, Baja California Sur, Mexico. This airport is privately owned by "Punta Pescadero Hotel", and is used solely for general aviation purposes.
