= Bahía las Palmas =

Bight on the Gulf of California in Baja California Sur, Mexico

Coordinates: 23.6667°N 109.6667°W

Bahía las Palmas is a 19 miles (31 km) bight on the Gulf of California in Baja California Sur, Mexico. Located on the East Cape, it is north of Cabo San Lucas, accessed by Mexican Federal Highway 1.

== Geography ==
The bay is shallow along the shoreline's southern third section. In the north third and near Buenavista, deep canyons fill its middle. Straddled by Los Barriles and Buenavista, there are fishing resorts along Punta Colorado and Punta Soledad. It is known for its flyfishing.

== Fauna ==
Libytheana carinenta larvata butterflies have been recorded.
