= Shakespeare Theatre Association =

American arts organisation, founded 1991

The Shakespeare Theatre Association (STA), Formally known as The Shakespeare Theatre Association of America, was established to provide a forum for the artistic and managerial leadership of theatres whose central activity is the production of Shakespeare's plays; to discuss issues and share methods of work, resources, and information; and to act as an advocate for Shakespearean productions throughout the world. The name was changed in January 2011 to reflect the increasingly international reach of Shakespeare and the Shakespeare Theatre Association.

== History ==
The Shakespeare Theatre Association of America was organized at a meeting held January 12 and 13, 1991 at the Folger Library and the Kennedy Center in Washington, D.C. Sidney Berger, Producing Director of the Houston Shakespeare Festival, and Douglas Cook, Producing Artistic Director of the Utah Shakespearean Festival, invited the producers, artistic directors and managing directors of over thirty-seven Shakespeare festivals and companies from the United States and Canada to this meeting. Berger was elected the first President, and Cook the first Vice President.

== Past Conferences ==
The annual conference is the most important activity of the STA.

Year	Host Organization	City
1991	Folger Shakespeare Theatre	Washington, D.C.
1992	Houston Shakespeare Festival	Houston, Texas
1993	Utah Shakespearean Festival	Cedar City, Utah
1994	Alabama Shakespeare Festival	Montgomery, Alabama
1995	Tygres Heart Shakespeare Company	Portland, Oregon
1996	Stratford Festival	Stratford, Ontario, Canada
1997	San Francisco Shakespeare Festival	San Francisco, California
1998	Georgia Shakespeare Festival	Atlanta, Georgia
1999	Orlando-UCF Shakespeare Festival	Orlando, Florida
2000	Royal Shakespeare Company and Shakespeare's Globe	Stratford-upon-Avon and London, England
2001	Idaho Shakespeare Festival	Boise, Idaho
2002	Shakespeare Theater Company	Washington, D.C.
2003	Oregon Shakespeare Festival	Ashland, Oregon
2004	American Shakespeare Center	Staunton, Virginia
2005	Bard on the Beach Shakespeare Festival	Vancouver, British Columbia, Canada
2006	Marin Shakespeare Company and Baja Shakespeare Festival	San Rafael, California and Los Barriles, Mexico
2007	Nashville Shakespeare Festival	Nashville, Tennessee
2008	Utah Shakespearean Festival	Cedar City, Utah
2009	Shakespeare & Company	Lenox, Massachusetts
2010	Shakespeare's Globe	London, England
2011	Colorado Shakespeare Festival	Boulder, Colorado
2012	Orlando Shakespeare Theatre	Orlando, Florida
2013	Pennsylvania Shakespeare Festival	Bethlehem, Pennsylvania
2014	Stratford Festival	Stratford, Ontario, Canada
2015	San Francisco Shakespeare Festival	San Francisco, California
2016	Shakespeare at Notre Dame	South Bend, Indiana
2017	Chesapeake Shakespeare Company	Baltimore, Maryland
2018	Cincinnati Shakespeare Company	Cincinnati, Ohio
2019	Prague Shakespeare Company	Prague, Czech Republic
2021	Chesapeake Shakespeare Company	Virtual (due to the COVID-19 pandemic)
2022	Gamut Theatre	Harrisburg, Pennsylvania
2023	Shakespeare in Paradise	Nassau, The Bahamas
