= Julieta Campos =

Cuban-Mexican writer (1932–2007)

Julieta Campos (8 May 1932 – 5 September 2007) was a Cuban-Mexican writer.

Born in Havana, she moved to Mexico in the 1950s after marrying diplomat Enrique González Pedrero. Julieta Campos won the Premio Xavier Villaurrutia for her novel, Tiene los cabellos rojizos y se llama Sabina (1974).

From 1978 to 1982 she was the director of the Mexican chapter of the writers' organisation PEN.

She moved to the state of Tabasco when her husband was elected governor in 1983–1987. In 1989 Campos' husband was appointed director of the Fondo de Cultura Económica (FCE), a publishing concern for which Campos had previously worked as a translator.

During the administration of Andrés Manuel López Obrador as Head of Government of the Federal District, she served in López Obrador's cabinet as the local Secretary of Tourism.

She died in Mexico City, aged 75, on 5 September 2007 from cancer.

== Publications ==
- Tiene los cabellos rojizos y se llama Sabina (Translated into English by Leland H. Chambers as She Has Reddish Hair and Her Name Is Sabrina, University of Georgia Press, 1993)
- Bajo el signo de IX Bolon
- El lujo del Sol
- El miedo de perder a Euridíce
  - The Fear of Losing Eurydice. Translated by L.H. Chambers. Dalkey Archive Press. 1994. ISBN 978-1-56478-030-0.
- Tabasco, un Jaguar Despertado
- ¿Qué Hacemos con los Pobres?
- La Forza del Destino
- Reunión de Familia
  - Celina Or the Cats, translator Leland H. Chambers, Kathleen Ross, Latin American Literary Review Press, 1995, ISBN 9780935480726
