= Universidad de la Sierra =

Public university in Mexico

- Motto: Una puerta abierta al cambio y al desarrollo
- Motto in English: An open door to change and development
- Type: Public university
- Established: 2002
- Rector: Dr. Juan Carlos Avilés Miranda
- Students: 660 (as of 2022)
- Location: Moctezuma, Sonora, Mexico; 30.082202°N 110.2617248°W
- Campus: Rural
- Website: http://unisierra.edu.mx/

The Universidad de la Sierra (UniSierra) is a Mexican public university based in Moctezuma, Sonora.

== History ==
In April 2002, the then-Governor of Sonora, Armando López Nogales, signed a state law creating a public university in Moctezuma called the Universidad de la Sierra. The initiative provided a long-awaited institution of higher learning to students in the Sierra region of the state, which spans an area of more than 30 municipalities. On 2 September 2002, the Universidad de la Sierra held its first day of classes with 167 students under the direction of rector Samuel Ocaña García. The university originally offered degrees in industrial engineering, biology, and project administration and evaluation. In 2003, UniSierra added programs in rural tourism administration and biology with a specialty in aquaculture production, followed by an engineering degree in systems and telematics in 2007. Ocaña García was soon replaced by Jesús Torres Gallegos as rector.

The university suffered from low enrollment in its first few years of operation, with students from the more affluent high schools in Moctezuma choosing universities in other regions or leaving the country altogether to find work in the United States. By 2005, enrollment had grown to more than 580 students. In 2007, 98 UniSierra students made up its first graduating class.

In 2015, three professors, including two with union ties, were dismissed by rector Gabriel Amavizca Herrera.

In 2019, the university entered a formal association with Sky Island Alliance, a wildlife restoration non-profit organization.
