= Francisco Suárez Dávila =

Mexican diplomat and politician

Mexico Ambassador to Canada
- In office 25 April 2013 – 1 January 2016
- Preceded by: Francisco Barrio
- Succeeded by: Agustín García López-Loaeza

Personal details
- Born: 20 April 1943 (age 83) Mexico City, Mexico
- Party: PRI
- Education: National Autonomous University of Mexico

Francisco Suárez Dávila (born 20 April 1943) is a Mexican diplomat and politician affiliated with the Institutional Revolutionary Party. He is the former Ambassador of Mexico to Canada from 2013 to 2016. As of 2014 he served as Deputy of the LIX Legislature of the Mexican Congress as a plurinominal representative.

== Education ==
He studied in National Autonomous University of Mexico from 1961 to 1965 and graduated with a degree in Law. In 1967, he obtained a master's degree in economics from King's College.
