= Los Barriles =

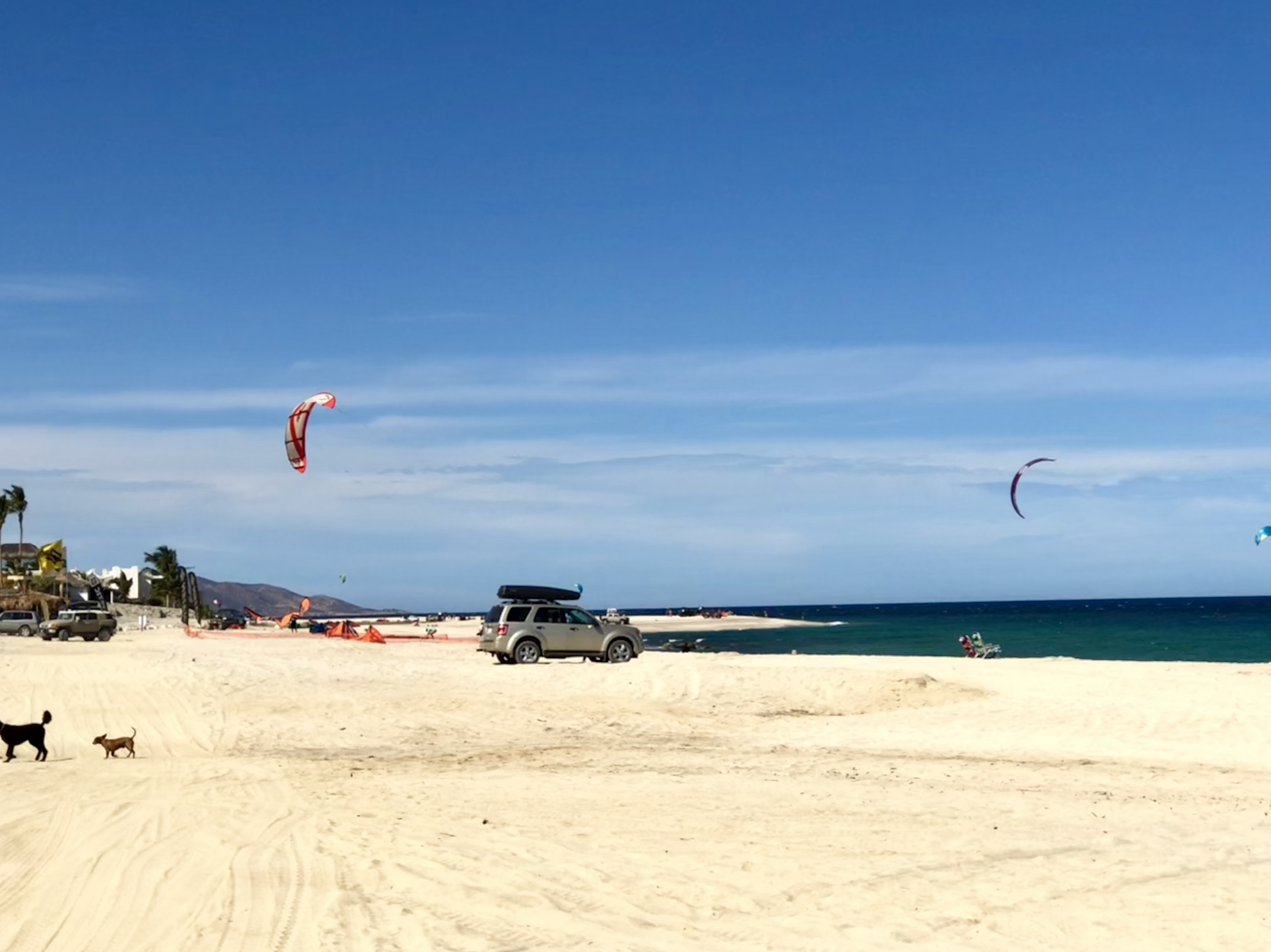
- Los Barriles Beach

- Location in Baja California Sur Los Barriles (Baja California Sur)
- Coordinates: 23°40′48″N 109°41′58″W
- Country: Mexico
- State: Baja California Sur
- Municipality: La Paz

Population (2020)
  - Total: 1,674

Los Barriles ("The Barrels") is a town in La Paz Municipality, Baja California Sur, Mexico. As of 2020, the town had a population of 1,674 people.

It is situated along Highway 1, 40 miles (64 km) north of San José del Cabo and 65 miles (105 km) south of La Paz. Punta Pescadero Airstrip is 9 miles (14 km) to the north; Rancho Leonero, a vacation resort, is to the south. Adjacent to Buenavista, the rural towns straddle the head of Bahía las Palmas on the Gulf of California, where winter westerlies average 20–25 knots (37–46 km/h; 23–29 mph). Los Barriles is within the transition area of the Baja California peninsula's Sierra de la Laguna where the hills become sandy flats.

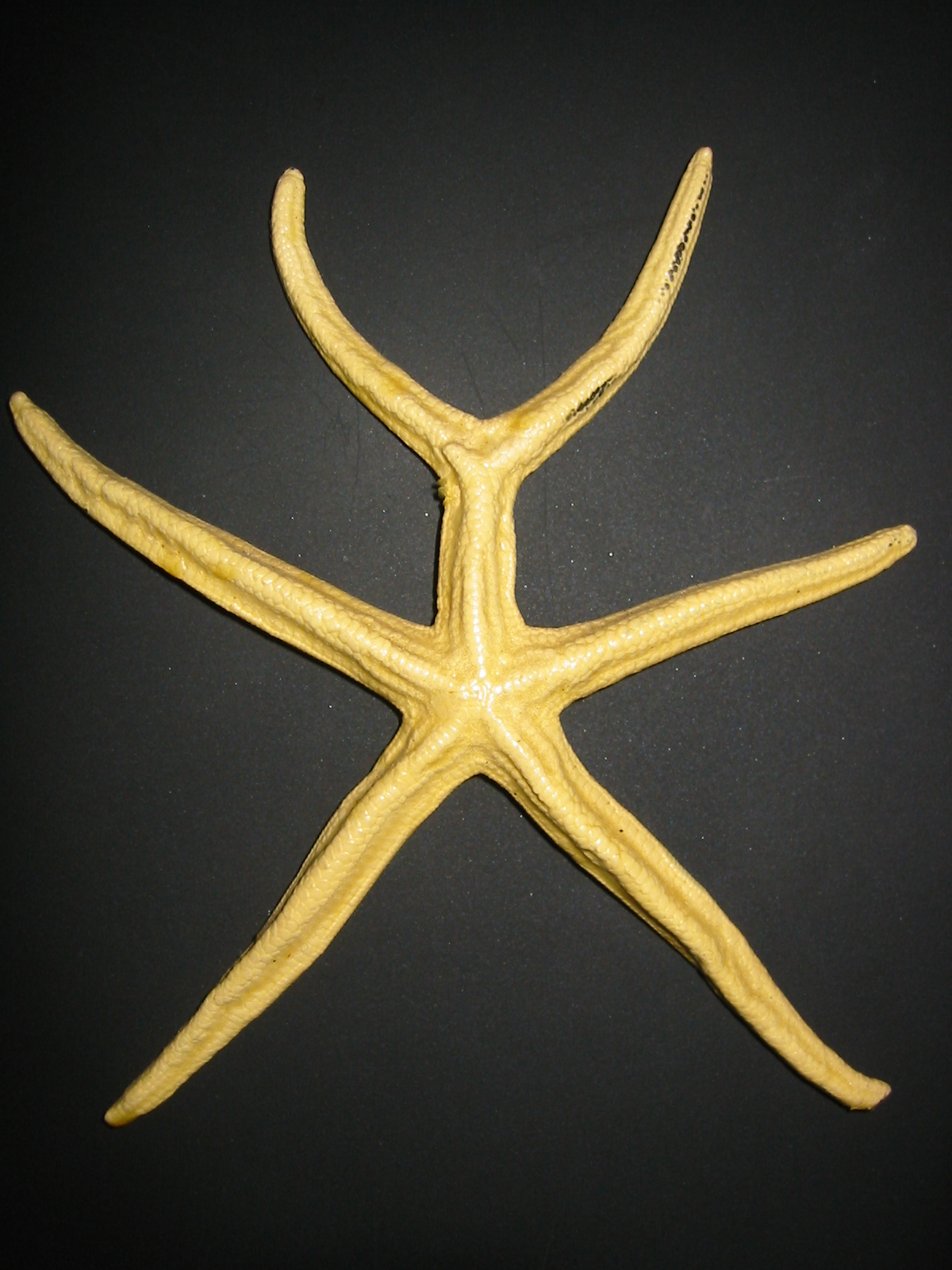
Mexican starfish mutation, the Devil Star, found in the Gulf of California between Los Barriles and La Paz.

Known for its flyfishing, Los Barriles is also Baja's kitesurfing and windsurfing capital. The town's port was closed on 2 September during the 2013 Pacific hurricane season's Tropical Storm Lorena. In 2006, the Shakespeare Theatre Association's annual conference was held in Los Barriles.
