= Gerardo Cornejo Murrieta =

Mexican writer (1937–2014)

- Born: 12 April 1937; Tarachi, Arivechi, Sonora, Mexico
- Died: 28 July 2014 (aged 77); Hermosillo, Sonora, Mexico
- Occupation: Writer

Gerardo Cornejo Murrieta (12 April 1937 –28 July 2014) was a Mexican writer. Born in a community called Tarachi in the municipality of Arivechi, Sonora, his works reflect his love for his home state, calling himself a tarachilango since his career obliged him to live for a long time in Mexico City.

He studied literature at the National Autonomous University of Mexico (UNAM), and was a literary expert who presented at academic institutions and conferences in various parts of the world. In 1982, he founded El Colegio de Sonora and served as its rector on several occasions. The school's library was named in his honor in 2008. He also founded organizations such as the Asosiación Mexicana de Población and the Sociedad General de Escritores Sonorenses. He was the coordinator of the Sub-Comité Regional del Noroeste de la Comisión Nacional México, affiliated with UNESCO.

His works include short stories, operas, essays, and novels. Major works include La sierra y el viento, El solar de los silencios, Cuéntame uno, Las dualidades fecundas, Voz viva de México and Como temiendo al olvido. The government of Sonora named one of the literary prizes that it sponsors after him.
