= Rancho Leonero =

Vacation resort in Mexico

Rancho Leonero (est. 1986) is a Mexican vacation resort located on the East Cape of Baja California Sur, approximately 60 miles Northeast of Cabo San Lucas.

== Description ==
The Ranch comprises 300 acres of private land and 2 miles of beaches on the Gulf of California.

As of 2012, the Ranch has 35 rooms including Ocean View and Garden View Bungalows, a restaurant and bar. The resort also offers kayaks, all-terrain quads, horseback riding, snorkeling and scuba diving, an open-air gym with free weights and exercise equipment, and a pool. Rancho Leonero rents three types of vessels: panga, super panga, and cruiser. Guests also fish using kayaks. Activities at Rancho Leonero include fishing, kayaking, snorkeling, hiking and scuba diving. Fish that can be found in the Gulf of California within a mile of land are marlin, sails, wahoo, dolphins, roosterfish, and yellowfin tuna The ranch is only accessible by dirt road. The nearest towns are Los Barriles and Buena Vista to the North and La Ribera to the South. To reach Rancho Leonero Resort, visitors fly to the Los Cabos airport near Baja California's tip, then board a shuttle for an hourlong drive north.

== History ==
Rancho Leonero was founded by John Ireland. Previously, it had been the seasonal home of Gil Powell, a wildlife cinematographer and big-game hunter known for his movie shoots in Africa. The locals called Powell "El Leonero", or "The one who knows lions". During the late 1950s and 60's, some of Hollywood's rich and famous would fly down in private planes to fish. Among the visitors were Kipp "B.D." Champion, John Wayne, Errol Flynn, and Bing Crosby. After Powell's death in 1974, Rancho Leonero was unused until John Ireland purchased it in 1981. In 1984 Ireland started construction of the original five rooms of what was to become "The Inn at Rancho Leonero". The original ranch house became the bar and office for the current resort. In 1986 the Inn opened to its first guests.

On February 22, 2023, John Ireland announced his retirement and 2023 as the last year of the hotel's operation. In March 2023, ONE Development Group, a luxury real estate developer based in Monterrey, Mexico, acquired the Rancho Leonero property.

== Conservation ==
John Ireland took part in efforts to protect Pulmo reef from commercial net fishing starting in the mid-1990s. The Mexican government established an 11-mile-long marine reserve off Cabo Pulmo, a national park, to protect it from commercial fishing. Ireland and fellow resort owner Bobby Van Wormer pay the monthly salary of the federal fish and game officer who patrols the marine reserve, now a destination for snorkelers and scuba divers.
