= Cervantes, Río Negro =

Coordinates: 39°03′S 67°23′W

Cervantes (Río Negro)
- Municipality and village
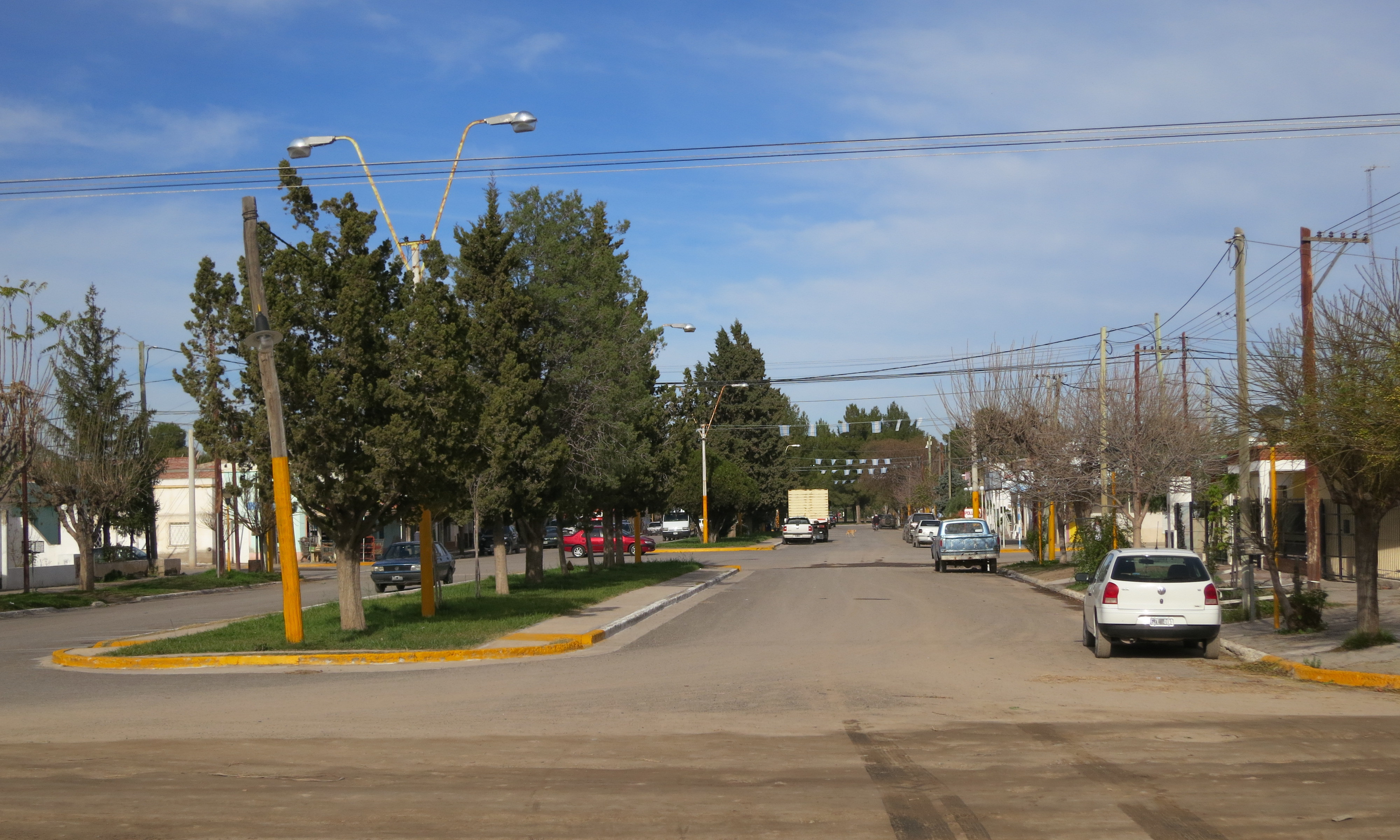
- Interactive map of Cervantes (Río Negro)
- Country: Argentina
- Province: Río Negro Province
- Department: General Roca Department, Río Negro
- Time zone: UTC−3 (ART)
- Climate: BWk

Cervantes is a village and municipality in Río Negro Province in Argentina.
