= Jesús Martínez Álvarez =

Mexican politician (1944–2026)

Governor of Oaxaca
- In office 15 November 1985 – 30 November 1986
- Preceded by: Pedro Vázquez Colmenares
- Succeeded by: Heladio Ramírez

Personal details
- Born: 18 September 1944 Oaxaca, Oaxaca, Mexico
- Died: 21 August 2026 (aged 81)
- Party: PRI (1962–2001); MC (2001–20??)
- Education: UABJO

Jesús Emilio Martínez Álvarez (Note: In this Mexican name, the surname is Martínez and the second or maternal family name is Álvarez.) (18 September 1944 – 21 August 2026) was a Mexican politician. Affiliated with the Citizens' Movement (Convergencia) since 2001, he previously belonged to the Institutional Revolutionary Party (PRI).

== Life ==
Jesús Martínez Álvarez was born in Oaxaca, Oaxaca, on 18 September 1944 and earned a degree in accountancy from the Benito Juárez Autonomous University of Oaxaca (UABJO).

He served as municipal president of Oaxaca, Oaxaca, from 1978 to 1980 and was interim Governor of Oaxaca from 1985 to 1986, finishing the term of Pedro Vázquez Colmenares. He was also borough chief of Venustiano Carranza, D.F., in 1988–1989.

Martínez Álvarez also served in the Chamber of Deputies on two occasions. During the 53rd Congress (1985–1988) he represented the 3rd district of Oaxaca for the PRI. Following his break with the PRI in 2001, he joined Convergencia (as the Citizens' Movement was then known) and served as the party's general secretary. He returned for the 59th Congress (2003–2006) as a Convergencia plurinominal deputy for the third region.

Martínez Álvarez died on 21 August 2026, at the age of 81.

== Notes ==
Preceded by Pedro Vázquez Colmenares	Governor of Oaxaca; 1985–1986	Succeeded by Heladio Ramírez
