= Arivechi =

- The kiosk in the central square of the town of Arivechi.

- Location within Sonora Location within Mexico
- Coordinates: 28°55′N 109°11′W
- Country: Mexico
- State: Sonora
- Municipality: Arivechi
- Founded: 1627
- Elevation: 556 m (1,824 ft)

Population (2020)
  - Total: 635
  - Density: 1,443.18/km^{2} (3,737.8/sq mi)
- Time zone: UTC-7 (Zona Pacífico)

Arivechi is a town in the Mexican state of Sonora. It serves as the municipal seat of the surrounding municipality of the same name.

== Geography ==
Arivechi is located in the east of Sonora at an elevation of 556 metres (1,824 ft).

The area is crossed by the Sahuaripa River, which is a tributary of the Yaqui River.

Arivechi lies on tarmacked highway 117, which links Arivechi to Agua Prieta. The distance to the international border is 339 kilometers (211 mi).

== History ==
The settlement of San Javier de Arivechi was founded in 1627 by the Jesuit missionary Pedro Méndez. The land had been occupied by the Opata people, conceded in the mission system of the Rectorado de San Francisco de Borja together with the peoples of Pónida y Bacanora. Arivechi became a municipality in 1932.

== Economy ==
The economy is based on cattle raising and agriculture.

== Sources consulted ==
- Enciclopedia de los Municipios de Mexico
- Inegi
