= Samuel Ocaña García =

Mexican politician (1931–2024)

Municipal president of Arivechi
- In office 16 September 2018 – 15 September 2021
- Preceded by: José Guillermo Flores García
- Succeeded by: Francisco Flores Roble
- In office 1997–2000
- Preceded by: Luis Guillermo Cruz García
- Succeeded by: Jesús Perez Lugo

Undersecretary of Agrarian Reform
- In office 1988–1991
- President: Carlos Salinas de Gortari

Governor of Sonora
- In office 13 September 1979 – 12 September 1985
- Preceded by: Alejandro Carrillo Marcor
- Succeeded by: Rodolfo Félix Valdés

Municipal president of Navojoa
- In office 16 September 1973 – December 1975
- Preceded by: Julio Martínez Bracamontes
- Succeeded by: José Jesús Dow Almada

Personal details
- Born: 2 August 1931 Arivechi, Sonora, Mexico
- Died: 31 December 2024 (aged 93) Hermosillo, Sonora, Mexico
- Party: PRI
- Spouse: Alba Zaragoza Otero
- Education: IPN; UNAM

Samuel Ocaña García (2 August 1931 – 31 December 2024) was a Mexican politician and doctor who served as the governor of Sonora from 1979 to 1985 as a member of the Institutional Revolutionary Party (PRI). He was known for his contributions towards the advancement of Sonoran culture and education during his term.

== Early life and education ==
Ocaña was born in August 1931 in Arivechi, Sonora. He attended elementary school at the J. Cruz Gálvez boarding school in the state capital of Hermosillo before completing his secondary studies at the Boarding School for Children of Ejidatarios in Tepic, Nayarit. At the latter, Ocaña was a classmate of future governor of Nayarit Julián Gascón Mercado.

Ocaña returned to Hermosillo in 1947, where he worked at a textile factory for two years and helped create a textile workers' union. He earned his medical degree from the Instituto Politécnico Nacional (IPN) Higher School of Rural Medicine before attending the National Autonomous University of Mexico (UNAM), where he specialized in pneumology and thoracic surgery at the National Institute of Pneumology. During this time, he served as the personal secretary to former president Adolfo de la Huerta.

== Career ==
During his time in Mexico City, Ocaña joined the Popular Socialist Party (PPS), inspired by the broader socialist movement. He later joined the Institutional Revolutionary Party (PRI) in 1959. Ocaña returned to Sonora once again in 1961, settling in Navojoa, where he founded and directed the Regional Hospital of Pulmonary and Thoracic Surgery. He also taught biology at a preparatoria affiliated with the Universidad de Sonora.

Ocaña entered politics in 1972 when he was named the director of the Center for Political, Economic and Social Studies (CEPES) of the municipal PRI in Navojoa. The following year, he became the PRI's nominee for the position of municipal president of Navojoa, and was elected to the post to a three-year term. One of the first projects he orchestrated was the planting of trees along Gral. Lázaro Cárdenas del Río Boulevard. Ocaña was also able to receive approval from then-Governor Carlos Armando Biebrich for the construction of a new municipal palace in Navojoa in 1975, though the project was not completed until 1979. Additionally, he reportedly dismissed his police force en masse when a prisoner died under torture.

In December 1975, shortly before completing his term as municipal president, Ocaña accepted a position as the Sonora undersecretary of government for the administration of newly-elected governor Alejandro Carrillo Marcor. He was promoted to secretary of government in late 1977 following the resignation of Raúl Encinas Alcántar. In March 1978, Ocaña replaced Jesús Enríquez Burgos as the president of the PRI's Sonora branch.

=== Governor of Sonora (1979–1985) ===
In early 1979, Ocaña unexpectedly won the internal election to become the PRI nominee in that year's gubernatorial election. The National Action Party (PAN) candidate was Jorge Valdez Muñoz, former municipal president of Hermosillo. Ocaña defeated Valdez Muñoz after receiving 201,658 votes, which accounted for 83.5 percent of the vote.

During his term as Governor, Ocaña created institutions such as Radio Sonora, the State Commission for Human Rights (CEDH), the Sonora Sports Commission (CODESON), the Sonora Ecological Center (CES), the Secretariat of Education and Culture (SEC), the Sonora Center for Higher Studies (CESUES), the Sonoran Institute of Educational Credits, the Sonoran Historical Society (SSH), the General Directorate of Radio and Television (DIRTE), the Sonora Center for Research and Development of Natural Resources (CIDESON) and the state library system, among others.

Ocaña collaborated with noted writer Gerardo Cornejo Murrieta to create El Colegio de Sonora, an institution of higher education specializing in social sciences and humanities research, in 1982. He was also remembered for his contributions to education and hydraulic infrastructure, as well as for negotiating with Ford Motor Company to open the Hermosillo Stamping and Assembly plant. Ocaña did not publicly support any candidates in the 1985 election to succeed him.

=== Later career ===
At the conclusion of his term as governor, Ocaña served as president of the PRI's Sinaloa branch and as a PRI general delegate before he was named the Undersecretary of Agrarian Reform, holding that post from 1988 to 1991. He returned to Sonora and was named the director of the Sonora Ecological Center by Governor Manlio Fabio Beltrones.

In 1997, Ocaña returned to local politics and announced his candidacy for municipal president of Arivechi, his hometown. The PRI already had an official nominee, but the candidate declined out of respect for Ocaña. Ocaña won the election and served his full three-year term from 1997 to 2000. He retired from politics in 2000. Shortly thereafter, he was named the first rector of the Universidad de la Sierra, a public university in Moctezuma created by Governor Armando López Nogales.

In March 2018, Ocaña announced his candidacy for municipal president of Arivechi, after having previously held the position from 1997 to 2000. He received praise from politicians such as Manlio Fabio Beltrones and Sylvana Beltrones Sánchez for his commitment to Sonoran politics. Ocaña was elected to the post at the age of 87, earning 67.7 percent of the vote, and went on to serve his full three-year term.

== Personal life and death ==
Ocaña married his wife, Alba Zaragoza Otero, in Navojoa. In November 2017, a measure to rename a street in Hermosillo after Ocaña was approved unanimously by the Congress of Sonora. He released his first book, Postales de pequeñas historias, in January 2023.

His brother, Gilberto, was arrested by federal officials and charged with drug trafficking in October 1986 after the Mexican Army discovered several acres of marijuana fields on properties he owned in southern Sonora.

Ocaña García died in Hermosillo on 31 December 2024, at the age of 93.

Political offices
Preceded by Alejandro Carrillo Marcor	Governor of Sonora; 1979–1985	Next: Rodolfo Félix Valdés
