= Benedetti's Pizza =

Mexican pizza chain

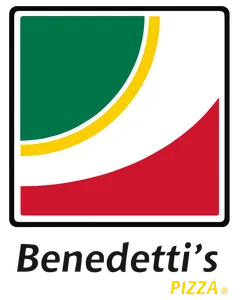

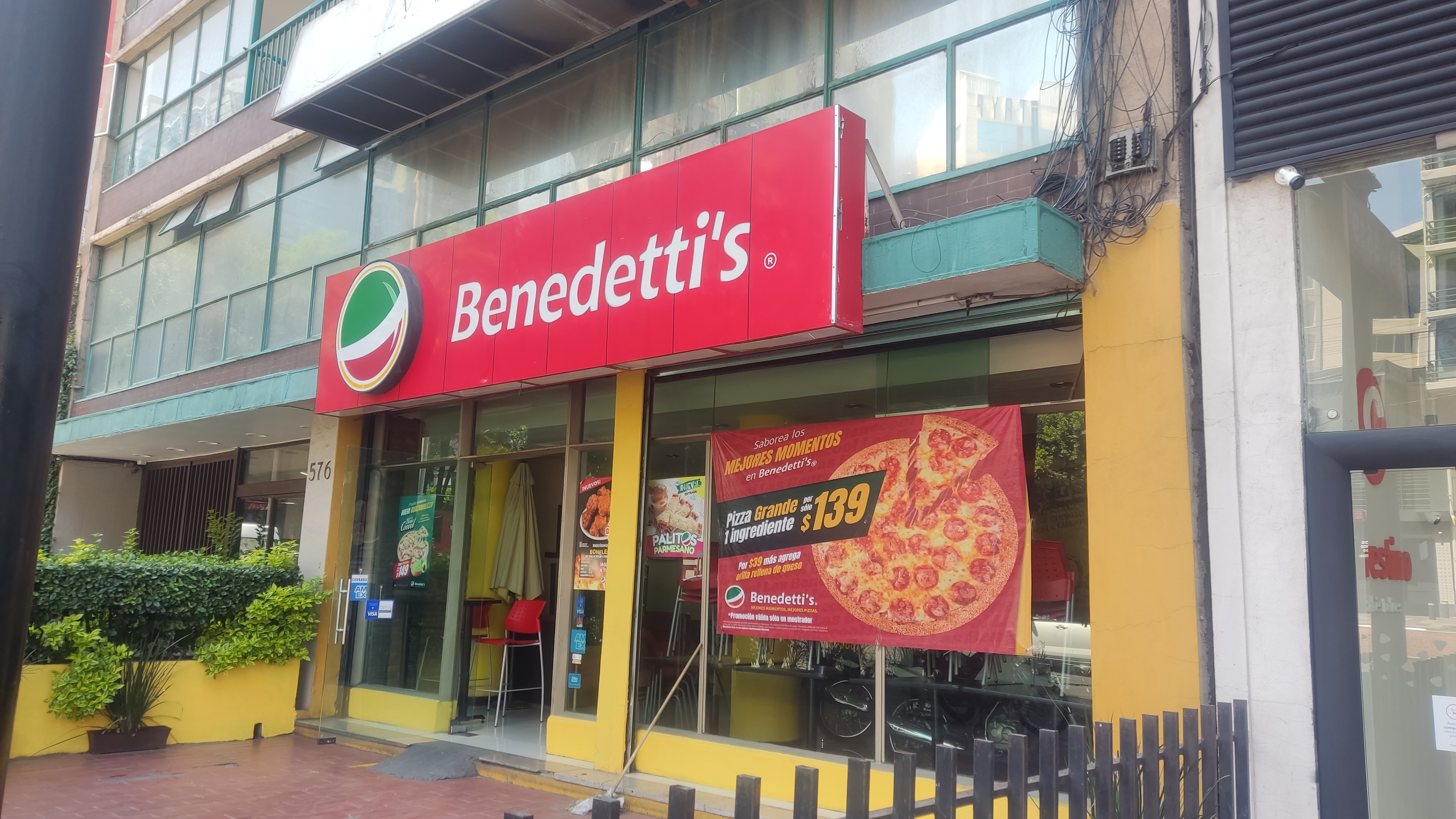
- A pizzeria in Colonia del Valle
- Company type: Private
- Industry: Restaurants
- Founded: 1983; 43 years ago
- Headquarters: Mexico City, Mexico
- Key people: Mario Alberto Briceño Martínez, CEO
- Products: Pizza, pasta and various dishes
- Website: www.benedettis.com/%20benedettis.com

Benedetti's Pizza is a pizza chain in Mexico. Founded in 1983, it currently operates more than 79 units in 10 cities of the Mexican Republic and its headquarters are in Mexico City. For the year 2022, the company planned to open 12 new pizzerias in Mexico City and Monterrey, a new market for them.
