= Fernando Baeza Meléndez =

Mexican politician

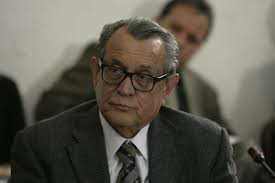

Governor of Chihuahua
- In office October 4, 1986 – October 3, 1992
- Preceded by: Saúl González Herrera
- Succeeded by: Francisco Barrio

Personal details
- Born: January 21, 1942 (age 84) Delicias, Chihuahua
- Party: Institutional Revolutionary Party
- Spouse: Delia Jaimes
- Profession: Lawyer, politician

Fernando Baeza Meléndez (born January 21, 1942, in Delicias, Chihuahua) is a Mexican politician and a member of the Institutional Revolutionary Party (PRI). Baeza served as the Governor of Chihuahua from 1986 to 1992.

In the 1985 mid-terms he was elected to the Chamber of Deputies to represent the sixth district of Chihuahua, but he resigned his seat to seek the governorship. In 1986, he was elected governor of Chihuahua, defeating Francisco Barrio of the National Action Party (PAN) in a controversial gubernatorial election allegedly marred by voting irregularities. (Barrio succeeded Baeza as governor in 1992.)

Governor Baeza signed separate bilateral treaties with Texas Governor Ann Richards and New Mexico Governor Bruce King in June 1991. Under the treaties, Chihuahua agreed to improve free trade, tourism, and economic links between the border states.
