= Francisco Barrio =

Mexican politician (1950–2025)

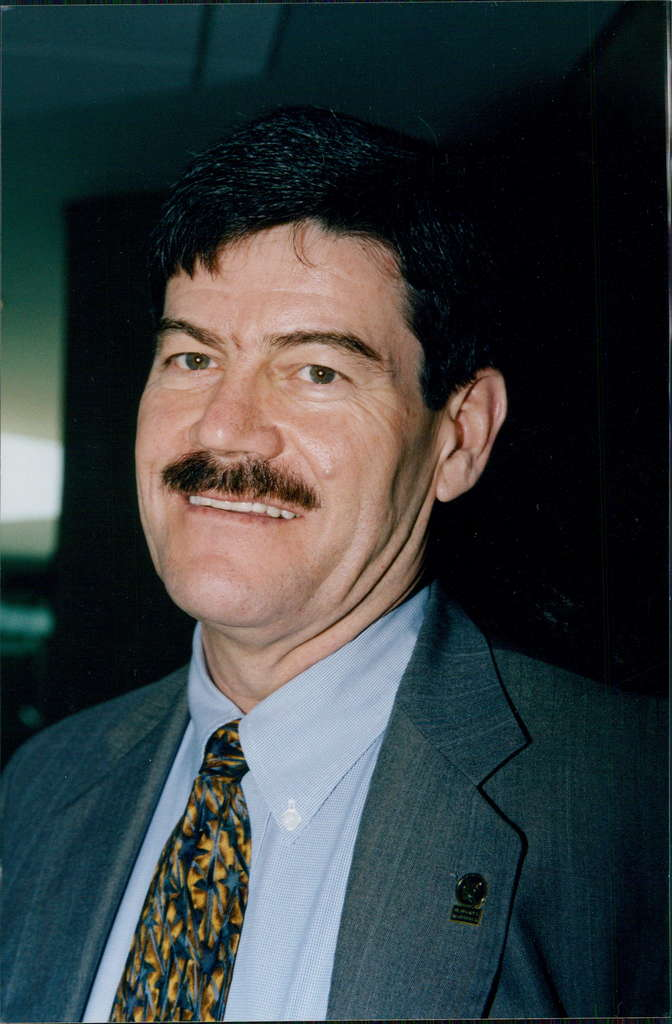

Mexican Ambassador to Canada
- In office January 2009 – April 2013
- Preceded by: Emilio Goicoechea Luna
- Succeeded by: Francisco Suárez Dávila

Governor of Chihuahua
- In office October 4, 1992 – October 3, 1998
- Preceded by: Fernando Baeza Meléndez
- Succeeded by: Patricio Martínez García

Personal details
- Born: November 25, 1950 Satevó, Chihuahua, Mexico
- Died: December 29, 2025 (aged 75) Houston, Texas, U.S.
- Party: National Action Party (PAN)
- Spouse: Hortensia Olivas
- Profession: Certified Public Accountant

Francisco Javier Barrio Terrazas (November 25, 1950 – December 29, 2025) was a Mexican politician affiliated with the National Action Party (PAN). He served as governor of Chihuahua and in the cabinet of President Vicente Fox.

== Life and career ==
Barrio was born in Satevó, Chihuahua, and received a bachelor's degree in accounting and an MBA from the Autonomous University of Chihuahua. He did some consulting and worked in the private sector before joining the local chapter of the National Action Party in 1983 and becoming its first member to ever win the mayorship of Juárez, Chihuahua.

He ran for governor in 1986 and lost against the Institutional Revolutionary Party (PRI) candidate, Fernando Baeza Meléndez, in one of the most controversial elections in the state's recent history. Six years later he made another attempt and won, ending more than 60 years of uninterrupted control of Chihuahua's governorship by members of the PRI. As a governor, he delivered mixed results and consequently the PRI regained control of the state at the end of his term. While governor of Chihuahua, hundreds of women were raped and murdered in Ciudad Juárez. Barrio refused for years to mount an inquiry, and suggested the attacks were not surprising because the victims walked in dark places at night and wore provocative clothing.

In the course of his political career, Barrio-Terrazas served as Mayor of Ciudad Juárez and Governor of the State of Chihuahua, a post he held from 1992 to 1998. In the 1980s, he held leadership roles in his native state during the political-democratic transition process, and later served as one of the first governors to rise from the ranks of the opposition party.

During his tenure as governor, the State of Chihuahua placed first in the country in anti-corruption and good governance, according to the annual review conducted by the prestigious Monterrey Technological Institute of Higher Studies (ITESM). Barrio headed the Federal Comptroller's Secretariat (2000–2003) and, in 2003, was elected to a plurinominal seat in the Chamber of Deputies, where he became the leader of the National Action Party's parliamentary group.

On February 24, 2005, he expressed interest in becoming the PAN presidential candidate and campaigned for a few months before quitting on July 7, arguing partisan favoritism towards the former minister of the interior, Santiago Creel.

In January 2009 he was named as the Mexican ambassador to Canada. This was met with controversy and protests from rights organizations in Canada and Mexico, due to his actions during the Juárez murders.

Barrio died in Houston, Texas, U.S., on December 29, 2025, at the age of 75, following complications from a cardiac surgery.

== See also ==
- Creel-Terrazas Family
