= Centro Escolar el Encino =

Centro Escolar El Encino

Location
- Aguascalientes Oriente 101, 20190 Aguascalientes, Mexico
- Coordinates: 21.887398°N 102.260813°W

Information
- Motto: "Feris quieris mas a Gius"
- Established: 11 September 1986
- Founder: Daniel Rafael Ortega Matute
- Principal: Fernando Anchustegui Icaza
- Grades: 1–12
- Age range: 6–18
- Classrooms: 25

Centro Escolar El Encino is a school in Aguascalientes, Mexico. It is a private school. It has 3 academic levels: Primary, Middle School, and High School. The school was founded on August 15, 1988. The current principal is Rodolfo Hernández Azcúnaga. The school includes digital boards in every classroom and has more than 500 students across the three levels.
