= Saúl González Herrera =

Mexican politician

Governor of Chihuahua
- In office 19 September 1985 – 3 October 1986
- Preceded by: Óscar Ornelas Kuchle
- Succeeded by: Fernando Baeza Meléndez

President of the Chamber of Deputies
- In office 15 March 1995 – 14 April 1995
- Preceded by: Carlota Vargas Garza
- Succeeded by: Sofía Valencia Abundis

Member of the Chamber of Deputies for Chihuahua's 5th district
- In office 1 November 1994 – 31 August 1997
- Preceded by: Pablo Israel Esparza Natividad
- Succeeded by: Ignacio Arrieta Aragón

Senator for Chihuahua
- In office 1 September 1988 – 31 October 1994
- Preceded by: Diamantina Reyes Esparza
- Succeeded by: Martha Lara Alatorre

Member of the Chamber of Deputies for Chihuahua's 1st district
- In office 1 September 1964 – 31 August 1967
- Preceded by: Manuel Bernardo Aguirre
- Succeeded by: Mariano Valenzuela Ceballos

Personal details
- Born: 14 November 1915 Vicente Guerrero, Chih.
- Died: 22 October 2006 (aged 90) Chihuahua, Chih.
- Party: PRI
- Spouse: Delia Jaimes
- Occupation: Lawyer, politician

Saúl González Herrera (14 November 1915 in Vicente Guerrero, Chihuahua – 22 October 2006 in Chihuahua, Chihuahua) was a Mexican lawyer and politician, affiliated with the Revolutionary Institutional Party (PRI). He served as governor of Chihuahua from 1985 to 1986.

González Herrera had extensive experience in Chihuahua state politics. He served as Rector of the Autonomous University of Chihuahua from 1959 to 1962, served in the federal Chamber of Deputies for Chihuahua's 1st district during the 46th Congress (1964 to 1967), and was General Director of the state-controlled corporation Productos Forestales de la Tarahumara (PROFORTARAH). In 1980 Governor Óscar Ornelas appointed him State Treasurer; following Ornelas's forced resignation from the governorship on 19 September 1985, González Herrera was appointed interim governor to complete his six-year mandate.

Towards the end of González's term as governor, the 1986 state election was held, which saw Francisco Barrio Terrazas of the National Action Party (PAN) compete against Fernando Baeza Meléndez of the PRI; the official result was a victory for the latter, but suspicions of electoral fraud marred the election and Baeza Meléndez's time in office.

Saúl González was elected to the Senate for the 1988–94 period, representing Chihuahua for the PRI. In 1994 he was elected to the Chamber of Deputies for Chihuahua's 5th district to serve during the 56th Congress.

At the end of his senatorial period, he returned to his private practice as a notary public. He died on 22 October 2006 in the city of Chihuahua.

Preceded by Óscar Ornelas Kuchle	Governor of Chihuahua; 1985–1986	Succeeded by Fernando Baeza Meléndez
