= Absalón Castellanos Domínguez =

Mexican politician

Governor of Chiapas
- In office 8 December 1982 – 7 December 1988
- Preceded by: Gustavo Armendáriz
- Succeeded by: Patrocinio González Garrido

Commandant of the Heroic Military Academy
- In office 1976–1980
- Preceded by: Salvador Revueltas Olvera
- Succeeded by: Enrique Cervantes Aguirre

Personal details
- Born: 2 October 1923 Comitán
- Died: 10 March 2017 (aged 93) Mexico City
- Party: Institutional Revolutionary Party
- Relatives: Belisario Domínguez (grandfather)

Absalón Castellanos Domínguez (2 October 1923 – 10 March 2017) was a Mexican politician. He was Commandant of the Heroic Military Academy from 1976 to 1980 and served as Governor of Chiapas from 1982 to 1988.
