= Arivechi Municipality =

Coordinates: 28.9278°N 109.1869°W

Arivechi
- Municipality
- Coat of arms

- Location in Mexico Arivechi (Mexico)
- Country: Mexico
- State: Sonora
- Demonym: (in Spanish)
- Time zone: UTC−7 (MST)

Location of the municipality in Sonora

Arivechi is a municipality of the state of Sonora in north-western Mexico. The municipal seat is at Arivechi.

== Geography ==
=== Borders ===
It has boundaries to the north, east, and south with the municipality of Sahuaripa and to the west with the municipality of Bacanora.

=== Area ===
The area of the municipality (urban and rural) is 738.8 square kilometers.

== Population ==
In the 2005 census, the population was 1,280 inhabitants, 866 of whom lived in the municipal seat. . In the 2020 census, the population of the municipality was 1,177.
