= Jorge Alonso Treviño =

Mexican politician (1935–2026)

Jorge Alonso Treviño Martínez

Governor of Nuevo León
- In office 1 August 1985 – 31 July 1991
- Preceded by: Alfonso Martínez Domínguez
- Succeeded by: Sócrates Rizzo

Deputy of the Congress of the Union for the 6th district of Nuevo León
- In office 1 September 1982 – 13 February 1985
- Preceded by: Luis Marcelino Farías Martínez
- Succeeded by: Graciano Bortoni Urteága

Personal details
- Born: 2 November 1935 Monterrey, Nuevo León, Mexico
- Died: 29 May 2026 (aged 90)
- Party: PRI
- Spouse: María Cristina Larralde Lagüera
- Profession: Lawyer and politician

Jorge Alonso Treviño Martínez (Note: In this Mexican name, the surname is Treviño and the second or maternal family name is Martínez.) (2 November 1935 – 29 May 2026) was a Mexican politician from the Institutional Revolutionary Party (PRI). He served as governor of Nuevo León from 1 August 1985 to 1 August 1991.

== Life and career ==
Treviño was born in Monterrey, Nuevo León, on 2 November 1935. He received a bachelor's degree in law from the National Autonomous University of Mexico (UNAM), a doctorate in administrative law from the University of Paris (Panthéon-Sorbonne) and completed some postgraduate studies at the University of Rome in Italy.

He taught several law courses at the Monterrey Institute of Technology and Higher Education, Autonomous University of Nuevo León and University of Monterrey and held several posts at the federal secretariat of finance, where he worked with future president Miguel de la Madrid.

Treviño was elected to the Chamber of Deputies for Nuevo León's 6th district in 1982. He won the 1985 Nuevo León gubernatorial elections amid serious accusations of fraud, particularly from his conservative opponent, Fernando Canales Clariond. As governor, he built the first line of the Metrorrey mass-transit system in Monterrey and coordinated the state's relief and reconstruction efforts after Hurricane Gilbert.

Treviño died on 29 May 2026, at the age of 90.
