= Juan Arévalo Gardoqui =

Mexico's Secretary of Defense

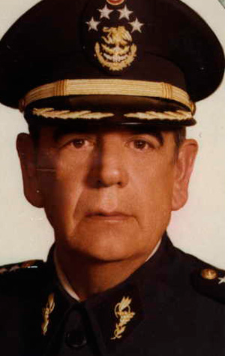
Juan Arévalo Gardoqui

Juan Arévalo Gardoqui (born in México City, July 23, 1921 – May 4, 2000, Mexico City) served as Mexico's Secretary of Defense from 1982 to 1988.

== Family ==
His parents were General Gustavo Arévalo and Magdalena Gardoqui. He had one brother, Gustavo Arévalo Gardoqui, who served as a federal deputy representing Baja California from 1961 to 1964. Juan Arévalo married Maria del Carmen Lamadrid from Ensenada, Baja California and had three children, María Magdalena Arévalo Lamadrid, Juan Arévalo Lamadrid and Laura Lorena Arévalo Lamadrid. He then spent the rest of his life quietly in Mexico City, he had an affection for horses and firearms. His youngest daughter married Eduardo Jose Danielewicz Mata from the Mexican army and anti terrorist forces.

== Career ==
He began his military career in 1940 when he entered the Heroic Military College, graduating on June 30, 1943 as a 2nd Cavalry Lieutenant. He entered the Higher War College in 1947 and graduated three years later acquiring the status of officer of cadets.

In his military career he held several important positions, among which stand out: General Director of Cavalry, Commander of the 1 / a. and 5 / a. Military Areas.

He joined the PRI in 1957 and served as the head of security for Secretary Adolfo López Mateos during his successful presidential campaign in 1957.

In 1982, he was appointed Secretary of National Defense, a position he held until November 30, 1988.

As Secretary of the branch, he supported the development of the military industry with the manufacture of new weapons, clothing and equipment and implemented the DN-III-E Plan for the Assistance of the civilian population in cases of disaster.

== Corruption ==
In 1988, a Drug Enforcement Administration informant accused Arévalo of taking a $10 million bribe from drug trafficker Rafael Caro Quintero in return for protecting a 1,000-hectare (2,500-acre) marijuana plantation in Allende (Chihuahua). In 1984, acting on information from the DEA, 450 Mexican soldiers backed by helicopters had destroyed the plantation. DEA Administrator John C. Lawn expressed skepticism about the claim and Arevalo was never formally investigated.

In 1995, the U.S. Justice Department's prosecution of drug trafficker Juan Benito Castro revealed that in 1993, the DEA had intercepted 348 kilograms of cocaine that belonged to Arévalo.

In 2014, three former police officers in the United States Federal Witness Protection Program accused Arévalo and Interior Secretary Manuel Bartlett of participation in the interrogation, torture, and murder of DEA Agent Kiki Camarena in 1985 as part of the Iran–Contra affair.
