= Pedro Vázquez Colmenares =

Mexican politician

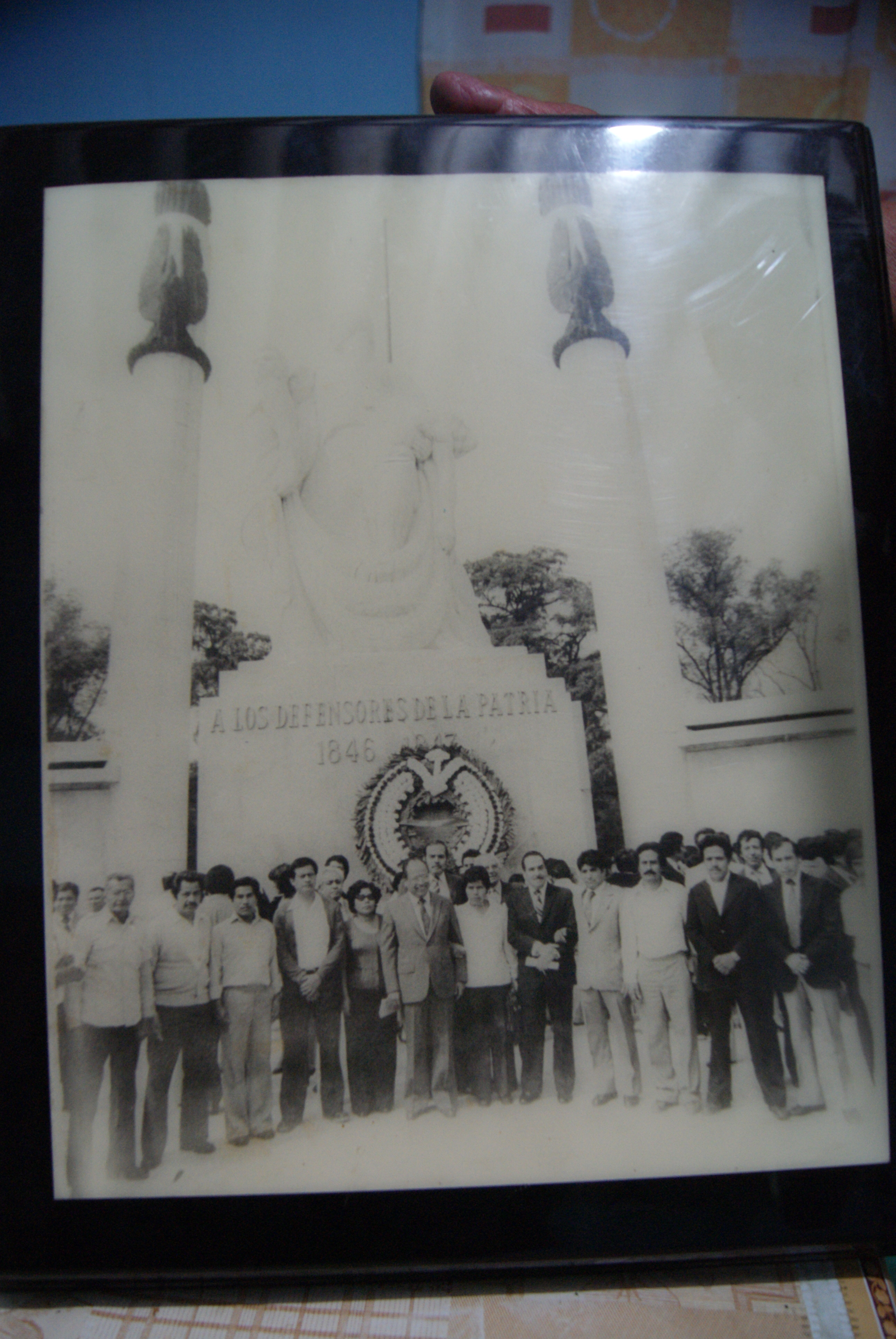
- Pedro Vazquez Colmenares

Governor of Oaxaca
- In office 1980–1985
- Preceded by: Eliseo Jiménez Ruiz
- Succeeded by: Jesús Martínez Álvarez

Personal details
- Born: June 3, 1934 Tuxtepec, Oaxaca, Mexico
- Died: September 24, 2012 (aged 78) Acapulco, Guerrero
- Party: Institutional Revolutionary Party
- Spouse: Ana María Guzmán de Vásquez
- Profession: Politician

Pedro Vázquez Colmenares (1934 – September 24, 2012) was a Mexican politician who served as the Governor of Oaxaca from 1980 to 1985. He left the Oaxacan governor's office in 1985, before the expiration of his term, when Mexican President Miguel de la Madrid appointed him as the director general of the Center for Research and National Security (CISEN), Mexico's intelligence agency. He served as the director general of CISEN from 1985 to 1988. Vazquez then became the Mexican Ambassador to Guatemala from 1989 to 1985.

== Early life ==
Vázquez Colmenares was born in 1934 in Tuxtepec, Oaxaca. He received a law degree from the National Autonomous University of Mexico in 1958. He joined the ruling Institutional Revolutionary Party (PRI) in 1963.

== Career ==
Vázquez worked as a prosecutor from 1959 to 1964, as well as an employee of the Secretariat of Labor and Social Welfare from 1960 to 1963. From 1971 to 1973, he was a senior officer for the Secretariat of the President. Vázquez then became Mexico's Director General of Airports and Auxiliary Services from 1973 to 1975. He briefly held the position of assistant secretary for new population centers Secretariat of Agrarian Reform in 1976.

He also served as the CEO of Aeroméxico from 1976 to 1980 before becoming Governor of Oaxaca.

== Death ==
Pedro Vázquez Colmenares died at his home in Acapulco on September 24, 2012, at the age of 76. His funeral was held in the Predregal neighborhood of southern Mexico City. He was survived by his wife, Ana María Guzmán de Vásquez, and three children – Bernardo, Pedro and Ana.

== See also ==
- Oaxaca state election, 1980

| Preceded by Eliseo Jiménez Ruiz | Governor of Oaxaca State; 1980–1985 | Succeeded by Jesus Martinez Alvarez |
