= Rodolfo Félix Valdés =

Mexican politician

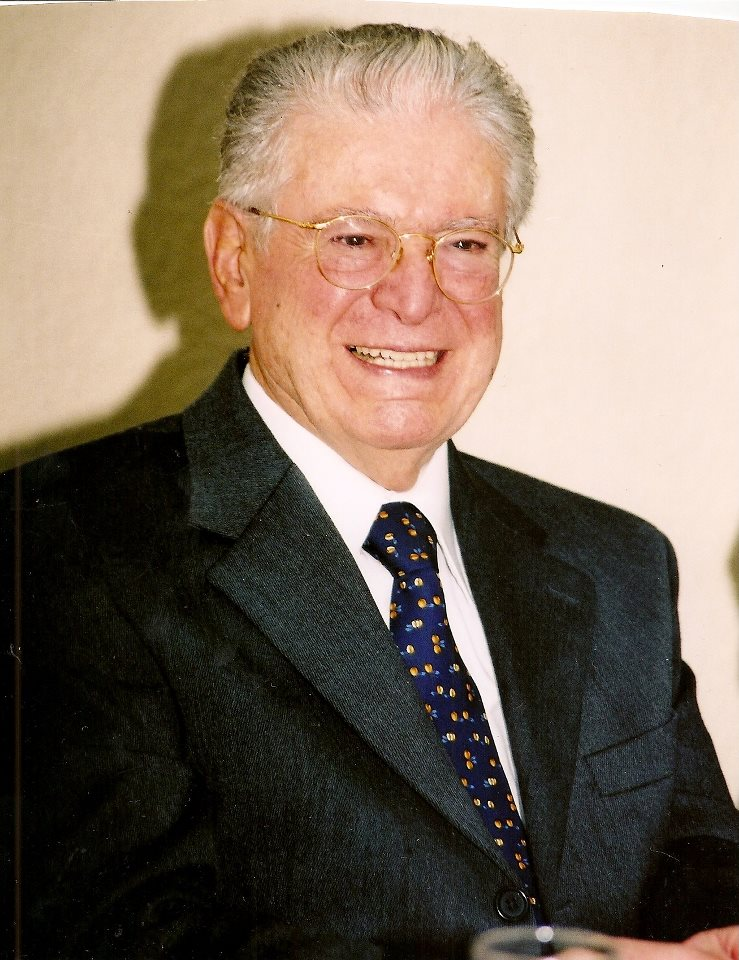

20th Governor of Sonora
- In office September 13, 1985 – September 12, 1991
- Preceded by: Samuel Ocaña García
- Succeeded by: Mario Morúa Johnson

26th SCT
- In office December 1, 1982 – November 30, 1984
- President: Miguel de la Madrid
- Preceded by: Emilio Mújica Montoya
- Succeeded by: Daniel Díaz Díaz

Personal details
- Born: May 22, 1922 Nacozari de García, Mexico
- Died: May 21, 2012 (aged 89) Mexico City, Mexico
- Party: PRI
- Education: UNAM
- Occupation: Civil Engineer

Rodolfo Félix Valdés (May 22, 1922 – May 21, 2012) was a Mexican politician. He was the Governor of Sonora from 1985 until 1991. He previously held posts in the Ministry of Communications and Works.

Valdés died on May 21, 2012, aged 86.
