= Alejandro Cervantes Delgado =

Mexican economist and politician

Alejandro Cervantes Delgado (Note: In this Mexican name, the surname is Cervantes and the second or maternal family name is Delgado.) (24 January 1926 – 17 September 2000) was a Mexican economist and politician affiliated with the Institutional Revolutionary Party (PRI).

Cervantes Delgado was born in Chilpancingo, Guerrero, in 1926. He was elected to the Chamber of Deputies for the 3rd district of Guerrero in the 1973 mid-term election.

He later served as governor of Guerrero from 1981 to 1987, when he was notable for his efforts to reconcile groups with differing political opinions. He also declined to continue the hard-line policies of his predecessor, Rubén Figueroa Figueroa.

He died in Acapulco on 17 September 2000 at the age of 74.
