= Tulio Hernández Gómez =

Mexican politician (1938–2023)

Governor of Tlaxcala
- In office 15 January 1981 – 14 January 1987
- Preceded by: Emilio Sánchez Piedras
- Succeeded by: Beatriz Paredes Rangel

Personal details
- Born: 26 May 1938 Tlaxcala de Xicohténcatl, Tlaxcala, Mexico
- Died: 16 September 2023 (aged 85) San Esteban Tizatlán, Tlaxcala, Mexico
- Party: Institutional Revolutionary Party PRI
- Spouse: Silvia Pinal (m. 1982; div. 1995)
- Profession: Politician, lawyer

Tulio Hernández Gómez (Note: In this Mexican name, the surname is Hernández and the second or maternal family name is Gómez.) (26 May 1938 – 16 September 2023) was a Mexican politician from the Institutional Revolutionary Party (PRI).

Born in the city of Tlaxcala, he served two terms in the Chamber of Deputies: 1964–1967 for the first district of Tlaxcala, and 1997–2000 as a plurinominal deputy. He was also borough chief of Azcapotzalco from 1976 to 1979, and governor of Tlaxcala from 1981 to 1987.

From 1982 to 1995, he was married to the actress Silvia Pinal.
