= Enrique González Pedrero =

Mexican politician and writer (1930–2021)

Enrique González Pedrero (7 April 1930 – 6 September 2021) was a Mexican politician, diplomat, and writer. After a long-time militancy in the Institutional Revolutionary Party (PRI), he joined the Party of the Democratic Revolution (PRD) in 1995.

González Pedrero was born in Villahermosa, Tabasco. He studied law at the National Autonomous University of Mexico (UNAM) and conducted post-graduate work in Paris.

He was elected to the Senate in 1970 and served as general secretary of the PRI in 1972–74. Between 1977 and 1982 he was responsible for the Secretariat of Public Education's nationwide free school textbook programme.

In 1982 he was elected governor of his home state of Tabasco, taking office on 1 January 1983; he left the governorship in 1987 when President Carlos Salinas de Gortari called on him to head the PRI's Political, Economic and Social Studies Institute (IEEPS). In 1989 he was named director of the prestigious Fondo de Cultura Económica publishing house, leaving that position later that year to former president Miguel de la Madrid Hurtado and assuming the role of ambassador to Spain.

Since joining the PRD in 1995 he served as a federal deputy for that party. He was also a close advisor to the 2006 presidential campaign of fellow Tabascan Andrés Manuel López Obrador.

== Publications ==
- Filosofía política y humanismo (1957)
- La revolución cubana (1959)
- El gran viraje (1961)
- Riqueza de la pobreza (1970)
- La cuerda floja
- Las voces de la naturaleza, in collaboration with his wife, Julieta Campos (1982)
- Una democracia de carne y hueso
- País de un solo hombre: el México de Santa Anna
