= Lauro Ortega Martínez =

Mexican politician

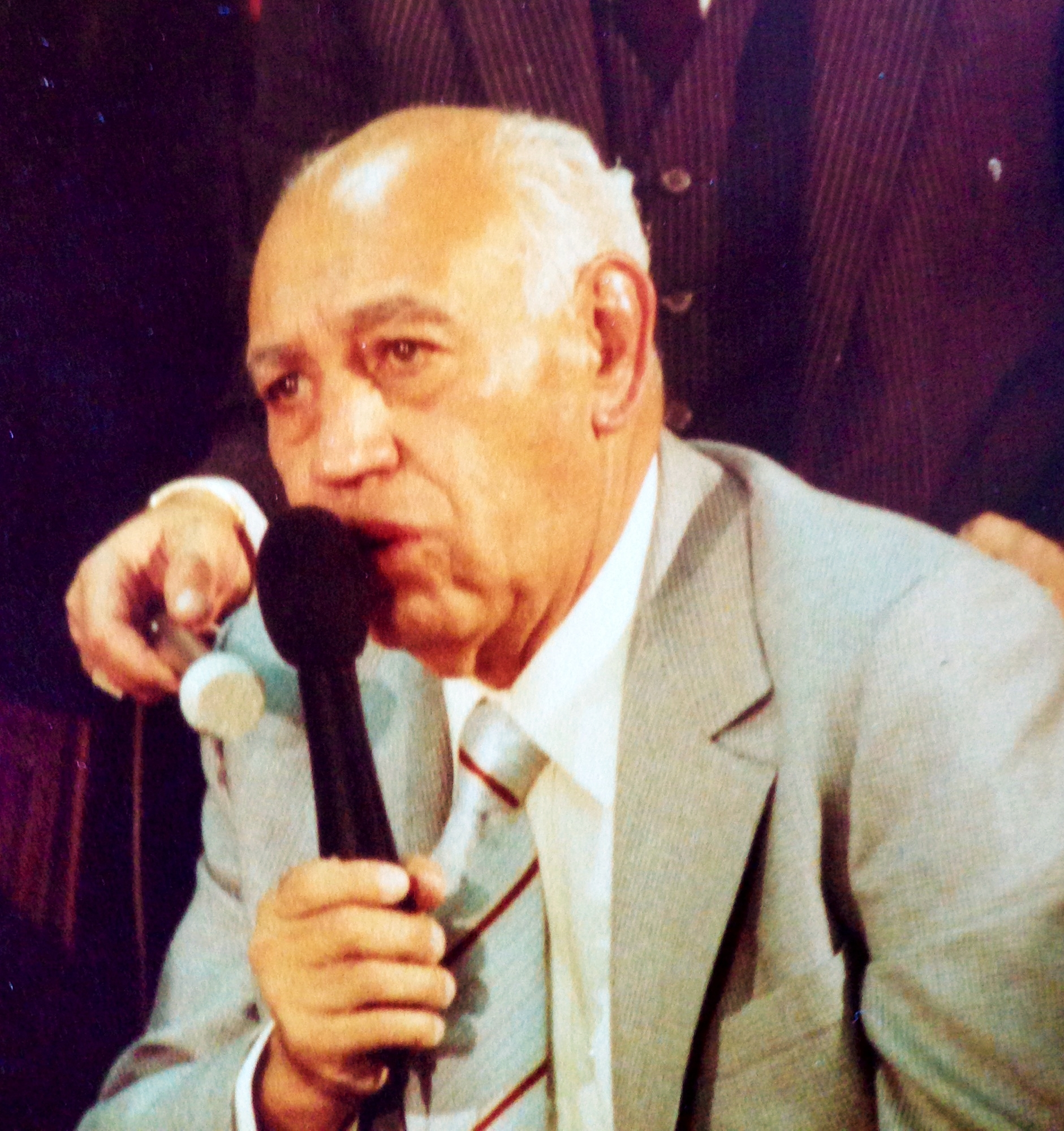

Governor of Morelos
- In office 18 May 1982 – 18 May 1988
- Preceded by: Armando León Bejarano
- Succeeded by: Antonio Riva Palacio

20th President of the Institutional Revolutionary Party
- In office 22 November 1965 – 27 February 1968
- Preceded by: Carlos A. Madrazo
- Succeeded by: Alfonso Martínez Domínguez

Personal details
- Born: June 8, 1910 Mexico City, Mexico
- Died: July 22, 1999 (aged 89) Xochitepec, Morelos
- Party: PRI
- Profession: Politician; Veterinarian

Lauro Ortega Martínez (June 8, 1910 – July 22, 1999) was a Mexican politician and veterinarian.

Ortega served as the national president of the Institutional Revolutionary Party (PRI), Mexico's longtime ruling party, during the 1960s.

In the 1979 mid-term election he was elected to the Chamber of Deputies for the fourth district of Morelos. He then served as the Governor of Morelos from 1982 to 1988, succeeding Armando León Bejarano.

Ortega Martínez died from a heart attack on July 22, 1999, aged 89.

== See also ==
- List of people from Morelos
