= Guillermo Soberón Acevedo =

Mexican politician (1925–2020)

- Born: 29 December 1925; Iguala
- Died: 12 October 2020 (aged 94); Mexico City
- Occupations: Politician, chemist, physician and educator

Guillermo Soberón Acevedo (29 December 1925 – 12 October 2020) was a Mexican politician, chemist, physician and educator.

Soberón Acevedo was born in Iguala, Guerrero, in 1925. From 1973 to 1981, he was rector of the National Autonomous University of Mexico (UNAM). From 1982 to 1988, during the presidency of Miguel de la Madrid, he served in the federal cabinet as Secretary of Health.

He was awarded the National Prize for Arts and Sciences in 1980 and was admitted to El Colegio Nacional in 1981.

Soberón Acevedo died on 12 October 2020 in Mexico City at the age of 94.
