= Alfonso Martínez Domínguez =

Mexican politician (1922–2002)

Governor of Nuevo León
- In office 1 August 1979 – 31 July 1985
- Preceded by: Pedro Zorrilla Martínez
- Succeeded by: Jorge Treviño Martínez

Head of the Federal District Department
- In office 1 December 1970 – 15 June 1971
- Preceded by: Alfonso Corona del Rosal
- Succeeded by: Octavio Sentíes Gómez

President of the Chamber of Deputies
- In office 1 December 1964 – 31 August 1965
- Preceded by: Manuel Zárate Aquino
- Succeeded by: Augusto Gómez Villanueva

Deputy of the Congress of the Union for the 4th district of Nuevo León
- In office 1 September 1964 – 31 August 1967
- Preceded by: Armando Arteaga Santoyo
- Succeeded by: Graciano Bortoni Urteaga

Deputy of the Congress of the Union for the 17th district of the Federal District
- In office 1 September 1952 – 31 August 1955
- Succeeded by: Alfonso Ituarte Servin

Deputy of the Congress of the Union for the 4th district of the Federal District
- In office 1 September 1946 – 31 August 1949
- Preceded by: Ruffo Figueroa Figueroa
- Succeeded by: Francisco Fonseca García

Personal details
- Born: January 7, 1922 Monterrey, Nuevo León, Mexico
- Died: November 6, 2002 (aged 80)
- Party: PRI
- Occupation: Politician

Alfonso Martínez Domínguez (January 7, 1922 – November 6, 2002) was the governor of the Mexican state of Nuevo León from 1979 to 1985.

== Personal life ==
Son of physician Alfonso Martinez de la Garza and Margarita Rafaela Dominguez Samaniego; grandson of Alfonso Martinez de la Garza and Maria de la Garza. He did his elementary studies in Monterrey, his secondary studies in Mexico City, and he received a bachelor's degree from Franco-Mexican College in Mexico City.

== Career ==
He began governmental career as a clerk (5th category) in the Department of the Federal District in 1937; chief editor. He was federal deputy from Federal District 4 from 1946 to 1949. He was a member of the Committee for the Department of the Federal District, 2nd Balloting Committee, Public Works Committee, and the Securities Committee. He was a federal deputy from Federal District 17 from 1952 to 1955 and a member of the Legislative Studies Committee and Tourism Committee. He was a federal deputy from the State of Nuevo León from 1964 to 1967.

He represented District 4, serving as president of the Chamber of Deputies in December 1964. He was President of Gran Commission, member of 1st Committee on Government, Constitutional Affairs Committee; Senator from the state of Nuevo León, 1988–1991; Secretary of organization regional PRI Committee of the Federal District, 1955; secretary of popular action, CEN of PRI, 1946; president of CEN of PRI, 1968–1970; Secretary-General of CNOP of PRI, 1962–1965; Department of Republican Relations, Department of the Federal District, 1970–1971; director general of Airport and Auxiliary services, Secretariat of Communications and Transportation, 1987–1988; Secretary-general Union of Workers of the Department of the Federal District 1942–1943; and author of two books on history.

He resigned as head of the Federal District after the 1971 Corpus Christi massacre; most observers see the resignation as a result of power struggles within the ruling circle rather than just the result of the riots.

Martínez Domínguez represented a traditional type of Mexican politician that has almost become extinct. He came from a very poor background and had virtually no education. He received three honorary degrees. He worked his way up through the party hierarchy. He became the president of the PRI in the 1960s. Known and remembered for his tenacity, focus, passion for his country, Martínez Domínguez had the reputation of a ruthless politician.

- Mayor of Mexico City in 1971,
- Governor of Nuevo León from 1979
- Senator from 1988, 1997

He served as secretary general of the federal bureaucrats union (FSTSE, 1949 – 1952) and got elected to the Chamber of Deputies on three occasions. He was senator twice and Governor of Nuevo León.

Party political offices
Preceded by Lauro Ortega Martínez	President of the Institutional Revolutionary Party; 1968–1970	Succeeded by Manuel Sánchez Vite
Chamber of Deputies (Mexico)
Preceded by Armando Arteaga Santoyo	4th district of Nuevo León; 1964 – 1967	Succeeded by Graciano Bortoni Urteaga
Preceded by	17th district of the Federal District; 1952 – 1955	Succeeded by Alfonso Ituarte Servin
Preceded by Ruffo Figueroa Figueroa	4th district of the Federal District; 1946 – 1949	Succeeded by Francisco Fonseca García
