= José de las Fuentes Rodríguez =

Mexican politician

Governor of Coahuila
- In office 1 December 1981 – 30 November 1987
- Preceded by: Francisco José Madero
- Succeeded by: Eliseo Mendoza Berrueto

President of the Chamber of Deputies
- In office 1 September 1968 – 30 September 1968
- Preceded by: Alfonso Martín de Alba
- Succeeded by: Humberto Acevedo Astudillo

Member of the Chamber of Deputies for Coahuila's 1st district
- In office 1 September 1976 – 31 August 1979
- Preceded by: Jesús Roberto Dávila Narro
- Succeeded by: Jorge Masso Masso
- In office 1 September 1967 – 31 August 1970
- Preceded by: Tomás Algaba Gómez
- Succeeded by: Gustavo Guerra Castaños

Personal details
- Born: 20 April 1920 General Cepeda, Coahuila
- Died: 8 October 2011 (aged 91) Mexico City
- Party: Institutional Revolutionary Party (PRI)
- Spouse: Elsa Hernández Salazar
- Children: Fernando de las Fuentes
- Profession: Lawyer

José de las Fuentes Rodríguez (April 20, 1920 – October 8, 2011) was a Mexican politician and lawyer. He served as the Governor of Coahuila from December 1, 1981, to November 1, 1987.

De Las Fuentes received his law degree from the National Autonomous University of Mexico in 1944. He later earned a doctorate in criminal law.

De las Fuentes began his career in public service at the National Company for Basic Commodities (Conasupo). He served as the Attorney General of Coahuila from 1957 to 1963. He was elected to the Chamber of Deputies for two terms, representing Coahuila's first district. He was the President of the Chamber of Deputies in 1968. He also taught as a professor at the National Autonomous University of Mexico.

José de las Fuentes Rodríguez served as the governor of Coahuila from 1981 to 1987. He made access to new housing programs a priority of his administration. Several new facilities were also constructed in Coahuila during his tenure, including a new state government center and the major Coahuila convention center.

José de las Fuentes Rodríguez died in Mexico City, where he lived during his later years, on October 8, 2011, at the age of 91. He was survived by his children - Guadalupe, José, Arturo, and Fernando de las Fuentes Hernández. His wife, Elsa Hernández Salazar, died in 1984. The couple had met in Mexico City and Veracruz. His funeral was held in Saltillo, the capital of Coahuila.
