= Óscar Ornelas =

Mexican politician

Óscar Ornelas Küchle

Governor of Chihuahua
- In office 4 October 1980 – 19 September 1985
- Preceded by: Manuel Bernardo Aguirre
- Succeeded by: Saúl González Herrera

Senator for Chihuahua
- In office 1 September 1976 – 1979
- Preceded by: Arnaldo Gutiérrez Hernández
- Succeeded by: Santiago Nieto Sandoval

Municipal President of Chihuahua
- In office 10 October 1974 – 1976
- Preceded by: José Luis Caballero
- Succeeded by: Humberto Martínez Delgado

Personal details
- Born: 30 November 1919 Chihuahua, Chih., Mexico
- Died: 2000
- Party: Institutional Revolutionary

Óscar Ornelas Küchle (30 November 1919 in Chihuahua, Chih. – 2000) was a Mexican lawyer and politician and member of Institutional Revolutionary Party (PRI). He served as governor of Chihuahua from 1980 to 1985.

Óscar Ornelas was also a Magistrate (associate justice) of the Supreme Tribunal of Justice of the State of Chihuahua, Director of the Faculty of Law and Rector of the Autonomous University of Chihuahua (UACh). He also founded "El Colegio de Bachilleres" at national level, the first campus its name: Oscar Ornelas, in his honor. In 1974, he was elected mayor of the city of Chihuahua. In 1980, he was elected to be the Governor of Chihuahua. In 1985, a conflict in the election for the Rector of the Autonomous University of Chihuahua degenerated in a political confrontation that occurred in which led to his downfall as governor. The following year, one of his main opponents was Fidel Velázquez Sánchez. Óscar Ornelas lost the support of his party and was forced to resign the governorship on 19 September 1985.

Recently the Library of the School of Law of the Autonomous University of Chihuahua was rebaptized with the name of "Óscar Ornelas Küchle"; he is, in fact, the only lawyer to have a commemorative plaque and statue on the university facilities.

Preceded by José Luis Caballero	Mayor of Chihuahua; 1974–1976	Succeeded by Humberto Martínez Delgado

Preceded by Manuel Bernardo Aguirre	Governor of Chihuahua; 1980–1985	Succeeded by Saúl González Herrera
