= Rodolfo Landeros Gallegos =

Mexican politician

Governor of Aguascalientes
- In office 1 December 1980 – 30 November 1986
- Preceded by: José Refugio Esparza Reyes
- Succeeded by: Miguel Ángel Barberena Vega

Senator for Aguascalientes
- In office 1 September 1976 – 1980
- Preceded by: Enrique Olivares Santana
- Succeeded by: Roberto Díaz Rodríguez

Personal details
- Born: 1931 (age 94–95)
- Party: Institutional Revolutionary

Rodolfo Landeros Gallegos (born 1931, died 11 October 2001) was a former Mexican politician and member of the Institutional Revolutionary Party. He served as governor of Aguascalientes from 1980 to 1986 and senator from 1976 to 1980.

Rodolfo Landeros, popularly known as El Güero, studied public relations and media through which his political career was developed. He was in charge of press and social communication offices of the Presidency of the Republic and the National Executive Committee of the PRI during the government of José López Portillo.

Elected as governor of Aguascalientes in 1980, he accomplished important public works in the state and the capital. Landeros' term marked the beginning of a period of rapid economic development in the state. Despite being a member of the center-left PRI, Landeros was responsible for the first decentralized water management commission in Aguascalientes, a move toward privatization which allowed an independent commission to provide the service rather than the government directly providing water service.
