= Governor of Oaxaca =

Governor of Mexican state

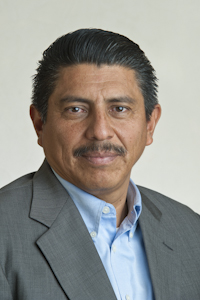
- Incumbent; Salomón Jara Cruz since 1 December 2022
- Term length: Six years, non-renewable.

The governor of Oaxaca (officially in Spanish Gobernador Constitucional del Estado Libre y Soberano de Oaxaca, in English Constitutional Governor of the Free and Sovereign State of Oaxaca), heads the executive branch of the Mexican state of Oaxaca. The office is created by the state constitution, which specifies a term of 6 years and prohibits reelection. The governor takes office on December 1, and the term ends on November 30 six years later.

Gabino Cué Monteagudo was the first non-Institutional Revolutionary Party governor elected since 1929.

== Governors of the state of Oaxaca ==
- (1847-1852): Benito Pablo Juárez García
- (1917–1919): Juan Jiménez Méndez
- (1920–1924): Manuel García Vigil

- (1923): Flavio Pérez Gasga

- (1924–1925): Onofre Jiménez
- (1925–1927): Genaro V. Vásquez
- (1927-1928): Jacinto Orduña
- (1928–1932): Francisco López Cortés
- (1932–1936): Anastasio García Toledo, National Revolutionary Party, PNR
- (1936–1940): Constantino Chapital, PNR
- (1940–1944): Vicente González Fernández, Party of the Mexican Revolution, PRM
- (1944–1947): Edmundo M. Sánchez Cano, PRM
- (1947–1950): Eduardo Vasconcelos PRI
- (1950–1952): Manuel Mayoral Heredia PRI
- (1952–1955): Manuel Cabrera Carrasqueado PRI

- (1955): Manuel I. Manjardín (Interim) PRI
- (1955–1956): José Pacheco Iturribarría (Interim) PRI

- (1956–1962): Alfonso Pérez Gasca PRI
- (1962–1968): Rodolfo Brena Torres PRI
- (1968–1970): Víctor Bravo Ahuja PRI
- (1970–1974): Fernando Gómez Sandoval PRI
- (1974–1977): Miguel Zárate Aquino PRI
- (1977–1980): Eliseo Jiménez Ruiz PRI
- (1980–1985): Pedro Vázquez Colmenares PRI
- (1985–1986): Jesús Martínez Álvarez PRI
- (1986–1992): Heladio Ramírez López PRI
- (1992–1998): Diódoro Carrasco Altamirano PRI
- (1998–2004): José Murat Casab PRI
- (2004–2010): Ulises Ruiz Ortiz PRI
- (2010–2016): Gabino Cué Monteagudo, Citizens' Movement
- (2016–2022): Alejandro Murat Hinojosa PRI
- (2022–Present): Salomón Jara Cruz Morena

== See also ==
- List of Mexican state governors
