= José Guadalupe Cervantes Corona =

Mexican politician

José Guadalupe Cervantes

Governor of Zacatecas
- In office 12 September 1980 – 11 September 1986
- Preceded by: Fernando Pámanes Escobedo
- Succeeded by: Genaro Borrego Estrada

President of the Chamber of Deputies
- In office 1 November 1963 – 30 November 1963
- Preceded by: Salvador González Lobo
- Succeeded by: Joaquín Gamboa Pascoe

Member of the Chamber of Deputies for Zacatecas′s 3rd district
- In office 1 September 1961 – 31 August 1964
- Preceded by: Hugo Romero Macías
- Succeeded by: José Muro Saldívar

Personal details
- Born: 24 May 1924 Teúl de González Ortega, Zacatecas
- Died: 13 March 2013 (aged 88)
- Party: PRI (until 2004)

José Guadalupe Cervantes Corona (May 24, 1924 – March 13, 2013) was a Mexican politician and academic. He served as the Governor of Zacatecas from 1980 to 1986.

== Background ==
Cervantes was born in the municipality of Teúl de González Ortega, Zacatecas, in 1924.

Cervantes became Zacatecan state Director of Education in 1950 when he was only 26 years old. He next served as an official within the administration of Zacatecan Governor Francisco E. García from 1956 to 1962. Cervantes would later be elected to the state Chamber of Deputies and then as a federal deputy in the Chamber of Deputies. Cervantes then held a seat in the Senate of the Republic from 1976 until 1980.

== Governor ==
A member of the ruling Institutional Revolutionary Party (PRI), was elected Governor of the Mexican state of Zacatecas in 1980 with the support of Mexican President José López Portillo. He served as Governor for one term, ending in 1986. Cervantes was a strong proponent of infrastructure and urban development projects during his tenure. He supported and launched a new gas pipeline connecting neighboring Aguascalientes to Zacateca's second largest city, Fresnillo. He sought to attract new investors and businesses to the cities of Guadalupe and Calera de Víctor Rosales. He was the first Zacatecan Governor to propose a new industrial corridor extending from Ojocaliente to Fresnillo. Cervantes hoped that the new projects would boost jobs and economic growth in the state.

== Later life ==
He largely stayed out of local politics until the early 2000s. In 2004, Cervantes publicly renounced his membership in the Institutional Revolutionary Party (PRI) and left the party. He endorsed gubernatorial candidate Amalia García of the Party of the Democratic Revolution (PRD) in the 2004 Zacatecan election. Garcia's father had served in Cervantes cabinet during his tenure as governor. Amalia Garcia won the 2004 election over the PRI candidate and was elected governor.

Cervantes again criticized the PRI in 2010 over a potential political alliance between the PRI and the Labor Party, which he opposed. However, the proposed alliance never came to fruition.

== Passing ==
Cervantes died at home from heart failure on March 13, 2013, at the age of 88. A public viewing was held at the Sixtina de Funerales Hernández chapel in the city of Zacatecas, Zacatecas.
