= Guillermo Jiménez Morales =

Mexican politician, born 1933

Ambassador of Mexico to the Holy See
- In office 1995–1998
- President: Ernesto Zedillo
- Preceded by: Enrique Olivares Santana
- Succeeded by: Horacio Sánchez Unzueta

Secretary of Fisheries
- In office 1991–1994
- President: Carlos Salinas
- Preceded by: María de los Ángeles Moreno
- Succeeded by: Julia Carabias Lillo

Member of Congress
- In office 1988–1991
- Constituency: Federal District's 24th

Governor of Puebla
- In office 1 February 1981 – 31 January 1987
- Preceded by: Alfredo Toxqui
- Succeeded by: Mariano Piña Olaya

Member of Congress
- In office 1979–1982
- Constituency: Puebla's 11th

Member of Congress
- In office 1973–1976
- Constituency: Puebla's 10th

Personal details
- Born: 2 December 1933 (age 92) Huauchinango, Puebla, Mexico
- Party: PRI
- Education: UNAM
- Occupation: Politician
- Profession: Lawyer

Guillermo Jiménez Morales (Note: In this Spanish name, the first or paternal surname is Jiménez and the second or maternal family name is Morales.) (born 2 December 1933) is a Mexican lawyer and politician affiliated with the Institutional Revolutionary Party (PRI). He served as governor of Puebla from 1981 to 1987 and was his country's ambassador to the Holy See between 1995 and 1998.

== Political career ==
Guillermo Jiménez Morales was born in Huauchinango in the Sierra Norte of Puebla on 2 December 1933. His parents were Alberto Jiménez Valderrábano – elected to the Chamber of Deputies in 1952 and sometime mayor of Huauchinango – and Estela Morales Cruz. After attending schools in Huauchinango and Mexico City, he studied at the National Autonomous University of Mexico (UNAM) from 1951 to 1955 and was awarded a law degree in 1957 with a thesis on Mexican electoral law.

In the 1973 mid-terms, Jiménez was elected to the Chamber of Deputies for Puebla's 10th congressional district. He returned to Congress for Puebla's 11th district in the 1979 mid-terms.

In 1980 he was selected as the PRI's candidate for the governorship of Puebla in the state elections held on 30 November. He won the election with over 83% of the votes cast and was sworn in as governor for a six-year term on 1 February 1981. His term in office was noted for the emphasis he placed on education, and among his accomplishments was the institution of the Colegio de Bachilleres system in the state.

Following his term as governor, he was elected to Congress for the Federal District's 24th district (Xochimilco/Tlalpan) in the 1988 general election. During that congressional term, he served for one month as president of the Chamber of Deputies.

In 1991, President Carlos Salinas de Gortari appointed Jiménez Morales to his cabinet as secretary of fisheries, where he served until the end of Salinas's presidency in November 1994. From 6 April 1995 to 16 January 1998, under President Ernesto Zedillo, he was Mexico's ambassador to the Holy See, the third since the two states re-established diplomatic relations in 1992.

Over a period of five decades, Jiménez Morales also held numerous internal positions within the PRI's political machinery.

== Personal life ==
Jiménez Morales was married to Laura Elena Betancourt (died 2017), with whom he had four children. His brother Alberto (1929–2024) was also active in Puebla state politics and was described as the "de facto governor" during the gubernatorial term of Jiménez Morales's "weak and unpopular" successor, Mariano Piña Olaya. At least one of Guillermo Jiménez Morales's grandchildren has followed him into politics.
