= Manuel Bartlett =

Mexican politician

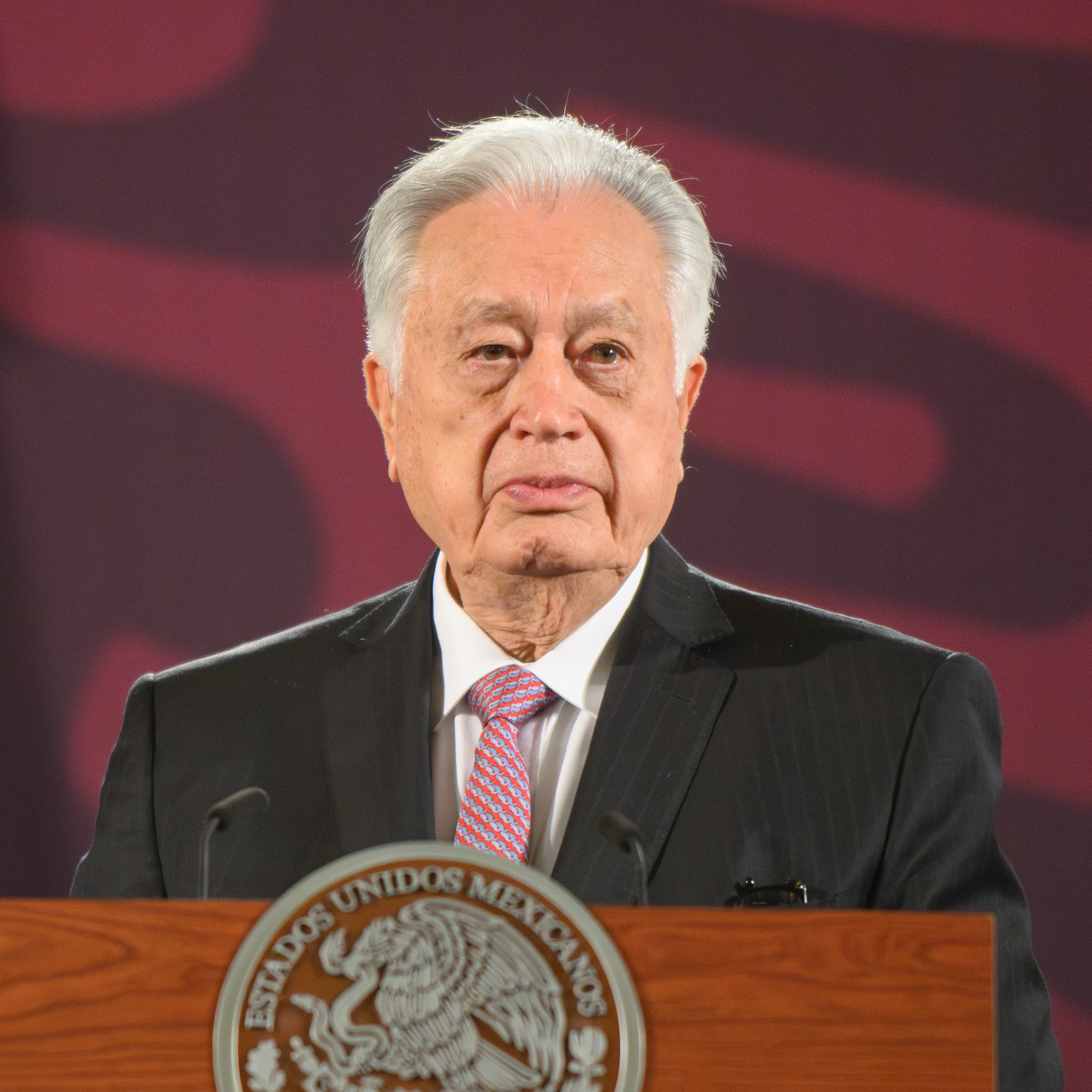
- Bartlett in 2024

Director of the Federal Electricity Commission
- In office 1 December 2018 – 30 September 2024
- President: Andrés Manuel López Obrador
- Preceded by: Jaime Hernández Martínez
- Succeeded by: Emilia Esther Calleja Alor

Governor of Puebla
- In office 1 February 1993 – 31 January 1999
- Preceded by: Mariano Piña Olaya
- Succeeded by: Melquíades Morales

Secretary of the Interior of Mexico
- In office 1 December 1982 – 30 November 1988
- President: Miguel de la Madrid Hurtado
- Preceded by: Enrique Olivares Santana
- Succeeded by: Fernando Gutiérrez Barrios

Personal details
- Born: 23 February 1936 (age 90) Puebla de Zaragoza, Puebla
- Party: Labor Party (since 2012)
- Other political affiliations: Institutional Revolutionary Party (1957–2012)
- Parent(s): Manuel Bartlett Bautista; Isabel Díaz Castilla
- Profession: Lawyer, politician

Manuel Bartlett Díaz (Note: In this Mexican name, the surname is Bartlett and the second or maternal family name is Díaz.) (born 23 February 1936) is a Mexican politician affiliated with the Labor Party (PT) since 2012. As a member of the Institutional Revolutionary Party (PRI), he served as Secretary of the Interior (1982–1988), and as Governor of Puebla (1993–1999). He served as director of the Federal Electricity Commission between 2018 and 2024.

== Life and political career ==
Manuel Bartlett Díaz was born in the city of Puebla in 1936. He joined the Institutional Revolutionary Party (PRI) in 1964 and served as the Secretary of the Interior under President Miguel de la Madrid in 1982–1988, therefore becoming the head of the Federal Electoral Commission (Comisión Federal Electoral, CFE) during the period. During the 1988 presidential election, there were reports of electoral fraud following the alleged crash of the vote-counting system when Cuauhtémoc Cárdenas, the opposition candidate from the National Democratic Front, was leading against the PRI's candidate, Carlos Salinas de Gortari. Bartlett denied that he had rigged the election and claimed that this was an attempt to make him the "scapegoat of a smear campaign". Although de la Madrid admitted that the election had been rigged in his 2004 autobiography, Bartlett has denied that this was the case and has said that it was actually a conspiracy between Salinas and the National Action Party (PAN).

Under Salinas, he served as Secretary of Public Education in 1988–1992, and later as governor of Puebla in 1993–1999. In the 2000 general election, Bartlett was elected to the Senate of the Republic for the 2000–2006 term, where he became known as one of the most staunch defenders of state ownership of electric utilities.

On 27 May 2006, in view of the low possibility of Institutional Revolutionary Party (PRI) candidate Roberto Madrazo winning the presidency, Bartlett declared that he would vote for Andrés Manuel López Obrador, the candidate of the Party of the Democratic Revolution (PRD), to avoid a right-wing victory. Madrazo and the national leader of the PRI, Mariano Palacios, both condemned these declarations, and announced the possible expulsion of Bartlett from the party. Bartlett responded by continuing to speak out against both leaders. After the 2006 general election, Bartlett aligned himself with López Obrador and his Coalition for the Good of All.

In 2012 he reentered national politics and was elected a senator for the left-wing Labor Party (PT), in coalition with López Obrador's PRD. After López Obrador's election as president in 2018, he appointed Bartlett to become the director-general of the Federal Electricity Commission (Comisión Federal de Electricidad, CFE), the state-owned electricity utility and the country's second most powerful state-owned company after Petróleos Mexicanos (PEMEX). He left the CFE at the end of López Obrador's presidency in September 2024.

Bartlett has been described as a corrupt politician.

== Camarena case ==
In a three-part article series, investigative journalist Charles Bowden offers eyewitness accounts of Bartlett's involvement (along with other senior Mexican political, law enforcement, security and military officials) in the decision to order the kidnap, torture and murder of American DEA officer Enrique S. "Kiki" Camarena in 1985 in order to shut down his successful campaign against the Guadalajara Cartel. In these accounts, cartel figures repeatedly state they expect Bartlett Díaz to one day become president, with the implication that they will prosper as a result. Earlier accounts claimed that DEA suspicions about Bartlett Díaz's involvement in the murder led to the ruling PRI's refusal to consider him as a presidential candidate, leading to the selection of Carlos Salinas de Gortari in Bartlett's stead.

== See also ==
- 1988 Mexican general election

== Notes ==
Preceded by Enrique Olivares Santana	Secretary of the Interior; 1982–1988	Succeeded by Fernando Gutiérrez Barrios
Preceded by Mariano Piña Olaya	Governor of Puebla; 1993–1999	Succeeded by Melquiades Morales
