= 1991 in Mexico =

- Decades: 1970s; 1980s; 1990s; 2000s; 2010s
- See also: History of Mexico; List of years in Mexico; Timeline of Mexican history

Events in the year 1991 in Mexico.

== Incumbents ==
=== Federal government ===
- President: Carlos Salinas de Gortari
- Interior Secretary (SEGOB): Fernando Gutiérrez Barrios
- Secretary of Foreign Affairs (SRE): Fernando Solana Morales
- Communications Secretary (SCT): Andrés Caso Lombardo
- Secretary of Defense (SEDENA): Antonio Riviello Bazán
- Secretary of Navy: Luis Carlos Ruano Angulo
- Secretary of Labor and Social Welfare: Arsenio Farell Cubillas
- Secretary of Welfare: Patricio Chirinos Calero/Luis Donaldo Colosio
- Secretary of Public Education: Manuel Bartlett Díaz
- Tourism Secretary (SECTUR): Silvia Hernández Enríquez
- Secretary of Fisheries (SEPESCA): María de los Angeles Moreno/Guillermo Jiménez Morales
- Secretary of Health (SALUD): Jesús Kumate Rodríguez

=== Supreme Court ===
- President of the Supreme Court: Ulises Schmill Ordóñez

=== Governors ===
- Aguascalientes: Miguel Ángel Barberena Vega, (Institutional Revolutionary Party, PRI)
- Baja California: Ernesto Ruffo Appel, (National Action Party PAN)
- Baja California Sur: Abelardo Carrillo Zavala
- Campeche: Abelardo Carrillo Zavala/Abelardo Carrillo Zavala
- Chiapas: Patrocinio González Garrido
- Chihuahua: Fernando Baeza Meléndez
- Coahuila: Eliseo Mendoza Berrueto
- Colima: Elías Zamora Verduzco/Carlos de la Madrid Virgen
- Durango: José Ramírez Gamero
- Guanajuato: Rafael Corrales Ayala/Carlos Medina Plascencia
- Guerrero: Alejandro Cervantes Delgado
- Hidalgo: José Francisco Ruiz Massieu
- Jalisco: Adolfo Lugo Verduzco
- State of Mexico: Guillermo Cosío Vidaurri
- Michoacán: Genovevo Figueroa Zamudio
- Morelos: Antonio Riva Palacio (PRI).
- Nayarit: Celso Humberto Delgado Ramírez
- Nuevo León: Sócrates Rizzo
- Oaxaca: Heladio Ramírez López
- Puebla: Mariano Piña Olaya
- Querétaro: Mariano Palacios Alcocer
- Quintana Roo: Miguel Borge Martín
- San Luis Potosí: Fausto Zapata
- Sinaloa: Francisco Labastida
- Sonora: Mario Morúa Johnson/Manlio Fabio Beltrones Rivera
- Tabasco: Manuel Gurría Ordóñez
- Tamaulipas: Américo Villarreal Guerra
- Tlaxcala: Beatriz Paredes Rangel
- Veracruz: Dante Delgado Rannauro
- Yucatán: Dulce María Sauri Riancho
- Zacatecas: Genaro Borrego Estrada/Pedro de León
- Regent of Mexico City: Manuel Camacho Solís

== Events ==
- The Amparo Museum is inaugurated.
- The FIL Award is awarded for the first time, the recipient is Chilean author Nicanor Parra.
- The Monterrey Metro begins operating.
- The Museo de Arte Contemporáneo de Monterrey is established.
- August 18: 1991 Mexican legislative election.
- September 16–19: Tropical Storm Ignacio (1991).
- Unknown date: Xcaret Park opens.

== Awards ==
- Belisario Domínguez Medal of Honor – Gonzalo Aguirre Beltrán

== Sport ==
- 1990–91 Mexican Primera División season
- 1990–91 Copa México
- Sultanes de Monterrey win the Mexican League.
- 1991 Central American and Caribbean Championships in Athletics take place in Xalapa, Veracruz.
- 1991 Mexican Grand Prix
- 430 km of Mexico City
- Mexico at the 1991 Pan American Games
- The Naranjeros de Álamo are founded.

== Births ==
- May 5 – Raúl Jiménez, footballer
- June 3 – Natasha Dupeyrón, actress and singer
- August 2 – Zuleyka Silver, fashion model and actress
- October 22 – Tatiana Martínez, actress
- December 15 – Jorge Blanco, musician, singer, dancer, and actor

== Deaths ==
- February 5 — Sergio Méndez Arceo, 7th Mexican bishop of Cuernavaca 1953–1982, and advocate of Liberation theology (b. 1907).
- June 24 — Rufino Tamayo, painter (b. 1899)
- October 10 — Nazario S. Ortiz Garza, Governor of Coahuila 1929-1933
