= 1992 in Mexico =

- Decades: 1970s; 1980s; 1990s; 2000s; 2010s
- See also: History of Mexico; List of years in Mexico; Timeline of Mexican history

Events in the year 1992 in Mexico.

== Incumbents ==
=== Federal government ===
- President: Carlos Salinas de Gortari
- Interior Secretary (SEGOB): Fernando Gutiérrez Barrios
- Secretary of Foreign Affairs (SRE): Fernando Solana Morales
- Communications Secretary (SCT): Andrés Caso Lombardo/Emilio Gamboa Patrón
- Secretary of Defense (SEDENA): Antonio Riviello Bazán
- Secretary of Navy: Luis Carlos Ruano Angulo
- Secretary of Labor and Social Welfare (STPS): Arsenio Farell Cubillas
- Secretary of Welfare: Patricio Chirinos Calero/Luis Donaldo Colosio
- Secretary of Public Education: Manuel Bartlett Díaz/Ernesto Zedillo Ponce de León
- Tourism Secretary (SECTUR): Silvia Hernández Enríquez
- Secretary of Fisheries (SEPESCA): Guillermo Jiménez Morales
- Secretary of Health (SALUD): Jesús Kumate Rodríguez

=== Supreme Court ===
- President of the Supreme Court: Ulises Schmill Ordóñez

=== Governors ===
- Aguascalientes
  - Miguel Ángel Barberena Vega, (Institutional Revolutionary Party, PRI), until November 30
  - Otto Granados Roldán, PRI, starting December 1.
- Baja California: Ernesto Ruffo Appel, (National Action Party PAN)
- Baja California Sur: Víctor Manuel Liceaga Ruibal
- Campeche: Abelardo Carrillo Zavala/Jorge Salomón Azar García
- Chiapas: Patrocinio González Garrido
- Chihuahua: Fernando Baeza Meléndez/Francisco Barrio
- Coahuila: Eliseo Mendoza Berrueto
- Colima: Carlos de la Madrid Virgen
- Durango: José Ramírez Gamero/Maximiliano Silerio Esparza
- Guanajuato: Carlos Medina Plascencia
- Guerrero: José Francisco Ruiz Massieu (PRI)
- Hidalgo: Adolfo Lugo Verduzco
- Jalisco: Guillermo Cosío Vidaurri/Carlos Rivera Aceves (PRI)
- State of Mexico: Ignacio Pichardo Pagaza/Emilio Chuayffet (PRI)
- Michoacán: Genovevo Figueroa Zamudio/Eduardo Villaseñor Peña/Ausencio Chávez Hernández
- Morelos: Antonio Riva Palacio (PRI).
- Nayarit: Celso Humberto Delgado Ramírez
- Nuevo León: Sócrates Rizzo (PRI)
- Oaxaca: Diódoro Carrasco Altamirano (PRI)
- Puebla: Mariano Piña Olaya/Manuel Bartlett Díaz (PRI)
- Querétaro: Enrique Burgos García (PRI)
- Quintana Roo: Miguel Borge Martín (PRI)
- San Luis Potosí: Horacio Sánchez Unzueta (PRI)
- Sinaloa: Francisco Labastida/Renato Vega Alvarado (PRI)
- Sonora: Manlio Fabio Beltrones Rivera (PRI)
- Tabasco: Salvador Neme Castillo/Manuel Gurría Ordóñez (PRI)
- Tamaulipas: Américo Villarreal Guerra/Manuel Cavazos Lerma (PRI)
- Tlaxcala: Samuel Quiróz de la Vega/José Antonio Álvarez Lima (PRD)
- Veracruz: Dante Delgado Rannauro/Patricio Chirinos Calero (PRI)
- Yucatán: Dulce María Sauri Riancho (PRI)
- Zacatecas: Pedro de Leon/Arturo Romo Gutiérrez (PRI)
- Regent of Mexico City: Manuel Camacho Solís

== Events ==
- January 16: Signing of the Chapultepec Peace Accords in Mexico City.
- April 22: 1992 Guadalajara explosions.
- July 8: The José Luis Cuevas Museum opens.

== Awards ==
- Belisario Domínguez Medal of Honor – Ramón G. Bonfil

== Sport ==
- 1991–92 Mexican Primera División season.
- 1991–92 Copa México.
- 1992 Caribbean Series played at the Héctor Espino Baseball Stadium in Hermosillo.
- Tigres del México win the Mexican League.
- 1992 Mexican Grand Prix.
- Mexico at the 1992 Winter Olympics.
- Mexico at the 1992 Summer Olympics.
- Mexico at the 1992 Summer Paralympics.
- Monterrey La Raza is founded.
- August 5: Tigrillos de Chetumal are founded.

== Births ==
- February 2: David Sánchez (boxer) (d. 2017).
- March 13: Frida Sofía, singer/songwriter
- May 23: Ramiro Alejandro Celis, bullfighter (d. 2017).
- June 24: Germán Sánchez, diver.
- July 8: Ariel Camacho, singer-songwriter (Los Plebes del Rancho de Ariel Camacho), (d. February 25, 2015).

== Deaths ==
- January 19: Augusto Benedico, Spanish-Mexican actor (Los ricos también lloran)
- February 5: Sergio Méndez Arceo, Roman Catholic bishop of Cuernavaca 1953-1983 (b. 1907)
