= 1993 in Mexico =

- Decades: 1970s; 1980s; 1990s; 2000s; 2010s
- See also: History of Mexico; List of years in Mexico; Timeline of Mexican history

Events in the year 1993 in Mexico.

== Incumbents ==
=== Federal government ===
- President: Carlos Salinas de Gortari
- Interior Secretary (SEGOB): Fernando Gutiérrez Barrios/Patrocinio González Garrido
- Secretary of Foreign Affairs (SRE): Fernando Solana Morales/Manuel Camacho Solís
- Communications Secretary (SCT): Emilio Gamboa Patrón
- Secretary of Defense (SEDENA): Antonio Riviello Bazán
- Secretary of Navy: Luis Carlos Ruano Angulo
- Secretary of Labor and Social Welfare (STPS): Arsenio Farell Cubillas
- Secretary of Welfare: Luis Donaldo Colosio/Carlos Rojas Gutiérrez
- Secretary of Public Education: Ernesto Zedillo Ponce de León/Fernando Solana Morales
- Tourism Secretary (SECTUR): Silvia Hernández Enríquez
- Secretary of Fisheries (SEPESCA): Guillermo Jiménez Morales
- Secretary of Health (SALUD): Jesús Kumate Rodríguez

=== Supreme Court ===
- President of the Supreme Court: Ulises Schmill Ordóñez

=== Governors ===
- Aguascalientes: Otto Granados Roldán, (Institutional Revolutionary Party, PRI)
- Baja California: Ernesto Ruffo Appel, (National Action Party PAN)
- Baja California Sur: Víctor Manuel Liceaga Ruibal/Guillermo Mercado Romero (PRI)
- Campeche: Jorge Salomón Azar García
- Chiapas: Patrocinio González Garrido/Elmar Setzer Marseille
- Chihuahua: Francisco Barrio (PAN)
- Coahuila: Eliseo Mendoza Berrueto/Rogelio Montemayor Seguy (PRI)
- Colima: Carlos de la Madrid Virgen
- Durango: Maximiliano Silerio Esparza
- Guanajuato: Carlos Medina Plascencia
- Guerrero: José Francisco Ruiz Massieu/Rubén Figueroa Alcocer (PRI)
- Hidalgo: Adolfo Lugo Verduzco/Jesús Murillo Karam
- Jalisco: Carlos Rivera Aceves
- State of Mexico: Ignacio Pichardo Pagaza/Emilio Chuayffet (PRI)
- Michoacán: Ausencio Chávez Hernández
- Morelos
  - Antonio Riva Palacio (PRI), until May 17.
  - Jorge Carrillo Olea (PRI), starting May 18.
- Nayarit: Celso Humberto Delgado Ramírez
- Nuevo León: Sócrates Rizzo (PRI)
- Oaxaca: Diódoro Carrasco Altamirano (PRI)
- Puebla: Mariano Piña Olaya/Manuel Bartlett Díaz (PRI)
- Querétaro: Enrique Burgos García (PRI)
- Quintana Roo: Miguel Borge Martín/Mario Villanueva Madrid (PRI)
- San Luis Potosí: Horacio Sánchez Unzueta (PRI)
- Sinaloa: Renato Vega Alvarado (PRI)
- Sonora: Manlio Fabio Beltrones Rivera (PRI)
- Tabasco: Salvador Neme Castillo/Manuel Gurría Ordóñez (PRI)
- Tamaulipas: Américo Villarreal Guerra/Manuel Cavazos Lerma (PRI)
- Tlaxcala: Samuel Quiróz de la Vega/José Antonio Álvarez Lima (PRD)
- Veracruz: Patricio Chirinos Calero (PRI)
- Yucatán: Dulce María Sauri Riancho/Ricardo Ávila Heredia (PRI)
- Zacatecas: Arturo Romo Gutiérrez (PRI)
- Regent of Mexico City
  - Manuel Camacho Solís
  - Manuel Aguilera Gomez

== Events ==
- The Foro Sol opened
- Musical bands La Gusana Ciega and Hocico are founded.
- Arqueología Mexicana has its first issue published.
- May 14: The Ecologist Green Party of Mexico is founded.
- May 21: The Miss Universe 1993 contest was held at the Auditorio Nacional in Mexico City.
- May 24: Roman Catholic Cardinal Juan Jesús Posadas Ocampo and five other people are assassinated in a shootout at Miguel Hidalgo y Costilla Guadalajara International Airport.
- September 3: Sistema Nacional de Creadores de Arte founded per presidential decree.
- December 1: The Apostolic Nunciature to Mexico, Girolamo Prigione, has a secret meeting with drug lord Ramón Arellano Félix, who was implicated in the assassination of Cardinal Juan Jesús Posadas six months earlier.

== Awards ==
- Belisario Domínguez Medal of Honor – Andrés Henestrosa

== Hurricanes ==
- June 18–20: Tropical Storm Beatriz (1993)
- June 18–21: Tropical Storm Arlene (1993)
- August 17–27: Hurricane Hilary (1993)
- September 8–14: Hurricane Lidia (1993)
- September 14–26: Hurricane Gert

== Sport ==
- 1992–93 Mexican Primera División season
- Olmecas de Tabasco win the Mexican League.
- 1993 Caribbean Series played at Estadio Teodoro Mariscal in Mazatlán.
- 1993 CONCACAF Gold Cup
- 1993 IAAF World Race Walking Cup
- Alto Rendimiento Tuzo is founded.

== Births ==
- January 21 – Oliver Ortíz, footballer
- April 2 – Jaime Romero Móran, artistic gymnast, (d. January 3, 2015).
- September 18 – Mariana Avitia, archer
- October 23 – Daniela Álvarez, winner of Nuestra Belleza México 2013 beauty pageant in 2013
- December 7 – Brandon Moreno, mixed martial artist
- December 11 – Yalitza Aparicio, actress and educator

== Deaths ==
- May 24 – Juan Jesús Posadas Ocampo Cardinal of Roman Catholic Archdiocese of Guadalajara, 1987-1993 (b. November 11, 1906).
