= 1990 in Mexico =

- Decades: 1970s; 1980s; 1990s; 2000s; 2010s
- See also: History of Mexico; List of years in Mexico; Timeline of Mexican history

Events in the year 1990 in Mexico.

== Incumbents ==
=== Federal government ===
- President: Carlos Salinas de Gortari
- Interior Secretary (SEGOB): Fernando Gutiérrez Barrios
- Secretary of Foreign Affairs (SRE): Fernando Solana
- Communications Secretary (SCT): Andrés Caso Lombardo
- Education Secretary (SEP): Manuel Bartlett
- Secretary of Defense (SEDENA): Antonio Riviello Bazán
- Secretary of Navy: Luis Carlos Ruano Angulo
- Secretary of Labor and Social Welfare: Arsenio Farell Cubillas
- Secretary of Welfare: Patricio Chirinos Calero
- Secretary of Public Education: Manuel Bartlett Díaz
- Tourism Secretary (SECTUR): Carlos Hank González (until 4 January), Pedro Joaquín Coldwell (starting 5 January)
- Secretary of the Environment (SEMARNAT): María de los Angeles Moreno
- Secretary of Health (SALUD): Jesús Kumate Rodríguez

=== Supreme Court ===
- President of the Supreme Court: Carlos del Río Rodríguez

=== Governors ===
- Aguascalientes: Miguel Ángel Barberena Vega, (Institutional Revolutionary Party, PRI)
- Baja California: Ernesto Ruffo Appel, (National Action Party PAN)
- Baja California Sur: Abelardo Carrillo Zavala
- Campeche: Víctor Manuel Liceaga Ruibal/Abelardo Carrillo Zavala
- Chiapas: Patrocinio González Garrido
- Chihuahua: Fernando Baeza Meléndez
- Coahuila: Eliseo Mendoza Berrueto
- Colima: Elías Zamora Verduzco/Carlos de la Madrid Virgen
- Durango: Armando del Castillo Franco/José Ramírez Gamero
- Guanajuato: Rafael Corrales Ayala/Carlos Medina Plascencia
- Guerrero: Alejandro Cervantes Delgado
- Hidalgo: Adolfo Lugo Verduzco
- Jalisco: Guillermo Cosío Vidaurri
- State of Mexico: Guillermo Cosío Vidaurri
- Michoacán: Genovevo Figueroa Zamudio
- Morelos: Antonio Riva Palacio (PRI).
- Nayarit: Celso Humberto Delgado Ramírez
- Nuevo León: Jorge Treviño
- Oaxaca: Heladio Ramírez López
- Puebla: Mariano Piña Olaya
- Querétaro: Mariano Palacios Alcocer
- Quintana Roo: Miguel Borge Martín
- San Luis Potosí: no data
- Sinaloa: Francisco Labastida
- Sonora: Rodolfo Félix Valdés
- Tabasco: Salvador Neme Castillo
- Tamaulipas: Américo Villarreal Guerra
- Tlaxcala: Beatriz Paredes Rangel
- Veracruz: Dante Delgado Rannauro
- Yucatán: Víctor Manzanilla Schaffer
- Zacatecas: Genaro Borrego Estrada
- Regent of Mexico City: Manuel Camacho Solís

== Events ==
- Fobaproa is created to attempt to resolve liquidity problems of the banking system.
- May 20: The Federal Electoral Tribunal is created as a guarantor of the constitutionality of the electoral process.
- August 4–9: Hurricane Diana
- September 29 : Miss Mexico 1990 held in Boca del Rio, Veracruz.
- December 8: The Labor Party is founded.

== Awards ==
- Belisario Domínguez Medal of Honor – Andrés Serra Rojas

== Sport ==
- 1989–90 Mexican Primera División season
- 1989–90 Copa Mexico
- Bravos de León win the Mexican League.
- 1990 Central American and Caribbean Games held in Mexico City.
- 1990 Mexican Grand Prix
- 1990 480 km of Mexico City
- 1990 World Karate Championships held in Mexico City.
- 1990 Pan American Race Walking Cup in Xalapa, Veracruz.

== Births ==
- January 26 – Sergio Pérez, racing driver
- January 30 – Eiza González, actress and singer
- February 11 – Javier Aquino, footballer
- March 29 – Carlos Peña, footballer
- April 19 – Héctor Herrera, footballer
- April 26 – Jonathan dos Santos, footballer
- July 4 – Melissa Barrera, actress
- July 9 – Nataly Michel, fencer
- July 18 – Canelo Álvarez, boxer
- August 28 – Isaác Brizuela, footballer
- November 29 – Diego Boneta, actor and singer
