= 1988 in Mexico =

- Decades: 1960s; 1970s; 1980s; 1990s; 2000s
- See also: History of Mexico; List of years in Mexico; Timeline of Mexican history

Events in the year 1988 in Mexico.

== Incumbents ==
=== Federal government ===
- President: Miguel de la Madrid (until November 30), Carlos Salinas de Gortari (starting December 1)
- Interior Secretary (SEGOB): Manuel Bartlett Díaz/Fernando Gutiérrez Barrios
- Secretary of Foreign Affairs (SRE): Bernardo Sepúlveda Amor/Fernando Solana
- Communications Secretary (SCT): Daniel Díaz Díaz/Andrés Caso Lombardo
- Education Secretary (SEP): Manuel Bartlett
- Secretary of Defense (SEDENA): Juan Arévalo Gardoqui/Antonio Riviello Bazán
- Secretary of Navy: Miguel Ángel Gómez Ortega/Mauricio Scheleske Sánchez
- Secretary of Labor and Social Welfare: Arsenio Farell Cubillas
- Secretary of Welfare: Manuel Camacho Solís/Gabino Fraga/Patricio Chirinos Calero
- Secretary of Public Education: Miguel González Avelar/Manuel Bartlett Díaz
- Tourism Secretary (SECTUR): Carlos Hank González
- Secretary of the Environment (SEMARNAT): Pedro Ojeda Paullada/María de los Angeles Moreno
- Secretary of Health (SALUD): Guillermo Soberón Acevedo/Jesús Kumate Rodríguez

=== Supreme Court ===
- President of the Supreme Court: Carlos del Río Rodríguez

=== Governors ===
- Aguascalientes: Miguel Ángel Barberena Vega
- Baja California: Xicoténcatl Leyva Mortera (PRI)
- Baja California Sur: Víctor Manuel Liceaga Ruibal
- Campeche: Abelardo Carrillo Zavala
- Chiapas: Absalón Castellanos Domínguez/Patrocinio González Garrido
- Chihuahua: Fernando Baeza Meléndez
- Coahuila: Eliseo Mendoza Berrueto
- Colima: Elías Zamora Verduzco
- Durango: Armando del Castillo Franco
- Guanajuato: Rafael Corrales Ayala
- Guerrero: José Francisco Ruiz Massieu
- Hidalgo: Adolfo Lugo Verduzco
- Jalisco: Enrique Álvarez del Castillo/Francisco Rodríguez Gómez
- State of Mexico: Mario Ramón Beteta
- Michoacán: Luis Martínez Villicaña
- Morelos
  - Lauro Ortega Martínez (PRI), until May 18.
  - Antonio Riva Palacio (PRI), starting May 18.
- Nayarit: Celso Humberto Delgado Ramírez
- Nuevo León: Jorge Treviño
- Oaxaca: Heladio Ramírez López
- Puebla: Mariano Piña Olaya
- Querétaro: Mariano Palacios Alcocer
- Quintana Roo: Miguel Borge Martín
- San Luis Potosí: no data
- Sinaloa: Francisco Labastida
- Sonora: Rodolfo Félix Valdés
- Tabasco: José María Peralta López
- Tamaulipas: Américo Villarreal Guerra
- Tlaxcala: Beatriz Paredes Rangel
- Veracruz: Fernando Gutiérrez Barrios/Dante Delgado Rannauro
- Yucatán: Víctor Cervera Pacheco/Víctor Manzanilla Schaffer
- Zacatecas: Genaro Borrego Estrada
- Regent of Mexico City
  - Ramón Aguirre Velázquez
  - Manuel Camacho Solís

== Events ==
- The National Council for Culture and Arts is established.
- The Graphic Arts Institute of Oaxaca is established
- July 6: 1988 Mexican general election
- August 31 – September 8: Hurricane Debby
- September 8–19: Hurricane Gilbert

== Awards ==
- Belisario Domínguez Medal of Honor – Rufino Tamayo

== Film ==
- List of Mexican films of 1988

== Sport ==
- 1987–88 Mexican Primera División season
- Diablos Rojos del México win the Mexican League.
- Atlético Boca del Río and Venados de Yucatán are founded.
- 1988 Mexican Grand Prix
- Mexico at the 1988 Winter Olympics
- Mexico at the 1988 Summer Olympics
- Mexico at the 1988 Summer Paralympics
- 1988 Ibero-American Championships in Athletics in Mexico City.

== Births ==
- February 5 – Karin Ontiveros, beauty queen
- April 29 — Elías Hernández, footballer
- May 21 — Aída Román, archer
- November 23 — Ezequiel Orozco, soccer player (Club Necaxa), (d. 2018)

== Deaths ==
- April 25 — Roberto Salido Beltrán, military aviator (b. 1912)
- July 11 — Oscar Flores Tapia, journalist, writer, and politician (PRI); Governor of Coahuila 1975–1981 (b. 1913)
- August 9 – Ramón Valdés, Mexican actor (b. 1923)
- December 9 – Alfredo Woodward Téllez, businessman and politician (b. 1905)
