= 1989 in Mexico =

- Decades: 1960s; 1970s; 1980s; 1990s; 2000s
- See also: History of Mexico; List of years in Mexico; Timeline of Mexican history

Events in the year 1989 in Mexico.

== Incumbents ==
=== Federal government ===
- President: Carlos Salinas de Gortari
- Interior Secretary (SEGOB): Fernando Gutiérrez Barrios
- Secretary of Foreign Affairs (SRE): Fernando Solana
- Communications Secretary (SCT): Andrés Caso Lombardo
- Education Secretary (SEP): Manuel Bartlett
- Secretary of Defense (SEDENA): Antonio Riviello Bazán
- Secretary of Navy: Luis Carlos Ruano Angulo
- Secretary of Labor and Social Welfare: Arsenio Farell Cubillas
- Secretary of Welfare: Patricio Chirinos Calero
- Secretary of Public Education: Manuel Bartlett Díaz
- Tourism Secretary (SECTUR): Carlos Hank González
- Secretary of the Environment (SEMARNAT): María de los Angeles Moreno
- Secretary of Health (SALUD): Jesús Kumate Rodríguez

=== Supreme Court ===
- President of the Supreme Court: Carlos del Río Rodríguez

=== Governors ===
- Aguascalientes: Miguel Ángel Barberena Vega, (Institutional Revolutionary Party, PRI)
- Baja California
  - Xicoténcatl Leyva Mortera (PRI), until January 5
  - Oscar Baylón Chacón, (PRI), January 6 to October 31.
  - Ernesto Ruffo Appel, National Action Party (PAN), starting November 1. Ruffo Appel was the first governor who was not a member of PRI since 1929.
- Baja California Sur:
- Campeche: Miguel Ángel Barberena Vega
- Chiapas: Víctor Manuel Liceaga Ruibal
- Chihuahua: Francisco Barrio
- Coahuila: Eliseo Mendoza Berrueto
- Colima: Elías Zamora Verduzco
- Durango: Armando del Castillo Franco
- Guanajuato: Rafael Corrales Ayala
- Guerrero: José Francisco Ruiz Massieu
- Hidalgo: Adolfo Lugo Verduzco
- Jalisco: Francisco Rodríguez Gómez/Guillermo Cosío Vidaurri
- State of Mexico: Mario Ramón Beteta/Ignacio Pichardo Pagaza
- Michoacán: Genovevo Figueroa Zamudio
- Morelos: Antonio Riva Palacio (PRI).
- Nayarit: Celso Humberto Delgado Ramírez
- Nuevo León: Jorge Treviño
- Oaxaca: Heladio Ramírez López
- Puebla: Mariano Piña Olaya
- Querétaro: Mariano Palacios Alcocer
- Quintana Roo: Miguel Borge Martín
- San Luis Potosí: no data
- Sinaloa: Francisco Labastida
- Sonora: Rodolfo Félix Valdés
- Tabasco: José María Peralta López
- Tamaulipas: Américo Villarreal Guerra
- Tlaxcala: Beatriz Paredes Rangel
- Veracruz: Dante Delgado Rannauro
- Yucatán: Víctor Manzanilla Schaffer
- Zacatecas: Genaro Borrego Estrada
- Regent of Mexico City: Manuel Camacho Solís

== Events ==
- Music group Café Tacuba is founded.
- Newspaper El Economista is founded.
- The Guadalajara light rail system begins operating.
- The Santa Teresa la Antigua Alternative Art Center opens its doors.
- February 13: National Intelligence Centre (Mexico) and the National Human Rights Commission (Mexico) are founded.
- March 2: FONCA, (Fondo Nacional para la Cultura y las Artes) is founded.
- March 3: Miss Latin America 1989 held in Hermosillo, Sonora.
- May 5: The Party of the Democratic Revolution is founded.
- May 23: Miss Universe 1989 held in Cancún, Quintana Roo.
- August 10: The San Rafael River train disaster
- August 25–29: Hurricane Kiko
- October 19: The Autonomous University of Campeche is established.

== Awards ==
- Belisario Domínguez Medal of Honor – Raúl Castellano Jiménez

== Births ==
- January 8: Sandra Ramírez, FIFA assistant referee
- January 10: Zuria Vega, actress and singer
- June 7: Sofía Sisniega, actress
- September 14: Miriam Zetter, ten-pin bowler

== Deaths ==
- August 7 — Leopoldo Sánchez Celis, Governor of Sinaloa 1963–1968 (b. 1916)
- October 30 — Pedro Vargas, Mexican singer and actor (b. 1906)

== Film ==
- List of Mexican films of 1989

== Sport ==
- 1988–89 Mexican Primera División season.
- 1989 Caribbean Series in Mazatlan at the Estadio Teodoro Mariscal.
- Tecolotes de Nuevo Laredo win the Mexican League.
- 1989 Tournament of the Americas in Mexico City.
- 1989 Mexican Grand Prix.
- 1989 480 km of Mexico.
