= 1994 in Mexico =

Events in the year 1994 in Mexico.

== Incumbents ==
=== Federal government ===
- President: Carlos Salinas de Gortari (until November 30), Ernesto Zedillo (starting December 1)
- Interior Secretary (SEGOB): Patrocinio González Garrido/Jorge Carpizo McGregor/Esteban Moctezuma
- Secretary of Foreign Affairs (SRE): Manuel Camacho Solís/José Ángel Gurría
- Communications Secretary (SCT): Emilio Gamboa Patrón/Guillermo Ortiz Martínez/Carlos Ruiz Sacristán
- Secretary of Defense (SEDENA): Antonio Riviello Bazán/Enrique Cervantes Aguirre
- Secretary of Navy: Luis Carlos Ruano Angulo/José Ramón Lorenzo Franco
- Secretary of Labor and Social Welfare (STPS): Arsenio Farell Cubillas/Manuel Gómez Peralta/Santiago Oñate Laborde
- Secretary of Welfare: Carlos Rojas Gutiérrez
- Secretary of Public Education: Fernando Solana Morales/José Ángel Pescador/Fausto Alzati/Miguel Limón Rojas
- Tourism Secretary (SECTUR): Silvia Hernández Enríquez
- Secretary of the Environment (SEMARNAT): Guillermo Jiménez Morales/Julia Carabias Lillo
- Secretary of Health (SALUD): Jesús Kumate Rodríguez/Juan Ramón De La Fuente

=== Supreme Court ===
- President of the Supreme Court: Ulises Schmill Ordóñez

=== Governors ===
- Aguascalientes: Otto Granados Roldán, (Institutional Revolutionary Party, PRI)
- Baja California: Ernesto Ruffo Appel, (National Action Party PAN)
- Baja California Sur: Guillermo Mercado Romero
- Campeche: Jorge Salomón Azar García
- Chiapas: Elmar Setzer Marseille/Javier López Moreno/Eduardo Robledo Rincón
- Chihuahua: Francisco Barrio (PAN)
- Coahuila: Rogelio Montemayor Seguy (PRI)
- Colima: Carlos de la Madrid Virgen
- Durango: Maximiliano Silerio Esparza
- Guanajuato: Carlos Medina Plascencia
- Guerrero: Rubén Figueroa Alcocer (PRI)
- Hidalgo: Jesús Murillo Karam
- Jalisco: Carlos Rivera Aceves
- State of Mexico: Emilio Chuayffet (PRI)
- Michoacán: Ausencio Chávez Hernández
- Morelos
  - Antonio Riva Palacio (PRI), until May 17.
  - Jorge Carrillo Olea (PRI), starting May 18.
- Nayarit: Rigoberto Ochoa Zaragoza
- Nuevo León: Sócrates Rizzo (PRI)
- Oaxaca: Diódoro Carrasco Altamirano (PRI)
- Puebla: Manuel Bartlett Díaz (PRI)
- Querétaro: Enrique Burgos García (PRI)
- Quintana Roo: Mario Villanueva Madrid (PRI)
- San Luis Potosí: Horacio Sánchez Unzueta (PRI)
- Sinaloa: Renato Vega Alvarado (PRI)
- Sonora: Manlio Fabio Beltrones Rivera (PRI)
- Tabasco: Manuel Gurría Ordóñez (PRI)
- Tamaulipas: Manuel Cavazos Lerma (PRI)
- Tlaxcala: José Antonio Álvarez Lima (PRD)
- Veracruz: Patricio Chirinos Calero (PRD)
- Yucatán: Ricardo Ávila Heredia/Federico Granja Ricalde (PRI)
- Zacatecas: Arturo Romo Gutiérrez (PRI)
- Regent of Mexico City
  - Manuel Aguilera Gomez
  - Oscar Espinosa Villarreal

== Events ==
- January 1
  - The North American Free Trade Agreement (NAFTA) between Mexico, Canada and the United States goes into effect
  - The Zapatista Army of National Liberation goes public in response to NAFTA.
- January 16 – The Apostolic Nunciature to Mexico, Girolamo Prigione, has a secret meeting with drug lord Benjamín Arellano Félix, who was implicated in the assassination of Cardinal Juan Jesús Posadas six months earlier. He had met with Ramón Arellano Félix six weeks earlier.
- March 23 – Luis Donaldo Colosio presidential candidate for the PRI is assassinated in Tijuana, Baja California.
- August 11 – Hurricane John starts in southern Mexico
- August 21 – Presidential elections
- September 28 – José Francisco Ruiz Massieu, brother-in-law of President Carlos Salinas de Gortari, former governor of Guerrero, and leader of the Institutional Revolutionary Party is assassinated.
- October 11 – Hurricane Rosa kills four in Nayarit and Durango
- December 1 – Ernesto Zedillo takes office as President of Mexico.
- December 21 – The Popocateptl volcano spewed gas and ash, which was carried as far as 25 km (16 mi) away by prevailing winds. The activity prompted the evacuation of nearby towns and scientists to begin monitoring for an eruption.
- December
  - economic crisis in Mexico with the peso losing a third of its value
  - The Fobaproa is applied in response to the economic crisis
  - El Barzón is created in response to the economic crisis

== Awards ==
- Belisario Domínguez Medal of Honor – Jaime Sabines

== Popular culture ==
=== Sports ===
- July 5 – Mexico loses 1–3 versus Bulgaria and is eliminated from the Football World Cup 1994

=== Film ===
- June 6 – The XXXVI edition of the Ariel Award by the Mexican Academy of Film takes place at the Palacio de Bellas Artes in Mexico City
- El callejón de los milagros of Jorge Fons
- Bienvenido-Welcome of Gabriel Retes
- Dos crímenes of Roberto Sneider
- Hasta morir of Fernando Sariñana
- El jardín del edén of María Novaro
- La reina de la noche of Arturo Ripstein
- Mujeres insumisas of Alberto Isaac
- Dulces compañías of Oscar Blancarte
- Un volcán con lava de hielo (short) of Valentina Leduc
- El árbol de la música (short) of Sabina Berman & Isabel Tardán
- Del otro lado del mar (short) of Marcela Arteaga

=== TV ===
==== Telenovelas ====
- Dos mujeres, un camino, on Televisa
- Marimar, on Televisa
- Volver a empezar, on Televisa

== Births ==
- August 13 – Andrea Meza, model, Miss Universe 2020
- October 17 – Alejandra Valencia, archer
- November 8 – Víctor Hugo Saldaña Gutiérrez, footballer; (d. 2017).

== Deaths ==
- February 3 – Raúl Padilla (75), actor and comedian (b. 1918)
- March 23 – Luis Donaldo Colosio (43), candidate to the Presidency of Mexico (b. 1950)
- March 25 – Angelines Fernández (69), actress and comedian (b. 1924)
- September 28 – José Francisco Ruiz Massieu (48), politician, assassinated (b. 1946)
