= Farell =

Farell is a surname, and may refer to:

- Arsenio Farell (1921–2005), Mexican politician
- Claude Farell (1918–2008), Austrian actress
- Kevin Farell (born 1996), Bolivian footballer
- Luis Farell (1902–1977), Mexican Air Force general
- Mary Jane Farell (1920–2015), American bridge player

== See also ==
- Farel, surname
- Farrell (surname)
