= Américo Villarreal =

Américo Villarreal may refer to:

- Américo Villarreal Guerra (1931–2010), Mexican politician and civil engineer
- Américo Villarreal Anaya (born 1958), Mexican politician and cardiologist, son of the above
