= Farrell =

Farrell (anglicization of the Irish Ó Fearghail) is a surname and may refer to:

- Farrell (surname)
- Farrell Lines, shipping company (acquired by Maersk)
- Farrell, Mississippi, a census-designated place in Mississippi
- Farrell, Nevada, a ghost town in Nevada
- Farrell, Pennsylvania, a city in Pennsylvania
- Farrell (clothing label), fronted by Robbie Williams
- Farrells, an architecture firm
- Farrell's Ice Cream Parlour
- Monsignor Farrell High School, private Catholic high school

== See also ==
- Arsenio Farell (1921–2005), Mexican politician
- Farell Duclair (born 1972), Canadian football player
- Luis Farell (1902–1977), General of the Mexican Air Force
- Faryl Smith (born 1995), British mezzo-soprano
- Pharrell Williams (born 1973), American hip-hop artist
