= Farnell =

Farnell is an English surname derived from places named Farnell across Britain. Farnell comes from Old English fearn meaning "fern" and hyll meaning "hill". Notable people with the surname include:

- Anthony Farnell (born 1978), English boxer
- George Stanley Farnell (1861–95), classical scholar and educator, brother of Lewis Richard, below
- James Farnell (1825–1888), Australian politician
- Lewis Richard Farnell (1856–1934), Oxford classical scholar

== See also ==
- Farnall, a surname
- Farnell, Angus, Scotland
- Farnell (cocktail), a drink first served in Park City, Utah
- Premier Farnell, British electronic component distributor
- J. K. Farnell, English manufacturing company best known for soft toys
- Farrell (disambiguation)
- Farwell (disambiguation)
