= Farel =

Farel is a surname, and may refer to:

- Julien Farel (born 1968), French hairstylist
- Pierre Farel (born 1957), French painter
- William Farel (1489–1565), French reformer

== See also ==
- Farell
- Farrell (surname)
