= Democratic Center Party of Mexico =

Democratic Center Party Partido de Centro Democrático
- Abbreviation: PCD
- President: Manuel Camacho Solís
- General Secretary: Marcelo Ebrard
- Founder: Manuel Camacho Solís & Marcelo Ebrard
- Founded: 1999
- Dissolved: 2000-2004
- Membership (2000): 120,000
- Ideology: Centrism
- Political position: Centre

The Party of the Democratic Center (Spanish: Partido de Centro Democrático, PCD) was a political party in Mexico between 1999 and 2000. The PCD defined itself as a centrist party and was founded by Manuel Camacho Solís, who was its only leader and presidential candidate in the 2000 Mexican general election; the party never managed to have a true political presence.

== History ==
=== Dissolution ===
In the presidential elections of 2 July 2000, its candidate Manuel Camacho Solís won 0.6% of the popular vote. In the senatorial elections of the same date, the party won 1.4% but no seats in the Senate. Since it did not secure parliamentary representation in 2003 it is not currently a nationally recognized party. During the same time, the elections for Head of Government of the Federal District were held. Marcelo Ebrard had declined to candidate in favor of PRD candidate Andrés Manuel López Obrador.

It retained its registration at a local level in Tlaxcala for a few more years, where under the name of the Tlaxcala Democratic Center Party (PCDT), it participated in an alliance with the National Action Party, with the candidate of the alliance Héctor Ortiz Ortiz triumphing although eventually losing local registration, thus dissolving the party.
