= Farnall =

Farnall is a surname. Notable people with the surname include:

- Harry Farnall (1838–1891), New Zealand politician
- Thomas Farnall (1874–1927), English footballer

== See also ==
- Farnell, a surname
