= San Rafael River train wreck =

Railway accident in Mexico

San Rafael River train disaster

Details
- Date: 10 August 1989
- Location: Near Guasave, Sinaloa
- Country: Mexico
- Operator: FNM
- Incident type: Bridge collapse under train

Statistics
- Trains: 1
- Deaths: 112
- Injured: 205

The San Rafael River train disaster occurred at around 04:00 on 10 August 1989, when the Rio Bamoa Bridge collapsed under an 11-car train operated by Ferrocarriles Nacionales de México, traveling from Mazatlán, Sinaloa, to Mexicali, Baja California. Several cars fell into the San Rafael River. The bridge's supports had been damaged by heavy rains, causing them to fail. Of the approximately 330 people on the train, 112 perished, most by drowning, and 205 were injured, making it Mexico's second deadliest peacetime rail disaster.
