= Fobaproa =

Mexican emergency money reserve

Fobaproa (from the Spanish: Fondo Bancario de Protección al Ahorro, lit. 'Savings Protection Banking Fund') was a contingencies fund created in 1990 by the Mexican government, led by then dominant Institutional Revolutionary Party (PRI), to attempt to resolve liquidity problems of the banking system. The contingencies fund was applied in 1995 during the Mexican peso crisis to protect Mexican banks. In 1998, it was replaced by Instituto para la Protección al Ahorro Bancario (Bank Savings Protection Institute), Mexico's current deposit insurance agency.

In the years following the peso crisis, Fobaproa and its resulting debt has become a subject of controversy in Mexican politics. Beneficiaries of the fund were companies favored by the country's political leadership and were implicated in a number of corruption cases. The management of the Fobaproa funds drew significant criticism by Mexico's then two main opposition parties, the Party of the Democratic Revolution and the National Action Party, where it represented a prominent issue during the 2000 Mexican general election.

== Background ==
In 1982, at the end of the presidency of José López Portillo (December 1976–December 1982) the government found itself unable to meet demands for United States dollars and devaluated the peso from a value of 26 to 47 pesos per dollar. A consequence was an extremely high default debt. The López Portillo administration then decided to nationalize the banking system on September 1 of the same year, paying 3 trillion pesos (approximately 63 billion dollars at 47 pesos/dollar exchange rate) to acquire public and private credit institutions who had an accumulated debt of 25 billion dollars. The following year, in the middle of an economic crisis, president Miguel de la Madrid (December 1982–December 1988) created the FICORCA (Fideicomiso de Cobertura de Riesgo Cambiario or "Exchange risk coverage fund") financed by a loan that would also finance the fiscal deficit, the external debt and the economic activity of the country. This fund saved twenty of the largest companies of the country from bankruptcy; these companies owed 12 billion dollars through notes with the Banco de México. On November 10, 1986, the FONAPRE (Fondo de Apoyo Preventivo a las Instituciones de Banca Múltiple or "Fund of preventive support to banking institutions") was founded to preserve the financial stability of banks, with the government having banks as trustees. By 1987, a parallel finance industry had been created with brokering firms and investment societies. To continue attracting investors, interest rates increased at the Bolsa Mexicana de Valores, and with the crash in the New York Stock Exchange, the national banking system was deeply affected and another devaluation came as a result.

== Creation of the fund ==
In 1990, in an attempt to prevent situations similar to those of the previous two administrations, the government of Carlos Salinas de Gortari instituted the Fobaproa, a contingency fund for extraordinary financial problems. The Fobaproa would assume outstanding debt and would capitalize banks in the advent of economic crises that would present liquidity problems for these institutions. The following year hundreds of companies the government owned were privatized, in an attempt to reduce government expenses and to liberalize the economy. Eighteen banks were sold at 37.8 billion pesos for a total of 61.6 billion pesos for all 409 companies.

== 1994 economic crisis ==
In December 1994 during the government of Ernesto Zedillo (December 1994–December 2000), after 6 years of battling with inflation, an overvalued peso, the reduction of international dollar reserves, political scandals in 1994 in Mexico and other factors caused one of the worst economic crisis in the recent history of Mexico. Skyrocketing interest rates caused that many companies were unable to meet payments while others withdrew massive amounts of capital. With the risk of another financial collapse the Fobaproa was applied in 1995.

The Fobaproa assumed debt for 552 billion pesos. Not applying the Fobaproa would have likely caused an interruption of credit and withdrawal from saving accounts for millions of families and thousands of companies. In January 1995 the Procapte (Programa de Capitalización Temporal (Procapte) or "Temporary capitalization program") was created while the Fobaproa was assuming outstanding debt to banks. The Procapte allowed faster access to a higher volume of foreign capital and the solvency of banks. A condition for Fobaproa to assume the debt was that stockholders of these financial institutions would re-invest their capital.

In 1996 the Ucabe (Unidad Coordinadora para el Acuerdo Bancario Empresarial (Ucabe) or "Coordinating unit for the Bank-Entrepreneur Agreement") was created so that debt could be re-structured through it. 54 companies took advantage of the Ucabe to re-structure 9.7 billion dollars and avoid defaults.

=== Preventive measures ===
In March 1998, the Zedillo cabinet presented to the Congress of Mexico four initiatives to create a legal framework to reduce the risk of another banking crisis and to create more efficient mechanisms to supervise the credit activity and to ensure bank capitalization. This package would demand more discipline in the administration of the banking system and propose the Fogade (Fondo de Garantía de Depósito or "Deposit guarantee fund") to protect the capital of small and medium savings holders. Another initiative was the creation of the Comisión para la Recuperación de Bienes ("Commission for the recovery of assets") to recover and administer assets that the Fobaproa and the Fameval (Fondo de Apoyo al Mercado de Valores or "Support fund for the Stock Market") acquired after the crisis.

=== Executive and Legislative Branch agreements ===
In September 1998, the government of Ernesto Zedillo and the groups of the PAN, PRD, PRI, PT and PVEM in Congress agreed on establishing a framework of agreements to approve the presidential initiatives. The agreements contemplated the creation of supervision mechanisms to oversee credit activities, to study the legality of financial operations associated with the Fobaproa, to establish legal frameworks to prevent new financial crises, to punish those who illegally benefited from or permitted unlawful operations and to support small and medium-sized entrepreneurs and a more equitable distribution of the costs of the Fobaproa.

== Controversies and political response ==
The last initiative was to convert to public debt the amount of 552 billion pesos the Fobaproa assumed. This caused Congress to order an audit and to freeze the initiatives until the completion of such audit. In July 1998, the Secretaría de Hacienda y Crédito Público (SHCP, the Mexican Office of Revenue) approved Congress to analyze all operations associated with the Fobaproa. Congress also held hearings with several officers and ex-officers, entrepreneurs and bankers to discover any fraud that might have taken place during the Fobaproa. Much of the payable debt was also classified as unpayable, and no investigations were made to know if there was any amount that could be recovered.

=== PRD ===
The Party of the Democratic Revolution ("Partido de la Revolución Democrática" or PRD) published a document titled Fobaproa: El gran atentado contra la economía. Alternativas para impedirlo (Fobaproa: The great attack against the economy. Alternatives to prevent it) and opposed the conversion of private debt to public debt. The PRD also demanded legal action against government officers and business people that mismanaged the funds, and to restrict support to small and medium-size investors. On August 4 of the same year the PRD made public a list of those who benefited from the Fobaproa amidst accusations by the SHCP, the Ministry of the Interior of violations to the law of banking secrecy. The president of the PRD, Andrés Manuel López Obrador declared that it would be "unconstitutional" to convert the funds owed by investors and bankers into public debt.

=== PAN ===
On August 20 of the same year the National Action Party ("Partido Acción Nacional" or PAN) published the document Propuestas de solución integral a la crisis bancaria ("Proposals for an integral solution to the banking crisis") and declared that not only external factors were involved in the economic crisis but also the inefficiency and corruption in the administration of banks. One of the proposals was the creation of a Instituto para el Seguro de Depósitos Bancarios ("Institute for the Insurance of Bank Deposits") supervised by Congress and to protect funds of saving-holders.

=== PRI ===
A week later, on August 28 the Institutional Revolutionary Party ("Partido Revolucionario Institucional" or PRI) proposed the reduction of 30% of the debt assumed by the Fobaproa and that banks assumed the risk they had agreed to when the debt was acquired by the government: 45% for mortgage loans and 60% for fishing and agricultural groups. They also demanded denying bail to white collar employees involved with corruption and a stricter supervision of banks.
