= Américo Villarreal Anaya =

Mexican politician and cardiologist

Governor of Tamaulipas
- Incumbent
- Assumed office 1 October 2022
- Preceded by: Francisco Javier García Cabeza de Vaca

Personal details
- Born: 23 May 1958 (age 68) Ciudad Victoria, Tamaulipas
- Party: National Regeneration Movement (2017–present); Institutional Revolutionary Party (1983–2017)
- Spouse: María de la Luz Santiago Diez
- Children: 3
- Education: Universidad La Salle México
- Occupation: Politician and cardiologist

Américo Villarreal Anaya (born 23 May 1958) is a Mexican cardiologist and politician affiliated with the National Regeneration Movement and the current Governor of Tamaulipas. He previously served as a Senator for the state.

== Early life and education ==
He is the son of Américo Villarreal Guerra, who served as Governor of Tamaulipas from 1987 to 1993. He attended the Mexican School of Medicine at the Universidad La Salle México in Mexico City.

== Career ==
Villarreal joined the Institutional Revolutionary Party (PRI) in 1983. As a cardiologist, he worked at the General Hospital of Ciudad Victoria, eventually becoming director of the hospital.

=== Senate tenure ===
In 2018, he was elected Senate of Mexico as a member of the National Regeneration Movement. During his tenure in the Senate, Villarreal chaired the chamber's Health Commission.

=== Gubernatorial tenure ===
In 2022, Villarreal succeeded Francisco Javier García Cabeza de Vaca as Governor of Tamaulipas. As Governor, Villarreal established the State Health Committee of Tamaulipas.
