= Julien Farel =

French hairstylist (born 1968)

Julien Farel (born 1968) is a French hairstylist. He was born and raised in Montfaucon-en-Velay, Auvergne, France, a small commune southeast of Lyon.

== Career ==
In 2001, Julien Farel established a salon on Madison Avenue, New York City. The salon's success led to further expansions, including locations in Miami, Florida, and Cabo San Lucas. JF Express, an anti-aging hair bar, was introduced at the Setai on Fifth Avenue. In 2007, he and his team were appointed as the hairstylists for tennis players at the US Open.

== Farel Haircare ==
Farel launched Julien Farel Haircare in 2011. The product line, formulated with hyaluronic acid, aims to address hair aging.

== Personal life ==
Farel married Suelyn Bogdanoff in 2004 at the Villa Ephrussi de Rothschild in Saint-Jean-Cap-Ferrat, France.
