= Roberto Salido Beltrán =

Roberto Salido Beltrán (1912–1988) was a noted Mexican military aviator. He was born on October 8, 1912, in Alamos, Sonora, Mexico and died in Mexico City on April 25, 1988.

== Education and career ==
In 1932, Salido Beltrán graduated as Firearms officer from the Military College and on 1 March 1937, he graduated as Second lieutenant pilot from the Aviation Military School.

With the Air Regiment Salido Beltrán participated in the campaign against Saturnino Cedillo. He did several flying lessons in the United States, was an instructor at the Superior War School and was later incorporated into the Mexican Expeditionary Air Force, as Chief of Staff, through which he participated in the Philippines campaign during World War II.

He graduated from the War College in 1952 and rose to Brigadier General. He was deputy chief of the Mexican Air Force and as director of the Military Aviation School, coordinated the work for the creation of the Air College which entered service, under his leadership, on September 15, 1959.

Roberto Salido Beltrán was military attaché at the Embassy of Mexico in U.S. and Major General, when on 1 January 1964 he took over the leadership of the Mexican Air Force, a post which he held throughout the administration. After leaving this command he went into retirement.

== Legacy ==
Salido Beltrán was also a writer, having contributed to newspapers and magazines. He wrote Táctica General Aérea (General Air Tactics), Táctica de Bombardeo Aéreo (Air Bombardment Tactics), Sumario de Operaciones Aeroterrestres (Summary of Air-Ground Operations), Camñpanas de Morelos en 1812 (1812 Morelos Campaigns) and Quetzalcoatl.

At the time of his death in Mexico City, on April 25, 1988, he held numerous national and foreign decorations.
