= Kevin Farell =

Bolivian footballer (born 1996)

Personal information
- Full name: Alan Kevin Farell Cuéllar
- Date of birth: 27 March 1996 (age 30)
- Place of birth: Santa Cruz de la Sierra, Bolivia
- Height: 1.67 m (5 ft 5 1/2 in)
- Position: Attacking midfielder

Team information
- Current team: Real Santa Cruz
- Number: 11

Youth career
- Academía Tahuichi

Senior career*
Years	Team	Apps	(Gls)
2013–2016	Academía Tahuichi		
2013–2014	→ Florida (loan)		
2014–2016	→ Callejas (loan)		
2016	→ Blooming (loan)	2	(0)
2016–2021	Blooming	95	(4)
2022–	Real Santa Cruz	4	(2)
- * Club domestic league appearances and goals as of 20:22, 13 March 2022 (UTC)

Alan Kevin Farell Cuéllar (born 27 March 1996) is a Bolivian footballer who plays for Real Santa Cruz as an attacking midfielder.

== Club career ==
Born in Santa Cruz de la Sierra, Farell was an Academía Tahuichi youth graduate. After making his senior debut with hometown's Club Florida, he moved to Callejas in 2014.

Farell joined LFPB side Blooming on 5 February 2016, initially on loan until June. He made his debut for the club on 7 May, coming on as a late substitute for Didí Torrico in a 2–0 away loss against Nacional Potosí.

Bought outright ahead of the 2016–17 season, Farell was made a starter by manager Mauricio Soria. He scored his first professional goal on 16 October 2016, netting the third in a 4–0 away routing of Guabirá.

== International career ==
On 4 November 2016, Farell was called up by Bolivia national team manager Ángel Hoyos for two 2018 FIFA World Cup qualification matches against Venezuela and Paraguay. However, he remained unused in both matches.
