= El Barzón =

El Barzón is a movement of middle class private business and farming interests in Mexico.

A Barzón, in terms of agriculture, is the yoke-ring to which a rope or chain is attached to pull a farm plow; a hitch-ring, connecting-ring, a pull-ring. The name comes from a Mexican revolutionary song that speaks about injustice in the fields of the countryside. Their motto is: "Debo, no niego, pago lo justo" ("I owe, I don't deny it, I'll pay what is fair").

Members of El Barzón were responsible for massive amounts of debt denominated in dollars; which they were expected to pay back with a peso worth half of its previous value. Their debts would amount to ten times the loan they had originally taken out, and El Barzón refers to the massive social movement where elements of the traditionally quiet middle class rose up and refused to pay the monstrous sums of money that were expected of them by lending institutions. It was an accepted public venting of frustrations and helped to set up the PRI's demise in the 2000 presidential elections.

El Barzón is a decentralized movement, and there were actually two main organizations, one that kept a pro-PRI stance and another that took a more leftist approach, siding with the PRD. There were several statewide organizations where debtors would receive legal and group support in exchange for a fee. Maximiano Barbosa Llamas founded this movement in Jalisco, Mexico. He was the most important leader of El Barzón A.C. Also he won a position on the congress by 1997.

One of the groups consisted of long-time members and supporters of the ruling Partido Revolucionario Institucional (PRI) after the devaluation in December 1994 of the Mexican peso. This devaluation occurred during the Zedillo administration, but the administration blamed the outgoing President Salinas).

== History ==
In 1994, Mexico had unprecedented economic growth. Analysts even suggested that the country was in the verge of becoming a first-world country. In December Carlos Salinas de Gortari left the presidency and was campaigning to become the leader of the World Trade Organization. At the start of the term of President Ernesto Zedillo, the event known as the December mistake started the 1994 economic crisis where the peso suffered a devaluation from 3 to 6 pesos a dollar.

Many Mexican businesses, during the last years had acquired debts in dollars, or depended heavily on supplies from the United States. Their debt was increased automatically, worsened by the contingency measures that raised interest rates drastically. Many businesses were forced to close and there were several well-publicized suicides.

In this context, several middle-class businessmen, many from agricultural backgrounds, started to make uncoordinated protests starting mainly in northern states such as Chihuahua and Sonora. From these movements some leaders started to organize the seeds of El Barzón. In Zacatecas, Manuel Ortega González, Juan José Quirino Salas and Alfonso Ramírez Cuéllar started a movement that started protests such as partial road blocks using farm equipment. El Barzón has an institutional and juridical step 13 October 1994, in Monterrey, N. L. In that city, the heart of the neoliberalism in México, with Liliana Flores Benavides, Manuel Ortega González, Juan José Quirino Salas and Alfonso Ramírez Cuéllar designed the strategy of these unique social movement in the world.

The leaders of the movement were given prison sentences but were later released. Juan Quirino then became a national leader that created and organized Unión Nacional de Productores Agropecuarios, Comerciantes, Industriales y Prestadores de Servicios El Barzón A.C. in the whole country. The movement grew rapidly and soon every state had at least one representation. At that time it was a common banking practice to hire legal advisers who specialized in credit recovery. A frequent tactic was to write intimidating legal letters or place phone calls that threatened recipients with jail, property seizing and other legal measures to pressure and force people to pay. El Barzón provided legal counselling to advise debtors on how to defend their property and renegotiate their debts in better terms.

== Criticism ==
El Barzón has been criticized as being a movement that promotes a culture of ignoring debt through the use of legal or social pressure channels. The group presents itself however as a natural result of liberal economic policies gone wrong. They claim not to ignore debt but just to get a fair deal that works for both debtors and credit institutions alike.
