= Alfredo Woodward Téllez =

Mexican businessman and politician

Alfredo Woodward Téllez (9 December 1905 – 25 April 1988) was a Mexican businessman, politician, and member of the Institutional Revolutionary Party. He served in the Congress of Colima.

== Career ==
Woodward arrived in Manzanillo, Colima, as manager of the customs agency, Alberto P. Rojas and sons, a powerful business that was based at the corner of Calle Donceles in Mexico City and had branches in Veracruz, Tamaulipas, Chihuahua, Chiapas, Oaxaca, Sinaloa, Sonora and Texas. He held many other types of employment before becoming an entrepreneur, such as police, driver, desk clerk, carrier, and film actor.

Woodward came to possess, in addition, a whole fishing fleet. During World War II he was devoted to fishing for shark and hammerhead, exporting large quantities of shark parts to be used for the manufacture of vitamin A. Together with Guillermo Adachi and Luis Garcia Castillo, he was one of the most active promoters of the International Tournament of Sailfishing in Manzanillo, participating in the sport for many years.

== Political career ==
Woodward was a local deputy to the Congress of Colima for the XXXVII Legislature (1954–1955). He was municipal president of Manzanillo from 1951 to 1954. He was Communicator of the Beacons of the Navy Department in the Mexican Pacific.

== Personal life and legacy ==
Woodward was born in Oaxaca City, Oaxaca, on December 9, 1905, and died of natural causes on April 25, 1988. He was the son of American civil engineer William John Woodward and Josefina Tellez Gil. The couple met in Oaxaca while William was working for the Mexican government.

Woodward's name is linked to the work and policies of the Manzanillo port, either through the customs business of his son Guillermo Woodward Rojas or through Alfredo Woodward Rojas, former candidate for president and municipal councilor for the Democratic Revolutionary Party.

Preceded by Herminio Barreda Mora	Municipal President of Manzanillo, Colima; 1951–1954	Succeeded by Daniel Sánchez Velasco
