= Carlos Rivera Aceves =

Mexican politician (born 1941

Governor of Jalisco
- In office 1 May 1992 – 1 March 1995
- Preceded by: Guillermo Cosío Vidaurri
- Succeeded by: Alberto Cárdenas Jiménez

Federal deputy for Jalisco's 16th district
- In office 1979–1982

Federal deputy for Jalisco's 13th district
- In office 1973–1976

Personal details
- Born: 29 June 1941 (age 84); Guadalajara, Jalisco, Mexico
- Political party: PRI

Carlos Rivera Aceves (Note: In this Spanish name, the first or paternal surname is Rivera and the second or maternal family name is Aceves.) (born 29 June 1941) is a Mexican politician from the Institutional Revolutionary Party (PRI). He has been elected twice to the Chamber of Deputies and served as governor of Jalisco from 1992 to 1995.

== Political career ==
Carlos Rivera Aceves was born on 29 June 1941 in Guadalajara, Jalisco. He earned a law degree from the University of Guadalajara in 1962 and, in his early years, worked as a schoolteacher.

He was elected to his first term in Congress in the 1973 mid-term election, representing Jalisco's 13th district. Six years later, in the 1979 mid-terms, he returned to Congress for Jalisco's 16th district. He has also served two terms in the Congress of Jalisco and was the municipal president of Zapopan, Jalisco.

On 22 April 1992, a series of sewer explosions in Guadalajara's sector Reforma destroyed 20 city blocks and killed hundreds. In the aftermath, and under pressure from the federal government of Carlos Salinas de Gortari, Governor of Jalisco Guillermo Cosío Vidaurri resigned on 30 April. Rivera Aceves was appointed interim governor in Cosío's stead, where he coordinated the reconstruction effort and oversaw official compensation payments.

He continued to serve as governor until 1 March 1995, when he handed over the governorship to Alberto Cárdenas Jiménez. Cárdenas was the state's first governor from the opposition National Action Party (PAN) and, until Aristóteles Sandoval took office in 2013, Rivera Aceves was the last to come from the ranks of the PRI.
