= Mario Villanueva =

Mexican politician

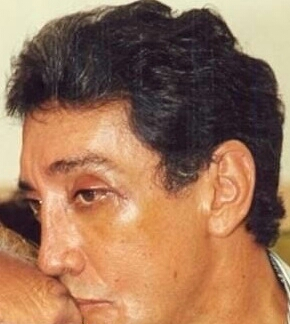

4th Governor of Quintana Roo
- In office 5 April 1993 – 4 April 1999
- Preceded by: Miguel Borge Martín
- Succeeded by: Joaquín Hendricks Díaz

Personal details
- Born: 2 July 1948 (age 78) Chetumal, Quintana Roo
- Party: Institutional Revolutionary Party
- Spouse: Isabel Tenorio
- Profession: Agronomist; Politician

Mario Ernesto Villanueva Madrid, sometimes known as "El Chueco", (born 2 July 1948) is a Mexican politician who built an important political career within the ranks of the Partido Revolucionario Institucional (PRI). From 1993 to 1999 he served as the fourth governor of the state of Quintana Roo. Accused of drug trafficking at the end of his gubernatorial period, he did not arrive at the ceremony at which he was to hand the office over to his elected successor, Joaquín Hendricks Díaz, and remained a fugitive from justice for two years. He served a six-year prison sentence, and was extradited to the United States on 8 May 2010.

== Professional and political career ==
Born in Chetumal, Quintana Roo, Villanueva studied agronomy at the Universidad Autónoma de Chihuahua. He was elected presidente municipal (mayor) of Benito Juárez, Quintana Roo, in 1990 (the municipality that includes Cancún) but resigned that position the following year to contest a seat representing Quintana Roo in the federal Senate, which he won. He resigned as senator to run for governor of the state, to which he was elected in 1993.

== Governor of Quintana Roo ==
During his time as governor he promoted the development of the Riviera Maya tourist area, located to the south of Cancún. In 1993 he created the new municipality of Solidaridad in that region, with its municipal seat in Playa del Carmen.

== Criminal allegations ==
Criminal charges accusing Villanueva of involvement in cocaine shipments passing through his state were filed while he was still serving as governor. Federal Assistant Attorney General Mariano Herrán interviewed him at the governor's mansion in Chetumal. Fearing that he would be arrested at the end of his governorship, when his immunity (fuero) expired, he disappeared from public view two weeks before the hand-over date.

He was arrested over two years later, on 24 May 2001, in a chance vehicle inspection near Cancún. He was convicted of money-laundering offences (but cleared of drug-trafficking and organized crime charges) and spent six years in the Altiplano High-Security Prison in Almoloya de Juárez, Estado de México. He was released on 21 June 2007 but was immediately taken back into custody to face proceedings under an extradition request filed by the United States District Court for the Southern District of New York on charges related to cocaine trafficking. After a lengthy process that included the lodging of amparo constitutional relief remedies, the extradition request was granted by the Secretariat of Foreign Affairs on 7 November 2007. On 4 June 2008, while in custody awaiting extradition to the United States, a federal judge found him guilty of the original drug trafficking charges and extended his original six-year sentence to 36 years and 9 months in prison.

On 8 May 2010, Villanueva was extradited to the United States. He was arraigned in a New York court and pleaded not guilty to drug-trafficking and money-laundering charges.

On 29 June 2013, Villanueva was sentenced in New York, United States, to 11 years in prison after being accused of conspiring to import hundreds of tons of cocaine and launder millions of dollars in bribe payments. In 2012, he pleaded guilty to conspiracy to commit money laundering. He was sentenced to 11 years in prison but, having been imprisoned since his 2001 arrest, he was expected to only serve three more years in prison.

Starting in 2018, Villanueva was held prisoner in Chetumal, but on 24 December 2019, President Andrés Manuel López Obrador spoke about a pardon by the end of the year. Villanueva may be placed under house arrest until the pardon comes through.

On 10 June 2020, Villanueva was released from prison into house arrest.

Preceded by Miguel Borge Martín	Governor of Quintana Roo; 5 April 1993 to 5 April 1999	Succeeded by Joaquín Hendricks Díaz
Preceded by María Cristina Sangri Aguilar	Senator for Quintana Roo; 1991 to 1993	Succeeded by José Epifanio Godoy Hernández
Preceded by José González Zapata	Municipal President of Benito Juárez, Quintana Roo; 1990 to 1991	Succeeded by Jorge Arturo Contreras
