= Luis Farell =

Mexican Air Force general (1902–1977)

Luis Farell Cubillas
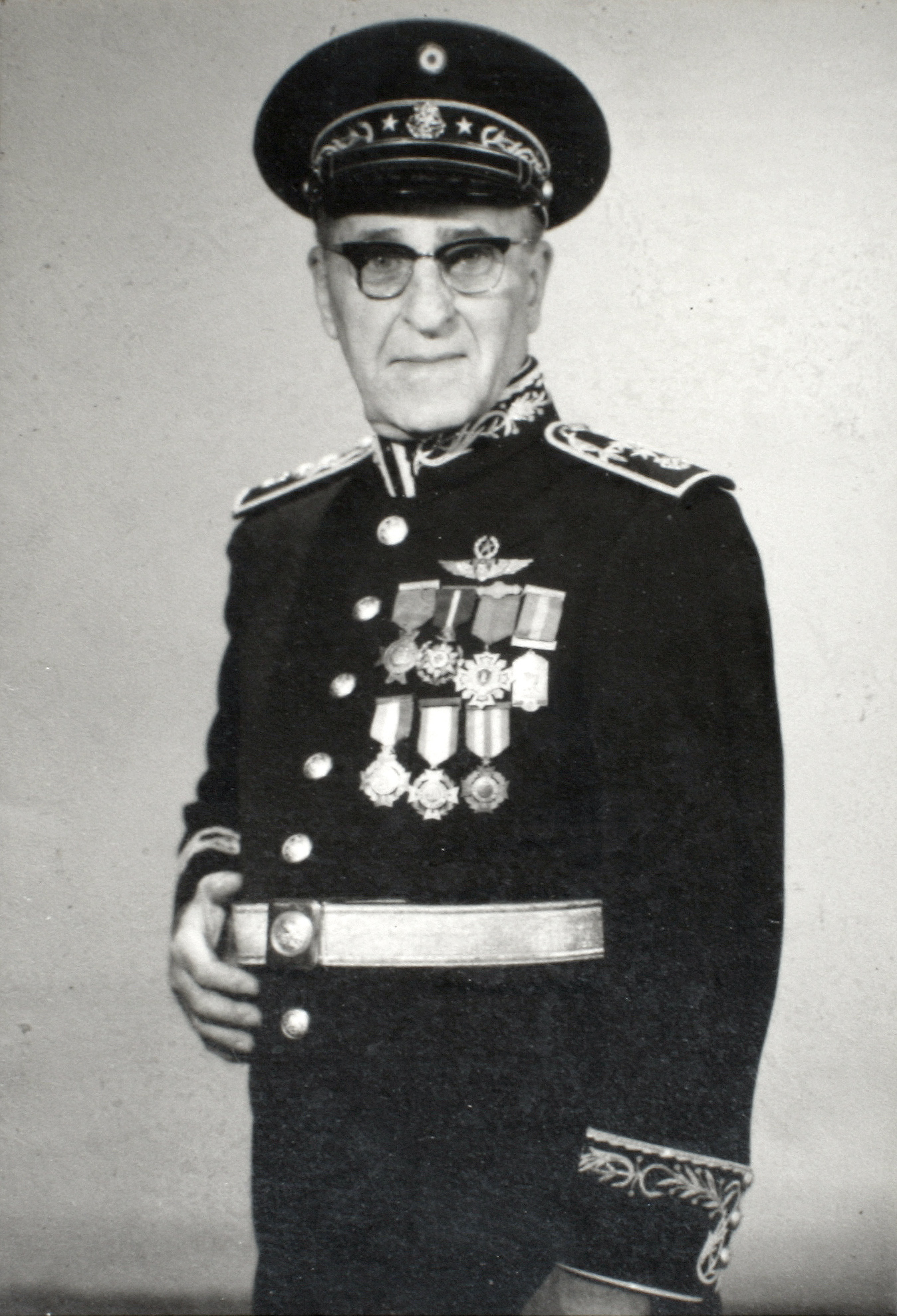
- General Luis Farell Cubillas in 1964.
- Born: September 27, 1902; San Pedro de las Colonias, Coahuila, Mexico.
- Died: July 17, 1977 (aged 74) Mexico City.
- Allegiance: Mexico
- Branch: Mexican Air Force
- Service years: 1920–1964
- Rank: Division General of the Mexican Air Force.
- Conflicts: Adolfo de la Huerta coup, Cristero War, Yaqui Campaign, Arnulfo Gomez coup, José Escobar coup, Saturnino Cedillo revolt.
- Awards: Cruz de Guerra. Mérito Aeronáutico. Mérito Doscente. Institutional Perseverance. Honor Medal (by Cuba, 1936).

Luis Farell Cubillas (September 27, 1902 – July 17, 1977) was a Mexican Air Force combat pilot during the Revolution of the 1920s. He fought against Adolfo de la Huerta, the Yaqui rebels, General Arnulfo R. Gomez, against the Cristeros and accomplished several bombing and strafing missions against the military coup headed by General José Gonzalo Escobar and the revolt by General Saturnino Cedillo. Farell retired from active service as a Division General while being Sub-Chief of the Mexican Air Force.

== Early life ==
Farell Cubillas was born in San Pedro de las Colonias, Coahuila, Mexico, being son of Consuelo Cubillas Gutiérrez – a native of Santander, Spain- and the jeweler Enrique Farell Solá – a native of Lerida, Catalonia, Spain. Luis Farell had 11 siblings, including the senior politician Arsenio Farell Cubillas.

== Training ==
Luis Farell attended school in Mexico City and in February 1911 at the age of 9 years and along with 30,000 spectators, Farell witnessed the aerial exhibition of the Moisant brothers with Blériot airplanes carried out in the fields of Balbuena in Mexico City. In 1920, at the age of 18 years, Farell graduated as accountant just after the military-political events that caused the fall of President Venustiano Carranza. This rebellion had three important leaders: General Alvaro Obregón, General Plutarco Elías Calles and Adolfo de la Huerta. In August 1920, the President Adolfo de la Huerta hired three famous veteran and foreign pilots of World War I with the purpose of training Mexican pilots in modern tactics and organizing a functional air force. The foreign instructors were the American Ralph O'Neill, the German Fritz Bieler and the French instructor Joe Ben Lievre. Ralph O'Neill was designated as Chief Instructor of the Military school of Aviation and under orders of General Gustavo Salinas; the Mexican instructors were Alberto Carranza, Horacio Ruiz Gaviño and the brothers Juan Pablo Aldasoro and Eduardo Aldasoro.

When the Mexican government announced recruitment of aviators for the new Mexican Air Force, Farell applied on July 12, 1920, and enrolled as a cadet on November 11, 1920. This was a time at which, given the shortage produced by the war in Europe, Mexico had only 18 airplanes: four Brown Special biplanes and some TNCA made in Mexico. O'Neill reported to General Calles that most of the fleet available (13 airplanes in good condition and 5 in disrepair) had to be replaced since they were obsolete and worn away. Therefore, Mexico acquired some English Avro 504K and Avro 504J airplanes, which later would be made in Mexico with the name Avro Anáhuac. In addition, in May 1920 Mexico acquired thirteen twin-engine bombers Farman F.50.

Luis Farell graduated on April 24 of 1922 with the degree of Lieutenant and was initially assigned to the 'Observation and Bombing Squadron'. His lower scores were fencing and English language, while his higher scores were use of firearms and landings to the mark with obstructions. On January 11, 1925, he was commissioned to become a flight instructor and on May 24, 1926, he travelled to the United States to undergo a special aeronautics course in the military school located in Brooks Field, Texas.

== Rebellion of Adolfo de la Huerta ==
On December 7 of 1923, ex-President Adolfo de la Huerta launched a military coup later called the delahuertista rebellion against the government of President Alvaro Obregón. The situation was extremely critical because along with de la Huerta, about sixty percent of the army revolted, including various high ranking Generals across Mexico. Mexico quickly reequipped and reorganized the military aviation and, with the help of the United States, it received new combat airplanes consisting of several de Havilland DH-4B with Liberty motor, armed with Lewis and Vickers machine guns and able to carry bombs.
During December 10–21 of 1923, Farell's squadron made explorations and bombings on San Marcos, Aguascalientes, San Carlos Fortress in Perote, Veracruz and Puente de Ixtla, Morelos. Then, Farell attacked enemy convoys in Iguala, Pachuca and intermediate locations in company of his friend Squadron Commander Roberto Fierro VIllalobos.

On December 11, 1923, the important city of Puebla was taken by enemy forces and, eleven days later on December 22, and in company of pilot and artilleryman Lieutenant Guillermo Monroy, Farell bombed and machine-gunned the forts of Loreto, Guadalupe and San Juán, as well as enemy positions in the city of Puebla. He later moved on to attack rebels operating in the southern states of Tabasco, Oaxaca and Chiapas, where their engine failed and crashed in the dense jungle; fortunately, they were unharmed. In a lucky turn of events Farell and Monroy were rescued by Mayan natives and brought to a nearby town.

In January 1924, Farell began his duties in the north-western front against the Generals Enrique Estrada and Manuel Macario Diéguez, who controlled most of Chihuahua, Jalisco, Guanajuato, Michoacán and Durango states. Luis Farell made explorations, strafing and bombings on enemy bases in the cities of Pénjamo, Yuriria and Moroleón in the state of Guanajuato; and in Michoacán, he attacked positions in the cities of Morelia, Panindícuaro and intermediate points of opportunity. From January 14 to February 6, 1924, Luis Farell made several bombings and strafing as artilleryman of Colonel Ralph O'Neill on the state of Colima.

On February 4 of 1924, Luis Farell was promoted to Squadron Commander of the First Squadron, Second Regiment and, on February 9, 1924, he took part in the critical battle of Ocotlán, in Jalisco, a decisive and cruel battle in which Generals Joaquín Amaro and Lázaro Cárdenas lead 10,000 troops against the forces commanded by rebel General Salvador Alvarado. Since the Lerma River divided to the troops of both sides, the artillery and the Air Force were indispensable during the early hours of combat: At 07:00AM Farell's squadron flew the first of two missions, bombing and strafing the enemy until ran out of ammunition. After raising an improvised bridge, the federal forces won the battle and took several prisoners.
Three days later, the federal forces easily recovered the city of Guadalajara, where Estrada's headquarter was based, but he managed to escape to Cuba, while and Diéguez escaped to the south, where he was arrested and executed.

On February 12, 1924, Farell mounted several attacks on the state of Colima, where was still some resistance. During the campaign in the northwest, Farell served under the orders of General Salinas, Colonel Ralph O’Neill, Majors Rafael Montero Ramos, Rafael Ponce de León and Alfredo Lezama Álvarez. Some fellow fliers were men like Alfonso Cruz Rivera, Roberto Fierro Villalobos, Pablo Sidar, Emilio Carranza, Eliseo Martín del Campo, Guillermo Monroy, Manuel Solís, Julián Nava Salinas, Francisco Espejel, Alberto Vieytez, Ricardo Díaz Gonzáles and Luís Rojas, among others.

For his valuable participation against the Adolfo de la Huerta coup, General Lázaro Cardenas, who was present at his aerial attacks, promoted Luis Farell to the degree of Captain because of “special merits during battle”.

Predicting more insurrections, on January 11, 1925, Farell was assigned to take a flight instructor course and train new pilots.

During 1926 and 1927, Mexico found itself immersed in a wave of violent territorial, religious and military armed rebellions, which required the Mexican Air Force to quickly deploy its forces and provide air support wherever the federal army requested them.

== Cristero War ==
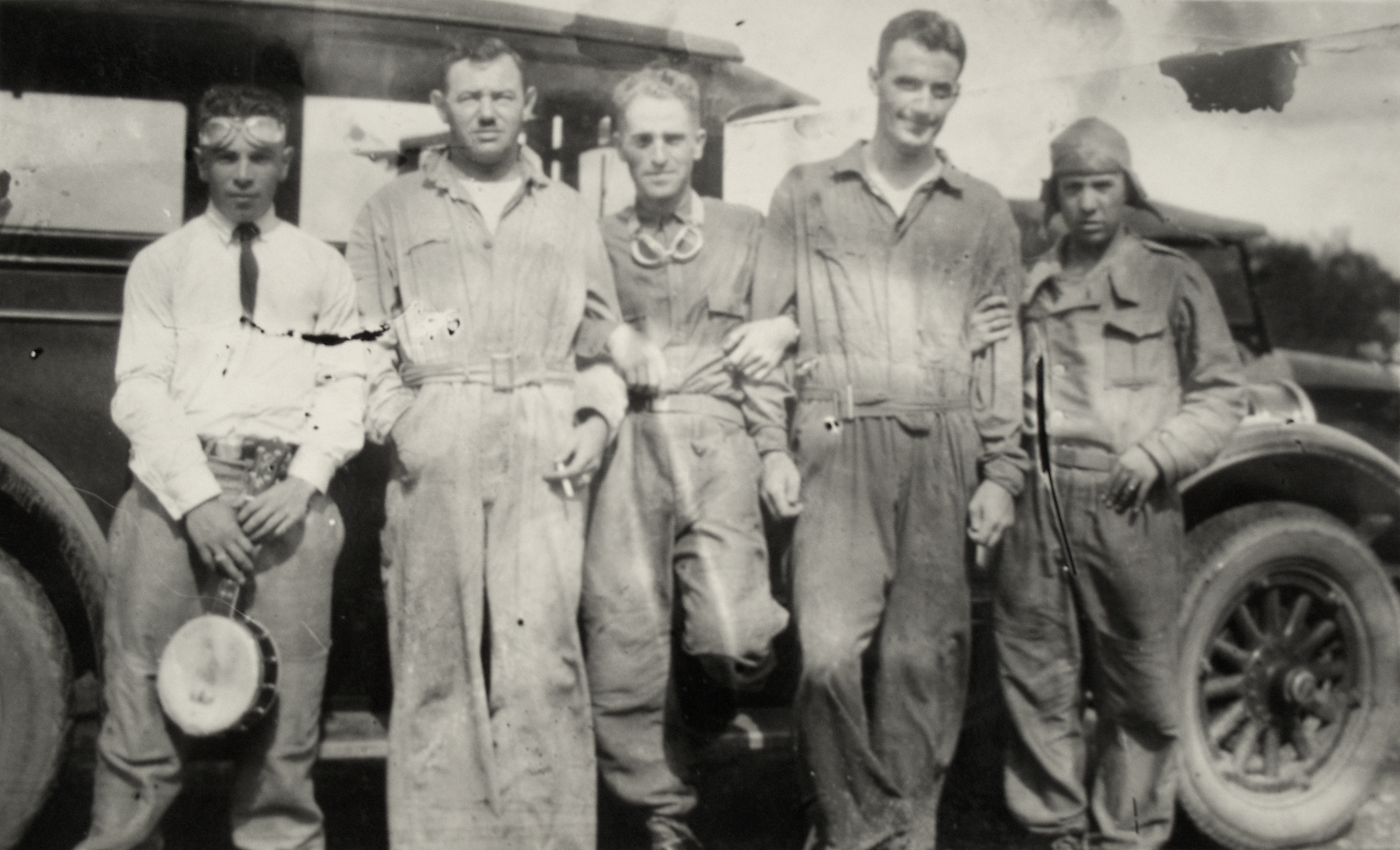
Alfredo Lezama Alvarez, Unknown pilot, Luis Farell; on the far right is Eliseo Martín del Campo. Mid-late 1920s.

When President Plutarco Elías Calles pushed for the creation of the ‘Mexican Apostolic Catholic Church’, independent of Rome, a conflict untied that, would unleash a widespread religious war known as the Cristero War. Luis Farell served in multiple missions in this war from 1926 to 1929 while flying combat missions mostly in the states of Jalisco, Guanajuato and Michoacán.

During this long conflict, Farell flew alongside his friends Alfonso Cruz Rivera, Roberto Fierro and other airmen.

== The Yaqui Campaign ==
Between 1926 and 1927 and while under the command of brigadier General Antonio Rios Zertuche, Major Roberto Fierro and Colonel Samuel Carlos Rojas, Luis Farell completed several missions against the Yaqui Indian rebels in the state of Sonora. Along with world-famous pilot Emilio Carranza, Farell flew several air-to-ground attacks over the Bacatete mountains of Sonora. It was during one of these missions that Emilio Carranza crashed and required of face reconstruction. During this campaign, Farell flew the airplanes de Havilland DH-4B # 2, 5, the Avro 504 # 59, 61, 65, 77, the Douglas O-2C # 1, 3 and the Lincoln biplane # 5.
Several years after this campaign, Farell expressed to his family the moral difficulties of having battled against these indigenous people, whom demanded by the force that previous territorial treaties were implemented.

== Rebellion by General Arnulfo Gomez ==
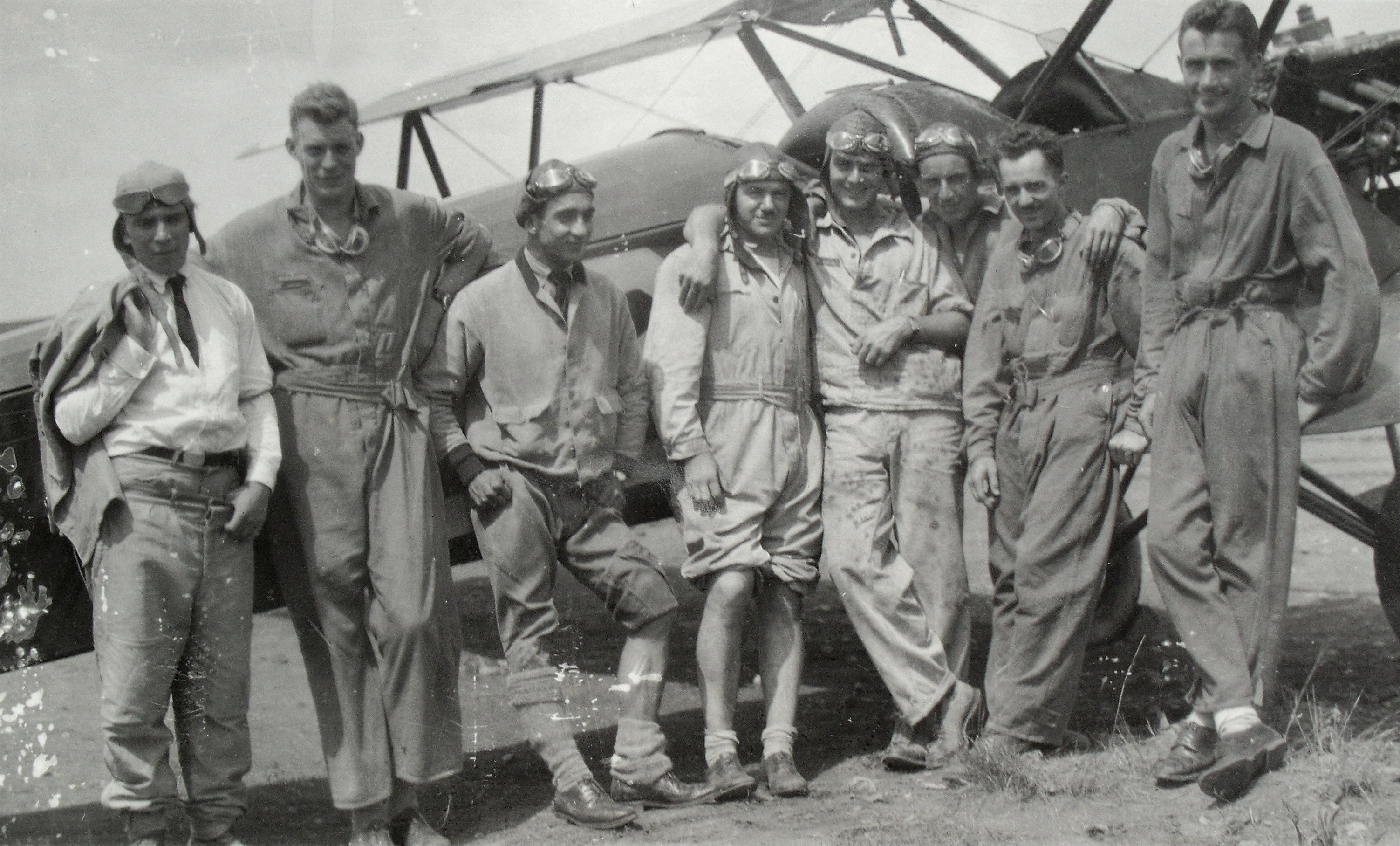
Alfredo Lezama Alvarez, Unknown, Manuel Solís; the seventh is Roberto Fierro.

In May 1927, while General Obregón seemed keen to impose the presidency for second time to General Calles, Arnulfo R. Gómez launched an armed rebellion against both Obregón and Calles, as reelection has always been unconstitutional in Mexico. His command posts were located in the cities of Puebla and Veracruz, where he brought about 2000 very well armed federal deserters.

Once the Mexican Air Force was revamped, Farell was assigned a squadron and, from October 6–11 he flew 7 consecutive missions in Veracruz, helping the army defeat Arnulfo Gomez's forces. Wasting no time, Farell's squadron was assigned to return west and renew attacks against the Cristeros in the states of Jalisco, Guanajuato and Michoacán, as the Cristeros' numbers had increased to an estimated 15,000.

== Rebellion by General José Gonzalo Escobar ==
While Farell was flight-testing a new Mexican aircraft called Baja California-1 on March 3 of 1929 a serious military coup took place, led by General José Gonzalo Escobar and heeded by various Generals. In these days, the air force's remaining airplanes consisted of worn and shot Bristol F.2 Fighter, Bristol Boarhound, de Havilland DH-4B and Douglas O-2C, a force that was not suitable to defeat Escobar's power. In this context, the government of Mexico convinced the US to promote the peace south of its border and quickly make available twelve new OU-2M Corsair with the 400 hp Wasp engine, nine Douglas O-2M, four Stearman C3B and six Waco 10. Only two weeks after making the request, the USA government agreed and Farell and other pilots travelled to Brownsville, Texas and New York City to pick up the new aircraft.

It is recorded that Luis Farell flew a total of 52 combat hours over the states of Nuevo León, Coahuila, Durango and Chihuahua, when he was wounded by a bullet. On March 19, 1929, while in company of Lieutenant Colonel Pablo Sidar, Roberto Fierro, Ismael Aduna, Luis Boyer, Arturo Jiménez Nieto, Antonio Cárdenas Rodríguez, Carlos Rovirosa, Rodolfo Torres Rico and Gustavo León, Luis Farell attacked enemy positions in Benavides, Coahuila and the following five days, from 20 - 25 of March, he bombed telegraph lines, bridges, locomotives and the railroad out of the city of Jiménez, Chihuahua in order to cut the enemy's escape and communications. Finally, on March 25, 1929, Farell's squadron attacked Escobar's operation centers in the cities of Escalon and Jiménez, and while making a low altitude strafing run with a WACO aircraft, he was shot in both legs.

The battle for the city of Jiménez was immediately reported by telegram to the President by the Lieutenant Colonel Rodolfo Tostado Loaiza, a ‘Head of Presidential Guard’ monitoring the campaign:

March 25, 1929

I have the honor to communicate to you that our war planes launched an energetic military action against the traitors that are concentrated in the city of Jiménez, bombing and machine-gunning them successfully. The panic that took place among them was enormous. The traitors were in panic, in disorder and running in all directions; they even had to open the corral doors to allow some horses to escape. The airplanes flew so low that Captain Farell, who was artilleryman of Lieutenant Colonel Fierro, received a bullet wound in both legs. Tomorrow our airplanes will return again to punish the traitors.

Lieutenant Colonel Rodolfo Tostado Loaiza
'Jefe del Estado Mayor Presidencial'.

A detailed report was made the following day and it reveals that in fact, Luis Farell piloted the airplane and the artilleryman was Captain Ismael Aduna. Farell was able to return to his base and land safely. Once the bleeding was controlled, he was flown to the Hospital Francés in Mexico City, where Erasmo González Ancira, a military physician, reported that the projectile entered his left calf, fragmented 12 cm of the fibula bone and passed only 2 cm from the femoral artery of his right thigh.

Three days after Farell was shot, Escobar was defeated by General Calles in Jiménez City, where he took about 6000 prisoners. This rebellion was quite serious, since a third of the officials and nearly 30,000 soldiers rebelled; In two months, more than 2000 men were killed.

Because of his actions in battle, on April 5 of 1929, Farell he was promoted to Major for having flown hundreds of missions and for having engaged the enemy in battle at least 50 times. In addition, the President appointed him to the Estado Mayor Presidencial, a prominent Presidential Guard staff.

A few days after leaving the hospital, on June 21. 1929, Luis Farell married Miss Ana Samaniego Castillo, and on August 12, the President presented him with a Waco model 10 biplane.

== After the Revolution ==
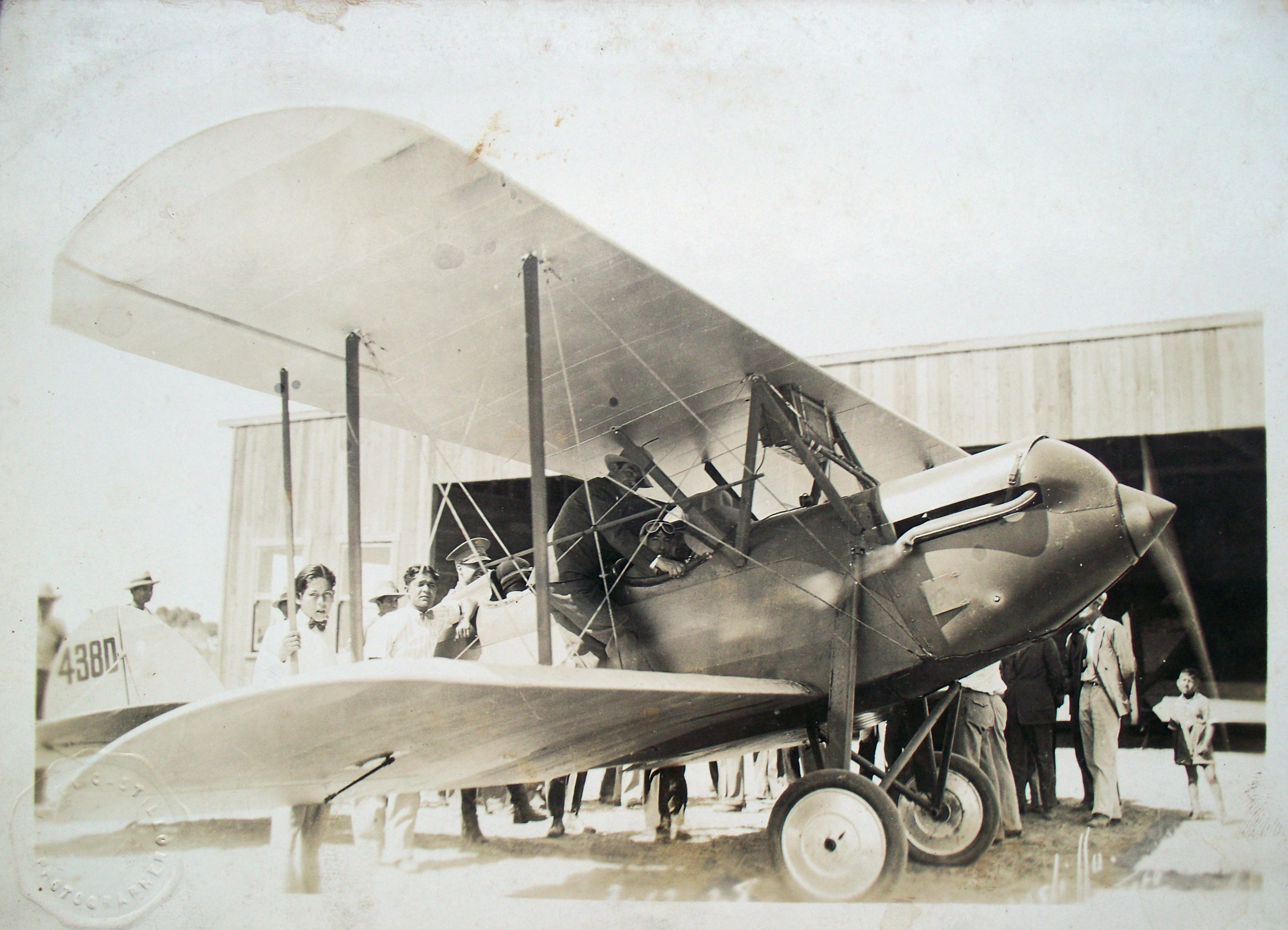
Luis Farell taking friends on a joyride on his WACO-10, a present from the President.

In 1932, Farell served in the First and Second Air Regiments flying the Chance-Vought Corsair O2U-2M, Corsair O2U-4A, Douglas O-2M and the Bristol Fighters. Then, Farell was appointed as Chief of the Civil Aviation Department and proceeded to head a committee to upgrade civil aviation policies and procedures.

On January 1, 1934, the newly elected President Lázaro Cárdenas again appointed him as 'Jefe del Estado Mayor Presidencial' and in November 1934, was promoted to Lieutenant Colonel of the Air Force.
During 1935, he was in charge of the Military Aeronautics Department and in 1936, he was appointed as Director of the Military School of Aviation, a charge that he performed until October 1945.

In May 1938, the Governor of San Luis Potosi, General Saturnino Cedillo, declared himself in rebellion against Cardenas’ government and, President Cárdenas travelled to San Luis Potosi to personally mount the campaign against the revolt.

Luis Farell and an old friend, Coronel Alfredo Lezama Álvarez, organized a mixed fleet of 17 aircraft and flew several missions, engaging the enemy assertively when spotted. Cedillo quickly realized he had no chance in open fields against the air force and ran to the Huasteca hills, where his men dispersed abandoning him.

During this confrontation, Farell flew the new V-99M Corsairs which had the capacity to carry bombs and were equipped with the 550 hp Pratt & Whitney R-1340-T1H-1 Wasp engine and two Colt 0.30 machine guns, one fixed at the front and one for the artilleryman. He also flew the Fleet 21-M biplanes.
Cedillo was shot by ground federal forces in 1939.

During World War II, Mexico received a large number of aircraft to patrol the Gulf of Mexico coast against German submarines and Luis Farell coordinated the pilot training. Farell also formed part in the officials' selection to comprise the Mexican Escuadron 201 which saw action in Philippines during 1945.

Farell was promoted to colonel in January 1939 and to brigadier general in February 1944. In 1946, he was assigned to direct the Military Personnel Department. In 1955, Farell was awarded the "Cruz de Guerra" medal along with fellow pilots Gustavo León González, Alfonso Cruz Rivera and David J. Borja Guajardo.

In 1959, Guatemala President Miguel Ydígoras Fuentes ordered his P-51 Mustangs to attack five Mexican fishing vessels in contested waters. Soon after that incident, Roberto Fierro and Luis Farell were appointed Chief and Sub-Chief of the Mexican Air Force, respectively. At this time, Mexico had no natural enemies and was dedicated to industrial growth, not to a military buildup. The conflict was resolved with diplomacy. Farell and Fierro concluded that the Mexican Air Force could not confront the powerful P-51 Mustang aircraft if required again, so they purchased a Canadian fleet of Vampire MK-3 jets made available by the US, and Lockheed T-33 jets from the USA. Farell applied himself at establishing a system that would never leave Mexico in such vulnerable position again — a difficult task given the limited budget available.

Farell retired from active service in August 1965 with the rank of division general. He died in Mexico City on July 17, 1977, at age of 74. He left behind his wife Ana and four sons: Jaime, Guillermo, Bernardo and Luis.
