= Guillermo Mercado Romero =

Mexican politician (born 1938)

Governor of Baja California Sur
- In office April 5, 1993 – April 4, 1999
- Preceded by: Víctor Manuel Liceaga Ruibal
- Succeeded by: Leonel Cota Montaño

Personal details
- Born: 1 March 1938 (age 88) La Paz, Baja California Sur, Mexico
- Party: PRI
- Spouse: María Concepción Casas
- Education: University of Guadalajara
- Occupation: politician

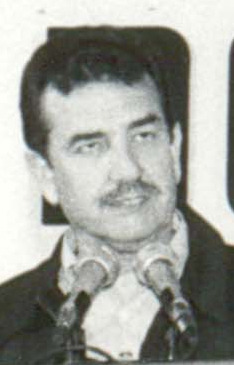
Guillermo Mercado Romero

Guillermo Mercado Romero (born 1 March 1938) is a Mexican politician who served as the Governor of Baja California Sur from 1993 to 1999. He is a member of the Institutional Revolutionary Party (PRI). He also served in the Senate and the Chamber of Deputies.

== Corruption charges ==
Mercado left office in 1999. In early 2001, Mercado and eighteen other former Mexican government officials were charged with diverting approximately $55 million in public funding. Mercado was indicted for two charges: Mercado's gubernatorial administration was accused of purchasing airline tickets for official government travel through a travel agency owned by his wife and daughter. Second, Mercado was also charged with improperly transferring ownership of public land to a private research institute during his tenure as governor.

Mercado's wife, Maria Concepcion Casas de Mercado, owned a condo in San Diego, California, which she sold in January 2001 for $330,000. She then purchased a new home in El Cajon, California, in February 2001, just one month later, for $188,000. In June 2001, U.S. immigration agents questioned Mercado at his home in El Cajon to determine his legal status. Mercado showed the investigators a valid pilot's license and Social Security card as proof that he was in the United States legally. Mercado also had a visa, which allows Mexicans living near the U.S. border to travel up to 25 miles inside the U.S. for up to three days.
