= Genaro Borrego Estrada =

Mexican politician

Governor of Zacatecas
- In office 12 September 1986 – 14 May 1992
- Preceded by: José Guadalupe Cervantes Corona
- Succeeded by: Pedro de León

President of the Institutional Revolutionary Party
- In office 14 May 1992 – 30 March 1993
- Preceded by: Rafael Rodríguez Barrera
- Succeeded by: Fernando Ortiz Arana

Head of the Mexican Social Security Institute
- In office 1993–2000
- Preceded by: Emilio Gamboa Patrón
- Succeeded by: Mario Luis Fuentes Alcalá

Personal details
- Born: 18 February 1949 (age 77) Zacatecas, Zacatecas, Mexico
- Party: PRI
- Website: http://www.genaroborregoestrada.mx/

Genaro Borrego Estrada (born 18 February 1949) is a Mexican politician affiliated with the Institutional Revolutionary Party (PRI) who served as Governor of Zacatecas between 1986 and 1992 and as Head of the Mexican Social Security Institute (IMSS) during the government of Ernesto Zedillo. He also served as a senator for Zacatecas during the 58th and 59th sessions of Congress and as a deputy for the first district of Zacatecas during the 52nd session.

Preceded by José Guadalupe Cervantes Corona	Governor of Zacatecas; 1986 — 1992	Succeeded by Pedro de León

Preceded by Rafael Rodríguez Barrera	President of the Institutional Revolutionary Party; 1992 — 1993	Succeeded by Fernando Ortiz Arana
