= José Ramírez Gamero =

Mexican politician (1938–2022)

José Ramírez Gamero (12 June 1938 – 7 July 2022) was a Mexican politician, member of Institutional Revolutionary Party, who was Governor of Durango from 1986 to 1992.

Jose Ramirez Gamero was son of Antonio Ramirez, leader of the Workers Federation of the State of Durango until his death, like his father, Ramirez Gamero made his political trajectory within the Confederation of Mexican Workers (CTM). From 1976 to 1979 he represented Federal electoral district's L and IV Legislature of Durango and from 2000 to 2003 represented LVIII Legislature. He was elected twice as Senator and twice represented Durango from 1982 to 1988 and from 1997 to 2000.

He was in addition member to the National Executive Committee of the CTM, where he occupied several secretariats.

Preceded by Armando del Castillo Franco	Governor of Durango; 1986–1992	Succeeded by Maximiliano Silerio
