= Ulises Schmill Ordóñez =

Mexican judge (1937–2026)

President of the Supreme Court of Mexico
- In office 2 January 1991 – 31 December 1994
- Preceded by: Carlos Antonio del Río Rodríguez
- Succeeded by: José Vicente Aguinaco Alemán

Minister of the Supreme Court of Mexico
- In office 18 April 1985 – 31 December 1994
- Preceded by: Eduardo Langle Martínez

Personal details
- Born: Ulises Sergio Schmill Ordóñez; 4 April 1937 Mexico City, Mexico
- Died: 18 May 2026 (aged 89)
- Education: National Autonomous University of Mexico (LLB, LLD)
- Occupation: Judge

Ulises Sergio Schmill Ordóñez (Note: In this Mexican name, the surname is Schmill and the second or maternal family name is Ordóñez.) (4 April 1937 – 18 May 2026) was a Mexican judge. He served as a minister of the Supreme Court from 1985 to 1994 and was its president from 1991 to 1994.

== Life and career ==
Ulises Schmill Ordóñez was born in Mexico City on 4 April 1937. He graduated with a law degree from the National Autonomous University of Mexico (UNAM) in 1959 with a thesis on the problems of sovereignty and earned a doctorate in law from the same university in 1962. He later lectured at the UNAM's School of Law and was a researcher at its legal research institute.

Schmill served as ambassador to Austria in 1973–1975, ambassador to Hungary in 1975, and ambassador to West Germany in 1976–1977.

He was nominated for a seat on the Supreme Court by President Miguel de la Madrid on 18 April 1985 and served on the bench until 31 December 1994. He took office as the court's president on 2 January 1999 and served in that capacity until the end of his term on the court, when President Ernesto Zedillo's reforms of the Supreme Court reduced the number of justices from 26 to 11.

Schmill died on 18 May 2026, at the age of 89.
