= Manuel Gurría Ordóñez =

Mexican politician (1931–2026)

108th Governor of Tabasco
- In office 28 January 1992 – 31 December 1994
- Preceded by: Salvador Neme Castillo
- Succeeded by: Roberto Madrazo

Member of the Senate of the Republic of Mexico for Tabasco
- In office 1 November 1991 – 28 January 1992
- Preceded by: Roberto Madrazo
- Succeeded by: Alberto Camarena López

Member of the Chamber of Deputies of Mexico
- In office 1 September 1985 – 31 August 1988
- Preceded by: Pedro Luis Bartilotti Perea
- Succeeded by: Jaime Guillermo Aviña Zepeda
- Constituency: 1st federal electoral district of the Federal District
- In office 1 September 1964 – 31 August 1967
- Preceded by: Manuel Rafael Mora Martínez
- Succeeded by: Mario Trujillo García
- Constituency: 1st federal electoral district of Tabasco

Personal details
- Born: 31 October 1931 Villahermosa, Tabasco, Mexico
- Died: 11 April 2026 (aged 94)
- Party: PRI
- Occupation: Lawyer

Manuel Gurría Ordóñez (Note: In this Mexican name, the surname is Gurría and the second or maternal family name is Ordóñez.) (31 October 1931 – 11 April 2026) was a Mexican politician affiliated with the Institutional Revolutionary Party (PRI). A native of the state of Tabasco, he served in the Chamber of Deputies from 1964 to 1967 (Tabasco's 1st) and from 1985 to 1988 (Federal District's 1st). He was a Senator for Tabasco from 1991 to 1992 and served as governor of Tabasco from 1992 to 1994, completing the term of Salvador Neme Castillo.

Gurría died on 11 April 2026, at the age of 94.
