= Rafael Corrales Ayala =

Mexican lawyer and politician

Governor of Guanajuato
- In office 26 September 1985 – 25 September 1991
- Preceded by: Agustín Téllez Cruces
- Succeeded by: Carlos Medina Plascencia

Personal details
- Born: 14 September 1925 Guanajuato, Guanajuato, Mexico
- Died: 27 January 2015 (aged 89) Mexico City, Mexico
- Party: Institutional Revolutionary Party
- Profession: Lawyer

Rafael Corrales Ayala Espinoza (14 September 1925 – 27 January 2015) was a Mexican lawyer and politician from the Institutional Revolutionary Party (PRI) who served as governor of Guanajuato from 1985 to 1991.

Prior to his election as governor, he served three terms in the Chamber of Deputies for Guanajuato's 1st district: 1949–1952 (41st Congress), 1955–1958 (43rd Congress), and 1979–1982 (51st Congress). He was the President of the Chamber of Deputies in 1956. From 1964 to 1970, he was also the general manager of the National Lottery.

He died in Mexico City on 27 January 2015.

Preceded by Agustín Téllez Cruces	Governor of Guanajuato; 1985–1991	Succeeded by Carlos Medina Plascencia
