= Patricio Chirinos Calero =

Mexican politician (born 1937

Governor of Veracruz
- In office 1 December 1992 – 30 November 1998
- Preceded by: Dante Delgado Rannauro
- Succeeded by: Miguel Alemán Velasco

Secretary of Urban Development and Ecology
- In office 1988–1992
- Preceded by: Gabino Fraga Mouret
- Succeeded by: Luis Donaldo Colosio Murrieta

Federal deputy for Veracruz's 4th
- In office 1973–1976
- Preceded by: Mario Malpica Bernabé
- Succeeded by: Manuel Gutiérrez Zamora Zamudio

Personal details
- Born: 17 July 1937 (age 89) Pánuco, Veracruz, Mexico
- Party: PRI
- Education: UNAM
- Occupation: Politician
- Profession: Economist

Patricio Chirinos Calero (Note: In this Mexican name, the surname is Chirinos and the second or maternal family name is Calero.) (born 27 July 1937) is a Mexican politician affiliated with the Institutional Revolutionary Party (PRI). He has served in Congress and in the federal cabinet and was governor of Veracruz from 1992 to 1998.

== Life and career ==
Patricio Chirinos Calero was born in Pánuco, Veracruz, on 27 July 1937. (Note: Allegations claim that he was born in Tamuín, San Luis Potosí, and was therefore ineligible to serve as governor of Veracruz.) He joined the PRI in 1962 and earned a degree in economics from the National Autonomous University of Mexico (UNAM) in 1964 with a thesis titled "Economic Development and Social Change". He later taught at the UNAM's School for Foreigners (CEPE).

In the 1973 mid-terms, he was elected to the Chamber of Deputies to represent Veracruz's 4th district. In 1988, incoming president Carlos Salinas de Gortari selected him to serve as secretary of urban development and ecology in his cabinet.

On 2 August 1992, representing the PRI, he won the Veracruz gubernatorial election with a 74% share of the popular vote, defeating Heberto Castillo of the newly formed Party of the Democratic Revolution (PRD). He served a six-year term as governor from 1 December 1992 to 30 November 1998.

After the end of his term as governor, Chirinos withdrew from public life.

== Family ==
Chirinos's parents were Antonio Chirinos Gea, who served several terms as municipal president of Pánuco, and Catalina Calero Valdez. He has been married twice.
