= Sócrates Rizzo =

Mexican politician (born 1945)

Sócrates Cuauhtémoc Rizzo García (born September 14, 1945) is a Mexican politician affiliated with the Institutional Revolutionary Party (PRI). He is a former federal Congressman (1985–1989), mayor of Monterrey (1989–1991) and former governor of Nuevo León (1991 – 1996).

Born in Linares, Nuevo León, he graduated from the Autonomous University of Nuevo León in 1969 with a bachelor's degree in economics and received master's degrees in the same discipline at El Colegio de México and at the University of Chicago.

He worked several years at the Secretariat of Finance and Public Credit and was elected to the Chamber of Deputies in 1985, for the 38th district of the Federal District. After briefly chairing the state branch of the Institutional Revolutionary Party in Nuevo León (1988) he was elected mayor of Monterrey. He left the post to run for governor of the state and after a clear victory over his closest opponent he took office in 1991. As governor, Rizzo built the second line of Metrorrey and the state's largest water reservoir. He resigned from the post on April 18, 1996, after several political scandals involving some of his closest cabinet members.

After his resignation, Rizzo worked as visitor at Harvard and Duke. He also researched municipal decentralization for the government of Honduras.

Preceded by Jorge Treviño	Governor of Nuevo León; 1991 — 1996	Succeeded by Benjamín Clariond
