= Silvia Hernández Enríquez =

Mexican politician

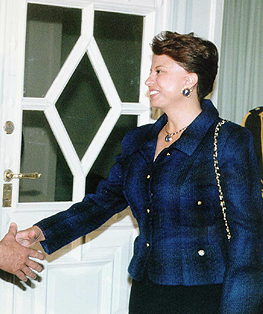
.Silvia Hernandez shaking hands with a government official Mrs. Buenos Aires(cropped out).

Silvia Hernández Enríquez (born 12 September 1948) is a Mexican politician affiliated with the Institutional Revolutionary Party (PRI) who served as Secretary of Tourism from December 1994 to December 1997.

== Political career ==
Born in Querétaro City, Hernández earned her undergraduate degree in political science and public administration at the National Autonomous University of Mexico in 1973 before earning her master's degree in public administration at the London School of Economics. Hernández, an active PRI member, has served in different positions within her party. In the early 1990s she was the leader of the PRI's National Confederation of Popular Organizations (CNOP).

She has a long career in the Mexican Congress serving as deputy in the lower house of the Congress and serving in the Mexican Senate three times. In 1994 President Ernesto Zedillo Ponce de León appointed her as Secretary of Tourism. In 2002 she served as Chairperson of the Inter-Parliamentary Forum of the Americas.

She has unsuccessfully tried to obtain her party's candidacy for the governorship of Querétaro.

Preceded by Jesús Silva Herzog	Secretary of Tourism; 1994–1997	Succeeded by Oscar Espinosa Villarreal
