= Emilio Gamboa Patrón =

Mexican politician

Emilio Antonio Gamboa
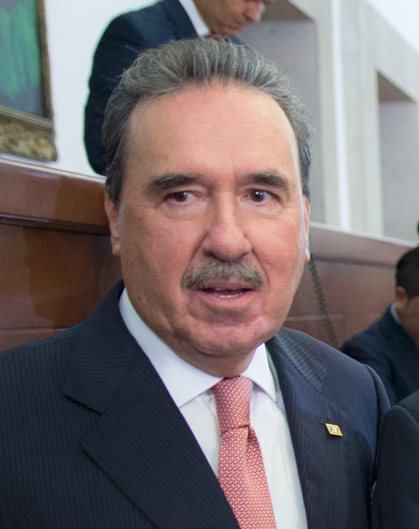
- Born: 23 August 1950 (age 76); Mexico City, Mexico
- Education: Universidad Iberoamericana
- Occupation: Senator
- Political party: PRI
- Children: Pablo Gamboa Miner

Emilio Antonio Gamboa Patrón (born 23 August 1950) is a Mexican politician affiliated with the PRI. He was Senator during the 2000–2003 and 2003–2006 Legislatures and deputy during the LX Legislature and the LXII Legislature of the Mexican Congress during 2012-2015 and LXIII Legislature, 2015-2018.
