= Patrocinio González Garrido =

Mexican politician (1934–2021)

Secretary of the Interior
- In office 4 January 1993 – 10 January 1994

Governor of Chiapas
- In office 8 December 1988 – 4 January 1993

Senator for Chiapas
- In office 1982–1988

Member of the Chamber of Deputies
- In office 1967–1970
- Constituency: 6th district of Chiapas

Personal details
- Born: 8 May 1934 Catazajá, Chiapas, Mexico
- Died: 30 November 2021 (aged 87) Cancún, Quintana Roo, Mexico
- Party: PRI

José Patrocinio González Blanco Garrido (18 May 1934 – 30 November 2021) was a Mexican politician affiliated with the Institutional Revolutionary Party (PRI). He served in both houses of Congress, as governor of Chiapas and as secretary of the interior. He resigned as interior secretary in the aftermath of the 1994 Zapatista uprising.

== Career ==
Patrocinio González Garrido was born in Catazajá, Chiapas, in 1934. In 1952, as a student in Mexico City, he decided to support Adolfo Ruiz Cortines's presidential bid and subsequently joined the PRI. He graduated with a law degree from the National Autonomous University of Mexico (UNAM) in 1956 and went on to complete a master's at Trinity Hall, Cambridge.

During the early 1960s, he held positions in the Secretariat of Communications and Public Works (SCOP), the Secretariat of Finance and Public Credit (SHCP), the Institute for Social Security and Services for State Workers (ISSSTE) and the National Lottery.

In the 1967 mid-term election, he was elected to a three-year term in the Chamber of Deputies for the 6th district of Chiapas and, in 1982 he was elected to the Senate for his home state. In 1988 he ran for governor of Chiapas. He won the election, held concurrently with the general election on 6 July, with 89% of the vote on a 50% turnout and was sworn in on 8 December.

González Garrido resigned as governor after four years when, on 4 January 1993, President Carlos Salinas de Gortari (Note: Salinas de Gortari was a cousin of González Garrido's wife, Patricia.) appointed him secretary of the interior, replacing Fernando Gutiérrez Barrios. He served in that position until 10 January 1994, when he resigned (or was dismissed) following the uprising of the Zapatista National Liberation Army (EZLN) that had begun on 1 January. He was replaced by Jorge Carpizo. González Garrido withdrew from political life as a consequence and, in later years, established a zoo, Ecoparque Aluxes, in Palenque, Chiapas.

On 23 December 2020, at the age of 86, he resigned his membership in the PRI, in protest at the party's plan to fight the 2021 mid-terms in coalition with the National Action Party (PAN) and the Party of the Democratic Revolution (PRD). "Ideals must be above electoral aspirations," he said in a letter to the PRI's president, Alejandro Moreno.

Patrocinio González Garrido died of cancer in Cancún, Quintana Roo, less than a year later, on 30 November 2021.

== Family ==
González Garrido's maternal grandfather, Tomás Garrido Canabal, served as governor of Tabasco and interim governor of Yucatán. His father, Salomón González Blanco, was a Supreme Court justice, served 12 years as Secretary of Labour and Social Welfare and was governor of Chiapas in 1977–1979.

In 1960, González Garrido married Patricia Ortiz Mena Salinas, the daughter of Antonio Ortiz Mena, with whom he had four children. Their youngest, Josefa González Blanco Ortiz Mena, served briefly as secretary of the environment (2018–2019) and, in 2021, was appointed ambassador to the United Kingdom.
