= Víctor Manuel Liceaga Ruibal =

Mexican politician

Governor of Baja California Sur
- In office April 5, 1987 – April 4, 1993
- Preceded by: Alberto Andrés Alvarado Arámburo
- Succeeded by: Guillermo Mercado Romero

Personal details
- Born: February 11, 1935 La Paz, Baja California Sur, Mexico
- Died: February 13, 2012 (aged 77) Cabo San Lucas, Baja California Sur, Mexico
- Party: Institutional Revolutionary Party

Víctor Manuel Liceaga Ruibal (February 11, 1935 – February 13, 2012) was a Mexican politician. Liceaga Ruibal served as the Governor of Baja California Sur from 1987 to 1993. He was a member of the Institutional Revolutionary Party (PRI).

Liceaga Ruibal was born in La Paz, Baja California Sur, on February 11, 1935.

Liceaga Ruibal began his career in the civil service. He served in both the federal Chamber of Deputies and the Senate (from 1977 to 1982), representing Baja California Sur. He was also the former head of the Institutional Revolutionary Party in Baja California Sur.

Liceaga Ruibal served as a government delegate for Iztapalapa, Mexico City during the early days of the Miguel de la Madrid administration. Liceaga Ruibal lost his left arm in a plane crash in Colima. Additionally, he held posts as a PRI delegate for the party's national executive committee in several Mexican states, including Tabasco. He was a special representative of the PRI's executive committee during the 2006 Mexican presidential election.

Liceaga Ruibal died from respiratory failure in Cabo San Lucas on February 13, 2012, at the age of 77. He had been visiting his sister in Cabo San Lucas at the time. His funeral was held in La Paz.
