= Dante Delgado Rannauro =

Mexican politician

Dante Delgado
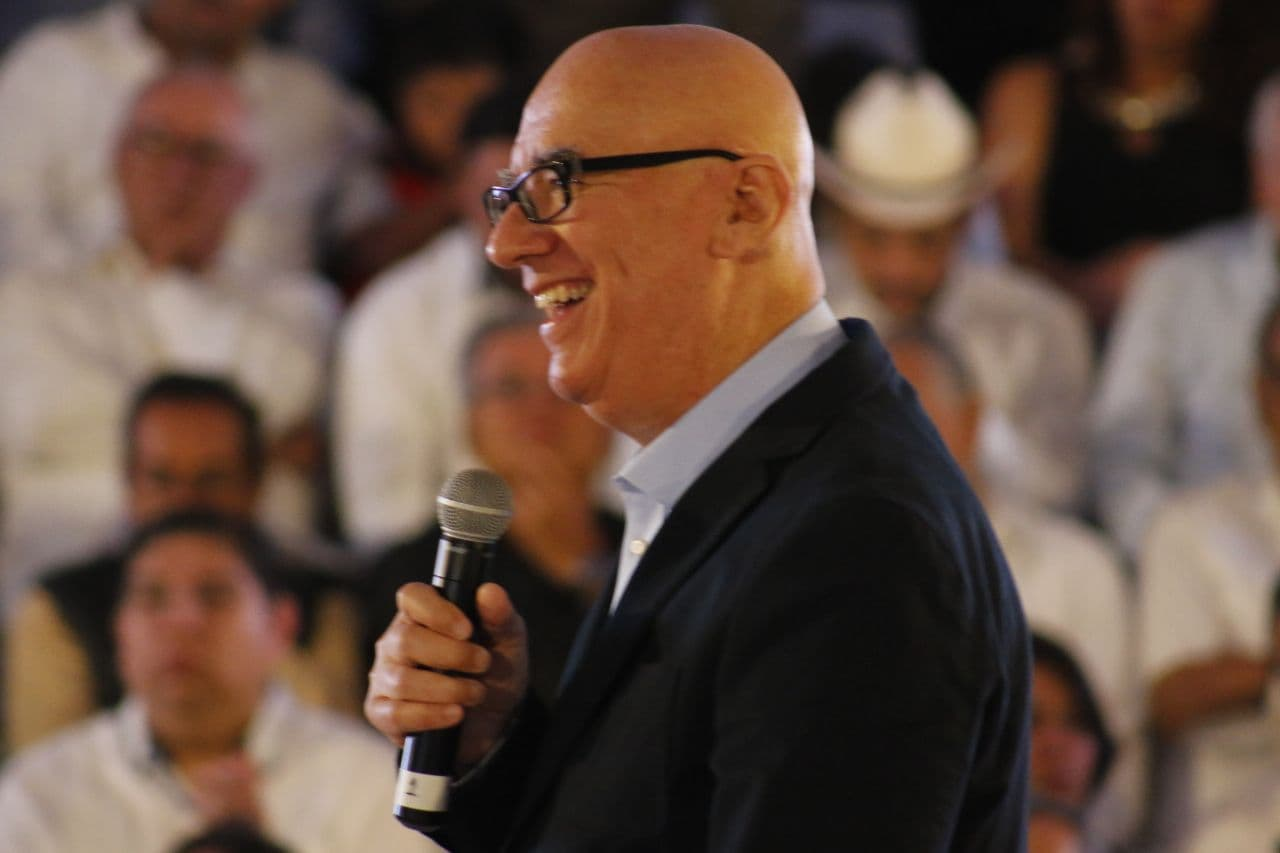
- Delgado Rannauro at a political rally in 2021

Plurinominal Senator in the 64th and 65th sessions of the Congress of the Union
- Incumbent
- Assumed office 1 September 2018

Interim Governor of Veracruz
- In office 1 December 1988 – 30 November 1992
- Preceded by: Fernando Gutiérrez Barrios
- Succeeded by: Patricio Chirinos Calero

Senator in the 60th and 61st sessions of the Congress of the Union for Veracruz
- In office 1 September 2006 – 31 August 2012

Mexico Ambassador to Italy
- In office 19 March 1993 – 12 June 1994
- President: Carlos Salinas de Gortari
- Preceded by: Francisco Javier Alejo
- Succeeded by: Mario Moya Palencia

Member of the Chamber of Deputies for the 10th district of Veracruz
- In office 1 September 1985 – 31 August 1988
- Preceded by: Jorge Minvielle Porte Petit
- Succeeded by: Adalberto Díaz Jacome

Personal details
- Born: Dante Alfonso Delgado Rannauro; 23 December 1950 (age 75) Alvarado, Veracruz, Mexico
- Party: Citizens' Movement (1999–present)
- Other political affiliations: Institutional Revolutionary Party (1968-1995)
- Education: Universidad Veracruzana
- Occupation: Lawyer; Politician
- Website: dantedelgado.org.mx

Dante Alfonso Delgado Rannauro (born 23 December 1950) is a Mexican politician, lawyer, and diplomat who is the national coordinator and co-founder of the Citizens' Movement political party.

He served as interim governor of Veracruz from 1988 to 1992; as ambassador of Mexico to Italy (1993–1994); as a senator during the 60th and 61st sessions of Congress (2006–2012), representing Veracruz for Convergencia; and as a deputy during the 53rd session (1985–1988), representing Veracruz's tenth district for the Institutional Revolutionary Party (PRI).

In the 2018 general election he was re-elected to the Senate as a senator-at-large for a six-year term from the Citizens' Movement's national list.

Preceded by Fernando Gutiérrez Barrios	Interim; Governor of Veracruz; 1988–1992	Succeeded by Patricio Chirinos Calero
