= Carlos de la Madrid Virgen =

Mexican politician and lawyer

Governor of Colima
- In office 1 November 1991 – 31 October 1997
- Preceded by: Elías Zamora Verduzco
- Succeeded by: Fernando Moreno Peña

Personal details
- Born: 24 May 1940 Colima, Colima, Mexico
- Died: 26 August 2014 (aged 74)
- Party: PRI
- Profession: Lawyer

Carlos de la Madrid Virgen (24 May 1940 – 26 August 2014) was a Mexican lawyer and politician affiliated with the Institutional Revolutionary Party, he was Governor of Colima from 1991 to 1997 and also served as Mayor of Colima, Colima until 1991, when he was appointed to the Governature.
