= Heladio Ramírez =

Mexican politician

- Born: 11 May 1939 (age 87); Huajuapan de León, Oaxaca, Mexico
- Occupation: Politician
- Political party: PRI

Heladio Elías Ramírez López (born 11 May 1939) is a Mexican politician affiliated with the Institutional Revolutionary Party (PRI). He was born in Huajuapan, Oaxaca.

In the 2012 general election Ramírez López was elected to the Senate for the 60th and 61st sessions of Congress as a proportional representation senator. He also served in the Chamber of Deputies during the 1976–79 period, representing the sixth district of Oaxaca, and as the Governor of Oaxaca from 1986 to 1992.

He was the President of the Chamber of Deputies in 1976.
