= Carlos Medina Plascencia =

Mexican senator and Governor of Guanajuato

President of the Chamber of Deputies
- In office 1 September 1999 – 30 September 1999
- Preceded by: Victorio Montalvo Rojas
- Succeeded by: Francisco José Paoli Bolio

Governor of Guanajuato
- In office 3 November 1991 – 25 June 1995
- Preceded by: Rafael Corrales Ayala
- Succeeded by: Vicente Fox

Personal details
- Born: 14 August 1955 (age 71) León, Guanajuato, Mexico
- Party: National Action Party
- Other political affiliations: Somos México
- Spouse: Martha Padilla Vega (m. 1977)
- Occupation: Politician and academic

Carlos Medina Plascencia (born 14 August 1955 in León, Guanajuato) is a Mexican politician affiliated with the conservative National Action Party (PAN). He is a former mayor of León, senator and interim governor of Guanajuato (1991 – 1995). He was the President of the Chamber of Deputies in 1999. In 2005 he ran for president of the PAN but lost against Manuel Espino.

He is the son of Carlos Medina Torres and María del Carmen Plascencia Fonseca. He graduated with a bachelor's degree in chemical engineering and a master's degree in business administration from the Monterrey Institute of Technology and Higher Studies (ITESM), where he worked as a professor from 1980 to 1981. In 1985, he joined the National Action Party and a year later was elected city councilor of León. Three years later he won the mayorship of the municipality.

== See also ==
- List of Monterrey Institute of Technology and Higher Education faculty
- List of mayors of León, Mexico

== Bibliography ==
- Diccionario biográfico del gobierno mexicano, Ed. Fondo de Cultura Económica, Mexico, 1992.

Preceded by Rafael Corrales Ayala	Governor of Guanajuato interim 1991–1995	Succeeded by Vicente Fox
