= Guillermo Cosío Vidaurri =

Mexican diplomat and politician (1929–2019)

Guillermo Cosío Vidaurri (born in Guadalajara, Jalisco, Mexico; September 4, 1929 – November 13, 2019) was a Mexican diplomat and politician who served as municipal president of Guadalajara (1971–1973), governor of Jalisco and in the Chamber of Deputies for Jalisco's 1st district (1976–1979). He also served as Ambassador of Mexico to Guatemala.
