= Fernando Solana =

Mexican politician

President of the Senate
- In office 1 November 1997 – 30 November 1997
- Preceded by: María de los Ángeles Moreno
- Succeeded by: Heladio Ramírez

Senator for the Federal District
- In office 1 November 1994 – 31 August 2000
- Preceded by: Porfirio Muñoz Ledo
- Succeeded by: Jesús Galván Muñoz

Secretary of Public Education
- In office 29 November 1993 – 11 May 1994
- President: Carlos Salinas de Gortari
- Preceded by: Ernesto Zedillo
- Succeeded by: José Ángel Pescador Osuna
- In office 9 December 1977 – 30 November 1982
- President: José López Portillo
- Preceded by: Porfirio Muñoz Ledo
- Succeeded by: Jesús Reyes Heroles

Secretary of Foreign Affairs
- In office 1 December 1988 – 29 November 1993
- President: Carlos Salinas de Gortari
- Preceded by: Bernardo Sepúlveda Amor
- Succeeded by: Manuel Camacho Solís

Secretary of Commerce
- In office 1 December 1976 – 9 December 1977
- President: José López Portillo
- Preceded by: José Campillo Sainz
- Succeeded by: Jorge de la Vega Domínguez

Personal details
- Born: 8 February 1931 Mexico City, Mexico
- Died: 23 March 2016 (aged 85) Mexico City, Mexico
- Party: Institutional Revolutionary
- Education: National Autonomous University of Mexico

Fernando Solana Morales (8 February 1931 – 23 March 2016) was a Mexican diplomat, politician and businessman. He served as the Secretary of Public Education, of Commerce and of Foreign Affairs.

== Biography ==
Born in Mexico City, Fernando Solana graduated from the National Autonomous University of Mexico, where has been a professor in economics, Philosophy, and Political Sciences. He has also served as Secretary General of the university.

He began his public service career after he was appointed as Secretary of Commerce by president José López Portillo in 1976. Less than one year later, he was appointed Secretary of Education, a position that he retained to the end of the López Portillo administration in 1982. That same year, the new president Miguel de la Madrid named him General Director of BANAMEX, the largest private bank in Mexico that had just been nationalized by the previous government, he remained in this charge until 1988 when Carlos Salinas de Gortari named him as Secretary of Foreign Affairs. From 1994 to 2000 he was senator representing the Federal District and chair the senatorial commission on International Affairs. Today he chairs the board of the Mexican Council on Foreign Affairs a non governmental organization, with some 500 independent members that include businessmen, diplomats, professors and people link with the international activities of Mexico. He is also member of the board of some of the largest Mexican corporations, the Institute of the Americas in California, the Mexican American Foundation for Science, Euro America Foundation in Madrid, Canning House in London and president of Solana Consultores, a business consultancy firm.

Political offices
Preceded by Ernesto Zedillo	Secretary of Education; 1993–1994	Succeeded by José Ángel Pescador
Preceded by Bernardo Sepúlveda Amor	Secretary of Foreign Affairs; 1988–1993	Succeeded by Manuel Camacho Solís
Preceded by Porfirio Muñoz Ledo	Secretary of Education; 1977–1982	Succeeded by Jesús Reyes Heroles
Preceded by José Campillo Sáinz	Secretary of Commerce; 1976–1977	Succeeded by Jorge de la Vega Domínguez
