= Miguel Borge Martín =

Mexican politician

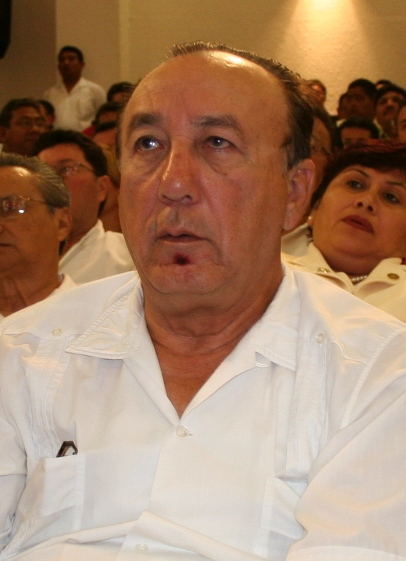

3rd Governor of Quintana Roo
- In office April 5, 1987 – April 4, 1993
- Preceded by: Pedro Joaquín Coldwell
- Succeeded by: Mario Villanueva Madrid

Personal details
- Born: 30 October 1943 (age 82) Cozumel, Quintana Roo
- Party: Institutional Revolutionary Party
- Spouse: Rosalía Jannetti
- Profession: Lawyer; Economist

Miguel Borge Martín (born 30 October 1943 in Cozumel, Quintana Roo) is a Mexican politician member of the Institutional Revolutionary Party (PRI). Between 1987 and 1993 he served as governor of the state of Quintana Roo. Prior to his election as governor, he held a seat in the Senate, representing his home state.

His term in office was notable for the devastating landfall of Hurricane Gilbert on the Quintana Roo coast on 14 September 1988.

Preceded by Pedro Joaquín Coldwell	Governor of Quintana Roo; 5 April 1987 to 4 April 1993	Succeeded by Mario Villanueva Madrid
