= Mariano Piña Olaya =

Mexican politician

Governor of Puebla
- In office 1 February 1987 – 31 January 1993
- Preceded by: Guillermo Jiménez Morales
- Succeeded by: Manuel Bartlett Díaz

President of the Chamber of Deputies
- In office 1 December 1982 – 31 August 1983
- Preceded by: Mario Vargas Saldaña
- Succeeded by: Irma Cué de Duarte

Member of the Chamber of Deputies for Puebla's 10th district
- In office 1 September 1982 – 31 August 1985
- Preceded by: Alfonso Zegbe Sanen
- Succeeded by: Carlos Palafox Vázquez

Personal details
- Born: 29 March 1933 (age 92); Champusco, Puebla, Mexico
- Political party: PRI
- Education: UNAM

Mariano Piña Olaya (born 29 March 1933) is a Mexican politician who served as the governor of Puebla from 1987 to 1993.

== Career ==
Piña Olaya was born Champusco, Puebla, in 1933. He studied law at the National Autonomous University of Mexico (UNAM). As a member of the Institutional Revolutionary Party (PRI), he served in the Chamber of Deputies to represent Puebla's 10th district during the 52nd session of Congress (1982 to 1985), in which he occupied the position of President of the Great Commission. Piña Olaya became governor of the State of Puebla in 1987 and served until 1993, but was viewed as weak and unpopular. Later, he became general director of the Mexican Light and Power Company, and then sub-coordinator of Public Security during the six-year term of the President Carlos Salinas.

Preceded by Guillermo Jiménez Morales	Governor of Puebla; 1987-1993	Succeeded by Manuel Bartlett
