= Eliseo Mendoza Berrueto =

Mexican politician and economist (1931–2022)

Governor of Coahuila
- In office 1 December 1987 – 30 November 1993
- Preceded by: José de las Fuentes Rodríguez
- Succeeded by: Rogelio Montemayor Seguy

President of the Chamber of Deputies
- In office 1 September 1985 – 30 September 1985
- Preceded by: Enrique Soto Izquierdo
- Succeeded by: Beatriz Paredes Rangel

Deputy of the Congress of the Union for the 1st district of Coahuila
- In office 1 September 1985 – 22 May 1987
- Preceded by: Abraham Cepeda Aguirre
- Succeeded by: Hilda Aurelia Lozano López

Personal details
- Born: 13 April 1931 San Pedro de las Colonias, Coahuila, Mexico
- Died: 17 May 2022 (aged 91)
- Party: Institutional Revolutionary Party
- Spouse: Lucila Ruiz Muzquiz

Eliseo Francisco Mendoza Berrueto (13 April 1931 – 17 May 2022) was a Mexican politician and economist. He served as the Governor of Coahuila from 1 December 1987 until 30 November 1993.

He was the President of the Chamber of Deputies in 1985.
