= Jesús Kumate Rodríguez =

Mexican physician and politician (1924–2018)

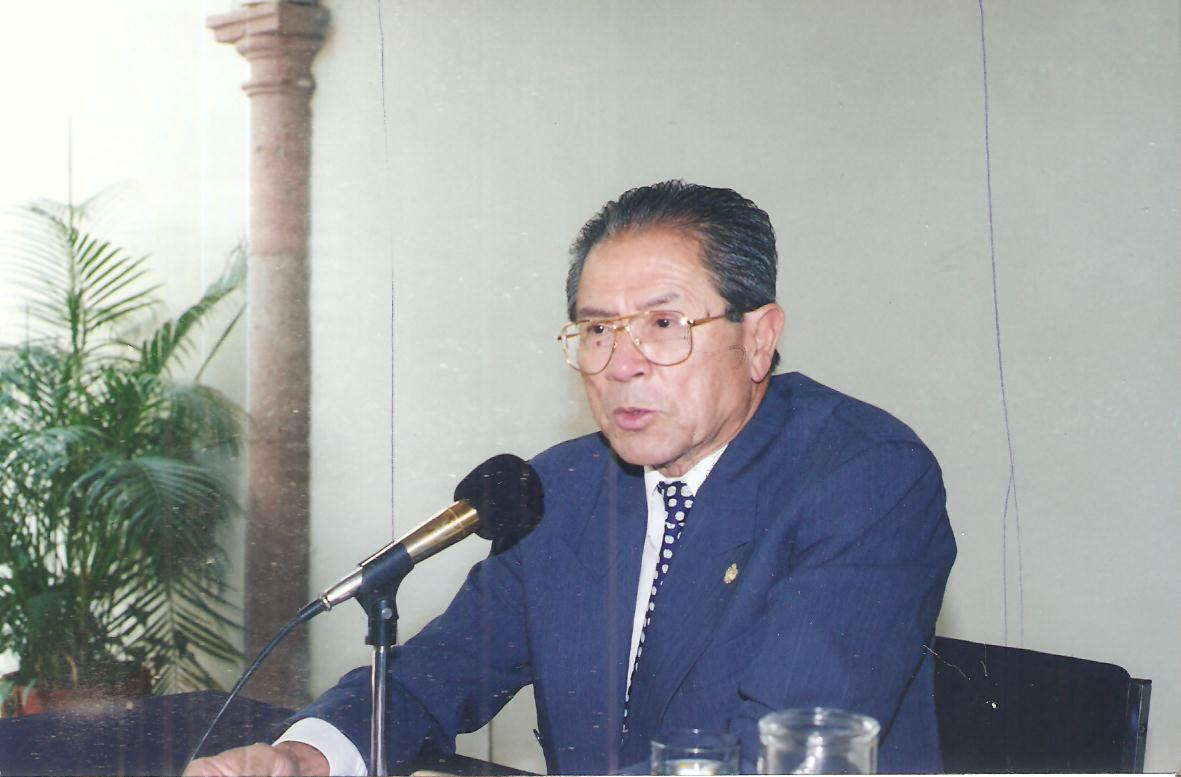

Secretary of Health
- In office 1 December 1988 – 30 November 1994
- President: Carlos Salinas de Gortari
- Preceded by: Guillermo Soberón Acevedo
- Succeeded by: Juan Ramón de la Fuente

Personal details
- Born: 12 November 1924 Culiacan, Sinaloa, Mexico
- Died: 7 May 2018 (aged 93) Mexico City, Mexico
- Spouse: Bertha Guerra Rovelo
- Education: Escuela Médico Militar; Instituto Politécnico Nacional
- Profession: Physician

Jesús Kumate Rodríguez (13 November 1924 – 7 May 2018) was a Mexican physician and politician. He served as the Secretary of Health during the presidency of Carlos Salinas de Gortari.

== Early life and education ==
Kumate Rodríguez was born in Mazatlán in 1924 to a Japanese emigrant father and a Sinaloense mother who worked as a rural teacher. He graduated as a surgeon in 1946 from the Escuela Médico Militar and became a Doctor of Science at the Instituto Politécnico Nacional in 1963.

== Career ==
During his tenure as Secretary of Health, Kumate Rodríguez oversaw the implementation of universal vaccination, the eradication of poliomyelitis, the combat against a cholera outbreak, the updating of epidemiological surveillance and the drastic decrease of infant mortality.

== Honours ==
- Legion of Honour, Chevalier and Officier
- Belisario Domínguez Medal of Honor, 2006
