= Américo Villarreal Guerra =

Mexican politician (1931-2010)

Governor of Tamaulipas
- In office 5 February 1987 – 4 February 1993
- Preceded by: Emilio Martínez Manautou
- Succeeded by: Manuel Cavazos Lerma

Personal details
- Born: 3 April 1931 Ciudad Victoria, Tamaulipas, Mexico
- Died: 23 June 2010 (aged 79) Ciudad Victoria, Tamaulipas, Mexico
- Party: Institutional Revolutionary Party
- Spouse: Paula Beatriz Anaya Guerrero
- Children: Américo Villarreal Anaya
- Education: National Autonomous University of Mexico
- Occupation: Politician, civil engineer

Américo Villarreal Guerra (3 April 1931–23 June 2010) was a Mexican politician and civil engineer. A member of the Institutional Revolutionary Party, he served as governor of Tamaulipas between 1987 and 1993. He also served as Senator. He is the father of Américo Villarreal Anaya, who has served as governor of Tamaulipas since 2022.
