= Fernando Gutiérrez Barrios =

Mexican politician

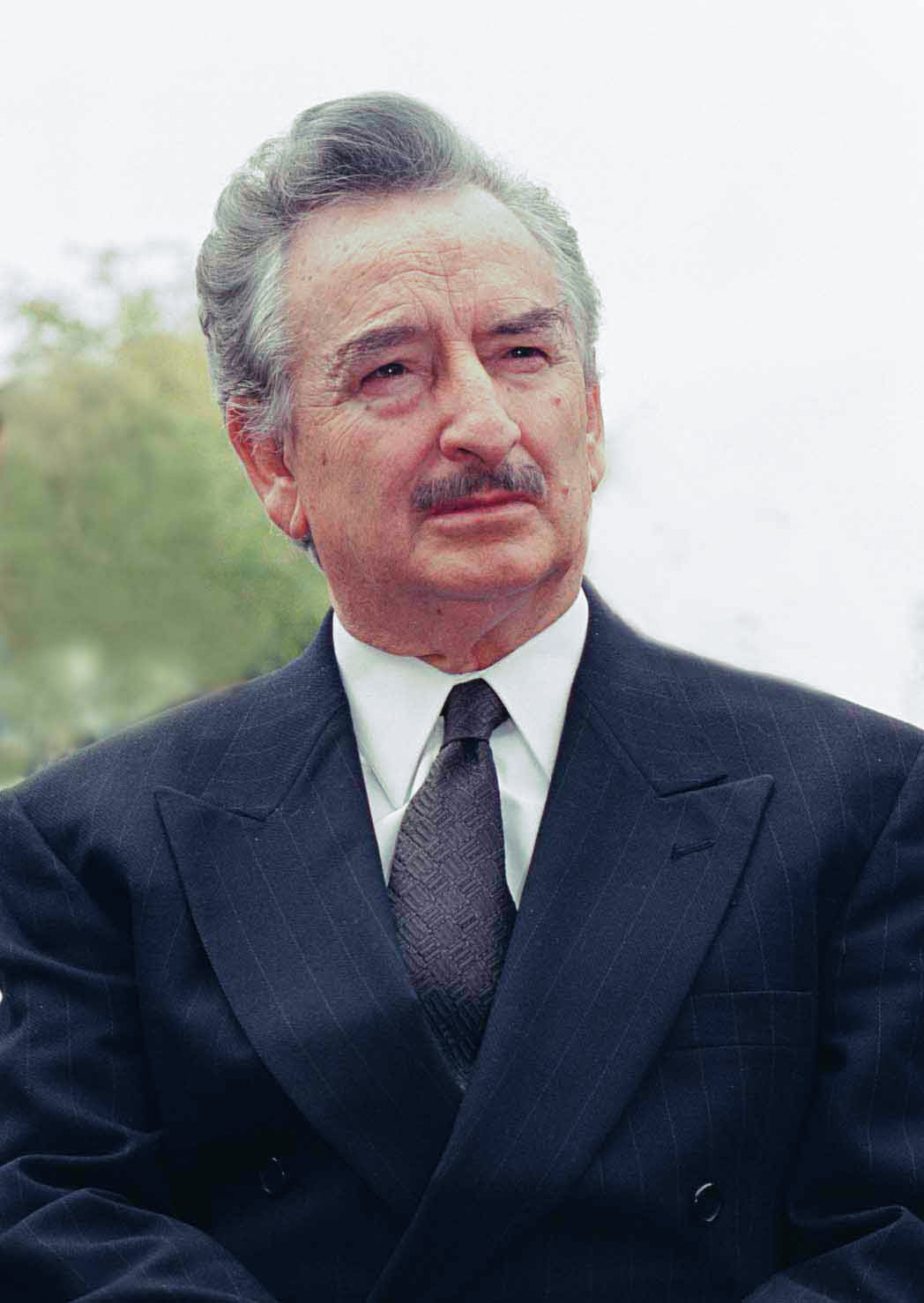

54th Governor of Veracruz
- In office 1 December 1986 – 30 November 1988
- Preceded by: Agustín Acosta Lagunes
- Succeeded by: Dante Delgado Rannauro

Personal details
- Born: October 26, 1927; Alto Lucero, Veracruz
- Died: October 30, 2000 (aged 73); Mexico City
- Political party: PRI
- Profession: Army, politician

Fernando Gutiérrez Barrios (October 26, 1927 – October 30, 2000) was a Mexican politician affiliated with the Institutional Revolutionary Party (PRI). He was in charge of the Dirección Federal de Seguridad secret police at the midst of the "dirty war" (1964–1970), and served as governor of Veracruz (1986–1988) and as Secretary of the Interior in the cabinet of President Carlos Salinas de Gortari.

Gutiérrez Barrios was born in Veracruz, Veracruz. His parents were Fernando Gutiérrez Ferrer and Ana María Barrios. He graduated from the Colegio Militar military academy in 1947 and joined the Institutional Revolutionary Party in 1950.

In the 2000 general election, voters in Veracruz elected Gutiérrez Barrios to the Senate for the 58th and 59th sessions of Congress. He took the oath of office on September 1, 2000, but died around two months later, on October 30. He was replaced by his alternate, Noemí Zoila Guzmán Lagunes.

== See also ==
- An Unknown Enemy (2018 TV series based on his life)

Preceded by Agustín Acosta Lagunes	Governor of Veracruz; 1986–1988	Succeeded by Dante Delgado Rannauro (Interim)
