= Manuel Camacho Solís =

Mexican politician (1946–2015)

Víctor Manuel Camacho Solís

Secretary of Foreign Affairs
- In office 29 November 1993 – 10 January 1994
- President: Carlos Salinas de Gortari
- Preceded by: Fernando Solana
- Succeeded by: Manuel Tello Macías

Head of the Federal District Department
- In office 1 December 1988 – 29 November 1993
- President: Carlos Salinas de Gortari
- Preceded by: Ramón Aguirre Velázquez
- Succeeded by: Manuel Aguilera Gómez

Secretary General of the Institutional Revolutionary Party
- In office 3 August 1988 – 3 December 1988
- President: Jorge de la Vega Domínguez
- Preceded by: Humberto Lugo Gil
- Succeeded by: Rafael Rodríguez Barrera

Secretary of Urban Development and Ecology
- In office 17 February 1986 – 3 August 1988
- President: Miguel de la Madrid
- Preceded by: Guillermo Carrillo Arena
- Succeeded by: Gabino Fraga Mouret

Personal details
- Born: 30 March 1946 Mexico City, Mexico
- Died: 5 June 2015 (aged 69) Mexico City, Mexico
- Party: Democratic Revolution (2003–2015)
- Other political affiliations: Institutional Revolutionary (1965–1995); Democratic Center (1999–2000)
- Spouse(s): Guadalupe Velasco Siles (died 1991); Mónica van der Vliet
- Children: 6
- Occupation: Senator

Víctor Manuel Camacho Solís (March 30, 1946 – June 5, 2015) was a Mexican politician who served in the cabinets of presidents Miguel de la Madrid and Carlos Salinas. Born in Mexico City to Manuel Camacho López and Luz Solís, he belonged to the Frente Amplio Progresista. At first he was affiliated with the PRI, later with the Party of the Democratic Center and then with the Party of the Democratic Revolution.

== Political career ==
Camacho Solís joined the Institutional Revolutionary Party (PRI) in 1965, and in 1988 he became that party's general secretary. Camacho met Carlos Salinas at the National Autonomous University of Mexico (UNAM), where they became close friends. Camacho followed Salinas's trajectory in the Planning Ministry under the administration of Miguel de la Madrid. In 1985 he was elected to the Chamber of Deputies, and in 1986 he was appointed to the cabinet as Minister of Urban Development. When Salinas took over the presidency in 1988, Camacho was appointed Head of Government of the Federal District (1988–1993), an important political post with jurisdiction over the nation's capital. In 1997, the post became elective. He was a contender within the PRI to be the presidential candidate, but Salinas chose Colosio instead. Salinas told Camacho that he would be appointed the Head of Government of the Federal District, a powerful post, but Camacho sought to be Minister of the Interior. Before he accepted the appointment, he made demands: complete control of the district attorney's office and the police, the right to participate in political reforms, and complete authority over the city, which Salinas acceded to. According to political scientist Jorge G. Castañeda, "Salinas ... perhaps did not realiz[e] the danger of being suddenly left without an effective minister of the interior and with an overqualified mayor in charge of the country's main city." He became famous because he delivered 9000 millions (old pesos ) to Andrés Manuel López Obrador in order to take away the protest on the zocalo in 1992 in Mexico City. This money never was clarified by Andrés Manuel López Obrador, he took the decision for the final destination for this money.

=== The Zapatista uprising ===
On November 13, 1993, Camacho was designated Secretary of Foreign Affairs. Due to the Zapatista uprising, Luis Donaldo Colosio's assassination in March 1994, and Camacho's failed attempt to clinch the party's presidential nomination, Camacho broke with the PRI. The complicated relationship between Camacho, Salinas, Colosio and Ernesto Zedillo (who was selected to replace Colosio as the PRI's presidential candidate) was the source of many rumors surrounding Colosio's assassination. Salinas appointed Camacho as the negotiator for the government in peace talks with the Zapatistas. He resigned as Chiapas Peace Commissioner on 16 June 1994 claiming that the PRI presidential candidate, Zedillo, sabotaged his efforts.

=== Later career ===
During Zedillo's presidency, Camacho stayed away from politics until 1999 when he announced his candidacy for the presidency for the Party of the Democratic Center, a party that he had co-founded with Marcelo Ebrard.

In 2003 he became a federal deputy in the Chamber of Deputies representing the Party of the Democratic Revolution. He was selected to serve as a plurinominal deputy through an indirect election. In 2012 he was elected to the Senate.

In 2004 he joined Andrés Manuel López Obrador's political campaign. He wrote a column in the Mexico City daily El Universal.

He died in Mexico City on 5 June 2015, after a long battle with brain cancer.

Political offices
| Preceded by Fernando Solana | Secretary of Foreign Affairs; 1993–1994 | Succeeded by Manuel Tello Macías |
