= Arsenio Farell =

Mexican politician (1921–2005)

Arsenio Farell Cubillas

Personal details
- Born: June 30, 1921 Mexico City
- Died: May 15, 2005 (aged 83) Mexico City
- Party: Institutional Revolutionary Party (PRI)
- Spouse: Rosa María Campa Padilla

Arsenio Farell Cubillas (June 30, 1921 – May 15, 2005) was a Mexican lawyer and politician affiliated with the Institutional Revolutionary Party (PRI). He served as Secretary of Labor in the cabinets of Miguel de la Madrid and Carlos Salinas and headed the Federal Comptroller's Secretariat in the cabinet of Ernesto Zedillo Ponce de León.

Farell Cubillas was born in Mexico City to Spanish immigrants Enrique Farell Solá and Consuelo Cubillas Gutiérrez. His brother was General Luis Farell Cubillas. He received a bachelor's, master's and doctorate's degree in law from the National Autonomous University of Mexico (UNAM), where he also taught several courses for almost 19 years (1954 – 1973) before heading the Mexican Institute of Social Security in the López Portillo administration. He was married to Rosa María Campa Padilla.

== Cultural references ==
Arsenio Farrell Industrial Park (in the text, the name appears with an additional letter 'r') is a fictional maquiladora which is mentioned several times in Roberto Bolaño's final novel 2666, specifically, in book four, The Part About the Crimes. It has been reported that Arsenio Farell Cubillas had assisted PRI's (Institutional Revolutionary Party) Miguel Nazar Haro and Luis Echeverría Álvarez to detain and torture suspected terrorists (leftists, intellectuals, etc.) during the Dirty War (Mexico), from 1964 to 1982. In the novel, several missing female persons are discovered at, or near, the maquiladora, which is located in Santa Teresa, a fictionalized version of Ciudad Juarez. The plot alludes to Northern Mexico's feminicide, beginning in the early 1990s and disproportionately affecting the border city. The maquiladoras also symbolize the PRI's long-standing facade of democracy and free trade built on the backs of the working poor. It has been reported that Farell helped cancel at least 400 unions across Mexico in the early 1990s. Regardless, other sources suggest 80-90% of all Mexican unions had fallen prey to organized crime by the 1990s.
