= 1998 in Mexico =

- Decades: 1970s; 1980s; 1990s; 2000s; 2010s
- See also: History of Mexico; List of years in Mexico; Timeline of Mexican history

Events in the year 1998 in Mexico.

== Incumbents ==
=== Federal government ===
- President: Ernesto Zedillo
- Interior Secretary (SEGOB): Emilio Chuayffet (until 3 January); Francisco Labastida (from 21 May)
- Secretary of Foreign Affairs (SRE): María del Rosario Green Macías
- Communications Secretary (SCT): Carlos Ruiz Sacristán
- Secretary of Defense (SEDENA): Enrique Cervantes Aguirre
- Secretary of Navy: José Ramón Lorenzo Franco
- Secretary of Labor and Social Welfare (STPS): José Antonio González Fernández
- Secretary of Welfare: Carlos Rojas Gutiérrez/Esteban Moctezuma
- Secretary of Public Education: Miguel Limón Rojas
- Tourism Secretary (SECTUR): Óscar Espinosa Villarreal
- Secretary of the Environment (SEMARNAT): Julia Carabias Lillo
- Secretary of Health (SALUD): Juan Ramón de la Fuente

=== Supreme Court ===
- President of the Supreme Court: José Vicente Aguinaco Alemán

=== Governors ===
- Aguascalientes
  - Otto Granados Roldán, (Institutional Revolutionary Party, PRI), until November 30
  - Felipe González González, PAN, starting December 1
- Baja California:
  - Héctor Terán Terán, (National Action Party (PAN)), died in office, October 4.
  - Alejandro González Alcocer, Substitute, PAN
- Baja California Sur: Leonel Cota Montaño (PRD)/Guillermo Mercado Romero (PRI)
- Campeche: José Antonio González Curi
- Chiapas: Julio Cesar Ruiz Ferro/Roberto Albores Guillén (PRI)
- Chihuahua: Francisco Barrio/Patricio Martínez García (PRI)
- Coahuila: Rogelio Montemayor Seguy (PRI)
- Colima: Fernando Moreno Peña (PRI)
- Durango: Ángel Sergio Guerrero Mier (PRI)
- Guanajuato: Vicente Fox (PAN)
- Guerrero: Angel Aguirre Rivero (PAN)
- Hidalgo: Jesús Murillo Karam/Alberto Cárdenas Jiménez (PAN)
- Jalisco: Humberto Lugo Gil/Manuel Angel Nunez Soto (PAN)
- State of Mexico: César Camacho Quiroz/Arturo Montiel Rojas (PRI)
- Michoacán: Víctor Manuel Tinoco
- Morelos: Antonio Riva Palacio López/Jorge Morales Barud (Substitute—PRI).
- Nayarit: Rigoberto Ochoa Zaragoza
- Nuevo León: Fernando Canales (PRI)
- Oaxaca: Heladio Ramírez López (PRI)
- Puebla: Melquiades Morales Flores/Manuel Bartlett Díaz (PRI)
- Querétaro: Ignacio Loyola Vera (PRI)
- Quintana Roo: Mario Villanueva Madrid/Joaquín Hendricks Díaz (PRI)
- San Luis Potosí: Manuel Bartlett Díaz/Fernando Silva Nieto (PRI)
- Sinaloa: Renato Vega Alvarado/Juan S. Millán (PRI)
- Sonora: Armando López Nogales (PRI)
- Tabasco: Roberto Madrazo Pintado (PRI)
- Tamaulipas: Manuel Cavazos Lerma
- Tlaxcala: José Antonio Álvarez Lima (PRI)
- Veracruz: Patricio Chirinos Calero/Miguel Alemán Velasco (PRI)
- Yucatán: Víctor Cervera Pacheco (PRI)
- Zacatecas: Ricardo Monreal Ávila (PRI)
- Head of Government of the Federal District
  - Cuauhtémoc Cárdenas, Party of the Democratic Revolution (PRD), (until September 29)
  - Rosario Robles (PRD) (starting September 29)

== Events ==
- El diario de Daniela begins airing on television.
- March 18: The TV channel Canal del Congreso is launched.
- April 21: the Pinacoteca Diego Rivera is inaugurated.
- August 30: 1998 Mexican Fobaproa funds referendum
- September 14: Camila (telenovela) begins.
- September 19: Nuestra Belleza México 1998

== Awards ==
- Belisario Domínguez Medal of Honor – José Angel Conchello Dávila (post mortem)
- Ohtli Award
  - Burton E. Grossman
  - Dolores Huerta
  - Pete Rodriguez
  - Guadalupe Reyes

== Hurricanes ==
- August 21–24: Tropical Storm Charley (1998)
- September 1–3: Hurricane Isis (1998)
- October 15–26: Hurricane Lester (1998)
- October 16–20: Hurricane Madeline (1998)
- October 22 – November 9: Hurricane Mitch

== Sport ==
- 1997–98 Mexican Primera División season.
- Guerreros de Oaxaca win the Mexican League.
- March 20: Homenaje a Salvador Lutteroth (1998)
- July 18: Ruleta de la Muerte (1998)
- December 13: Guerra de Titanes (1998)

== Births ==
- April 3 - Humberto Castellanos, baseball player
- November 10 – Karen Villanueva, rhythmic gymnast

== Deaths ==
- September 5 – Fernando Balzaretti, actor (b. 1946)
- December 13 – Ariadna Welter, actress (b. 1930)
