= 1996 in Mexico =

- Decades: 1970s; 1980s; 1990s; 2000s; 2010s
- See also: History of Mexico; List of years in Mexico; Timeline of Mexican history

Ojeda performing with Danza Invisible at a Mexican venue in 1996.

Events in the year 1996 in Mexico.

== Incumbents ==
=== Federal government ===
- President: Ernesto Zedillo
- Interior Secretary (SEGOB): Emilio Chuayffet.
- Secretary of Foreign Affairs (SRE): José Ángel Gurría
- Communications Secretary (SCT): Carlos Ruiz Sacristán
- Secretary of Defense (SEDENA): Enrique Cervantes Aguirre
- Secretary of Navy: José Ramón Lorenzo Franco
- Secretary of Labor and Social Welfare (STPS): José Antonio González Fernández
- Secretary of Welfare: Carlos Rojas Gutiérrez
- Secretary of Public Education: Miguel Limón Rojas
- Tourism Secretary (SECTUR): Óscar Espinosa Villarreal
- Secretary of the Environment (SEMARNAT): Julia Carabias Lillo
- Secretary of Health (SALUD): Juan Ramón de la Fuente

=== Supreme Court ===
- President of the Supreme Court: José Vicente Aguinaco Alemán

=== Governors ===
- Aguascalientes: Otto Granados Roldán, (Institutional Revolutionary Party, PRI)
- Baja California: Héctor Terán Terán, (National Action Party PAN).
- Baja California Sur: Guillermo Mercado Romero
- Campeche: Jorge Salomón Azar García
- Chiapas: Julio César Ruíz Ferro
- Chihuahua: Francisco Barrio
- Coahuila: Rogelio Montemayor Seguy
- Colima: Carlos de la Madrid Virgen
- Durango: Maximiliano Silerio Esparza
- Guanajuato: Vicente Fox Quesada
- Guerrero: Rubén Figueroa Alcocer/Ángel Aguirre Rivero
- Hidalgo: Jesús Murillo Karam
- Jalisco: Alberto Cárdenas Jiménez
- State of Mexico: César Camacho Quiroz
- Michoacán: Víctor Manuel Tinoco/Ausencio Chávez Hernández
- Morelos: Jorge Carrillo Olea (PRI).
- Nayarit: Rigoberto Ochoa Zaragoza
- Nuevo León: Benjamín Clariond
- Oaxaca: Diódoro Carrasco Altamirano
- Puebla: Manuel Bartlett Díaz
- Querétaro: Enrique Burgos García
- Quintana Roo: Mario Villanueva Madrid
- San Luis Potosí: Horacio Sánchez Unzueta
- Sinaloa: Renato Vega Alvarado
- Sonora: Manlio Fabio Beltrones Rivera
- Tabasco: Roberto Madrazo Pintado
- Tamaulipas: Manuel Cavazos Lerma
- Tlaxcala: José Antonio Álvarez Lima
- Veracruz: Patricio Chirinos Calero
- Yucatán: Víctor Cervera Pacheco
- Zacatecas: Arturo Romo Gutiérrez
- Regent of Mexico City: Oscar Espinosa Villarreal

== Events ==
- Universidad Metropolitana de Monterrey established.
- Alternative rock group Plastilina Mosh is founded.
- February 16: the San Andres Accords were signed.
- June: The Guadalajara Gay Pride is founded.
- June 28: The Popular Revolutionary Army announces its existence.
- September 22: Nuestra Belleza México 1996 held in Cancun.
- October 23: The Law of Protection of Commerce and Investments from Foreign Policies that Contravene International Law is published.

== Awards ==
- Belisario Domínguez Medal of Honor
  - Griselda Álvarez
  - Alí Chumacero
- Ohtli Award
  - Gonzalo Barrientos
  - Hector P. Garcia
  - Carlos Truan
  - Edward R. Roybal

== Births ==
- January 30 : Dafne Navarro, trampoline gymnast
- March 29 : Juanpa Zurita, Internet personality
- August 12 : Julio Urías, baseball player

== Deaths ==
- May 24 – Octavio Sentíes Gómez, 81, politician (PRI), Governor of Veracruz, Secretary of the Interior, Regent of DF (b. February 9, 1915)

== Hurricanes ==
- July 24 – August 6: Hurricane Cesar–Douglas
- August 19 – 26: Hurricane Dolly (1996)
- September 30 – October 4: Hurricane Hernan

== Sports ==
- 1995–96 Mexican Primera División season
- 1995–96 Copa Mexico
- Mexico wins the 1996 U.S. Cup
- Mexico loses in the final of the Pan American Games football tournament
- Mexico at the 1996 Summer Olympics
- Mexico at the 1996 Summer Paralympics
- Atlético Hidalgo, C.F. Cuautitlán and Real Sociedad de Zacatecas are founded.
