= 1995 in Mexico =

- Decades: 1970s; 1980s; 1990s; 2000s; 2010s
- See also: History of Mexico; List of years in Mexico; Timeline of Mexican history

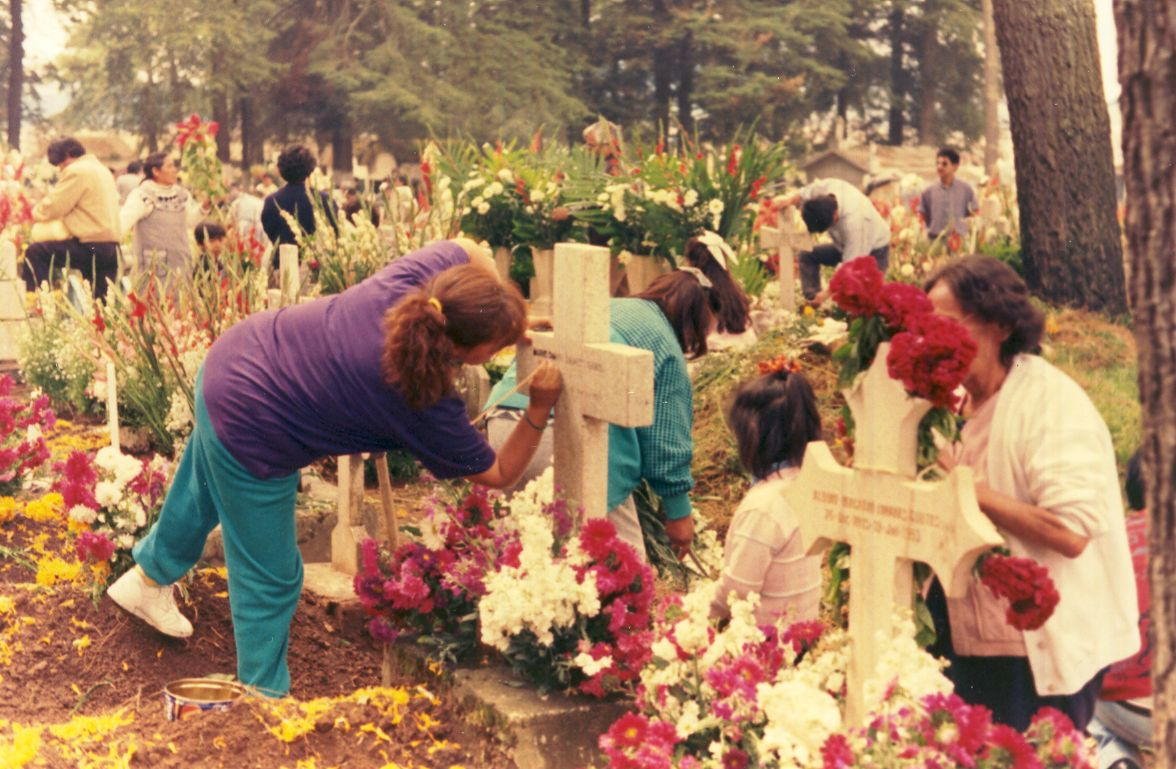

Events in the year 1995 in Mexico.

== Incumbents ==
=== Federal government ===
- President: Ernesto Zedillo
- Interior Secretary (SEGOB): Esteban Moctezuma (until 28 June), Emilio Chuayffet (starting 28 June)
- Secretary of Foreign Affairs (SRE): José Ángel Gurría
- Communications Secretary (SCT): Carlos Ruiz Sacristán
- Secretary of Defense (SEDENA): Enrique Cervantes Aguirre
- Secretary of Navy: José Ramón Lorenzo Franco
- Secretary of Labor and Social Welfare (STPS): Santiago Oñate Laborde (until 18 August)
- Secretary of Welfare: Carlos Rojas Gutiérrez
- Secretary of Public Education: Fausto Alzati/Miguel Limón Rojas
- Tourism Secretary (SECTUR): Silvia Hernández Enríquez
- Secretary of the Environment (SEMARNAT): Julia Carabias Lillo
- Secretary of Health (SALUD): Juan Ramón De La Fuente

=== Supreme Court ===
- President of the Supreme Court:

=== Governors ===
- Aguascalientes: Otto Granados Roldán, (Institutional Revolutionary Party, PRI)
- Baja California
  - Ernesto Ruffo Appel, (National Action Party PAN), until October 31.
  - Héctor Terán Terán, (PAN), starting November 1.
- Baja California Sur:
- Campeche: Jorge Salomón Azar García
- Chiapas: Eduardo Robledo Rincón/Francisco Barrio
- Chihuahua: Fernando Baeza Meléndez
- Coahuila: Rogelio Montemayor Seguy
- Colima: Carlos de la Madrid Virgen
- Durango: Maximiliano Silerio Esparza
- Guanajuato: Carlos Medina Plascencia/Vicente Fox
- Guerrero: Rubén Figueroa Alcocer
- Hidalgo: Jesús Murillo Karam
- Jalisco: Carlos Rivera Aceves/Alberto Cárdenas Jiménez
- State of Mexico: Emilio Chuayffet/César Camacho Quiroz
- Michoacán: Ausencio Chávez Hernández
- Morelos: Jorge Carrillo Olea (PRI).
- Nayarit: Diódoro Carrasco Altamirano
- Nuevo León: Sócrates Rizzo/Benjamin Clairmond (PRI)
- Oaxaca: Manuel Bartlett Díaz
- Puebla: Enrique Burgos García
- Querétaro: Mario Villanueva Madrid
- Quintana Roo: Horacio Sánchez Unzueta
- San Luis Potosí: Horacio Sánchez Unzueta
- Sinaloa: Renato Vega Alvarado
- Sonora: Manlio Fabio Beltrones Rivera
- Tabasco: Roberto Madrazo Pintado
- Tamaulipas: Manuel Cavazos Lerma
- Tlaxcala: José Antonio Álvarez Lima
- Veracruz: Patricio Chirinos Calero
- Yucatán: Víctor Cervera Pacheco
- Zacatecas: Arturo Romo Gutiérrez
- Regent of Mexico City: Oscar Espinosa Villarreal

== Events ==
- 1995 Zapatista Crisis
- Aeronaves TSM founded and started operating.
- January 1: The G3 Free Trade Agreement goes into effect.
- June 28: Aguas Blancas massacre
- August 27: 1995 Mexican referendums
- September 14: 1995 Guerrero earthquake
- October 9: 1995 Colima–Jalisco earthquake
- October 22: Nuestra Belleza México 1995

== Awards ==
- Belisario Domínguez Medal of Honor – Miguel León-Portilla

== Births ==
- January 2: Renata Notni, actress and model
- February 7: Roberto Osuna, baseball player
- February 12: Daniela Aedo, actress
- March 12: Daniela Magdaleno, bullfighting photographer (d. 2018).
- November 16: Victor González, baseball player
- December 22: Jean Dawson, experimental pop musician

== Deaths ==
- July 11: Claudio Brook, actor and producer, winner of two Ariel Awards, stomach cancer (b. 1927)

== Hurricanes ==
- August 9–12: Tropical Storm Gabrielle
- September 12–16: Hurricane Ismael
- September 27–October 5: Hurricane Opal
- October 7– 21: Hurricane Roxanne

== Sport ==
- 1994–95 Mexican Primera División season
- 1994–95 Copa Mexico
- Sultanes de Monterrey win the Mexican League.
- 1995 ITU Triathlon World Championships, is held in Cancún.
- CMLL 62nd Anniversary Show
