= 1997 in Mexico =

- Decades: 1970s; 1980s; 1990s; 2000s; 2010s
- See also: History of Mexico; List of years in Mexico; Timeline of Mexican history

Events in the year 1997 in Mexico.

== Incumbents ==
=== Federal government ===
- President: Ernesto Zedillo
- Interior Secretary (SEGOB): Emilio Chuayffet.
- Secretary of Foreign Affairs (SRE): José Ángel Gurría
- Communications Secretary (SCT): Carlos Ruiz Sacristán
- Secretary of Defense (SEDENA): Enrique Cervantes Aguirre
- Secretary of Navy: José Ramón Lorenzo Franco
- Secretary of Labor and Social Welfare (STPS): José Antonio González Fernández
- Secretary of Welfare: Carlos Rojas Gutiérrez
- Secretary of Public Education: Miguel Limón Rojas
- Tourism Secretary (SECTUR): Óscar Espinosa Villarreal
- Secretary of the Environment (SEMARNAT): Julia Carabias Lillo
- Secretary of Health (SALUD): Juan Ramón de la Fuente

=== Supreme Court ===
- President of the Supreme Court: José Vicente Aguinaco Alemán

=== Governors ===
- Head of Government of the Federal District
  - Oscar Espinosa Villarreal (PRI) (until December 4)
  - Cuauhtémoc Cárdenas (PRD) (starting December 5) First elected leader of Mexico City.
- Aguascalientes: Otto Granados Roldán, (PRI)
- Baja California: Héctor Terán Terán, (PAN).
- Baja California Sur: Guillermo Mercado Romero/Leonel Cota Montaño
- Campeche: Jorge Salomón Azar García/José Antonio González Curi
- Chiapas: Julio César Ruíz Ferro/Roberto Albores Guillén
- Chihuahua: Francisco Barrio (PAN)
- Coahuila: Rogelio Montemayor Seguy (PAN)
- Colima: Carlos de la Madrid Virgen/Fernando Moreno Peña (PAN)
- Durango: Ángel Sergio Guerrero Mier (PAN)
- Guanajuato: Vicente Fox Quesada (PAN),
- Guerrero: Ángel Aguirre Rivero
- Hidalgo: Jesús Murillo Karam
- Jalisco: Alberto Cárdenas Jiménez
- State of Mexico: César Camacho Quiroz
- Michoacán: Víctor Manuel Tinoco
- Morelos: Jorge Carrillo Olea (PRI).
- Nayarit: Rigoberto Ochoa Zaragoza
- Nuevo León: Benjamín Clariond/Fernando Canales
- Oaxaca: Diódoro Carrasco Altamirano
- Puebla: Manuel Bartlett Díaz
- Querétaro: Enrique Burgos García/Ignacio Loyola Vera
- Quintana Roo: Mario Villanueva Madrid
- San Luis Potosí: Horacio Sánchez Unzueta/Fernando Silva Nieto
- Sinaloa: Renato Vega Alvarado
- Sonora: Manlio Fabio Beltrones Rivera/Armando López Nogales
- Tabasco: Roberto Madrazo Pintado
- Tamaulipas: Manuel Cavazos Lerma
- Tlaxcala: José Antonio Álvarez Lima
- Veracruz: Patricio Chirinos Calero
- Yucatán: Víctor Cervera Pacheco
- Zacatecas: Arturo Romo Gutiérrez

== Events ==
- Convergence was founded as a "national political grouping".
- March 13: Phoenix Lights in Sonora.
- June 6: 1997 Mexican legislative election
- September: Nuestra Belleza México 1997
- December 22: Acteal Massacre

== Awards ==
- Belisario Domínguez Medal of Honor – Heberto Castillo

== Hurricanes ==
- June 1–7: Tropical Storm Andres (1997)
- September 16–26: Hurricane Nora (1997)
- September 26 – October 12: Tropical Storm Olaf (1997)
- October 5–10: Hurricane Pauline

== Sport ==
- 1996–97 Mexican Primera División season
- 1996–97 Copa Mexico
- Petroleros de Poza Rica win the Mexican League.
- Homenaje a Salvador Lutteroth (1997)
- Atlético Mexiquense and Chivas Tijuana are founded.
- The Chupacabras race is held for the first time.

=== Births ===
- October 29 – Ale Müller, actress and singer

== Deaths ==
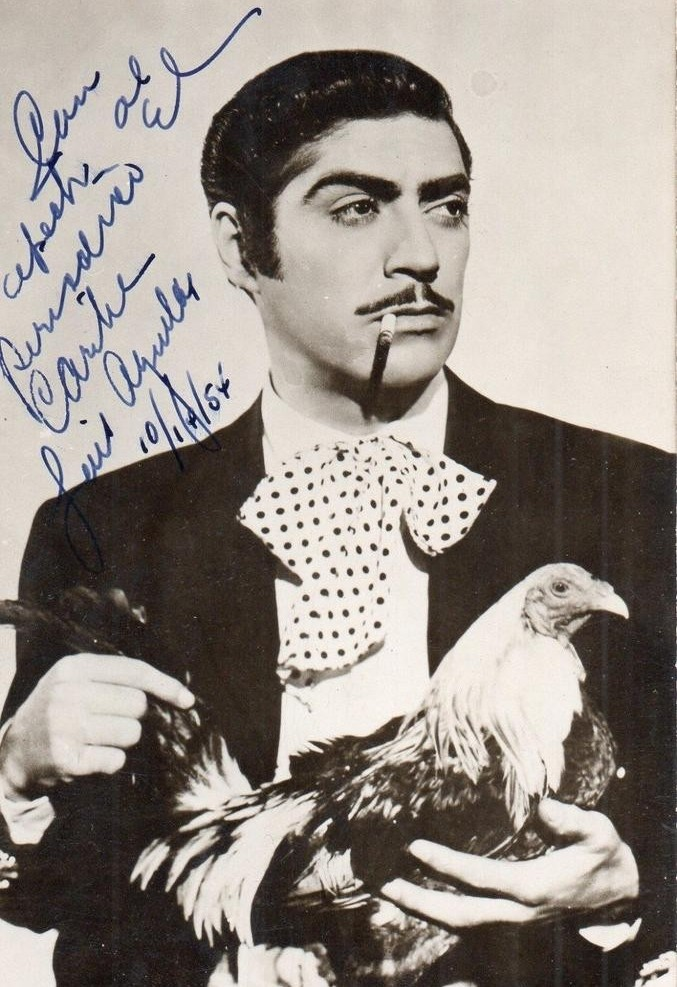
Luis Aguilar

- October 8 – Ernesto P. Uruchurtu (born 1906), head of the Federal District Department from 1952 to 1966
- October 24 – Luis Aguilar, actor and singer (b. 1918)
