= 1999 in Mexico =

- Decades: 1970s; 1980s; 1990s; 2000s; 2010s
- See also: History of Mexico; List of years in Mexico; Timeline of Mexican history

Events in the year 1999 in Mexico.

== Incumbents ==
=== Federal government ===
- President: Ernesto Zedillo
- Interior Secretary (SEGOB): Francisco Labastida (until 21 May); Diódoro Carrasco (from 21 May)
- Secretary of Foreign Affairs (SRE): María del Rosario Green Macías
- Communications Secretary (SCT): Carlos Ruiz Sacristán
- Education Secretary (SEP): Miguel Limón Rojas
- Secretary of Defense (SEDENA): Enrique Cervantes Aguirre
- Secretary of Navy: José Ramón Lorenzo Franco
- Secretary of Labor and Social Welfare (STPS): José Antonio González Fernández/Mariano Palacios Alcocer
- Secretary of Welfare: Esteban Moctezuma (until 4 August); Carlos Jarque (from 4 August)
- Secretary of Public Education: Miguel Limón Rojas
- Tourism Secretary (SECTUR): Óscar Espinosa Villarreal
- Secretary of the Environment (SEMARNAT): Julia Carabias Lillo
- Secretary of Health (SALUD): Juan Ramón de la Fuente (until 30 November); José Antonio González Fernández (from 30 November)

=== Supreme Court ===
- President of the Supreme Court: José Vicente Aguinaco Alemán then Genaro David Góngora Pimentel

=== Governors ===
- Aguascalientes: Felipe González González, (National Action Party, PAN)
- Baja California: Alejandro González Alcocer, Substitute, (PAN)
- Baja California Sur: Leonel Cota Montaño (PRD)/Guillermo Mercado Romero (PRI)
- Campeche: José Antonio González Curi
- Chiapas: Roberto Albores Guillén
- Chihuahua: Patricio Martínez García (PRI)
- Coahuila: Enrique Martínez y Martínez/Rogelio Montemayor Seguy (PRI)
- Colima: Fernando Moreno Peña (PRI)
- Durango: Ángel Sergio Guerrero Mier (PRI)
- Guanajuato: Vicente Fox/Ramon Martin Huerta (PAN)
- Guerrero: Angel Aguirre Rivero/René Juárez Cisneros (PAN)
- Hidalgo: Alberto Cárdenas Jiménez (PAN)
- Jalisco: Humberto Lugo Gil/Manuel Angel Nunez Soto (PAN)
- State of Mexico: César Camacho Quiroz/Arturo Montiel Rojas (PRI)
- Michoacán: Víctor Manuel Tinoco
- Morelos: Jorge Morales Barud (Substitute—PRI).
- Nayarit: Rigoberto Ochoa Zaragoza/Antonio Echevarría Domínguez
- Nuevo León: Fernando Canales (PRI)
- Oaxaca: Heladio Ramírez López (PRI)
- Puebla: Melquiades Morales Flores/Manuel Bartlett Díaz (PRI)
- Querétaro: Ignacio Loyola Vera (PRI)
- Quintana Roo: Mario Villanueva Madrid/Joaquín Hendricks Díaz (PRI)
- San Luis Potosí: Fernando Silva Nieto (PRI)
- Sinaloa: Juan S. Millán (PRI)
- Sonora: Armando López Nogales (PRI)
- Tabasco: Roberto Madrazo Pintado (PRI)
- Tamaulipas: Manuel Cavazos Lerma/Tomás Yarrington
- Tlaxcala: José Antonio Álvarez Lima/Alfonso Sánchez Anaya (PRI)
- Veracruz: Miguel Alemán Velasco
- Yucatán: Víctor Cervera Pacheco (PRI)
- Zacatecas: Ricardo Monreal Ávila (PRI)
- Head of Government of the Federal District
  - Cuauhtémoc Cárdenas, Party of the Democratic Revolution (PRD), (until September 29)
  - Rosario Robles (PRD) (starting September 29)

== Events ==
- The banderas monumentales program is initiated.
- January: 1999 UNAM strike
- March 21: 1999 Mexican referendums
- June 15: 1999 Tehuacán earthquake
- August 18–25: Hurricane Bret
- September 5–9: Hurricane Greg
- September 12: Nuestra Belleza México 1999
- September 30: 1999 Oaxaca earthquake
- September – October: 1999 Mexico floods
- November: Mexico hosts the first Parapan American Games

== Awards ==
- Belisario Domínguez Medal of Honor – Carlos Fuentes
- Order of the Aztec Eagle
- National Prize for Arts and Sciences
- National Public Administration Prize
- Ohtli Award
  - Deborah V. Ortiz
  - David R. Maciel

== Sport ==
- Primera División de México Verano 1999.
- Primera División de México Invierno 1999.
- 1999 FIFA Confederations Cup Final.
- Mexico participate in the 1999 Copa América and become 3rd.
- Homenaje a Dos Leyendas: El Santo y Salvador Lutteroth (1999).
- Ruleta de la Muerte (1999).
- 1999 Women's NORCECA Volleyball Championship in Monterrey.

== Television ==
=== Debuted ===
- Alma Rebelde
- Catalina y Sebastián
- Háblame de amor
- Laberintos de pasión
- Mujeres engañadas
- Nunca Te Olvidaré
- Por tu amor
- Rosalinda
- Tres mujeres
- Yacaranday

=== Ended ===
- Alma Rebelde
- Camila
- Catalina y Sebastián
- El diario de Daniela
- Nunca Te Olvidaré
- Por tu amor
- El Privilegio de Amar
- Rosalinda
- Yacaranday

== Deaths ==
- March 19: Jaime Sabines, Mexican poet (Horal, 1950) and Tarumba in Mexico City (b. 1926).
- May 15: Gutierre Tibón, Italian-Mexican writer (b. 1905)
- July 22: Lauro Ortega Martínez, 89, governor of Morelos 1982-1988 (b. 1910)
- November 21: Horacio Gómez Bolaños, 69, actor and comedian (b. 1930)

== See also ==
- List of Mexican films of 1999
