= Víctor Manuel Gandarilla =

Mexican politician

- Born: 20 November 1944 (age 81); Culiacán, Sinaloa, Mexico
- Occupation: Politician
- Political party: PRI

Víctor Manuel Gandarilla Carrasco (born 20 November 1944) is a Mexican politician from the Institutional Revolutionary Party (PRI).

Gandarilla Carrasco was born in Culiacán, Sinaloa, in 1944. He has sat in the federal Chamber of Deputies on three occasions:

- During the 48th Congress (1970–1973), as the alternate of Renato Vega Alvarado, for Sinaloa's 3rd district
- During the 55th Congress (1991–1994), for Sinaloa's 9th district
- During the 58th Congress (2000–2003), for Sinaloa's 7th district

He has also served as a local deputy in the 47th and 55th sessions of the Congress of Sinaloa and has been the general secretary of the Liga de Comunidades Agrarias and president of the Institutional Revolutionary Party in the state of Sinaloa.
