= Víctor Manuel Barceló =

Mexican politician

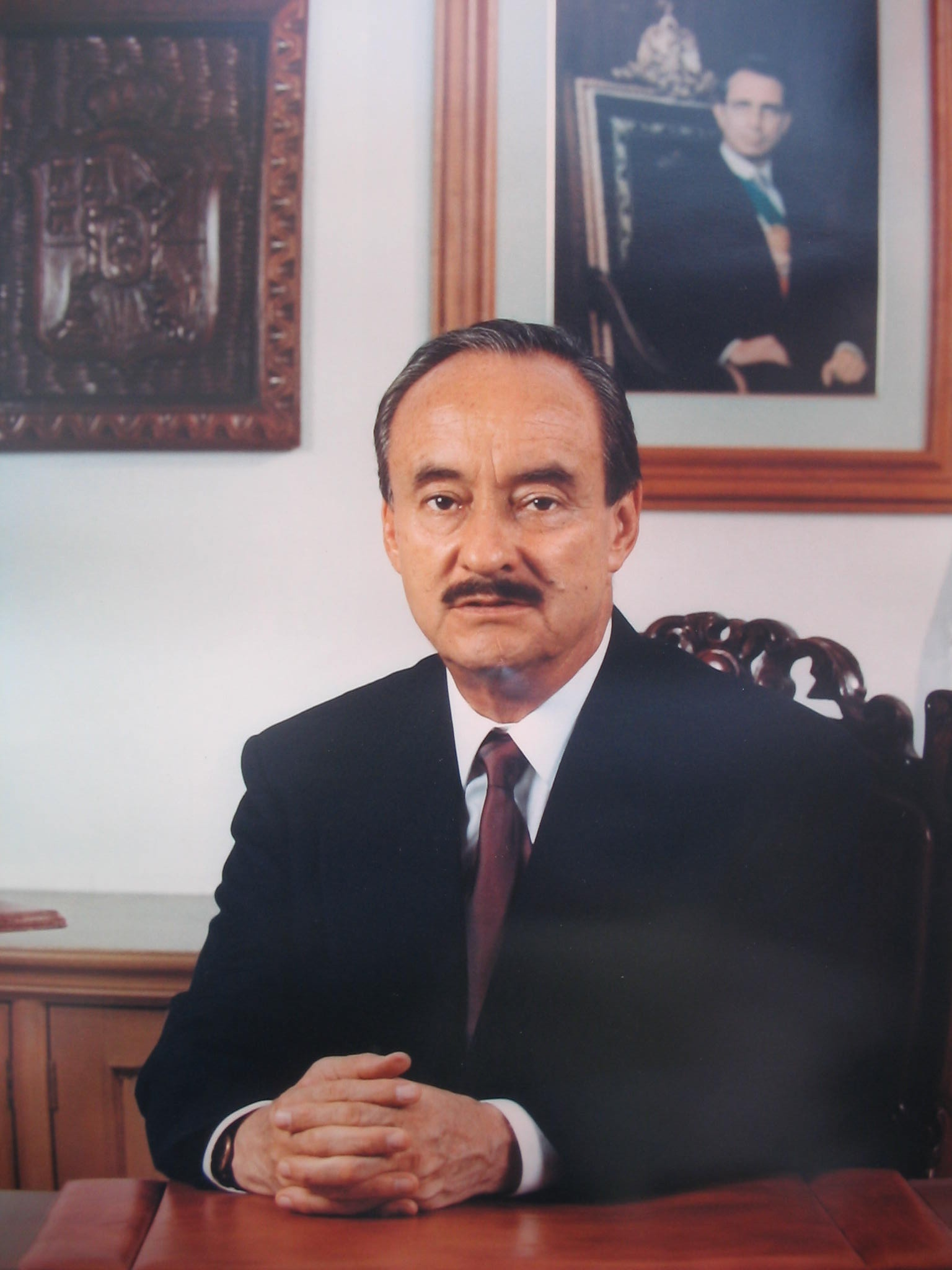

Víctor Manuel Barceló Rodriguez (born 1936 in Emiliano Zapata, Tabasco) is a Mexican politician and former Interim Governor of Tabasco, Mexico.

He was a Secretary of Interior during the administration of Roberto Madrazo Pintado as the Governor of Tabasco. When Madrazo decides to be gone in search of the presidential candidacy of its party, the PRI in 1999, requests license to be stayed away of the charge and Víctor Manuel Barceló is appointed as Interim.

Its step as the leader of the tabasqueña administration concluded once Madrazo was defeated by Francisco Labastida Ochoa in the internal and decided to return to conclude its constitutional mandate.

During their management corresponds him to organize and to supervise the actions and works to resolve the problems of floods caused by the hurricanes Opal and Roxane, that whipped the coasts and the Tabasco territory.

Barcelo has signed international treaties on behalf of Mexico.

Preceded by Roberto Madrazo Pintado	Governor of Tabasco (interim); 1999	Succeeded by Roberto Madrazo Pintado
