= José Rangel =

José Rangel may refer to:

- José Rangel Espinosa (born 1956), Mexican politician
- José Vicente Rangel (1929–2020), Venezuelan politician and journalist
- José Vicente Rangel Ávalos (born 1956), Venezuelan politician
- José Rangel (rower), Brazilian athlete, competed in rowing at the 2007 Pan American Games – Men's quadruple sculls
- José Rangel (hammer-thrower), Colombian athlete, competed at the 1974 South American Junior Championships in Athletics
