= Joel Molina Ramírez =

Mexican politician (1942–2020)

Senator for Tlaxcala
- In office 28 February 2019 – 24 October 2020 Serving with A. Rivera and M. Hernández
- Preceded by: José Antonio Álvarez Lima

Personal details
- Born: 1 November 1942 Ixtacuixtla, Tlaxcala, Mexico
- Died: 24 October 2020 (aged 77) Tlaxcala, Tlaxcala, Mexico
- Party: MORENA
- Occupation: Teacher

Joel Molina Ramírez (1 November 1942 – 24 October 2020) was a Mexican politician and senator representing the state of Tlaxcala from the National Regeneration Movement (MORENA) party. He served in the LXIV Legislature of the Mexican Congress from February 2019 until his death in office from COVID-19 during the COVID-19 pandemic in Mexico in October 2020, seven days short from his 78th birthday.

== Life ==
Molina was born 1 November 1942, in Ixtacuixtla and graduated from the Evening Normal School.

Previously the chief of finances, then the local leader, of the Sindicato Nacional de Trabajadores de la Educación teachers' union in the late 1970s, Molina—then a member of the Institutional Revolutionary Party—was elected to the Congress of Tlaxcala in 1980, serving a three-year term; he then became the municipal president of Ixtacuixtla between 1986 and 1988. He worked in several state government positions and served as the president of the Tlaxcala Electoral Institute between 1994 and 1996.

Molina was named secretary of education in the Tlaxcala state government in 1997, during the administration of José Antonio Álvarez Lima.

After decades in the PRI, he switched and became a founding member of MORENA; in 2016, he served as a coordinator for Martha Palafox Gutiérrez's gubernatorial campaign. By 2020, he was serving as the interim director of the MORENA party in Tlaxcala.

=== Senate ===
Molina was elected as the alternate senator to Álvarez Lima in 2018. However, Álvarez Lima was immediately appointed by President Andrés Manuel López Obrador to head public television station Canal Once. On 28 February 2019, Molina was sworn in. He was a contender for the Morena nomination in the 2021 Tlaxcala gubernatorial election, despite his advanced age and having undergone previous surgeries.

In October 2020, Molina contracted COVID-19 and was admitted to an ISSSTE hospital in Tlaxcala. He died on 24 October, making him the first senator to die of the disease. It was revealed before his death that he had been in the chamber as late as 20 October, for a 12-hour session to vote on the dissolution of various government trusts, during which senators passed around microphones. His death prompted Álvarez Lima to announce that he would resign from Canal Once and return to the Senate in the second half of November, after a new director for the television channel was appointed.
