= María Teresa Marú Mejía =

Mexican politician (1958–2021)

María Teresa Marú Mejía (29 October 1958, in Mexico City – 3 August 2021, in Mexico City) was a Mexican politician affiliated with the Labour Party (PT).

She served in the Chamber of Deputies, representing the State of Mexico's third district, from 2018 till her death from COVID-19 on 3 August 2021, at age 62, during the COVID-19 pandemic in Mexico.
