= 9th federal electoral district of Sinaloa =

Defunct federal electoral district of Mexico

Coordinates: 23°13′N 106°25′W

The 9th federal electoral district of Sinaloa (Spanish: Distrito electoral federal 09 de Sinaloa) is a defunct federal electoral district of Mexico.

During its existence it elected one deputy to the Chamber of Deputies for each three-year legislative session by means of the first-past-the-post system. Votes cast in the district also counted towards the calculation of proportional representation ("plurinominal") deputies elected from the country's electoral regions.

The 9th district was created as part of the 1977 electoral reforms, which increased the number of single-member seats in the Chamber of Deputies from 196 to 300. Under that plan, Sinaloa's seat allocation rose from five to nine. It was dissolved by the Federal Electoral Institute (IFE) in its 1996 redistricting process because the state's population no longer warranted nine districts. Accordingly, it elected its first deputy in the 1979 mid-term election and its last in the 1994 general election.

== District territory ==
Evolution of electoral district numbers
	1974	1978	1996	2005	2017	2023
Sinaloa	5	9	8	8	7	7
Chamber of Deputies	196	300				

1978–1996

From its creation to its dissolution, the 9th district covered a portion of the state capital, Culiacán Rosales, and parts of the rural area of its surrounding municipality. The head town was at Culiacán.

== Deputies returned to Congress ==
(Mexico) National parties
- Current
- PAN
- PRI
- PT
- PVEM
- MC
- Morena
- Defunct or local only
- PLM
- PNR
- PRM
- PNM
- PP
- PPS
- PARM
- PFCRN
- Convergencia
- PANAL
- PSD
- PES
- PES
- PRD

Sinaloa's 9th district
Election	Deputy	Party	Term	Legislature
1979	José Carlos de Saracho Calderón	Institutional Revolutionary Party	1979–1982	51st Congress
1982	Manuel Tarriba Rojo	Institutional Revolutionary Party	1982–1985	52nd Congress
1985	Renato Vega Alvarado	Institutional Revolutionary Party	1985–1988	53rd Congress
1988	Pablo Moreno Cota	Institutional Revolutionary Party	1988–1991	54th Congress
1991	Víctor Manuel Gandarilla Carrasco	Institutional Revolutionary Party	1991–1994	55th Congress
1994	Jesús Rafael Ruvalcaba León	Institutional Revolutionary Party	1994–1997	56th Congress
