= 3rd federal electoral district of the State of Mexico =

Federal electoral district of Mexico

State of Mexico's 3rd
- Electoral district of the Chamber of Deputies of Mexico

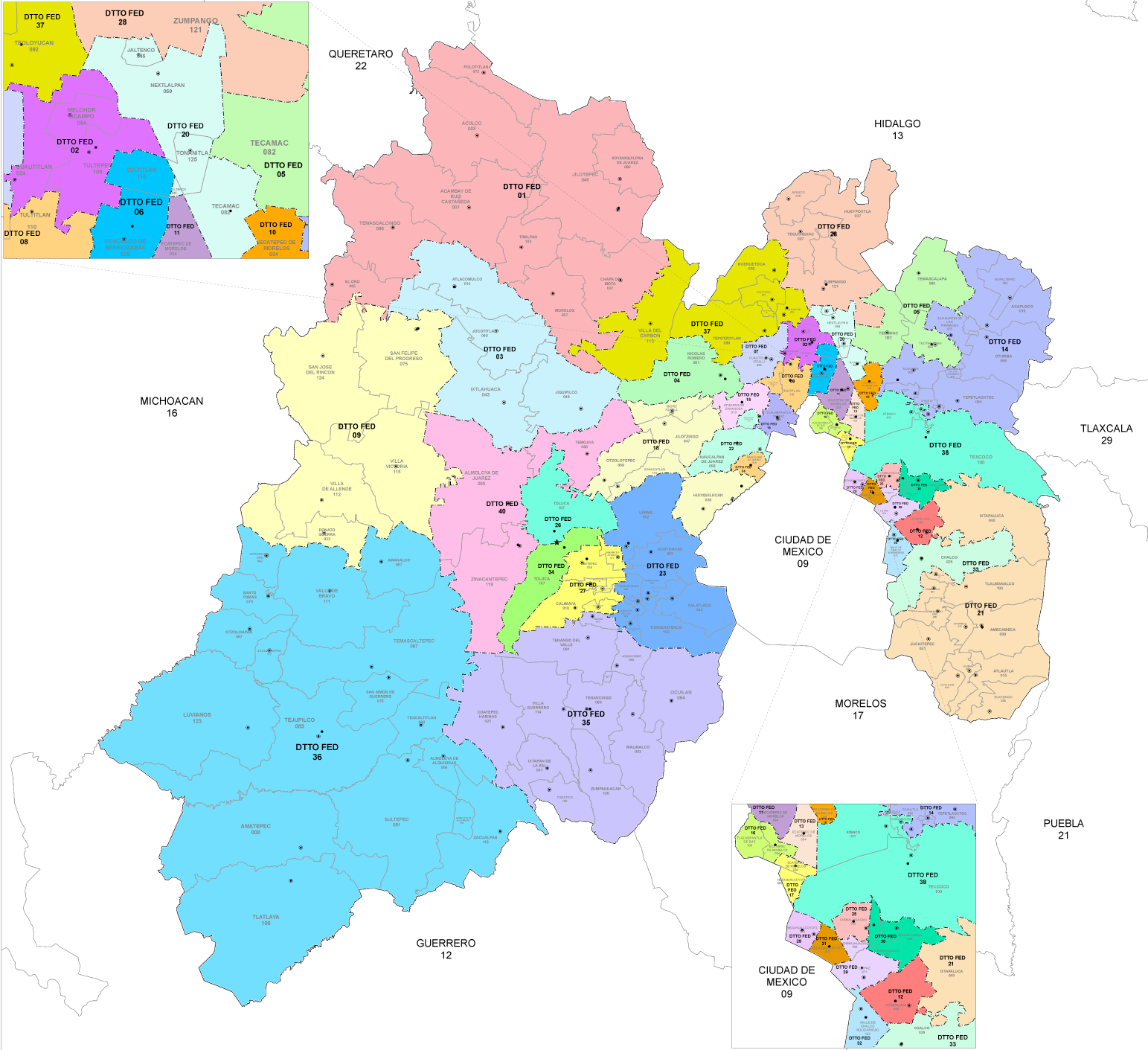
- State of Mexico's districts since 2023

Incumbent
- Member: Diana Castillo Gabino
- Party: ▌Labour Party
- Congress: 66th (2024–2027)

District
- State: State of Mexico
- Head town: Atlacomulco de Fabela
- Coordinates: 19°48′N 99°52′W
- Covers: Atlacomulco, Ixtlahuaca, Jiquipilco, Jocotitlán
- PR region: Fifth
- Precincts: 148
- Population: 415,863 (2020 census)
- Indigenous: Yes (65%)

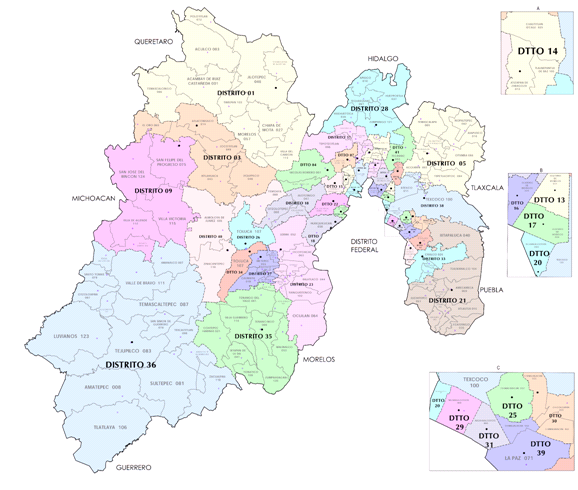
2017–2022 districting scheme

The 3rd federal electoral district of the State of Mexico (Spanish: Distrito electoral federal 03 del Estado de México) is one of the 300 electoral districts into which Mexico is divided for elections to the federal Chamber of Deputies and one of 40 such districts in the State of Mexico.

It elects one deputy to the lower house of Congress for each three-year legislative session by means of the first-past-the-post system. Votes cast in the district also count towards the calculation of proportional representation ("plurinominal") deputies elected from the fifth region.

The current member for the district, elected in the 2024 general election, is Diana Castillo Gabino. Originally elected for the National Regeneration Movement (Morena), she switched allegiance to the Labour Party on 19 September 2024.

== District territory ==
Under the 2023 districting plan adopted by the National Electoral Institute (INE), which is to be used for the 2024, 2027 and 2030 federal elections, the 3rd district covers 148 electoral precincts (secciones electorales) across four municipalities in the north-west of the state:

- Atlacomulco, Ixtlahuaca, Jiquipilco and Jocotitlán.

The head town (cabecera distrital), where results from individual polling stations are gathered together and tallied, is the city of Atlacomulco de Fabela.

The district reported a population of 415,863 in the 2020 census. With Indigenous and Afrodescendent inhabitants accounting for over 65% of that number, the 3rd district is classified by the INE as an indigenous district. (Note: Population figure indicates total inhabitants, not voters. The INE deems any local or federal electoral district where Indigenous or Afrodescendent inhabitants number 40% or more of the total to be an indigenous district.)

== Previous districting schemes ==
Evolution of electoral district numbers
	1974	1978	1996	2005	2017	2023
State of Mexico	15	34	36	40	41	40
Chamber of Deputies	196	300				

Under the previous districting plans enacted by the INE and its predecessors, the 3rd district was situated as follows:

2005–2022

The district had the same configuration under both the 2017–2022 and 2005–2017 schemes. It covered the municipalities of Atlacomulco, Ixtlahuaca, Jiquipilco, Jocotitlán and El Oro. The head town was at Atlacomulco.

1996–2005

The municipalities of El Oro, Temascalcingo, San Felipe del Progreso, San José del Rincón and Villa Victoria. The head town was at San Felipe del Progreso.

1978–1996

The municipalities of Almoloya del Río, Atizapán, Calimaya, Capulhuac, Chapultepec, Jalatlaco, Joquicingo, Lerma, Mexicaltzingo, Ocoyoacac, Rayón, San Antonio la Isla, San Mateo Atenco, Tenango del Valle, Texcalyacac, Tianguistenco and Zinacantepec, with its head town at Lerma.

== Deputies returned to Congress ==
(Mexico) National parties
- Current
- PAN
- PRI
- PT
- PVEM
- MC
- Morena
- PAZ
- Somos
- Defunct or local only
- PLM
- PNR
- PRM
- PNM
- PP
- PPS
- PARM
- PFCRN
- CON
- PANAL
- PSD
- PES
- PES
- PRD

State of Mexico's 3rd district
Election	Deputy	Party	Term	Legislature
1916	Enrique O'Farril		1916–1917	Constituent Congress of Querétaro
...
1979	Alberto Rábago Camacho	Institutional Revolutionary Party	1979–1982	51st Congress
1982	Hugo Díaz Velázquez	Institutional Revolutionary Party	1982–1985	52nd Congress
1985	Alberto Rábago Camacho	Institutional Revolutionary Party	1985–1988	53rd Congress
1988	Octavio Moreno Toscano	Popular Socialist Party (Mexico)	1988–1991	54th Congress
1991	Armando Neira Chávez	Institutional Revolutionary Party	1991–1994	55th Congress
1994	Lauro Rendón Castrejón	Institutional Revolutionary Party	1994–1997	56th Congress
1997	María Trinidad Emma Salinas López	Institutional Revolutionary Party	1997–2000	57th Congress
2000	Juan Manuel Martínez Nava	Institutional Revolutionary Party	2000–2003	58th Congress
2003	José Rangel Espinosa	Institutional Revolutionary Party	2003–2006	59th Congress
2006	Óscar Cárdenas Monroy	Institutional Revolutionary Party	2006–2009	60th Congress
2009	Emilio Chuayffet Chemor	Institutional Revolutionary Party	2009–2012	61st Congress
2012	José Rangel Espinosa	Institutional Revolutionary Party	2012–2015	62nd Congress
2015	Fidel Almanza Monroy	Institutional Revolutionary Party	2015–2018	63rd Congress
2018	María Teresa Marú Mejía	Labour Party (Mexico)	2018–2021	64th Congress
2021	Óscar Cárdenas Monroy	Institutional Revolutionary Party	2021–2024	65th Congress
2024	Diana Castillo Gabino (Note: Originally elected for Morena, Castillo Gabino was among the five deputies who switched to the Labour Party on 19 September 2024.)	National Regeneration Movement Labour Party (Mexico)	2024–2027	66th Congress

== Presidential elections ==
State of Mexico's 3rd district
Election	District won by	Party or coalition	%
2018	Andrés Manuel López Obrador	Juntos Haremos Historia	51.8717
2024	Claudia Sheinbaum Pardo	Sigamos Haciendo Historia	60.2936
