= Francisco Rojas Gutiérrez =

Mexican politician (1944–2025)

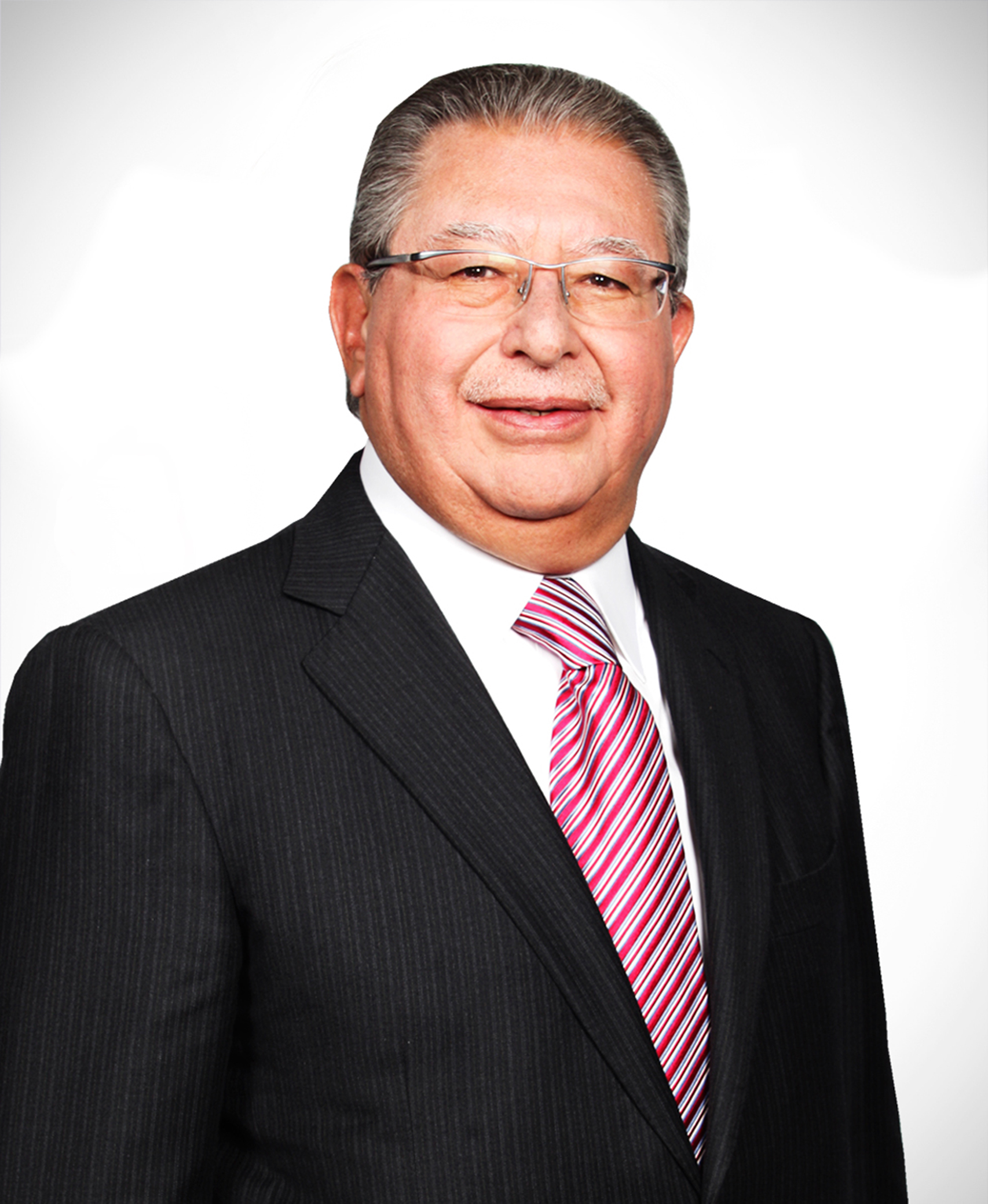
- Born: 15 September 1944; Mexico City, Mexico
- Died: 31 October 2025 (aged 81)
- Education: National Autonomous University of Mexico
- Occupation: Politician
- Political party: PRI

Francisco José Rojas Gutiérrez (15 September 1944 – 31 October 2025) was a Mexican politician affiliated with the Institutional Revolutionary Party (PRI).

== Life and career ==
Rojas Gutiérrez was a native of Mexico City. He served two terms in the Chamber of Deputies – from 2003 to 2006, during the 59th Congress, and from 2009 to 2012, during the 61st Congress – both times as a plurinominal deputy.

He was the director of Pemex from 1987 to 1994 and, from 2012 to 2014, he was the director of the Federal Electricity Commission (CFE).

Rojas Gutiérrez died on 31 October 2025, at the age of 81.

== See also ==
- Carlos Rojas Gutiérrez (1954–2024), brother.
