= Ulises Ramírez Núñez =

Mexican politician

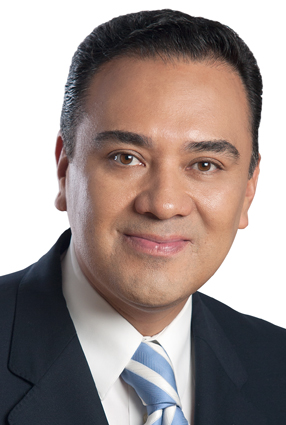

Member of the Senate for the State of Mexico
- In office 1 September 2006 – 31 August 2012
- Preceded by: César Camacho Quiroz
- Succeeded by: Alejandro Encinas Rodríguez

Personal details
- Born: 2 October 1967 (age 58) Mexico City, Mexico
- Party: PAN
- Spouse: Angélica Alatorre Carbajal
- Occupation: Deputy

Ulises Ramírez Núñez (born 12 October 1967) is a Mexican politician affiliated with the PAN. He served as a federal deputy in the LXIII Legislature of the Mexican Congress, representing the State of Mexico from the fifth electoral region. He also served as a senator of the LX and LXI Legislatures and as a deputy during the LVIII Legislature.

== Life ==
Ramírez was active in the PAN as early as 1991, when he served as a national councilor; after stints at the Legislative Investigation Center for the LV Legislature and as a political analyst for the city of Naucalpan de Juárez, he would rejoin the party in 1999. The next year, he was elected to the LVIII Legislature for the State of Mexico's 15th district, sitting on commissions dealing with National Defense, Strengthening of Federalism, and Special on Public Safety.

With his first term as a legislator over, Ramírez ran for the municipal presidency of Tlalnepantla de Baz and won, serving a three-year term. He then returned to the legislature, this time as a senator in the LX and LXI Legislatures. He presided over the Public Safety Commission and sat on those for Constitutional Points, Government, Justice, Rules and Parliamentary Practices, Federal District, Jurisdictional, and Radio, Television and Film. After his six-year term ended, he was sent to the LVIII Legislature of the Congress of the State of Mexico, where he was the PAN's parliamentary coordinator.

The PAN returned Ramírez to the Chamber of Deputies in 2015 as a proportional representation deputy from the fifth region. He sat on the Government, Justice, and Constitutional Points Commissions.

== See also ==
- 2003, Mexico state election

Preceded by Rubén Mendoza Ayala	Municipal President of Tlalnepantla, State of Mexico; 2003–2006	Succeeded by Marco Antonio Rodríguez Hurtado
