= Juan Manuel Martínez Nava =

Mexican politician

- Born: 15 February 1954 (age 72); San Felipe del Progreso, State of Mexico, Mexico
- Occupation: Politician
- Political party: PRI

Juan Manuel Martínez Nava (born 15 February 1954) is a Mexican politician from the Institutional Revolutionary Party (PRI). From 2000 to 2003 he served in the Chamber of Deputies to represent the State of Mexico's third district.
