= 1998 Mexican Fobaproa funds referendum =

30 August 1998

Results
Choice	Votes	%
Government proposal	26,488	0.89%
PRD proposal	2,903,004	97.05%
Other proposals	61,617	2.06%
Valid votes	2,991,109	97.73%
Invalid or blank votes	69,603	2.27%
Total votes	3,060,712	100.00%

An unofficial referendum on use of Fobaproa funds was held in Mexico on 30 August 1998. It was organised by the opposition Party of the Democratic Revolution (PRD), who proposed that only small- and medium-sized businesses would be compensated by the funds. Slightly over 97% voted in favour of the PRD's proposal, and the Chamber of Deputies subsequently agreed to the change on 12 December by a vote of 325 to 159.

== Results ==
Choice	Votes	%
Government proposal	26,488	0.89
PRD proposal	2,903,004	97.05
Other proposal	61,617	2.06
Invalid/blank votes	69,603	–
Total	3,060,712	100.00
Registered voters/turnout		
Source: Direct Democracy
