= Universidad Metropolitana de Monterrey =

Mexican university

Coordinates: 25.6734°N 100.3116°W

- Former names: Preparatoria Metropolitana de Monterrey; Universitario Metropolitano de Monterrey
- Type: Private university
- Established: 1996
- Location: Monterrey, Nuevo León, Mexico
- Mascot: Lions
- Website: www.umm.edu.mx

Universidad Metropolitana de Monterrey (UMM) is a private university founded in 1996 in Monterrey, Nuevo León, Mexico. It began as a high school in 1989.
