= Guadalupe Reyes =

American activist and community leader (1918–2000)

Guadalupe Reyes (1918 – December 31, 2000) was an American activist and community leader.

== Early life ==
Guadalupe Reyes
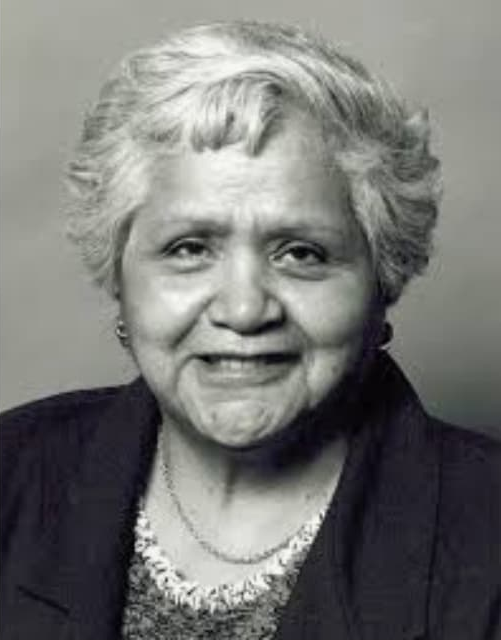
- Born: 1918, Oklahoma, U.S.
- Died: December 31, 2000 (aged 82) Chicago, Illinois, U.S.
- Occupations: Activist, community leader

The oldest daughter in a family of migrant farm workers whose parents had emigrated from Mexico, she was born Guadalupe Alcala in Oklahoma. In 1937, she moved to Chicago, where she married Andres Reyes in 1939 and settled in the Hyde Park neighborhood. The couple had 11 children. In 1958, they moved to the predominantly Hispanic neighborhood of Pilsen. Her husband died of cancer in 1970.

== Activism and work ==
After developing spinal meningitis soon after birth, her son Bobby was left mentally and physically disabled. Unable to find suitable care facilities for her son, she started a support group in her own home for children who had developmental disabilities. In 1969, she started a school in a church basement to help educate these children. In 1972, she established an agency that provides skills training and employment for adults who have developmental disabilities.

Reyes helped lead the push for a new high school in Pilsen, later known as Benito Juarez Community Academy. In 1972, she established Fiesta del Sol, a summertime party for the neighborhood. She also helped establish a senior's centre Proyecto Maravilla in Pilsen.

Reyes served nine years on the board for the Chicago Transit Authority.

== Death and legacy ==
She died at home in Pilsen of pulmonary hypertension at the age of 82.

Guadalupe Reyes Park in Chicago was named in her honor.
