= Óscar Cárdenas Monroy =

Mexican politician

- Born: 4 March 1954 (age 72); Jocotitlán, State of Mexico, Mexico
- Occupation: Politician
- Political party: PRI

Óscar Gustavo Cárdenas Monroy (born 4 March 1954) is a Mexican politician affiliated with the Institutional Revolutionary Party (PRI).

He has served in the Chamber of Deputies on three occasions: from 1994 to 1997, as a plurinominal deputy; and 2006–2009 and 2021–2024, both times for the State of Mexico's third district.

He also served in the XLIX and LV Legislatures of the Congress of the State of Mexico, as well as the municipal president of Jocotitlán.
