= 1995 Mexican referendums =

A series of unofficial referendums on elections, political reforms and electoral participation was held in Mexico on 27 August 1995. It was organised by the Zapatista Army of National Liberation (EZLN), who proposed a detailed reform for democratization, that the country engage in free and reformed elections and that the EZLN convert itself into a political party and form a united front with other opposition parties. Another referendum question sought to establish equality for women in government and administration. All these measures passed, but this unofficial referendum appears to have had little effect on Mexican governance.
