= 1999 Mexican referendums =

A series of unofficial referendums on native rights and good governance was held in Mexico on 21 March 1999. It was organised by the Zapatista Army of National Liberation (EZLN), who proposed the government function in the interests of the people, that the country demilitarize in order to promote peace, that indigenous Mexicans be fully included in national life and have their rights recognized in the constitution. While all these measures passed overwhelmingly, only around 2.5 million people voted in the referendum, while 37 million people voted in the general election the following year.
