= María Serrano Serrano =

Mexican politician (born 1957)

María Serrano Serrano (born 5 April 1957 in San Javier, Sinaloa) is a Mexican politician and member of the Partido Acción Nacional ("National Action Party", PAN).

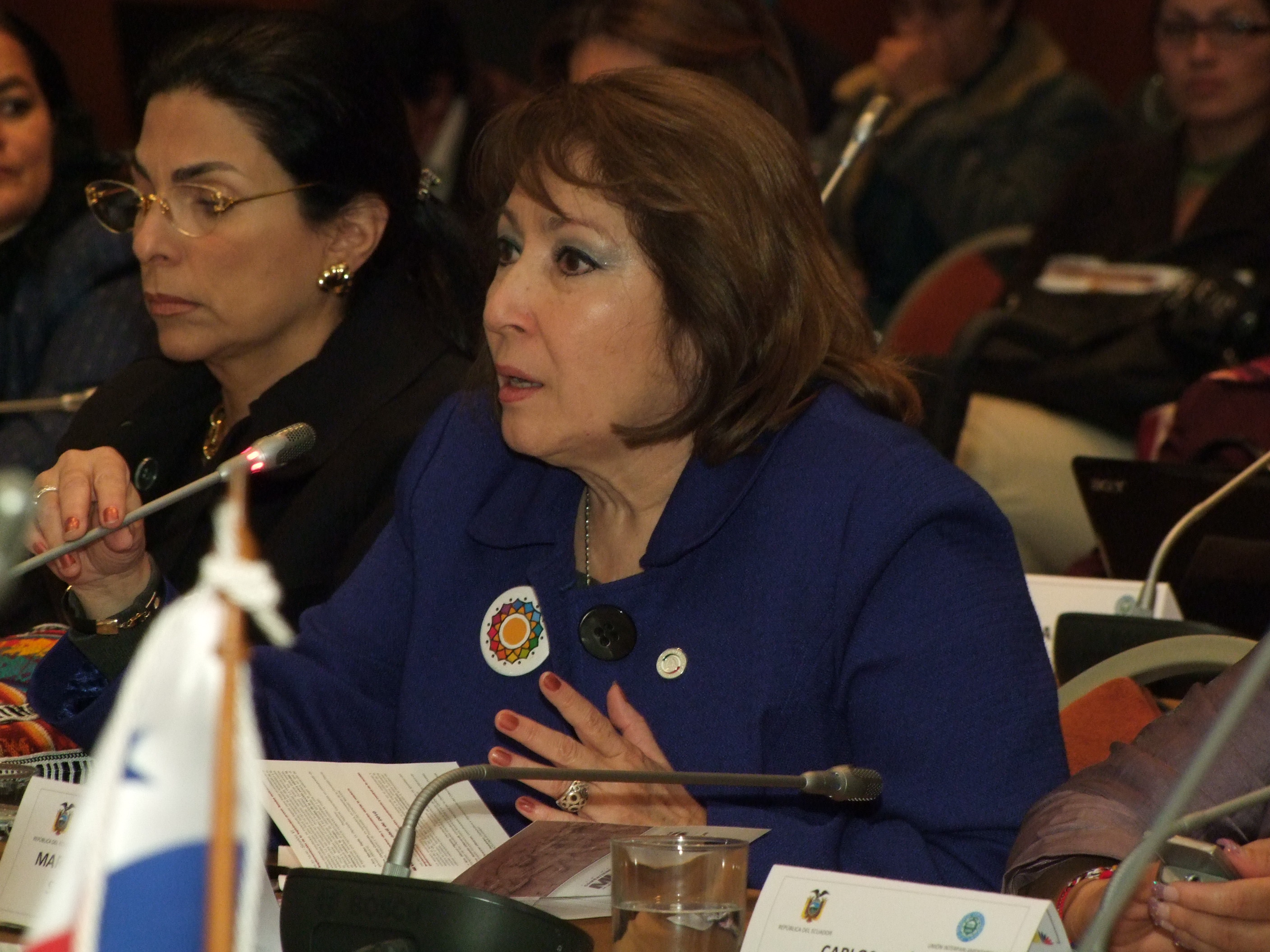

She was elected Senator for Sinaloa in the 2006 Mexican general election, succeeding Heriberto Félix Guerra in the post.

She is a graduate of University of Guadalajara.
