= Chupacabras (cycling race) =

Mountain bike race in Chihuahua, Mexico

Chupacabras is a 100 km mountain bike race in Juárez, Chihuahua, Mexico. The annual race has taken place every October since 1997. It is sponsored entirely by the private sector and draws more than three thousand competitors each year, primarily from Mexico and the southern states United States. It is named after the mythical monster Chupacabras.
