= Armando López Nogales =

Mexican politician

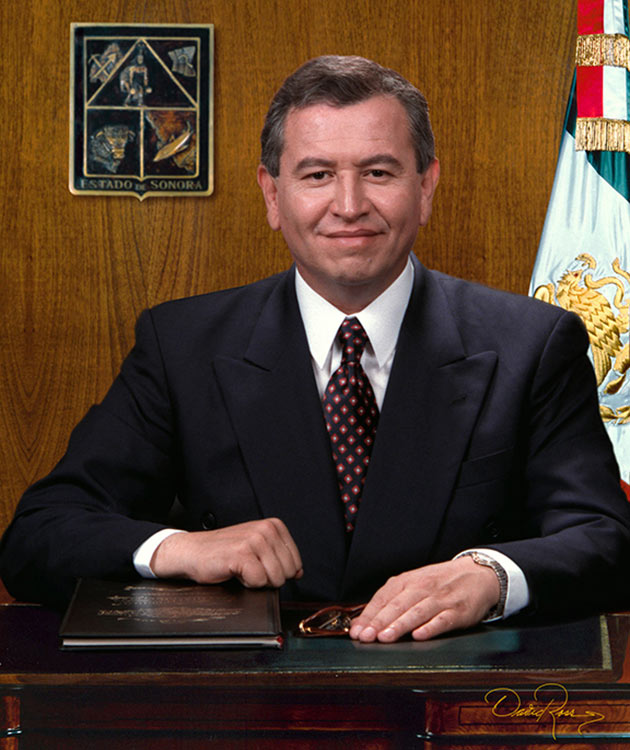

Governor of Sonora
- In office 13 September 1997 – 12 September 2003
- Preceded by: Manlio Fabio Beltrones
- Succeeded by: Eduardo Bours

Senator from Sonora
- In office 1 November 1994 – 1997
- Preceded by: Ramiro Valdés Fuentes
- Succeeded by: Héctor Larios Córdova

Undersecretary of Agrarian Reform
- In office 1992–1994

Member of the Chamber of Deputies for Sonora's 1st district
- In office 1 September 1988 – 31 October 1991

Member of the Congress of Sonora from the 5th district
- In office 1979–1982

Personal details
- Born: 1 September 1950 (age 76) Cananea, Sonora, Mexico
- Party: PRI
- Spouse: Laura Alicia Frías Careaga
- Education: Universidad de Sonora (LLB)

Armando López Nogales (born 1 September 1950) is a Mexican former lawyer and politician who was the Governor of Sonora from 1997 to 2003 as a member of the Institutional Revolutionary Party (PRI). He also served as a Senator in the LVI Legislature of the Mexican Congress representing Sonora, as well as a federal deputy in the LIV Legislature, representing Sonora's first district.

== Early life ==
Armando López Nogales was born on 1 September 1950 in Cananea, Sonora, to Rafael López Martínez and Mariana Nogales Gracia. The local miners' union, which his father was a member of, provided him with a scholarship to attend the Universidad de Sonora. He earned his law degree in 1972, writing his thesis on international reclamation, before teaching agrarian law at the same institution. He also worked as a lawyer both in Hermosillo and Mexico City.

== Political career ==
López Nogales joined the Institutional Revolutionary Party (PRI) as a teenager. From 1976 to 1977 he was the private secretary of Governor of Sonora Alejandro Carrillo Marcor. He then joined the Secretariat of Agrarian Reform, where he was the chief of the Office of Agriculture and Livestock. In 1979, he was elected to a three-year term as a local deputy in the XLIX Legislature of the Congress of Sonora. During this time he also served as the PRI secretary of political action at the state level. He was elected to the Chamber of Deputies for Sonora's first district in 1988, where he was a member of the Grand Committee and the Government and Constitutional Affairs Committee.

López Nogales returned to the Secretariat of Agrarian Reform in 1991 under President Carlos Salinas de Gortari, starting as assistant secretary of organization and agrarian development before being promoted to undersecretary of agrarian reform the following year. He was elected as a Senator for Sonora in the 1994 elections, where he served as President of the Agrarian Reform Committee. He also served as the party president at state level for a short time. He left the Senate in 1997 to run for Governor of Sonora.

=== Governor of Sonora ===
López Nogales was nominated by PRI officials as the party's candidate for Governor on 3 February 1997, and his nomination was subsequently ratified at the state party convention later that month. Even though his campaign was poorly managed and plagued with internal conflict, he was the favorite from early on. He ran with the slogan Armando juntos un mejor futuro con López Nogales (Building together a better future with López Nogales), with his first name doubling as the Spanish word for "building". His discourse during the campaign focused on local issues such as agriculture, ranching, infrastructure, public works, employment, and industry.

López Nogales polled at 43% in a predicted landslide victory right before the election according to the most prestigious survey service, Covarrubias y Asociados. His main opponents were National Action Party (PAN) candidate Enrique Salgado Bojórquez and Party of the Democratic Revolution (PRD) candidate Jesús Zambrano Grijalva. As expected, López Nogales won the race with over 40% of the vote, almost 9% ahead of the PAN and more than 18% ahead of the PRD. His six-year term saw notable improvements in health and education in Sonora, though there was also a significant increase in public debt. In 2001, he visited his hometown of Cananea and designated it the capital of the state for a day in commemoration of the city's centennial anniversary.

During his governorship, López Nogales had a controversial relationship with José Luis Hernández Salas, editor of Hermosillo-based daily newspaper El Independiente. According to the International Freedom of Expression Exchange, the governor invited Hernández Salas to dinner in Hermosillo in June 1999, where López Nogales asked him to cover his friend, PRI presidential candidate Francisco Labastida, favorably ahead of the upcoming election in exchange for financial support for the paper. After the governor was rejected by Hernández Salas, he took ahold of El Independiente three months later in September via dubious legal proceedings and "put it at the service" of Labastida's campaign. He also placed the Hernández Salas' house under police surveillance, causing him to flee to the United States in fear of his life.

After his term, López Nogales retired into private life to work his ranch in Cananea. He wrote a book about his life and government work, Mis raíces y mis años, which was published in 2019.

Political offices
Preceded by Manlio Fabio Beltrones	Governor of Sonora; 1997–2003	Next: Eduardo Bours
