= Juan Sigfrido Millán Lizárraga =

Governor of Sinaloa

Governor of Sinaloa
- In office 1 January 1999 – 31 December 2004
- Preceded by: Renato Vega Alvarado
- Succeeded by: Jesús Aguilar Padilla

Personal details
- Born: 15 June 1942 (age 84) El Rosario, Sinaloa
- Party: Institutional Revolutionary Party
- Profession: Politician

Juan Sigfrido Millán Lizárraga (15 June 1942) is a Mexican politician who was Governor of Sinaloa from 1999 to 2004. He was also state transit director, union leader of the STIRT and the CTM and senator of the republic. It was revealed that he hid $4.5 million in Andorra. He is currently retired from Sinaloa politics.
