= José Rangel Espinosa =

Mexican politician

- Born: 19 March 1956 (age 70); State of Mexico, Mexico
- Occupation: Deputy
- Political party: PRI

José Rangel Espinosa (born 19 March 1956) is a Mexican politician affiliated with the Institutional Revolutionary Party (PRI).

He was elected to the Chamber of Deputies to represent the State of Mexico's third district in both the 2003 mid-terms and the 2012 general election.
