= Emilio Chuayffet =

Mexican lawyer and politician (born 1951)

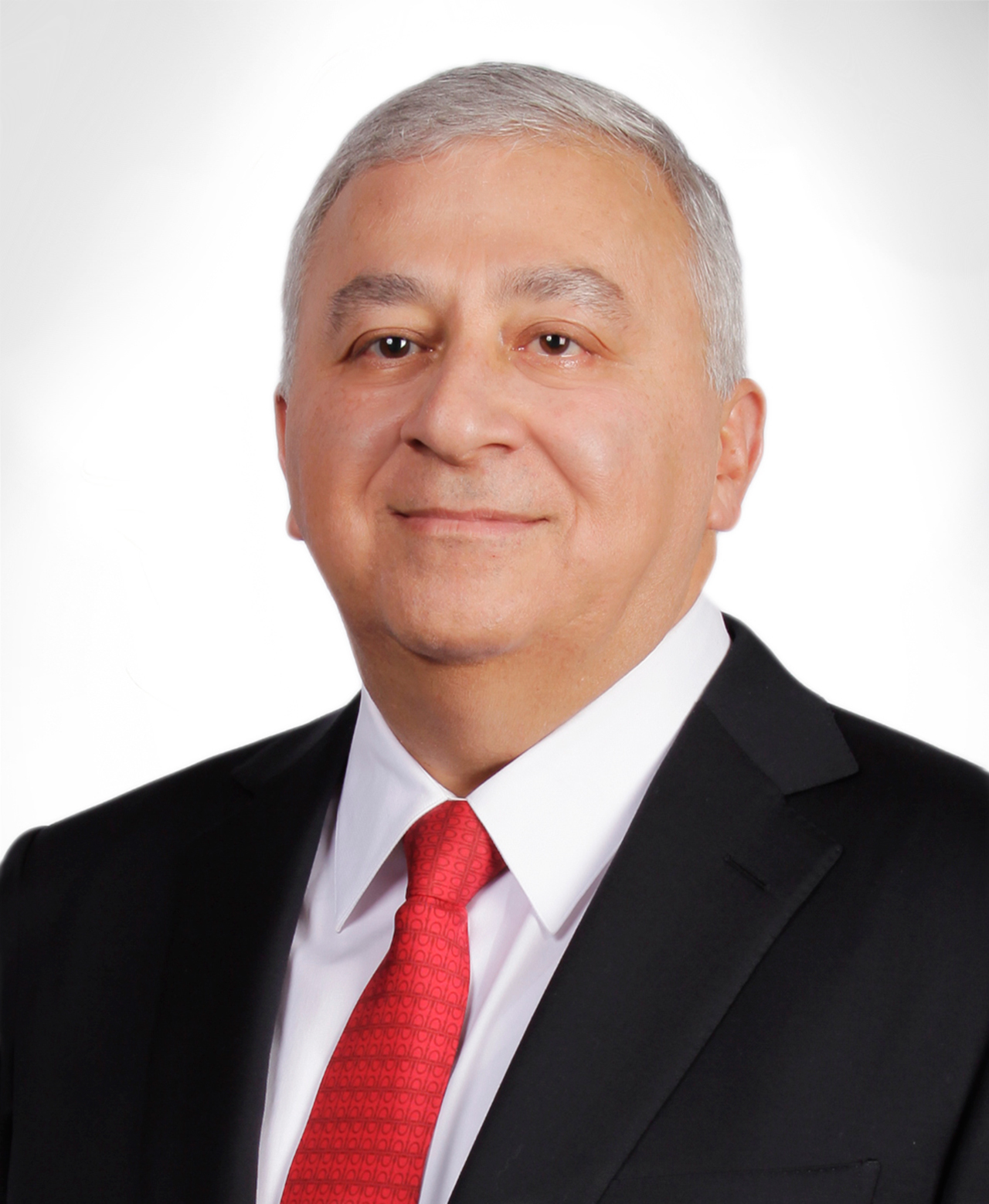
- Chuayffet in 2014

Secretary of Public Education of Mexico
- In office 1 December 2012 – 27 August 2015
- President: Enrique Peña Nieto
- Preceded by: José Ángel Córdova Villalobos
- Succeeded by: Aurelio Nuño Mayer

President of the Chamber of Deputies
- In office 1 September 2011 – 15 December 2011
- Preceded by: Jorge Carlos Ramírez Marín
- Succeeded by: Guadalupe Acosta Naranjo

Member of the Chamber of Deputies for the State of Mexico's 3rd district
- In office 1 September 2009 – 31 August 2012
- Preceded by: Óscar Cárdenas Monroy
- Succeeded by: José Rangel Espinosa

Secretary of the Interior of Mexico
- In office 28 June 1995 – 3 January 1998
- President: Ernesto Zedillo
- Preceded by: Esteban Moctezuma
- Succeeded by: Francisco Labastida

Governor of the State of Mexico
- In office 16 September 1993 – 2 July 1995
- Preceded by: Ignacio Pichardo Pagaza
- Succeeded by: César Camacho Quiroz

Personal details
- Born: 3 October 1951 (age 74) Mexico City, Mexico
- Party: Institutional Revolutionary Party
- Education: National Autonomous University of Mexico
- Profession: Lawyer

Emilio Chuayffet Chemor (born 3 October 1951) is a Mexican lawyer and politician affiliated with the Institutional Revolutionary Party (PRI) since 1969.

He previously held the office of Governor of the State of Mexico from 1993 to 1995 and Secretary of the Interior during the government of Ernesto Zedillo. He served as Secretary of Public Education under President Enrique Peña Nieto.

== Early life ==
Chuayffet was born on 3 October 1951, in Mexico City, and is of Lebanese descent.

== Political career ==
Chuayffet entered in politics in 1974 when he was appointed as borough chief of the Mexico City borough of Benito Juárez. In 1982, he was elected as Mayor of Toluca. In that same year he was appointed as Secretary of Education, Culture and Social Welfare of the State of Mexico, office that he hold until 1987.

In 1990, he was designated as head of the newly created Federal Electoral Institute.

In 1993, he was elected as Governor of the State of Mexico, taking office later on 16 September. Two years later, in 1995 he was appointed by Ernesto Zedillo as Secretary of the Interior, he resigned in 1998 following the Acteal massacre.

In 2003, he was elected to the Chamber of Deputies for the 59th Congress as a plurinominal deputy. He was reelected to the Chamber in 2009 for the 61st Congress for the State of Mexico's third district and from 1 September to 15 December 2011 he served as President of the Directive Board.

On 1 December 2012, he was appointed Secretary of Public Education.

On 27 August 2015, President Enrique Peña Nieto named Aurelio Nuño to replace Emilio Chuayffet as Secretary of Public Education. Ill health following a gall bladder removal was speculated as the cause, since no explanation was offered.

Preceded by José Ángel Córdova Villalobos	Secretary of Public Education; 2012 — Present	Succeeded by Incumbent

Preceded by Ignacio Pichardo Pagaza	Governor of the State of Mexico; 1993 — 1995	Succeeded by César Camacho Quiroz
