= Horacio Sánchez Unzueta =

Mexican lawyer, diplomat and politician (1949–2024)

Governor of San Luis Potosí
- In office 18 May 1993 – 25 September 1997
- Preceded by: Teófilo Torres Corzo
- Succeeded by: Fernando Silva Nieto

Member of the Chamber of Deputies of Mexico
- In office 1 November 1991 – 21 December 1992
- Preceded by: Antonio Sánchez Morales
- Succeeded by: Manuel Medellín Milán
- Constituency: San Luis Potosí's 6th

Personal details
- Born: 17 April 1949; San Luis Potosí, SLP, Mexico
- Died: 5 February 2024 (aged 74); San Luis Potosí, SLP, Mexico
- Political party: PRI
- Education: Autonomous University of San Luis Potosí
- Occupation: Lawyer; Diplomat

Horacio Sánchez Unzueta (17 April 1949 – 5 February 2024) was a Mexican lawyer, diplomat and politician. A member of the Institutional Revolutionary Party, he served in the Chamber of Deputies from 1991 to 1992, representing San Luis Potosí's 6th district and was governor of San Luis Potosí from 1993 to 1997.

Sánchez died in the city of San Luis Potosí on 5 February 2024, at the age of 74.
