= Diódoro Carrasco Altamirano =

Mexican economist and politician

Secretary of the Interior
- In office 21 May 1999 – 30 November 2000
- President: Ernesto Zedillo
- Preceded by: Francisco Labastida
- Succeeded by: Santiago Creel

Governor of Oaxaca
- In office 1 December 1992 – 30 November 1998
- Preceded by: Heladio Ramírez
- Succeeded by: José Murat

Personal details
- Born: 30 January 1954 (age 72) San Juan Bautista Cuicatlán, Oaxaca, Mexico
- Party: National Action Party (2006–present); Institutional Revolutionary Party (1972–2006)
- Spouse: Clara Scherer Castillo
- Profession: Politician

Diódoro Humberto Carrasco Altamirano (born 30 January 1954) is a Mexican economist and politician from the National Action Party (formerly from the Institutional Revolutionary Party) who served as governor of Oaxaca from 1992 to 1998 and as secretary of the interior during the last year of Ernesto Zedillo's government.

He also served as a senator during the 55th Congress (1991–1994) and as a plurinominal deputy during the 60th Congress (2006–2009).

Preceded by Heladio Ramírez	Governor of Oaxaca; 1992–1998	Succeeded by José Murat

Preceded by Francisco Labastida Ochoa	Secretary of the Interior; 1999–2000	Succeeded by Santiago Creel
