= Julia Carabias Lillo =

Mexican professor

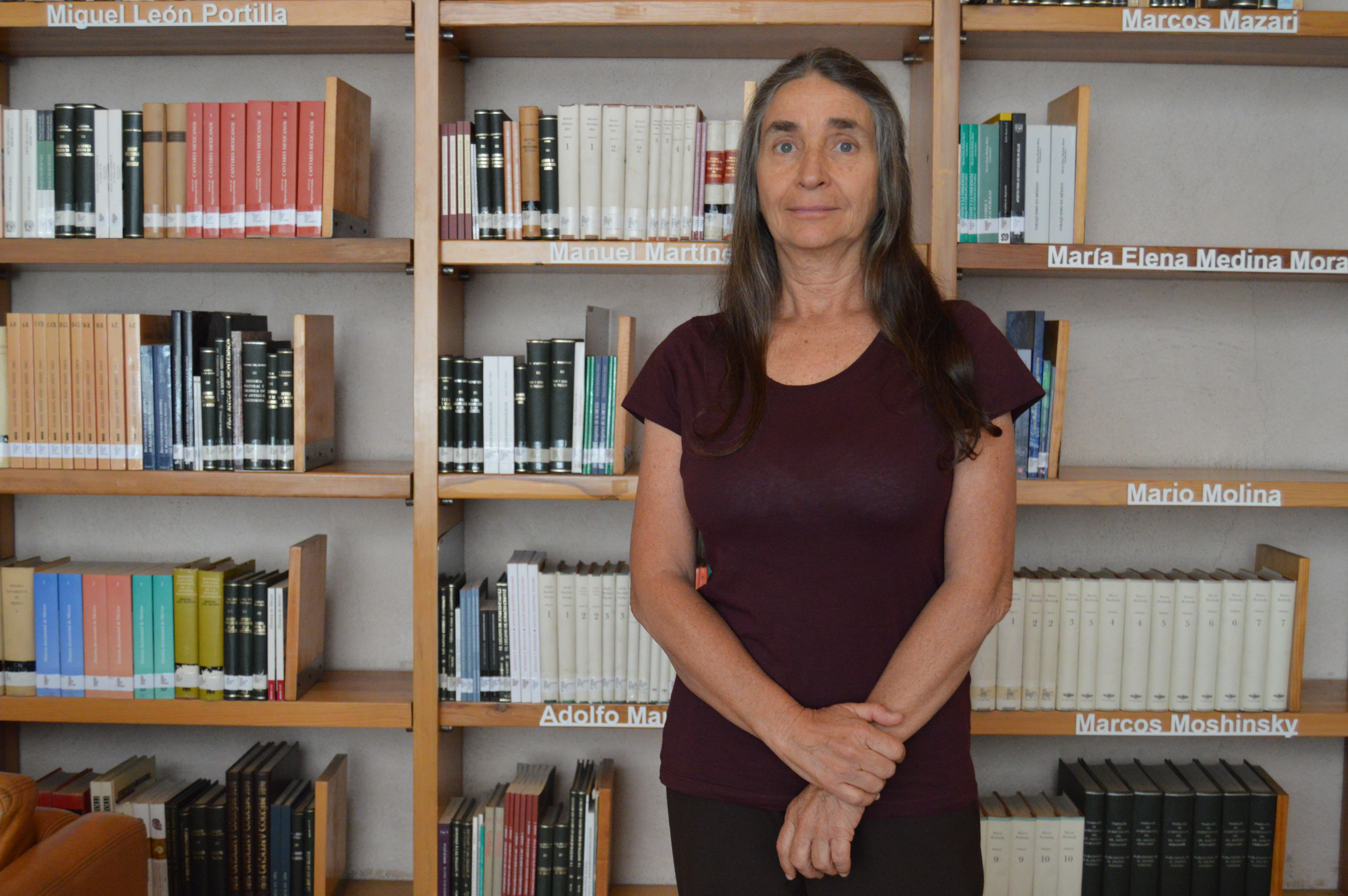
- Born: August 11, 1954 (age 72); Mexico City, Mexico
- Education: National Autonomous University of Mexico, BS (1977) and MS (1981)
- Known for: Environmental conservation, former Secretariat of Environment and Natural Resources
- Spouse: José Woldenberg (divorced)
- Awards: J. Paul Getty Award for Conservation Leadership International Cosmos Prize Champions of the Earth Belisario Domínguez Medal of Honor
- Scientific career
- Fields: Ecology and Environmental Conservation
- Workplaces: National Autonomous University of Mexico Secretariat of Environment and Natural Resources

Julia Carabias Lillo (born August 11, 1954, Mexico City) is a Mexican ecologist and Environmental Conservationist. She is a professor at the National Autonomous University of Mexico and served as the Secretariat of Environment and Natural Resources under President Ernesto Zedillo from 1994 to 2000.

== Early life and education ==
Carabias was born in Mexico City on August 11, 1954, as the child of Basque immigrants from Spain. As a child, she witnessed the difficulties that came with living in a developing country. She told The Japan Times that these early childhood observations informed her interest in alleviating poverty and conserving the environment. She later went on to receive her Bachelor of Science in 1977 and Master of Science in 1981 in biology from National Autonomous University of Mexico.

== Research & public service ==
In 1977, Carabias joined the faculty at the National Autonomous University of Mexico (UNAM), where she taught and researched until 1994, developing programs that focused on Botany, Ecology, Natural Resource Management, Ecological Restoration, and Conservation. There, her research centered on strategies to regenerate tropical forests and the use of natural resources. Between 1989 and 1993, Carabias served on the UNAM University Council. She left the university between 1994 and 2000 to serve in the Ernesto Zedillo administration and returned to the university in 2001.

=== Early public service ===
Given her research interests directly intersect with public policy, she has drawn the attention of government officials. In 1982, she was asked by the Governor of Guerrero—one of Mexico's poorest states and one highly impacted by environmental destruction—to develop a plan to improve local standards of living, while conserving natural resources in the area. She worked with a team of economists and ecologists to devise a four-year program, called the Rural Research and Development Program for the Integral Use of Natural Resources (PAIR), that gained international recognition as a standard for developing countries to follow. PAIR was subsequently adapted for four other Mexican states between 1984 and 1994, at the request of the President. Each plan had to be adapted to the distinct climates of each state, which varied from dry tropical forest, tropical rain forest, temperate forest, and desert. She documented some of these efforts in the book Rural Production in Mexico: Ecological Alternatives, published in 1989. Carabias is the author of many scientific articles on botany, ecology, natural resource management, ecological restoration, and conservation. In addition to Rural Production in Mexico: Ecological Alternatives, she is also the co-author of Ecology and Alimentary Self-Sufficiency and Natural Resource Management and Rural Poverty. In 2005, she was named one of the United Nations seven Champions of the Earth, which in part recognized her leadership of the PAIR program.

In 1992, Carabias was on the team that published the report For Earth's Sake during the United Nations sponsored Conference on the Environment and Development in Brazil. The report was commissioned by the Commission on Developing Countries and Global Change and centers on the southern hemisphere's perspective on the intersection between environment and global development. Carabias and her collaborators conclude by proposing equitable approaches to sustainable development and a research agenda to enable those approaches.

=== Service in the Zedillo Administration ===
Carabias officially entered government service in 1994, acting as President of Mexico’s National Institute of Ecology and joined the advisory council of the National Conservation Fund. On December 1, 1994, she became the Secretariat of Environment and Natural Resources, serving in the cabinet of former Mexican President Ernesto Zedillo until the end of his term in 2000. During her tenure, she worked on a number of environmental conservation and restoration projects. She responded to forest fires that devastated the Chimalapas biological reserve in the southern states of Chiapas and Oaxaca. She worked to pass a number of fire-control regulations, including a new forest law in 1997 and a wildlife law in 2000, working to build consensus between rural communities and legislators. People who wished to burn were required to submit a form ten days in advance that specified the time, location and size of burn, and who would be in attendance to ensure that the right protections were put in place in advance. She also doubled the region of Mexico's protected areas to more than six percent, which had the effect of safeguarding species like the gray whale (Eschrichtius robustus), the pronghorn (Antilocapra americana) of Baja California, the manatee (Trichechus manatus), and the jaguar (Panthera onca) of Yucatán. In particular, she worked with former United States Secretary of the Interior Bruce Babbitt, focusing on land and resource management of deserts along the US-Mexico border. In addition, she coordinated Mexican and American officials to work on restoring the natural course of river flow along the border between the two countries. She also helped incorporate sustainable development into Mexico's National Development Plan, adding environmental considerations into economic planning.

=== Post-political career ===
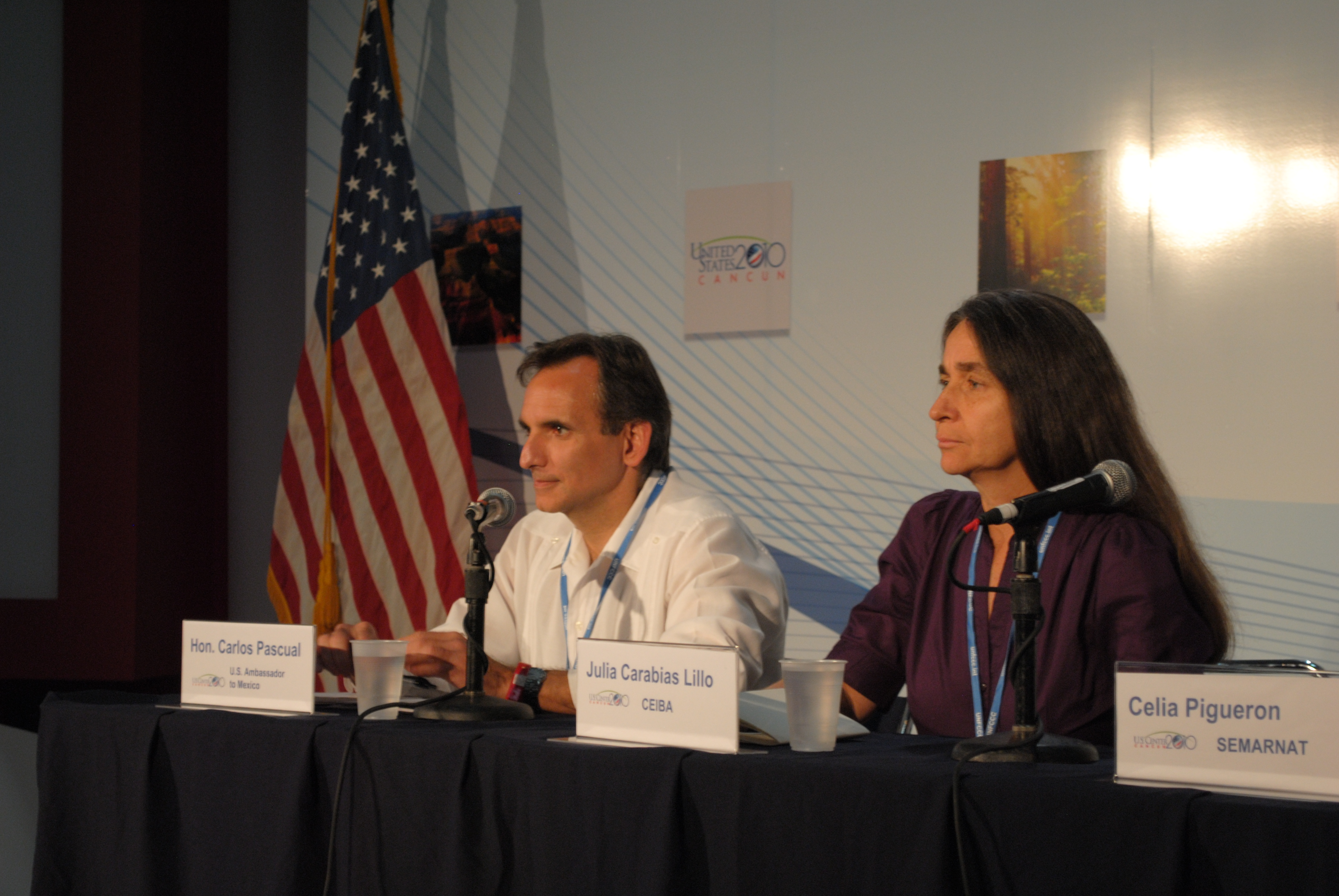
U.S. Ambassador to Mexico Carlos Pascual and CEIBA's Julia Carabias Lillo listen to a question from the audience at the U.S. Center at COP-16 in Cancun, Mexico, on December 8, 2010.

Carabias returned to UNAM in 2001, re-joining the Faculty of Science. There, she coordinates the Master's degree program in Restoration Ecology and has resumed her research projects related to conservation, restoration, and management of the tropical rain forest of the Selva Lacandona, Chiapas. During the same year, the World Wildlife Fund (WWF) awarded her the J. Paul Getty Wildlife Conservation Prize. Carabias donated the cash portion of it equaling $100,000 to the protection of the Chajul region of southern Mexico's Lacandon forests. Carabias served on the board of directors of Resources for the Future, an international environmental research organization between 2001 and 2004. Between 2002 and 2004, Carabias served as the Chair of the Scientific and Technical Advisory Panel, an independent advisory body established by the United Nations Global Environment Facility (GEF). In 2004, she established the training center for biodiversity in the Lacandon region in Chiapas. Carabias was awarded The International Cosmos Prize in 2004 and in 2005 she received the United Nations Environmental Programme Champions of the Earth Prize. In 2017, Carabias was awarded the Mexican Belisario Domínguez medal, a recognition granted by Mexico's Senate to recognize outstanding citizens for their service to the country and humanity. In 2020, she joined the Tyler Prize for Environmental Achievement as a member of the Executive Committee, responsible for selecting recipients of the Prize. From 2001 to 2014, she served as the president of the Biodiversity and Environmental Interdisciplinary Center (CEIBA, Centro Interdisciplinario de Biodiversidad y Ambiente, A.C.), a nongovernmental organization dedicated to bringing together researchers and specialists to promote the analysis, design, and implementation of public policies around conservation.

==== Controversies ====
On 1 February 2022, former president Andrés Manuel López Obrador pointed out that the permits granted to Vulcan Materials Company to exploit the Calica quarry in Quintana Roo were issued on Carabias' last day as Secretary of Environment and Natural Resources. The company has been accused of the overexploitation and eventual devastation of about 400 to 500 hectares (4.0 to 5.0 km^{2}) of the national territory, including deforestation and the destruction of cenotes and the water table.

On 5 October, the ex-secretary replied in a public letter to the former president and accused him of defamation. She argued that permits were granted with numerous and demanding conditions and that it was not her responsibility if said conditions were not monitored and/or enforced by her successors.

== Awards & honors ==
- J. Paul Getty Award for Conservation Leadership, 2000
- International Cosmos Prize, 2004
- Champions of the Earth, United Nations, 2005
- Honorary Doctorate, Universidad Autónoma de Nuevo León, 2013
- Belisario Domínguez Medal of Honor, 2017
- Member, El Colegio Nacional (Mexico), 2018
