= Francisco Labastida =

Mexican politician

Senator for Sinaloa
- In office 1 September 2006 – 31 August 2012
- Preceded by: José Adalberto Castro Castro
- Succeeded by: Daniel Amador Gaxiola

Secretary of the Interior of Mexico
- In office 3 January 1998 – 21 May 1999
- President: Ernesto Zedillo
- Preceded by: Emilio Chuayffet
- Succeeded by: Diódoro Carrasco Altamirano

Governor of Sinaloa
- In office 1 January 1987 – 31 December 1992
- Preceded by: Antonio Toledo Corro
- Succeeded by: Renato Vega Alvarado

Personal details
- Born: Francisco Labastida Ochoa; 14 August 1942 (age 84) Los Mochis, Sinaloa, Mexico
- Party: Institutional Revolutionary Party
- Spouse: María Teresa Uriarte (m. 1977)

Francisco Labastida Ochoa (Spanish pronunciation: [fɾanˈsisko laβasˈtiða]; born 14 August 1942) is a Mexican economist and politician affiliated with the Institutional Revolutionary Party (PRI), who became the first presidential candidate of his party to lose a presidential election, which he did in the 2000 presidential election to Vicente Fox.

Labastida was born to Gloria Ochoa de Labastida and Eduardo Labastida Kofahl. His wife, Teresa Uriarte, was director of UNAM's Institute of Aesthetics Research. His great-grandfather fought on the side of Mexican President Benito Juárez in the War of Reform, and his grandfather was Governor of Sinaloa as well as federal deputy.

Labastida served as governor of Sinaloa (1987–1992), defeating Manuel Clouthier of the National Action Party. During and after his tenure as governor, Labastida was accused of protecting Sinaloan drug traffickers and overlooking their activities.

Labastida was Secretary of Energy during the administration of Miguel de la Madrid. He was also Secretary of Agriculture and Secretary of the Interior during the administration of Ernesto Zedillo.

After losing the 2000 presidential election, he served as president of the Centro de Estudios para el Desarrollo de México. In the 2006 general election, he was elected to the Senate for the PRI, representing Sinaloa.

== Publications ==
- Las Razones de la Política
- Planeación para el Desarrollo

== Awards ==
- National Order of Merit Grand Officer, of the government of France
- Great Cross of Brazil
- Medal of the Mexican Supreme Court

Senate of the Republic (Mexico)
Preceded by José Adalberto Castro (PRI); Martha Sofía Tamayo (PRI); Joaquín Montaño (PAN)	Senator for Sinaloa in the LX and LXI Legislature of the Mexican Congress (serving with Mario López Valdéz (PRI) and María Serrano Serrano (PAN); 2006 - 2012	Succeeded by incumbent
Party political offices
Preceded by Ernesto Zedillo	PRI presidential candidate 2000 (lost)	Succeeded by Roberto Madrazo
Political offices
Preceded by Emilio Chuayffet	Secretary of the Interior; 1998—1999	Succeeded by Diódoro Carrasco
Preceded by Antonio Toledo Corro	Governor of Sinaloa; 1987—1993	Succeeded by Renato Vega Alvarado
