= Carlos Rojas Gutiérrez =

Mexican politician (1954–2024)

- Born: 14 November 1954; Mexico City, Mexico
- Died: 17 January 2024 (aged 69); Mexico City, Mexico
- Occupation: Politician
- Political party: PRI

Carlos Rojas Gutiérrez (14 November 1954 – 17 January 2024) was a Mexican politician affiliated with the Institutional Revolutionary Party (PRI). He was elected to the Senate for the LVIII and LIX Legislatures (2000–2003 and 2003–2006), and to the Chamber of Deputies for the LX Legislature (2006–2009). He also served as Secretary of Social Development from 1993 to 1998 and as general secretary of the PRI from 1997 to 1999. He was the brother of Francisco Rojas Gutiérrez, who served as the director of both Petróleos Mexicanos (PEMEX) and the Federal Electricity Commission (CFE).

Rojas Gutiérrez died in Mexico City on 17 January 2024, at the age of 69. He was survived by his widow, Senator Mónica Fernández Balboa.
