= Óscar Espinosa Villarreal =

Mayor of Mexico City from 1994 to 1997

Óscar Espinosa Villarreal (born 23 November 1953) is a Mexican former politician who served as the last Regent of Mexico City from 1994 to 1997 and Mexico's Secretary of Tourism from 1997 to 2000. In March 2000, he was accused of embezzling 420 million pesos from the city treasury by approving large financial transfers to an aide. In August, he resigned as Secretary of Tourism and disappeared. In November, he fled to Nicaragua seeking political asylum. However, he was extradited back to Mexico in August 2001. In 2005, he was sentenced to prison for 7½ years for embezzlement, as well as misuse of public funds as Secretary of Tourism.

== Career ==
=== Regent of Mexico City ===
Espinosa is a member of the Institutional Revolutionary Party (PRI). In 1994, Mexican President and PRI member Ernesto Zedillo appointed Espinosa to be the Regent of Mexico City; Espinosa was the chief fundraiser for Zedillo's 1994 presidential campaign. Mexico City's mayor was appointed by the president until 1997. In 1997, Espinosa was succeeded by Cuauhtémoc Cárdenas of the Party of the Democratic Revolution (PRD). Espinosa's administration "[left] so many bugging devices [in the city government offices that] Cárdenas immediately vacated the premises and set up camp in a separate building". The Cárdenas administration began an investigation into irregularities in the city's finances under Espinosa. They found he had embezzled hundreds of millions of pesos by approving large financial transfers from the city treasury to multiple aides — some of whom would be charged for other crimes by 2000 — as well as journalists covering the mayorship. The PRI, which controlled the presidency for seven decades until 2000, often engaged in corruption.

=== Secretary of Tourism ===
In December 1997, Zedillo appointed Espinosa as Mexico's Secretary of Tourism, an office which protects its holder from criminal prosecution. In July 1999, a financier of Zedillo's 1994 campaign, Carlos Cabal Peniche, said PRI officials including Espinosa conspired with him (Cabal) to give US$4 million in illegal donations to the campaign. Espinosa said he met with Cabal to solicit donations but that no illegal conspiring occurred; while defending himself, Espinosa falsely insisted the National Committee for Financing and Patrimony Strengthening — to which Cabal had made the illegal donations — was a private organization.

In March 2000, Cárdenas's embezzlement investigation led to formal accusations, as Mexico City's attorney general Samuel del Villar filed a request with Congress to remove Espinosa from his position as secretary of tourism, accusing him of embezzling 420 million pesos by transferring them to an aide. This happened during the 2000 presidential election campaign season. Espinosa, Zedillo, and the PRI's presidential candidate, Francisco Labastida, said the accusation was "timed to hurt the PRI during an election year". Espinosa claimed the irregularities were the result of poor paperwork.

=== Jail, extradition, and trial ===
On 8 August 2000, Espinosa's office issued a statement that he had resigned as Secretary of Tourism and would fight the legal charges against him; however, on 3 August, he had secretly left Mexico without saying where he was going. After the statement was issued, the Mexico City attorney general's office requested his detention through Interpol. Espinosa then showed up in Toronto, Canada, and on 12 August, he fled Toronto to Nicaragua, seeking political asylum.

In July 2000, Labastida lost the presidential election to Vicente Fox. Fox planned to prosecute Espinosa as part of a corruption purge against PRI officials. In December, Nicaragua placed Espinosa in jail and planned to extradite him back to Mexico, on request of Fox's foreign ministry. The request was privately supported by Zedillo. This made Espinosa "the first sitting Cabinet official in Mexico ever formally threatened with arrest".

Nicaragua extradited Espinosa back to Mexico City in August 2001. Upon returning, he paid a US$470,000 bail and was charged with embezzlement, as well as misuse of public funds while he was Secretary of Tourism. This made him the highest-ranking Mexican official to be charged with corruption at the time. In June 2005, Espinosa was sentenced to 7½ years in prison and ordered to pay US$26 million in reparations.

== See also ==
- List of mayors of Mexico City
