= César Camacho Quiroz =

Mexican lawyer and politician

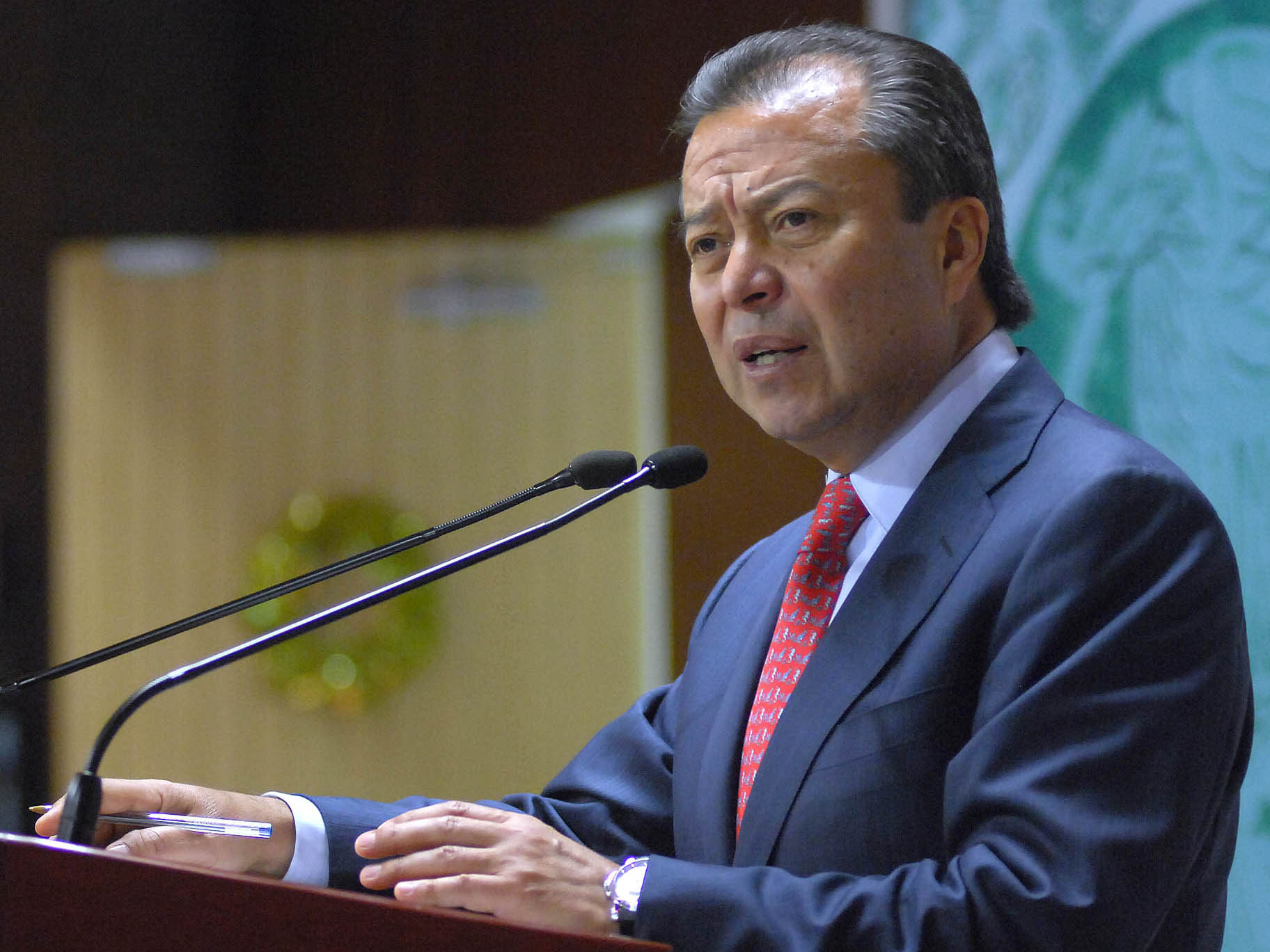
- César Camacho in 2015

Member of the Senate for the State of Mexico
- In office 1 September 2000 – 31 August 2006
- Preceded by: Luis Felipe Bravo Mena
- Succeeded by: Ulises Ramírez Núñez

Governor of the State of Mexico
- In office 2 July 1995 – 15 September 1999
- Preceded by: Emilio Chuayffet
- Succeeded by: Arturo Montiel Rojas

President of the Institutional Revolutionary Party
- In office 11 December 2012 – 11 August 2015
- Preceded by: Cristina Díaz Salazar
- Succeeded by: Manlio Fabio Beltrones

Personal details
- Born: 14 February 1959 (age 67) Metepec, State of Mexico, Mexico
- Party: Institutional Revolutionary Party
- Occupation: Lawyer and politician

César Octavio Camacho Quiroz (born 14 February 1959) is a Mexican lawyer and politician affiliated with the Institutional Revolutionary Party. He served as Governor of the State of Mexico between 1995 and 1999, as Senator of the LVIII and LIX Legislatures of the Mexican Congress, and as Deputy of the LX and LXIII Legislatures, all representing the State of Mexico, and as president of the PRI between 2012 and 2015.

== Life ==
Camacho Quiroz was born on 14 February 1959 in Metepec, State of Mexico. He was raised in a PRI family; his father served on the municipal council from 1973 to 1975, and his house frequently hosted dinners with PRI party members. In 1980, he graduated with a degree in law from the Universidad Autónoma del Estado de México. He then went to work at the law office of Riva Palacio for a year, leaving that post to enter public administration in the state government. From 1985 to 1987, he taught at various schools, including the UAEM, Universidad Anáhuac del Norte, UNAM, and at Tec de Monterrey, Campus Toluca.

In 1979, Camacho Quiroz began to get involved with the PRI. In 1979, he became the state-level executive coordinator of the National Revolutionary Youth Movement, a PRI organ, and in 1982, he was named Subsecretary of Ideological Dissemination for the party. Three years later, Camacho Quiroz was tapped to become the Secretary of Social Action. At the same time, he became a member of the Public Administration Institute of the State of Mexico (IAPEM).

1987 saw Camacho Quiroz become deputy director of government for the State of Mexico. From 1991 to 1993, he served as the municipal president of Metepec, a position he resigned to become the secretary general of the state government. While in this position, he negotiated during such events as prison riots in Almoloya de Juárez and protests blocking highways in Atenco.

=== As governor ===
In 1995, Emilio Chuayffet, the Governor of the State of Mexico, was tapped to become the new Secretary of the Interior. As a result, Camacho Quiroz was appointed by the state legislature to fill the remaining four years of Chuayffet's term.

While governor, Camacho Quiroz was criticized for his youth — at the time of his appointment, he was only 36 — and for largely following the orders of Chuayffet. The PRD criticized him for allegedly organizing conflict groups against PRD-friendly municipal governments in Texcoco and Ciudad Nezahualcóyotl.

=== Becoming a senator ===
The PRI ran Camacho Quiroz for senator from the State of Mexico in 2000, and he was elected to the LVIII and LIX Legislatures. He was the president of the Federalism and Municipal Development Commission and served on an array of other committees, including Foreign Relations for Europe and Africa, and special commissions formed to investigate the problems facing teachers in Yucatán and to mediate disputes between Colima and Jalisco.

During this time, he wrote the weekly column "Los dichos y los hechos" and contributed to the El Economista newspaper; he also has released several books on political and legal topics. Camacho Quiroz also continued his participation in the PRI, serving in various secretarial positions.

=== First term in the Chamber of Deputies ===
Camacho Quiroz was elected as a proportional representation deputy from the PRI party list in the fifth region in 2006. He presided over the Justice Commission and served on the Government and Foreign Relations commissions.

In 2010, he was tapped to be general coordinator for celebrations of the bicentennial of Mexican independence and the centennial anniversary of the Mexican Revolution. He then headed the Fundación Luis Donaldo Colosio.

=== Heading the PRI ===
With the resignation of Pedro Joaquín Coldwell from the PRI presidency to become Secretary of Energy, Camacho Quiroz was unanimously elected to become the new president of the PRI on December 11, 2012. In this capacity, he served on the Guiding Council of the Pacto por México (2013–14) and was considered one of its key defenders.

=== Return to San Lázaro ===
In 2015, with his term as PRI president over, Camacho Quiroz ran for the Chamber of Deputies again and won. He currently serves as the PRI's party coordinator in the chamber.

In 2016, the Chamber of Deputies selected Camacho Quiroz as one of its designees to the Constituent Assembly of Mexico City and will serve as the coordinator of the PRI faction in the assembly.
