= Roberto Madrazo =

Mexican politician

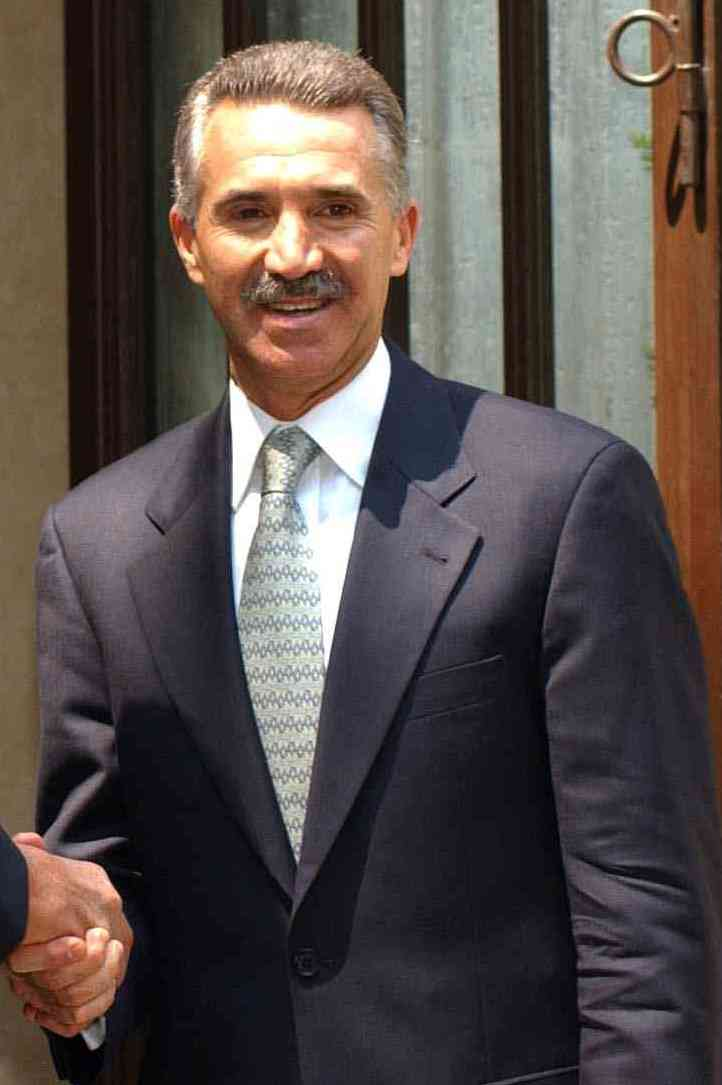
- Madrazo in 2004

Governor of Tabasco
- In office January 1, 1995 – December 31, 2000
- Preceded by: Víctor Manuel Barceló
- Succeeded by: Enrique Priego Oropeza

Deputy of the Congress of the Union for Tabasco's 1st district
- In office 1991–1994

Deputy of the Congress of the Union for Tabasco's 2nd district
- In office September 1, 1976 – August 31, 1979
- Preceded by: Humberto Hernández Haddad
- Succeeded by: Ángel Mario Martínez Zentella

Personal details
- Born: Roberto Madrazo Pintado; July 30, 1952 (age 74) Villahermosa, Tabasco, Mexico
- Party: Institutional Revolutionary Party
- Spouse: Isabel de la Parra (m. 1982)
- Education: National Autonomous University of Mexico; University of California at Los Angeles

Roberto Madrazo Pintado (born July 30, 1952) is a Mexican politician and member of the Institutional Revolutionary Party. He was the candidate of the alliance between his party and the Ecologist Green Party of Mexico (PVEM) in the 2006 Mexican presidential election. He served as Governor of Tabasco from 1995 to 2000.

== Early years ==
Madrazo was born in Villahermosa, Tabasco, to Carlos A. Madrazo and Graciela Pintado Jiménez. His father was a reformist politician at a time when the PRI was the only viable party. Both of his parents died in a plane crash when he was sixteen. Although his father came from humble roots, his prestige allowed Roberto to become one of Mexico's elite. He studied law at the National Autonomous University of Mexico in Mexico City and urbanism at the University of California at Los Angeles, and headed the PRI Youth.

== Early political career ==
Between 1976 and 1988, he represented Tabasco in both the Chamber of Deputies and the Senate. He served as governor of Tabasco from 1994 to 2000. As governor, Madrazo acquired a reputation as a populist politician who promoted economic development.

== 2000 presidential election ==
Madrazo sought the PRI's presidential candidacy in 2000 but lost to Francisco Labastida, a former governor of Sinaloa and former Secretary of the Interior in the cabinet of President Ernesto Zedillo, whom Madrazo perceived as having chosen Labastida as his successor in the Mexican political tradition of the dedazo ("the finger", referring to hand-chosen presidential succession). As a candidate, Madrazo was described as having "populist flair".

The PRI had never lost a presidential election since its founding, and the party's structure made the president the arbiter of its internal affairs. Although this was not the first time in PRI's history the presidential authority was defied, Madrazo's anti-dedazo campaign was particularly aggressive. He even used a pun on his surname: "Dale un Madrazo al dedazo" (a "madrazo" is vulgar term for a severe blow in Mexican Spanish; loosely translated, give a blow to the dedazo) as a promise to end the corrupt tradition. He attracted some followers inside the PRI but the primary, which, in an unprecedented turn of events, was open to registered voters and not just PRI members, favored Labastida.

Madrazo accepted the outcome, but his aggressive internal campaign had weakened Labastida's candidacy in the eyes of the electorate, and was seen as a major factor in his defeat by the National Action Party (PAN) candidate Vicente Fox Quesada.

After the historical loss of the presidential election in 2000, the PRI was faced an uncertain future. Madrazo, however, as party leader, was able to parlay the party's strong infrastructure and history into electoral victories, particularly in his home state of Tabasco, which helped avoid internecine troubles.

== PRI presidency ==
Madrazo is mainly credited for bringing cohesion to a disjointed PRI after it historically lost the 2000 presidential election. Madrazo was able to wrestle control of the PRI by negotiating deals with different power groups within the PRI and by neutralizing political adversaries within the party.

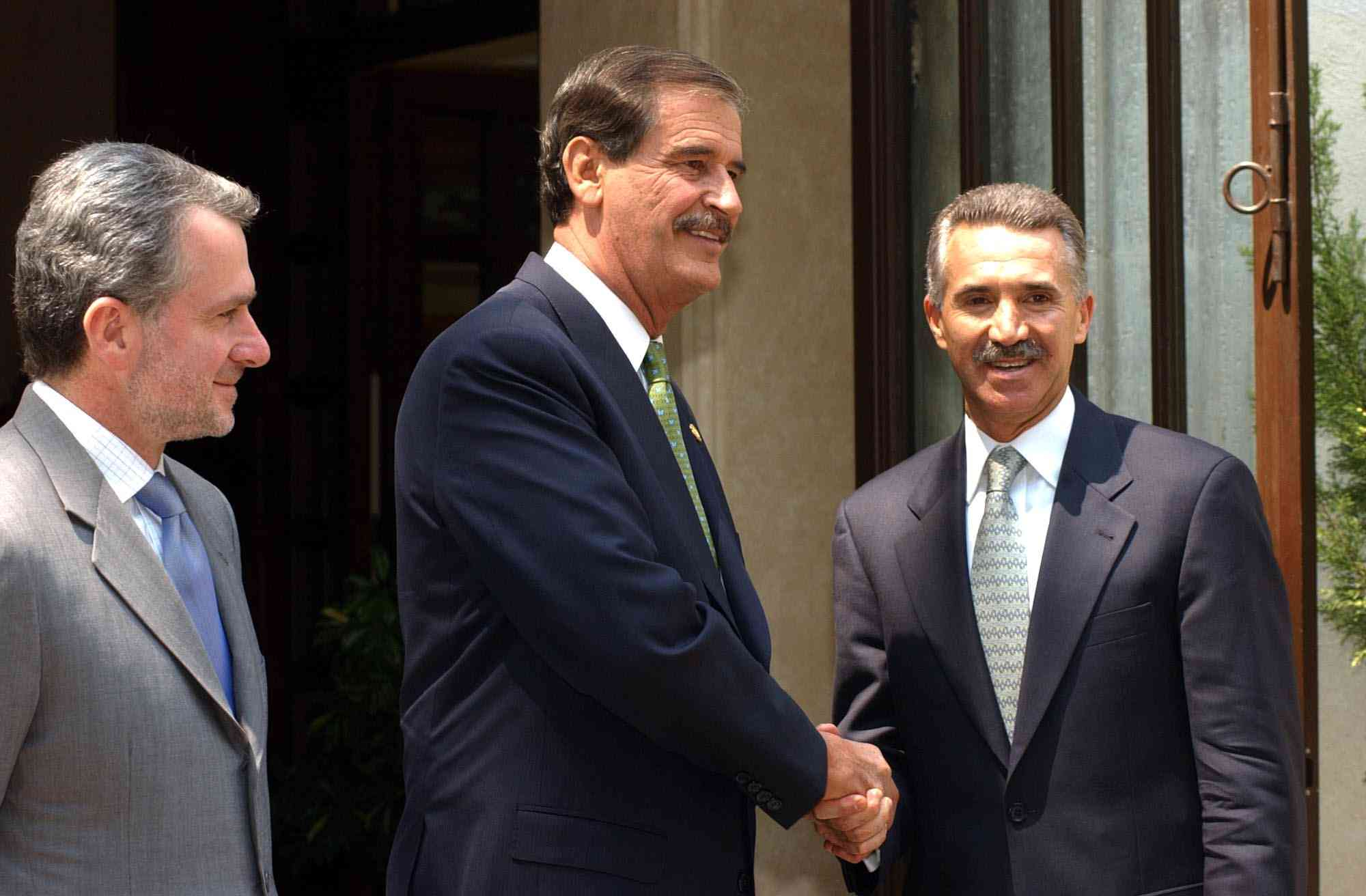
Santiago Creel (left), President Vicente Fox and Roberto Madrazo (right).

Madrazo ran for the presidency of the PRI in 2002, allying himself with Elba Esther Gordillo (as his general secretary), the powerful leader of the National Education Workers' Union. Together, they defeated their adversary, Senator Beatriz Paredes in a close election. After the election, Gordillo became his political rival, resulting in her retirement from public life for a year amidst many verbal accusations (she was accused of murdering members of her labor-based opposition and conspiring against PRI members). In early 2005, Gordillo returned to the political scene and broke publicly with Madrazo.

== 2006 presidential campaign ==
Madrazo's position as national leader of the PRI gave him a considerable advantage in his campaign for the 2006 presidential candidacy. As the election neared, there had been a growing discomfort among other would-be PRI candidates, who increasingly demanded that clear rules for the internal campaign be set. Many PRI-affiliated state governors formed the group Democratic Unity, nicknamed TUCOM (Todos Unidos Contra Madrazo, "All United Against Madrazo") in the media. They chose Arturo Montiel as their pre-candidate. In the primary elections, Madrazo, Montiel, and a third contender, Everardo Moreno Cruz, competed for the candidacy. Montiel resigned after legal issues concerning mansions in Mexico and France (his wife is a French citizen); his sons were also implicated in embezzlement schemes. Montiel's resignation resulted in Madrazo's candidacy, although minimal participation on the part of the PRI votership may have indicated a lack of faith in the PRI or a general disinterest. He was also accused by political rivals of tax evasion.

After the primaries, Madrazo forged an alliance with the PVEM, and earned the party's nomination. Madrazo faced a battle against Andrés Manuel López Obrador, the former Head of Government of the Federal District and PRD presidential candidate. López Obrador was something of a personal rival, having previously lost to Madrazo in the election for the Tabasco governorship in 1994. Another contestant was the right-of-center PAN candidate Felipe Calderón.

The public debate between Madrazo and Gordillo resulted in the creation of a new political party, the Partido Nueva Alianza, formed to oppose Madrazo in his bid for the presidency. For this she was suspended in her rights as a PRI "militant" (an official party position) pending an expulsion process. Gordillo has made it clear that she believes Madrazo is not a viable candidate for Mexico's presidency. The Nueva Alianza candidate, Roberto Campa, spent much of the first presidential debate attacking Madrazo.

Shortly after Gordillo's denunciation, the Mexico City newspaper Reforma published an article that condemned Madrazo as the owner of a luxury penthouse in a prestigious high-rise tower in Miami worth eight million pesos ($800,000 U.S. dollars) and three luxury apartments in Mexico City with the alleged value of seven million pesos. However, Madrazo's public declaration of assets, liabilities and expenses of January 19, 2006 denied the allegations.

Going into the elections, Madrazo polled at 30 percent.

On July 3, 2006, Madrazo and his coalition conceded defeat in the presidential election. According to official results, he received only 22.26% of the vote or 9,301,441 votes out of 41,791,322 votes—the PRI's worst presidential result to that point.

== Berlin Marathon scam ==
Madrazo was accused of cheating during the 2007 Berlin Marathon. Posting a time of 2 hours and 41 minutes, his time was 36 minutes behind the world record at the time. His 25 and 30 km checkpoints were unregistered. Madrazo finished the race in 146th place, and allegedly took 21 minutes to cover the 15 kilometers between the 20 km and 35 km marks, while the world record for this distance is 41 minutes. The cheating was revealed because the time registration of start, finish, and all split times of the marathon was done by transponder timing. Eventually Madrazo was disqualified, causing a political disturbance in Mexico.

== Personal life ==
He is married to Isabel de la Parra Trillo.

Political offices
Preceded by Víctor Manuel Barceló (interim)	Governor of Tabasco; 1995–2000	Succeeded by Enrique Priego Oropeza
Party political offices
Preceded by Dulce María Sauri Riancho	President of the Institutional Revolutionary Party; 2002–2005	Succeeded by Mariano Palacios Alcocer
Preceded by Francisco Labastida	PRI presidential candidate 2006 (lost)	Succeeded by Enrique Peña Nieto
