= Renato Vega Alvarado =

Governor of Sinaloa

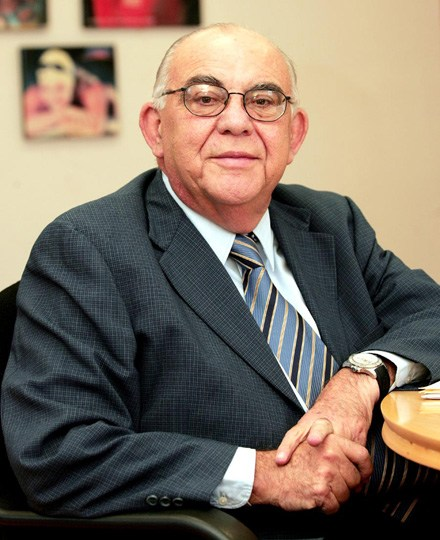

Governor of Sinaloa
- In office 1 January 1993 – 31 December 1998
- Preceded by: Francisco Labastida
- Succeeded by: Juan Sigfrido Millán Lizárraga

Personal details
- Born: 19 January 1937 San Miguel de Allende, Guanajuato
- Died: 25 March 2009 (aged 72) Culiacán, Sinaloa
- Party: Institutional Revolutionary Party
- Profession: Politician

Renato Vega Alvarado (19 January 1937 – 25 March 2009) was a Mexican politician affiliated with the Institutional Revolutionary Party (PRI). He was governor of Sinaloa from 1993 to 1998. He was also president of the Mexican Pacific League (baseball) and held several other public positions, including his election to the federal Chamber of Deputies for Sinaloa's 3rd congressional district in the 1970 general election and for Sinaloa's 9th congressional district in the 1985 mid-terms.

Vega Alvarado died on 25 March 2009, aged 72, from kidney and respiratory failure.
