= José Antonio Álvarez Lima =

Mexican politician

José Antonio Cruz Álvarez Lima

Senator for Tlaxcala
- Incumbent
- Assumed office August 29, 2018
- Succeeded by: Joel Molina Ramírez (alternate, March 2019–October 2020)

Governor of Tlaxcala
- In office February 15, 1993 – February 14, 1999
- Preceded by: Samuel Quiroz de la Vega
- Succeeded by: Alfonso Sánchez Anaya

Senator for Tlaxcala
- In office 1991–1992
- Preceded by: Álvaro Salazar Lozano
- Succeeded by: Ernesto García Sarmiento

Federal deputy for Tlaxcala's 1st district
- In office 1982–1985
- Preceded by: Salvador Domínguez Sánchez
- Succeeded by: Beatriz Paredes Rangel

Personal details
- Born: May 3, 1942 (age 83); Apizaco, Tlaxcala
- Political party: MORENA

José Antonio Cruz Álvarez Lima (born May 3, 1942) is a Mexican politician and senator representing the state of Tlaxcala in the 64th Congress. A member of the National Regeneration Movement (MORENA) political party, Álvarez Lima was also Governor of Tlaxcala from 1993 to 1999 and previously served as a federal deputy, senator, ambassador to Colombia, and head of multiple national public broadcasters.

== Life ==
=== Early years ===
Álvarez Lima was born in Apizaco, Tlaxcala. As a child, he worked in a shoe store owned by friends of his father. A graduate from the National Autonomous University of Mexico (UNAM) after a brief stint at the Monterrey Institute of Technology and Higher Education, he taught at several universities, including the Universidad Iberoamericana, Universidad Popular Autónoma del Estado de Puebla, and the UNAM; he was the president of the National Political Science College, a professional organization, from 1979 to 1980.

After several years as the deputy director of operations at Canal Once and a stint as the news director of Canal 13, in 1980, Álvarez Lima was tapped to run public radio station Radio Educación, leaving the station two years later in order to seek election to the Chamber of Deputies. Under his management, the technical and production departments were reorganized, and the station broadened its mix of music. He then served three years in the LII Legislature of the Mexican Congress (1982–1985), representing the Institutional Revolutionary Party (PRI), and a two-year term as ambassador to Colombia.

Álvarez Lima became the director of Imevisión, which operated two national television networks, in 1988. He pioneered the model by which the FIFA World Cup was broadcast by both Televisa and Imevisión, an innovation that continues to the present day.

=== First Senate term and governorship ===
After leaving the broadcaster in 1991, Álvarez Lima was elected to the Senate for the LV Legislature. He resigned the next year, however, and successfully sought election as Governor of Tlaxcala for a term from 1993 to 1999. During his term, United States president Bill Clinton visited the state.

After his term as governor expired, Álvarez Lima was invited by President Ernesto Zedillo to become Mexico's ambassador to Portugal and to assist in the crafting of a free trade agreement with Europe, and he wrote columns for Milenio and El Sol de Tlaxcala and appeared regularly on local radio station Radio Huamantla. He also became a station owner himself, taking control of XEQOO-XHQOO in Cancún. In 2004, Radio Pirata—then the leading radio station in Cancún—was sold to Grupo Imagen for a reported 100 million pesos.

=== Return to the Senate and Canal Once ===
In August 2017, Álvarez Lima was named one of the two MORENA Senate candidates from Tlaxcala for the 2018 election. Elected on the winning Juntos Haremos Historia coalition ticket alongside Ana Lilia Rivera Rivera, Álvarez Lima was appointed to head the Radio and Television Commission and sat on four others.

On January 23, 2019, López Obrador nominated Álvarez Lima to serve as the head of Canal Once, marking his return to public media after a 28 years absence. After Álvarez was installed in that position in March, alternate senator Joel Molina Ramírez took his place in the Senate. As the channel's director, he proposed deemphasizing the word "Canal" in the channel's name to emphasize its multiplatform existence and increases in the production of programming and expanded news coverage.

Molina died of COVID-19 in October 2020. This prompted Álvarez Lima to announce that he would resign from Canal Once and return to the Senate in the second half of November, after a new director for the television channel was appointed. If Álvarez Lima had opted to remain at Canal Once, the resulting vacancy in the Senate would have triggered a special election for the seat.

Álvarez Lima won re-election as one of Tlaxcala's senators in the 2024 Senate election, occupying the first place on the National Regeneration Movement's two-name formula.
