= Rogelio Montemayor Seguy =

Mexican politician and economist

Rogelio Montemayor

Governor of Coahuila
- In office December 1, 1993 – November 30, 1999
- Preceded by: Eliseo Mendoza Berrueto
- Succeeded by: Enrique Martínez y Martínez

Personal details
- Born: August 18, 1947 (age 79) Mexico City, Mexico
- Party: Institutional Revolutionary Party
- Spouse: Lucrecia Solano Martino
- Profession: Economist, politician

Rogelio Montemayor Seguy (born August 18, 1947) is a Mexican politician and economist who served as the Governor of Coahuila from December 1, 1993, to November 30, 1999.

In December 1999, Montemayor was appointed the director general of Pemex, the state-owned petroleum company, following the resignation of his predecessor, Adrian Lajous Vargas.
