= President of the Institutional Revolutionary Party =

Political leadership position in Mexico

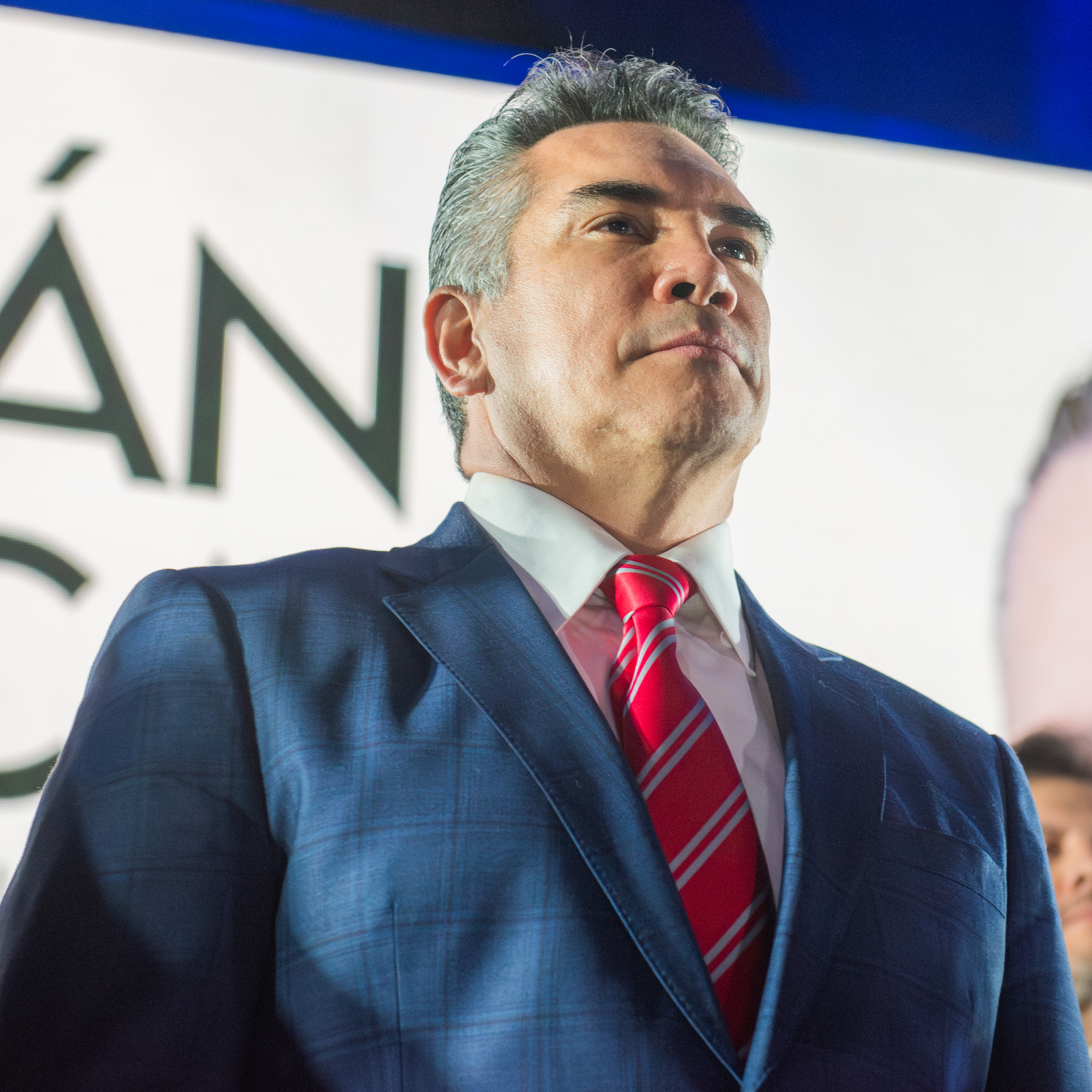
- Incumbent; Alejandro Moreno Cárdenas since 11 August 2024
- Status: Party leader
- Inaugural holder: Manuel Pérez Treviño
- Formation: 4 March 1929

The president of the Institutional Revolutionary Party (PRI), formally referred to as the President of the National Executive Committee of the Institutional Revolutionary Party, holds the highest leadership position within the party. The current president is Alejandro Moreno Cárdenas, who assumed office on 11 August 2024, having previously served as president from 2019 until July 2024.

The PRI was founded in 1929 by former President Plutarco Elías Calles under the name National Revolutionary Party (PNR). It was later renamed the Party of the Mexican Revolution (PRM) in 1938 before adopting its current name in 1946. Throughout its history, the PRI has had 57 presidents.

== Presidents of the Institutional Revolutionary Party ==
A list of presidents (including interim leaders) since the party's founding as the National Revolutionary Party in 1929.

=== National Revolutionary Party (1929–1938) ===
No.	President	General Secretary	Term of office		
No.	President	General Secretary	Took office	Left office	Time in office
1	Manuel Pérez Treviño	Luis L. León	4 March 1929	11 February 1930	344 days
2	Basilio Badillo	Matías Rodríguez Melgarejo	11 February 1930	22 April 1930	70 days
3	Emilio Portes Gil	Genaro V. Vásquez	22 April 1930	15 October 1930	176 days
4	Lázaro Cárdenas	Silvestre Guerrero	15 October 1930	25 August 1931	314 days
5	Manuel Pérez Treviño	Pascual Ortiz Rubio	28 August 1931	12 May 1933	1 year, 260 days
6	Melchor Ortega	Fernando Moctezuma	12 May 1933	9 June 1933	28 days
7	Carlos Riva Palacio	Federico Medrano V.	25 August 1933	14 December 1934	1 year, 111 days
8	Matías Ramos Santos	Antonio I. Villalobos	14 December 1934	15 June 1935	183 days
8	Matías Ramos Santos	José María Dávila	14 December 1934	15 June 1935	183 days
9	Emilio Portes Gil	Genaro V. Vásquez	15 June 1935	26 August 1936	1 year, 72 days
10	Silvano Barba González	Esteban García de Alba	26 August 1936	2 April 1938	1 year, 219 days

=== Party of the Mexican Revolution (1938–1946) ===
No.	President	General Secretary	Term of office		
No.	President	General Secretary	Took office	Left office	Time in office
11	Luis I. Rodríguez	Esteban García de Alba	2 April 1938	19 June 1939	1 year, 78 days
12	Heriberto Jara Corona	Gustavo Cárdenas Huerta	19 June 1939	2 December 1940	1 year, 166 days
13	Antonio I. Villalobos	Florencio Padilla	2 December 1940	19 January 1946	5 years, 48 days
13	Antonio I. Villalobos	Gustavo Cárdenas Huerta	2 December 1940	19 January 1946	5 years, 48 days

=== Institutional Revolutionary Party (1946–present) ===
==== 20th century ====
No.	President	General Secretary	Term of office		
No.	President	General Secretary	Took office	Left office	Time in office
14	Rafael P. Gamboa Cano	Ernesto P. Uruchurtu	19 January 1946	5 December 1946	320 days
15	Rodolfo Sánchez Taboada	Teófilo Borunda	4 December 1946	4 December 1952	6 years
15	Rodolfo Sánchez Taboada	José López Bermúdez	4 December 1946	4 December 1952	6 years
15	Rodolfo Sánchez Taboada	Adolfo López Mateos	4 December 1946	4 December 1952	6 years
16	Gabriel Leyva Velázquez	José Gómez Esparza	4 December 1952	26 April 1956	3 years, 144 days
17	Agustín Olachea Avilés	Rafael Corrales Ayala	26 April 1956	3 December 1958	2 years, 221 days
18	Alfonso Corona del Rosal	Juan Fernández Albarrán	4 December 1958	1 December 1964	5 years, 363 days
18	Alfonso Corona del Rosal	Rodolfo González Guevara	4 December 1958	1 December 1964	5 years, 363 days
19	Carlos A. Madrazo	Lauro Ortega Martínez	6 December 1964	22 November 1965	351 days
20	Lauro Ortega Martínez	Fernando Díaz Durán	22 November 1965	27 February 1968	2 years, 97 days
21	Alfonso Martínez Domínguez	Enrique Olivares Santana	27 February 1968	7 December 1970	2 years, 283 days
22	Manuel Sánchez Vite	Vicente Fuentes Díaz	7 December 1970	21 February 1972	1 year, 76 days
23	Jesús Reyes Heroles	Enrique González Pedrero	21 February 1972	25 September 1975	3 years, 216 days
24	Porfirio Muñoz Ledo	Augusto Gómez Villanueva	25 September 1975	4 December 1976	1 year, 70 days
25	Carlos Sansores Pérez	Juan Sabines Gutiérrez	4 December 1976	8 February 1979	2 years, 66 days
26	Gustavo Carvajal Moreno	José de las Fuentes Rodríguez	8 February 1979	19 March 1981	2 years, 39 days
27	Javier García Paniagua	Guillermo Cosío Vidaurri	19 March 1981	14 October 1981	209 days
28	Pedro Ojeda Paullada	Manuel Bartlett	14 October 1981	2 December 1982	1 year, 49 days
29	Adolfo Lugo Verduzco	Mario Vargas Saldaña	2 December 1982	8 October 1986	3 years, 310 days
29	Adolfo Lugo Verduzco	Francisco Luna Kan	2 December 1982	8 October 1986	3 years, 310 days
29	Adolfo Lugo Verduzco	Irma Cué Sarquis	2 December 1982	8 October 1986	3 years, 310 days
30	Jorge de la Vega Domínguez	Irma Cué Sarquis	8 October 1986	3 December 1988	2 years, 56 days
30	Jorge de la Vega Domínguez	Humberto Lugo Gil	8 October 1986	3 December 1988	2 years, 56 days
30	Jorge de la Vega Domínguez	Manuel Camacho Solís	8 October 1986	3 December 1988	2 years, 56 days
31	Luis Donaldo Colosio	Rafael Rodríguez Barrera	3 December 1988	13 April 1992	3 years, 132 days
32	Rafael Rodríguez Barrera	Beatriz Paredes Rangel	13 April 1992	14 May 1992	31 days
33	Genaro Borrego Estrada	Beatriz Paredes Rangel	14 May 1992	30 March 1993	320 days
33	Genaro Borrego Estrada	José Luis Lamadrid Sauza	14 May 1992	30 March 1993	320 days
34	Fernando Ortiz Arana	José Luis Lamadrid Sauza	30 March 1993	13 May 1994	1 year, 44 days
35	Ignacio Pichardo Pagaza	José Francisco Ruiz Massieu	13 May 1994	3 December 1994	204 days
35	Ignacio Pichardo Pagaza	María de los Ángeles Moreno	13 May 1994	3 December 1994	204 days
36	María de los Ángeles Moreno	Esteban Moctezuma	3 December 1994	19 August 1995	259 days
36	María de los Ángeles Moreno	Pedro Joaquín Coldwell	3 December 1994	19 August 1995	259 days
37	Santiago Oñate Laborde	Juan Sigfrido Millán Lizárraga	19 August 1995	13 December 1996	1 year, 116 days
38	Humberto Roque Villanueva	Juan Sigfrido Millán Lizárraga	15 December 1996	11 September 1997	270 days
39	Mariano Palacios Alcocer	Carlos Rojas Gutiérrez	11 September 1997	31 March 1999	1 year, 201 days
39	Mariano Palacios Alcocer	Rosario Green	11 September 1997	31 March 1999	1 year, 201 days
40	José Antonio González Fernández	Dulce María Sauri Riancho	1 April 1999	30 November 1999	243 days

==== 21st century ====
No.	President	General Secretary	Term of office		
No.	President	General Secretary	Took office	Left office	Time in office
41	Dulce María Sauri Riancho	Esteban Moctezuma	1 December 1999	4 March 2002	2 years, 93 days
41	Dulce María Sauri Riancho	Rodolfo Echeverría Ruiz	1 December 1999	4 March 2002	2 years, 93 days
41	Dulce María Sauri Riancho	Jesús Murillo Karam	1 December 1999	4 March 2002	2 years, 93 days
41	Dulce María Sauri Riancho	Sergio García Ramírez	1 December 1999	4 March 2002	2 years, 93 days
42	Roberto Madrazo	Elba Esther Gordillo	4 March 2002	31 August 2005	3 years, 180 days
43	Mariano Palacios Alcocer	César Augusto Santiago	31 August 2005	3 March 2007	1 year, 184 days
43	Mariano Palacios Alcocer	Rosario Green	31 August 2005	3 March 2007	1 year, 184 days
44	Beatriz Paredes Rangel	Jesús Murillo Karam	4 March 2007	4 March 2011	4 years
45	Humberto Moreira	Cristina Díaz	4 March 2011	2 December 2011	273 days
46	Cristina Díaz	Herself	2 December 2011	8 December 2011	6 days
47	Pedro Joaquín Coldwell	Cristina Díaz	8 December 2011	30 November 2012	358 days
48	Cristina Díaz	Herself	30 November 2012	11 December 2012	11 days
49	César Camacho Quiroz	Ivonne Ortega Pacheco	11 December 2012	20 August 2015	2 years, 252 days
50	Manlio Fabio Beltrones	Carolina Monroy del Mazo	20 August 2015	20 June 2016	305 days
51	Carolina Monroy del Mazo	Williams Ochoa	21 June 2016	12 July 2016	21 days
52	Enrique Ochoa Reza	Carolina Monroy del Mazo	13 July 2016	2 May 2018	1 year, 293 days
52	Enrique Ochoa Reza	Claudia Ruiz Massieu	13 July 2016	2 May 2018	1 year, 293 days
53	René Juárez Cisneros	Claudia Ruiz Massieu	2 May 2018	16 July 2018	75 days
54	Claudia Ruiz Massieu	Rubén Moreira Valdez	16 July 2018	18 August 2019	1 year, 33 days
54	Claudia Ruiz Massieu	Arturo Zamora Jiménez	16 July 2018	18 August 2019	1 year, 33 days
55	Alejandro Moreno Cárdenas	Carolina Viggiano	18 August 2019	19 July 2024	4 years, 336 days
56	Graciela Ortiz González	Miguel Alonso Reyes	19 July 2024	11 August 2024	23 days
57	Alejandro Moreno Cárdenas	Carolina Viggiano	11 August 2024	Incumbent	2 years, 27 days
