= Morbo =

Morbo may refer to:

- Morbo, morbid fascination and antagonism, descriptive of the attitudes relating to the network of identities and relationships between Spanish football clubs; see Spanish football rivalries
- Morbo, an alien news anchor on the animated television series Futurama
- Morbo (band), a Mexican band
  - Morbo (album)
- Morbo (film), a 1972 Spanish film by Gonzalo Suárez
