= Terrón =

Terrón is a surname. Notable people with the surname include:

- José Terrón (1939–2019), Spanish actor
- José Terrón (born 1991), Spanish footballer
- Miguel Ángel Terrón (born 1961), Mexican politician

== See also ==
- Terron, given name
