= Rafael Acosta =

Rafael Acosta may refer to:

- Rafael Acosta Ángeles (aka "Juanito", born 1960), Mexican activist who disputed the borough presidency of Iztapalapa in 2006
- Rafael Acosta Arévalo (1969–2019), officer in the Venezuelan Navy, victim of forced disappearance
- Rafael Acosta Croda (born 1957), Mexican politician from Veracruz
- Rafael Acosta (Venezuelan footballer), born 1989
- Rafael Acosta (Uruguayan footballer), born 1990
