= National Confederation of Popular Organizations =

Mexican political organization of the Institutional Revolutionary Party

- Confederación Nacional de Organizaciones Populares
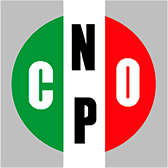
- Formation: February 28, 1943; 83 years ago
- Founded at: Guadalajara, Jalisco
- Secretary General: Cristina Díaz Salazar
- Website: cnop.mx

The Confederación Nacional de Organizaciones Populares (CNOP, "National Confederation of Popular Organizations") is a political institution of the Institutional Revolutionary Party (PRI) in Mexico. It was founded in 1943 and has historically served to represent the middle and lower classes within the party organization. Although a major sector of the PRI, it has been less studied that the worker and peasant sectors.

Its Secretary General is Senator Cristina Díaz Salazar.

== History ==
The creation of the CNOP in Guadalajara, Jalisco in February 1943 responded to the increasing middle class in Mexico in the early 20th century and the need to adequately represent them within the corporatist structure of the PRI, then known as the Party of the Mexican Revolution (PRM). It replaced the party's Popular Sector, which included the middle class and, from 1940, representatives of the military, after the military sector was abolished at the initiative of Manuel Ávila Camacho. While it also intended to represent those not included in either of the PRI's two other large representative institutions, the Confederation of Mexican Workers (CTM) and Confederación Nacional Campesina (National Rural Confederation), it was dominated by the middle class, and seven of its ten branches ultimately represented that sector of society. Moreover, its primary function in the PRM/PRI system was to simultaneously create a mediated venue for political participation while securing middle-class support for PRI policies and creating a farm system for new politicians, loyal to the president, outside of the CTM and CNC; this was particularly important during a time when Ávila Camacho needed "a loyal creature of the executive" and an institution to balance the CTM and CNC, both roles the CNOP filled. The "backbone" of the CNOP was the Federation of Unions of Workers in State Service (FSTSE), a holdover from the government of Lázaro Cárdenas; this organization connected the CNOP and the federal government, and given the dominance of bureaucrats in the former, it held considerable sway.

The CNOP continued to grow in power and size through the government of Miguel Alemán Valdés, which emphasized urban development and sought to target the country's urban middle class. Given the post-1946 focus on stability and government institutions, and thus on the middle class, the CNOP continued to become an institution devoted to the development of new political leaders. It also allowed the government to exercise political muscle against the CTM and CNC, particularly in the demands for higher wages that followed the 1948 devaluation of the Mexican peso. As its relative influence in the PRI structure grew, so too did the proportion of federal legislators that were members; the middle class represented 43% of deputies in 1943 and 55% in 1967. However, as agitation grew in the PRI for change and reform, the CNOP's national importance waned.

In 2015, the CNOP moved to new headquarters on Plaza de la República, which had previously been the former facilities of the Dirección Federal de Seguridad, which Proceso described as "the most sinister building in the country".
