= Por Ti =

Por Ti (transl. "for you") may refer to:

- Por ti (Mexican TV series), 2002 Mexican telenovela
- Por Ti (Portuguese TV series), a 2022 Portuguese telenovela
- Por Ti (album), by Ednita Nazario
- Por ti, an album by the Banda el Recodo
- "Por ti" (song), a song by Belanova
- "Por ti", a song by Ally Brooke
- "Por ti", a song by Óscar Chávez
- "Por ti", a song by Florentino and Bad Gyal
- "Por ti", a song by Karol G
- "Por ti", a song by Morbo from Morbo
- "Por ti", a song by Tito El Bambino and Lenny Tavárez
