= Santiago Oñate Laborde =

Mexican lawyer and politician

Permanent Observer of Mexico to the Council of Europe
- Incumbent
- Assumed office 1 August 2013
- Preceded by: Lydia Madero García

37th President of the Institutional Revolutionary Party
- In office 18 August 1995 – 13 December 1996
- Preceded by: María de los Ángeles Moreno
- Succeeded by: Humberto Roque Villanueva

Secretary of Labor and Social Welfare of Mexico
- In office 1 December 1994 – 18 August 1995
- President: Ernesto Zedillo
- Preceded by: Manuel Gómez Peralta
- Succeeded by: Javier Bonilla

President of the Chamber of Deputies
- In office 1 October 1987 – 31 October 1987
- Preceded by: Elba Esther Gordillo
- Succeeded by: César Augusto Santiago

Member of the Chamber of Deputies for the Federal District's 25th district
- In office 1 September 1985 – 31 August 1988
- Preceded by: Jesús Salazar Toledano
- Succeeded by: Demetrio Sodi

Personal details
- Born: 24 May 1949 (age 77) Mexico City, Mexico
- Party: Partido Revolucionario Institucional
- Education: Universidad Nacional Autónoma de México

Santiago Oñate Laborde (b. Mexico City, 1949) is a Mexican lawyer and politician affiliated with the Institutional Revolutionary Party (PRI).

Oñate Laborde graduated as lawyer from the law faculty in the Universidad Nacional Autónoma de México (UNAM) in 1972. He has gone on to serve in several positions inside the PRI and in the Mexican government. He was elected to the Chamber of Deputies in 1985 and to the Federal District Legislative Assembly upon expiration of his term as a federal legislator in 1998. In 1991 and 1992 he served as Ambassador to the Organization of American States and, in 1993, as the head of the Environmental Attorney's Office (Procuraduría Federal de Protección al Medio Ambiente or PROFEPA). In 1995 he was designated President of the PRI. He served for President Carlos Salinas as the head of the Presidency's Office (Oficina de la Presidencia). President Ernesto Zedillo appointed him as Secretary of Labor.

In 1997, Oñate Laborde became Ambassador of Mexico to the United Kingdom, position he would hold until 2001, year when he became Ambassador of Mexico to the Netherlands. While serving as ambassador in the Netherlands, he also acted as the Permanent Representative of Mexico to the Organisation for the Prohibition of Chemical Weapons. His term as ambassador ended in 2003, but he would continue his activities in the OPCW, serving as legal adviser and later on as special adviser to the Director General. In 2013 he became the Permanent Observer of Mexico to the Council of Europe, in Strasbourg, France.

He pursued further studies at the London School of Economics and Political Science and at the University of Wisconsin, the latter of which also saw him as professor, along with the Universidad Autónoma Metropolitana, the Universidad Nacional Autónoma de México, and Leiden University.

He was appointed as Honorary Officer of the Order of the British Empire (OBE) in the 2025 Special Honours for services to International Diplomacy and the Rule of Law.

== Publications ==
- Laborde, Santiago Oñate (1978), El acceso a la justicia y los no privilegiados en México (Access to justice and the underprivileged in Mexico) (in Spanish), Revista de Derecho Procesal. Iberoamericana
- Woolomes Tabassi, Lisa; Laborde, Santiago Oñate; Rugarabamu, Donata (2010), OPCW: The Legal Texts (2 ed.), Asser Press, ISBN 978-90-6704-318-2
- "La Acción Procesal en la doctrina y en el derecho positivo mexicano", Mexico, 1972.
- "El Estado y el Derecho", S. Oñate and D. Pantoja, Anuies-Edicol, Mexico, 1977.
- "Evolución del Derecho Procesal Mexicano", in LXXV Años de Evolución Jurídica en el Mundo, UNAM, Instituto de Investigaciones Jurídicas, Mexico, 1978.
- "Legal Aid in Mexico", in F. Zemans Legal Aid, Pinter Publishers, London, 1979.
- "Legal Needs of the Poor and Disadvantaged", B. Garth, ed., Madison, Wisconsin, 1983.
- "Los trabajadores migratorios frente a la justicia norteamericana", S.T.P.S.-FONEP, Mexico, 1983.
- "El papel de juez en la resolución de Litigios Familiares", in International Congress of Comparative Law; National reports, H. Nakamura (ed.) Tokio, Japan, 1984.
- "Administración de justicia y composición de conflictos laborales", in El Obrero Mexicano, Vol. 4, 21st century, Mexico, 1985.
- "El Veto Suspensivo", in El Refrendo y las Relaciones entre el Congreso y el Ejecutivo, UNAM-Porrúa, 1987.
- "El regimen de partidos", in Jornadas Jurídicas Nacionales, Fenase-Porrúa, 1987.
- "Fuentes e interpretación del derecho parlamentario", in Derecho Parlamentario Iberoamericano, Porrúa, 1987.
- "Nuevos mecanismos de defensa del ciudadano frente a la administración pública", in Administración Pública Contemporánea en México, Mexico, 1993.
- "Presidentialisme en democratie. Het geval van Mexico", in Drie Kwesties in Latijns Amerikas, L. Malaver and M. Oostra., ed. LASO, Amsterdam, 2002.
- "Decision on the Follow-up to the OPCW Action Plan on Article VII: Ensuring the Effective Implementation of the Chemical Weapons Convention", with L. Tabassi and Ralf Trapp, The CBW Conventions Bulletin, 69–70, September–December 2005, pp. 5–10.
- "Lessons learned: Chemicals trader convicted of war crimes", with B. Exterkate, L. Tabassi and E. van der Borght, Journal Judiciaire de La Haye, volume 2, number 1, 2007, pp. 23–42.
- "Sustaining follow-up to the Action Plan on Article VII: National Implementation of the Chemical Weapons Convention", with M. Lak, L. Tabassi and K-S. Melzer, in Chemical Disarmament, volume 5, number 1, March 2007, pp. 18–24.
- "Industry Role in the Non-proliferation of Chemical Weapons", International Law Association, 74th Conference, The Hague, August 2010.
- "The Chemical Weapons Convention: An Overview", Audiovisual Library of International Law, UN, 2010.
- "The Relation between Due Process in International and National Human Rights Instruments and International Adjudication Mechanisms", en The Development and Effectiveness of International Administrative Law, edited by O. Elias, Martinus Nijhoff, Leiden-Boston, 2012, pp. 375–385.

Party political offices
Preceded by María de los Ángeles Moreno	President of the Partido Revolucionario Institucional; 1995–1996	Succeeded by Humberto Roque Villanueva
Political offices
Preceded by Manuel Gómez Peralta	Secretary of Labor and Social Welfare of Mexico; 1994–1995	Succeeded by Javier Bonilla
Diplomatic posts
Preceded by Andrés Rozental Gutman	Ambassador of Mexico to the United Kingdom; 1997–2001	Succeeded by Alma Rosa Moreno Razo
Preceded by Ignacio Pichardo Pagaza	Ambassador of Mexico to the Netherlands; 2001–2003	Succeeded by Sandra Fuentes-Berain Villenave
Preceded by Lydia Madero García	Permanent Observer of Mexico to the Council of Europe; 2013–present	Incumbent
