= Rafael Rodríguez Barrera =

Mexican politician (1937–2011)

Governor of Campeche
- In office September 16, 1973 – September 15, 1979
- Preceded by: Carlos Pérez Cámara
- Succeeded by: Eugenio Echeverría Castellot

Personal details
- Born: February 1, 1937 San Francisco de Campeche, Campeche
- Died: December 3, 2011 (aged 74) Mexico City
- Party: Institutional Revolutionary Party (PRI)
- Profession: Lawyer

Rafael Rodríguez Barrera (February 1, 1937 – December 3, 2011) was a Mexican politician, lawyer and ambassador. He held office as the Governor of the Mexican state of Campeche from 1973 until 1979. Rodríguez also served as the President of the Institutional Revolutionary Party (PRI) from 1992 to 1993.

Rodríguez Barrera began his career as a lawyer. He became Mayor, also called Municipal President, of Campeche, Campeche. Rodríguez Barrera was elected Governor of Campeche, holding the state's gubernatorial office from September 16, 1973, until September 15, 1979.

Mexican President Miguel de la Madrid appointed Rodríguez Barrera as Secretary of Agrarian Reform. in 1986. Rodríguez Barrera succeeded outgoing Secretary Luis Martínez Villicaña, who left the Cabinet upon his election as Governor of Michoacan. Rodríguez Barrera remained Secretary until November 30, 1988, when President Miguel de la Madrid left office.

Rodriguez Barrera was briefly appointed President of the Institutional Revolutionary Party in April 1992, holding the presidency of the political party until March 1993. He was then appointed the Mexican Ambassador to Israel, based in Tel Aviv, serving from April 14, 1993, to 1995.

He was elected to the Chamber of Deputies of Mexico from 2000 to 2003, where he acted as the internal coordinator for the PRI party in the chamber. In 2005 and 2006, Rodríguez Barrera was named to the PRI party committee charged with selecting a presidential candidate for the 2006 presidential election.

Rodríguez Barrera died from a heart attack at his home in Mexico City on December 3, 2011, at the age of 74. His death was announced by PRI President Cristina Díaz through her Twitter account.

== See also ==
- List of presidents of Campeche Municipality
