= Ignacio Pichardo Pagaza =

Mexican politician (1935–2020)

35th President of the Institutional Revolutionary Party
- In office 13 May 1994 – 3 December 1994
- Preceded by: Fernando Ortiz Arana
- Succeeded by: María de los Ángeles Moreno

Governor of the State of Mexico
- In office 11 September 1989 – 15 September 1993
- Preceded by: Mario Ramón Beteta
- Succeeded by: Emilio Chuayffet

Personal details
- Born: 13 November 1935 Toluca, State of Mexico, Mexico
- Died: 14 April 2020 (aged 84) Santa Fe, Mexico City, Mexico
- Party: Institutional Revolutionary

José Ignacio Pichardo Pagaza (13 November 1935 – 14 April 2020) was a Mexican politician who served as governor of the State of Mexico from 1989 to 1993.

== Life ==
Pichardo Pagaza was born in Toluca, State of Mexico, in 1935. In the 1979 mid-terms he was elected to the Chamber of Deputies to represent the State of Mexico's 27th district.

He later served in the Cabinet of President Miguel de la Madrid as general comptroller (1987–1988) and in the cabinet of President Ernesto Zedillo as Secretary of Energy. He was a member of the Institutional Revolutionary Party (PRI) and served as its president in 1994. He later served as Ambassador to Spain and the Netherlands.

He was the father of politician José Ignacio Pichardo Lechuga and of Alfonso Pichardo, lead singer of Mexican electronica group Moenia. And he is a nephew of Juan Josafat Pichardo Cruz, who was the first Rector or the Universidad Autónoma del Estado de México UAEM.

He died on 14 April 2020, aged 84.

Diplomatic posts
Preceded by Arturo Hernández Basave	Mexican Ambassador to the Netherlands; 1996–2000	Succeeded by Santiago Oñate Laborde
