= Gudiño =

Gudiño (sometimes written without the tilde as Gudino) is a Spanish surname. Notable people with this name include:

== Surname ==
- Alfredo Anaya Gudiño (born 1950), Mexican politician
- Andrés Gudiño (born 1997), Mexican footballer
- Irving Gudiño (born 2000), Panamanian footballer
- Gabriel Gudiño (born 1992), Argentine footballer
- Jorge Gudiño (1920–1995), Mexican basketball player
- Raúl Gudiño (born 1996), Mexican footballer
- Rodrigo Gudiño, Mexican-Canadian film director and editor

== Middle name ==
- Carolina Gudiño Corro (born 1981), Mexican politician
- Eduardo Gudiño Kieffer (1935–2002), Argentine writer
- Francisco Javier Gudiño Ortiz (born 1968), Mexican politician
- José de Jesús Gudiño Pelayo (1943–2010), Mexican jurist

== Other uses ==
- Julian Feoli-Gudino (born 1987), Costa Rican gridiron football player
- Jesse González (born 1995 as José Luis González Gudiño), American professional soccer player
