= Cecilia Medina =

Chilean jurist

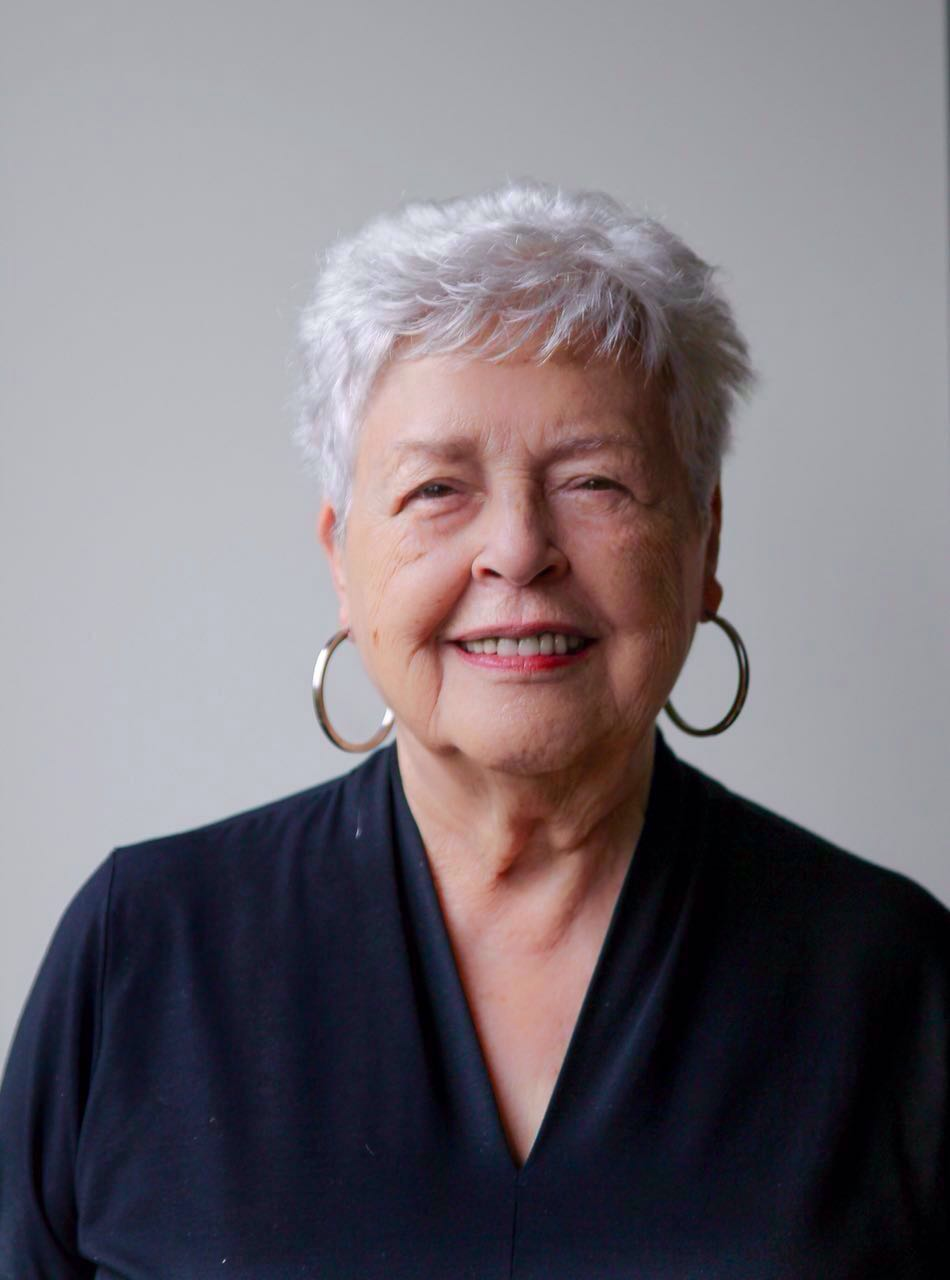
Cecilia Medina Quiroga (2016)

Cecilia Medina Quiroga (born 1935 in Concepción) is a Chilean jurist.

== Biography ==
Cecilia Medina studied legal and social sciences at the University of Chile in Santiago and earned a doctorate in law at the University of Utrecht in the Netherlands.

From 1995 to 2002 she was a member of the United Nations Human Rights Committee, including a period as its chair in 1999–2000. While on the Human Rights Committee she authored its General Comment 28 on the rights of men and women as set out in Article 3 of the International Covenant on Civil and Political Rights.

In 2004 she was elected to the Inter-American Court of Human Rights, serving as its vice president in 2007 and as its president for the 2008–09 period (the first time a woman has held the office). In 2004 she also became a member of the International Commission of Jurists. In 2006 she was awarded the Gruber Prize for Women's Rights.

In December 2006, the United Nations Human Rights Council selected her for the group of independent experts assigned to investigate the November 2006 Beit Hanoun incident.

She is a co-director, with José Zalaquett, of the University of Chile's Human Rights Centre, where she organises a postgraduate course on women's rights for practising lawyers. She has also taught at Lund University, the International Institute of Human Rights, the University of Toronto, the United Nations University for Peace, the University of Utrecht and Harvard University, and has published extensively on human rights issues.

Preceded by Sergio García Ramírez	President of the Inter-American Court of Human Rights; 2008–2009
