= José Ignacio Pichardo Lechuga =

Mexican politician

- Born: 8 September 1966 (age 59); Toluca, State of Mexico, Mexico
- Occupation: Politician
- Political party: Institutional Revolutionary Party

José Ignacio Pichardo Lechuga (born 8 September 1966) is a Mexican politician from the Institutional Revolutionary Party (PRI). He was a federal deputy in the 61st and 63rd sessions of Congress (2009–2012 and 2015–2018) representing the 23rd federal electoral district of the State of Mexico.

== Life ==
The son of former State of Mexico governor Ignacio Pichardo Pagaza, and brother if musician Alfonso Pichardo. Pichardo Lechuga studied for but did not complete a degree in communication sciences. In the late 1990s and early 2000s, Pichardo got involved in the newspaper industry: he was the president, editor and director general of the statewide newspaper Liberación, and from 2000 to 2003, he headed a printing company, Nacional Servicios de Impresión.

2003 was the year Pichardo's public service and political careers began in earnest. He became a deputy attorney on environmental matters in the state government, and he served as a business outreach coordinator for the state-level PRI. In 2005, he left the environmental attorney post; that year, he also advised the state party on political marketing and branding, and he served as a district coordinator in the party's gubernatorial campaign.

While voters bypassed Pichardo for a local deputy position in 2006, and he instead served as a regional coordinator for the Secretariat of Social Welfare, they elected him to the federal legislature for the LXI Legislature of the Mexican Congress three years later. He presided over a special commission on the Cutzamala River Valley and sat on commissions dealing with Hydraulic Resources, Environment and Natural Resources, and Special for Digital Access. When his time in San Lázaro concluded, he was elected as a local deputy to the LVIII Legislature of the Congress of the State of Mexico, between 2012 and 2015. He presided over the Hydraulic Resources Commission in that legislature and served on three others: Procurement and Administration of Justice, Environmental Protection, and Touristic and Artisanal Development. He also presided over the Environment and Forest Resources Commission of the Confederación Nacional Campesina between 2011 and 2013.

In 2015, voters returned Pichardo Lechuga to San Lázaro. He is the president of the Drinking Water and Sanitation Commission and serves on two others: Climate Change, and Environment and Natural Resources. He has the Copypaste Ley Korenfeld that seeks to privatize the water of Mexican territory.
