= Laura Barrera Fortoul =

Mexican politician

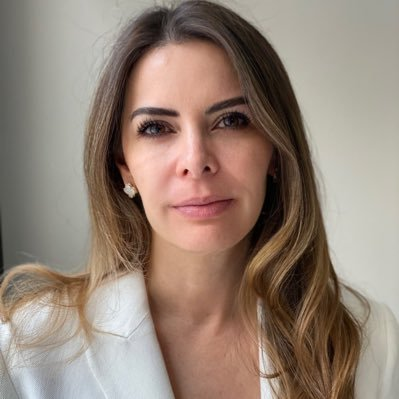
- Born: 10 May 1976 (age 50); Villa del Carbón, State of Mexico, Mexico
- Education: Economist
- Occupation: Politician
- Political party: PRI
- Family: Married

Laura Barrera Fortoul (born 10 May 1976) is a Mexican economist and politician affiliated with the Institutional Revolutionary Party (PRI).

She has been elected to the Chamber of Deputies on two occasions: in the 2012 general election, for the State of Mexico's 27th district, and in the 2021 mid-terms, as a plurinominal deputy.
