= Terron =

Terron is a given name. Notable people with the given name include:

- Terron Armstead (born 1991), American football offensive tackle
- Terron Brooks (born 1974), American singer, songwriter, and actor
- Terron Millett (born 1968), American boxer
- Terron Schaefer, Brazilian businessman
- Terron Ward (born 1992), American football running back

== See also ==
- Terrón, surname
