= Humberto Roque Villanueva =

Mexican politician

Humberto Roque Villanueva (born 16 November 1943) is a Mexican politician affiliated with the Partido Revolucionario Institucional (PRI). He was born in Torreón, Coahuila.

He has served as the president of the PRI, a senator for Coahuila, and in the federal Chamber of Deputies, representing Coahuila's Sixth District from 1988 to 1991. He was the President of the Chamber of Deputies in 1994.

He fought the PRI's presidential primary in 1999, seeking his party's nomination for the 2000 presidential election, but lost to Francisco Labastida Ochoa. He instead served as a Senator from 2000 to 2006.

Preceded by Santiago Oñate Laborde	President of the Institutional Revolutionary Party; 1996–1997	Succeeded by Mariano Palacios Alcocer
