= Mónica Arriola Gordillo =

Mexican politician (1971–2016)

Monica Tzasna Arriola Gordillo
- Born: May 14, 1971; Mexico City, Mexico
- Died: March 14, 2016 (aged 44); Mexico City, Mexico
- Occupation: Politician

Monica Tzasna Arriola Gordillo (14 May 1971 – 14 March 2016) was a Mexican politician affiliated with the New Alliance Party.

She died of brain cancer on 14 March 2016 in Mexico City.

== Personal life and education ==
Arriola Gordillo was the daughter of Elba Esther Gordillo. She got her bachelor's degree in Latin American literature from the Universidad Iberoamericana.

== Political career ==
Arriola was a member of the New Alliance Party who in 2006 secured a seat in the Chamber of Deputies of Mexico via proportional representation to serve during the LX Legislature. In October 2006 she traveled to other Latin American countries with Felipe Calderón during the first overseas trip of Calderon as president-elect of Mexico.
