= Alfonso Pichardo =

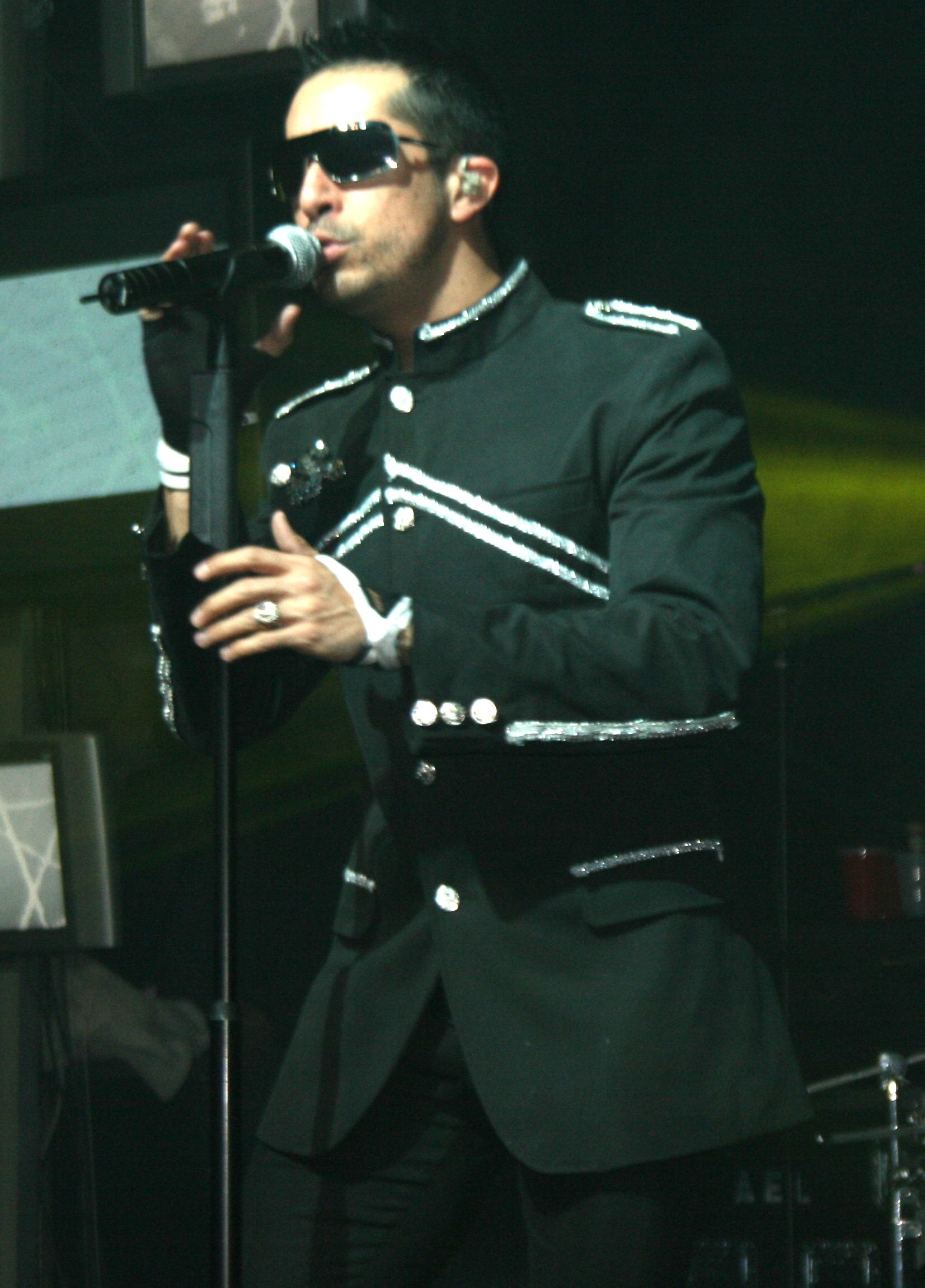
- Pichardo performing with Mœnia.

Background information
- Born: Santiago Alfonso Pichardo Lechuga; February 1, 1973 (age 52); Mexico City, Mexico
- Genres: Electronic; synth-pop; electro pop; dance music
- Years active: 1988–1993 & 1998–present
- Labels: Sony Latin, OCESA, OCESA SeiTrack, Promotodo
- Website: http://www.moenia.com/

Santiago Alfonso Pichardo Lechuga (born February 1, 1973, in Mexico City) is a co-founder and current lead singer of Mexican electronic group Mœnia. Pichardo served as Mœnia's vocalist in their early years but was replaced by Juan Carlos Lozano in 1993, and in 1998 he came back to record the group's second album, Adición.

His father is the politician Ignacio Pichardo and his brother is the politician José Ignacio Pichardo Lechuga. Alfonso Pichardo is married with Zuzana C since 2016

Alfonso has also started a solo project and released an EP album entitled Equivocal with the song "Dar la Vuelta".
