= Antonio Toledo Corro =

Mexican politician

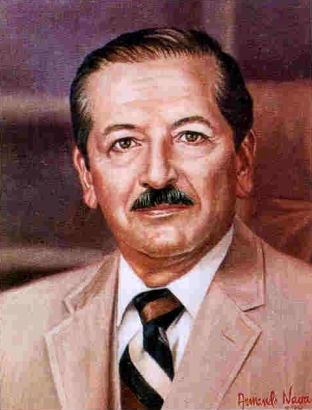

Governor of Sinaloa
- In office 1 January 1981 – 31 December 1986
- Preceded by: Alfonso Calderón Velarde
- Succeeded by: Francisco Labastida

Secretary of Agrarian Reform
- In office 6 July 1978 – 15 April 1983
- President: José López Portillo
- Preceded by: Jorge Rojo Lugo
- Succeeded by: Javier García Paniagua

Personal details
- Born: 1 April 1919 Escuinapa de Hidalgo, Sinaloa
- Died: 6 July 2018 (aged 99) Mazatlán, Sinaloa
- Party: Institutional Revolutionary Party
- Spouse: Estela Ortiz (m. 1946; died 2009)

Antonio Toledo Corro (Note: In this Mexican name, the surname is Toledo and the second or maternal family name is Corro.) (1 April 1919 – 6 July 2018) was a Mexican politician from the state of Sinaloa. He was a member of the Institutional Revolutionary Party (PRI).

Born in Escuinapa de Hidalgo, Sinaloa, he served as municipal president of Mazatlán from 1959 to 1962. Toledo ran a tractor business and was the director of a newspaper. He was secretary of agrarian reform during the term of President José López Portillo, a personal friend, from 1978 to 1980. Toledo was Governor of Sinaloa from 1981 to 1986. During his tenure a highway connecting Culiacán with Guasave was built, and the Universidad de Occidente and the Colegio de Bachilleres de Sinaloa were founded. However, drug violence also increased substantially, with 6,500 homicides reported.

Toledo was married to Estela Ortiz and had three sons. He died on 6 July 2018, at the age of 99. He had been hospitalized in a Mazatlán hospital since 29 June, and had been suffering from several different ailments, including pneumonia.
