= María de los Ángeles Moreno =

Mexican politician (1945–2019)

President of the Senate
- In office 1 October 1997 – 31 October 1997
- Preceded by: Eduardo Andrade Sánchez
- Succeeded by: Fernando Solana

36th President of the Institutional Revolutionary Party
- In office 4 December 1994 – 18 August 1995
- Preceded by: Ignacio Pichardo Pagaza
- Succeeded by: Santiago Oñate Laborde

President of the Chamber of Deputies
- In office 1 November 1992 – 30 November 1992
- Preceded by: Gustavo Carvajal Moreno
- Succeeded by: Guillermo Pacheco Pulido

Secretary of Fisheries
- In office 1 December 1988 – 16 May 1991
- President: Carlos Salinas de Gortari
- Preceded by: Pedro Ojeda Paullada
- Succeeded by: Guillermo Jiménez Morales

Personal details
- Born: 15 January 1945; Mexico City, Mexico
- Died: 27 April 2019 (aged 74); Mexico City, Mexico
- Political party: Institutional Revolutionary
- Education: National Autonomous University of Mexico

María de los Ángeles Moreno Uriegas (15 January 1945 – 27 April 2019) was a Mexican politician who was the first woman to be elected president of a Mexican political party.

== Personal life and education ==
Born in Mexico City, Moreno Uriegas was the daughter of Manuel Moreno and Amalia Uriegas Sánchez. She held a bachelor's degree in economics from the National Autonomous University of Mexico (UNAM) and pursued graduate studies at the Institute of Social Studies in The Hague, Netherlands.

== Political career ==
Moreno Uriegas became an active member of the Institutional Revolutionary Party (PRI) in 1960. She served in the cabinet of President Carlos Salinas de Gortari as Secretary of Fisheries from December 1988 to May 1991. She was then elected to the Chamber of Deputies, where she served as President in 1992. In December 1994, Moreno was elected President of her political party, becoming the first woman in Mexico to hold that position. From 1994 to 2000, she served in the Senate, representing the Federal District; in 1997, she was the President of the Senate and in 1999, President of the Permanent Commission of the Congress. From 2000 to 2003, she served as a deputy in the Legislative Assembly of the Federal District. In 2006, she returned to the Senate through the proportional representation (PR) mechanism.

Moreno died in Mexico City on 27 April 2019, at the age of 74.

| Preceded by Ignacio Pichardo Pagaza | President of the Institutional Revolutionary Party; 1994—1995 | Succeeded by Santiago Oñate Laborde |
| Preceded by José Francisco Ruiz Massieu | General Secretary of the Institutional Revolutionary Party; 1994 | Succeeded by Pedro Joaquín Coldwell |
| Preceded by Pedro Ojeda Paullada | Secretary of Fisheries; 1988—1991 | Succeeded by Guillermo Jiménez Morales |
