= Xavier Maawad Robert =

Mexican politician

Luis Xavier Maawad Robert
- Born: 20 May 1952 (age 74); Toluca, State of Mexico, Mexico
- Education: Industrial Engineer
- Occupation: Politician
- Political party: PAN
- Spouse: Nancy Reyes
- Children: Ana Gabriela, Isabela & Daniela
- Parent: Father: Javier Maawad Albarrán Mother: María del Carmen Robert

Luis Xavier Maawad Robert (born 20 May 1952) is a Mexican politician affiliated with the National Action Party (PAN). In the 2006 general election he was elected to the Chamber of Deputies to represent the State of Mexico's 27th district during the 60th session of Congress.
