= Mariana García Rojas =

Mexican politician

- Born: 29 October 1974 (age 51); Mexico City, Mexico
- Occupation: Deputy
- Political party: PAN

Mariana Dunyaska García Rojas (born 29 October 1974) is a Mexican politician affiliated with the National Action Party (PAN).

She has served in the Chamber of Deputies on two occasions: during the 62nd Congress (2012–2015), as a plurinominal deputy for the third region, and during the 64th Congress (2018–2021), representing Veracruz's 12th congressional district.
