= René Fujiwara =

Mexican politician

- Born: René Ricardo Fujiwara Montelongo; 7 April 1984 (age 42); Mexico City, Mexico
- Education: University of Sussex
- Occupation: Deputy
- Political party: PANAL
- Relatives: Elba Esther Gordillo
- Website: http://renefujiwara.net/

René Ricardo Fujiwara Montelongo (born 7 April 1984) is a Mexican politician affiliated with the PANAL. As of 2013 he served as Deputy of the LXII Legislature of the Mexican Congress representing the Federal District. He is the grandson of Elba Esther Gordillo. He has a degree in philosophy from the University of Sussex.
