= 12th federal electoral district of Veracruz =

Federal electoral district of Mexico

Veracruz's 12th
- Electoral district of the Chamber of Deputies of Mexico

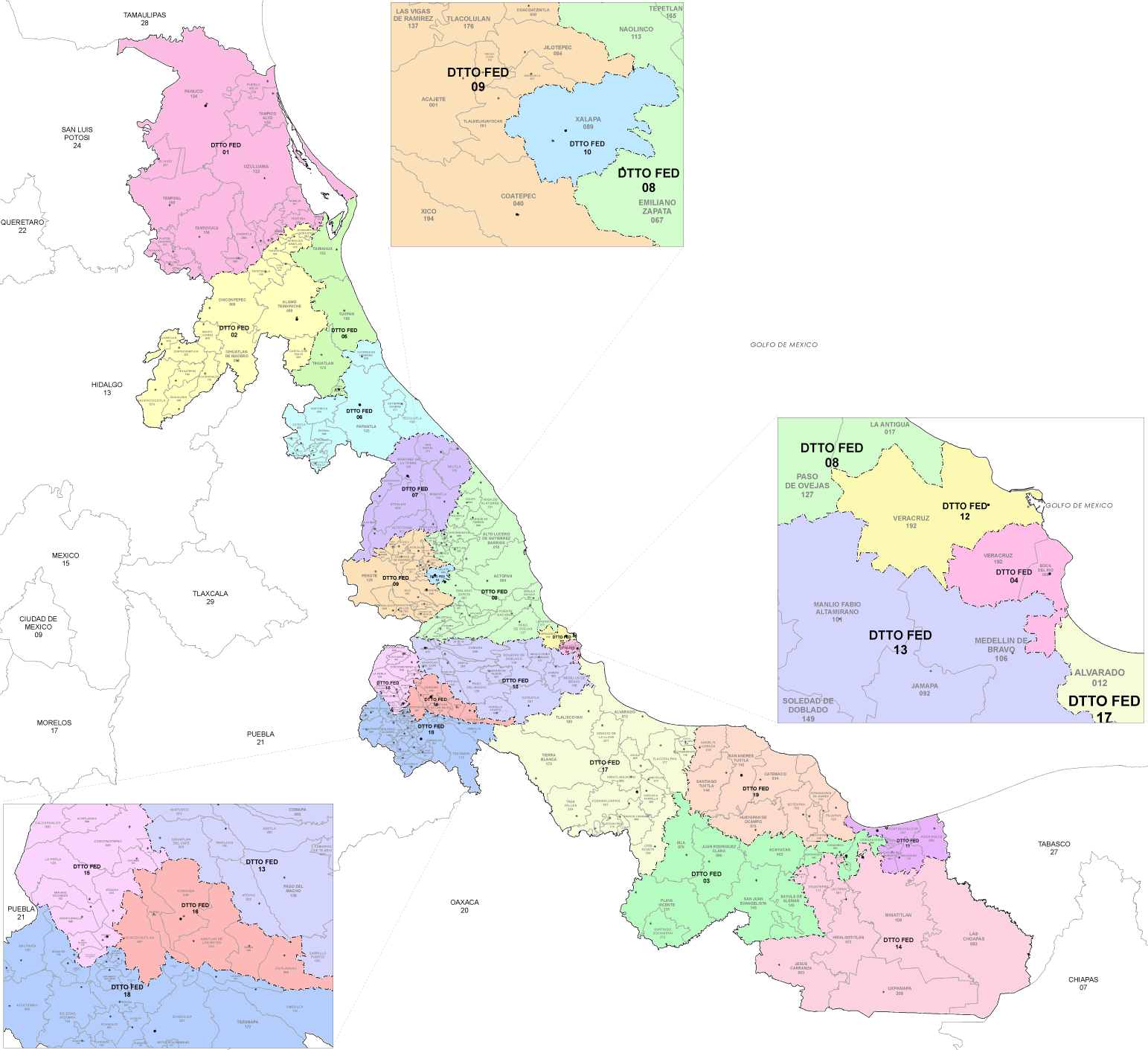
- 12th district since 2023

Incumbent
- Member: Rosa Hernández Espejo
- Party: ▌Morena
- Congress: 66th (2024–2027)

District
- State: Veracruz
- Head town: Veracruz
- Coordinates: 19°11′N 96°09′W
- Covers: Municipality of Veracruz (part)
- PR region: Third
- Precincts: 231
- Population: 375,657 (2020 census)

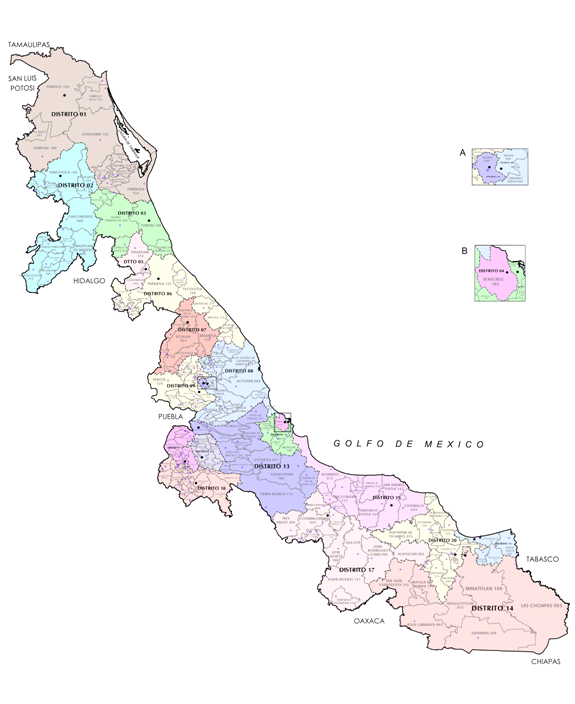
Veracruz under the 2017–2022 districting plan

The 12th federal electoral district of Veracruz (Spanish: Distrito electoral federal 12 de Veracruz) is one of the 300 electoral districts into which Mexico is divided for elections to the federal Chamber of Deputies and one of 19 such districts in the state of Veracruz.

It elects one deputy to the lower house of Congress for each three-year legislative session by means of the first-past-the-post system. Votes cast in the district also count towards the calculation of proportional representation ("plurinominal") deputies elected from the third region.

The current member for the district, elected in the 2024 general election, is Rosa Hernández Espejo of the National Regeneration Movement (Morena).

== District territory ==
Veracruz lost a congressional district in the 2023 districting plan adopted by the National Electoral Institute (INE), which is to be used for the 2024, 2027 and 2030 elections. The reconfigured 12th district covers 231 electoral precincts (secciones electorales) across the bulk of the municipality of Veracruz, including the downtown area of the port of Veracruz (the southern portion of the city is assigned to the 4th district based in Boca del Río).

The head town (cabecera distrital), where results from individual polling stations are gathered together and tallied, is the city of Veracruz. The district reported a population of 375,657 in the 2020 census.

== Previous districting schemes ==
Evolution of electoral district numbers
	1974	1978	1996	2005	2017	2023
Veracruz	15	23	23	21	20	19
Chamber of Deputies	196	300				

Because of shifting demographics, Veracruz currently has four fewer districts than the 23 the state was allocated under the 1977 electoral reforms.

2017–2022

Between 2017 and 2022, Veracruz was assigned 20 electoral districts. The 12th district covered 181 precincts (secciones electorales) in the municipality of Veracruz, plus the municipalities of Boca del Río, Jamapa, Manlio Fabio Altamirano and Medellín. Its head town was the city of Veracruz.

2005–2017

Veracruz's allocation of congressional seats fell to 21 in the 2005 redistricting process. Between 2005 and 2017 the 12th district had its head town at Veracruz and it comprised the north-western portion of the municipality of Veracruz.

1996–2005

Under the 1996 districting plan, which allocated Veracruz 23 districts, the head town was the city of Veracruz and the district covered the city and its surrounding municipality.

1978–1996

The districting scheme in force from 1978 to 1996 was the result of the 1977 electoral reforms, which increased the number of single-member seats in the Chamber of Deputies from 196 to 300. Under that plan, Veracruz's seat allocation rose from 15 to 23. The 12th district had its head town at Cosamaloapan and it covered the municipalities of Acula, Alvarado, Amatitlán, Cosamaloapan, Chacaltianguis, Ignacio de la Llave, Ixmatlahuacán, Otatitlán, Tierra Blanca, Tlacojalpan and Tuxtilla.

== Deputies returned to Congress ==
(Mexico) National parties
- Current
- PAN
- PRI
- PT
- PVEM
- MC
- Morena
- PAZ
- Somos
- Defunct or local only
- PLM
- PNR
- PRM
- PNM
- PP
- PPS
- PARM
- PFCRN
- CON
- PANAL
- PSD
- PES
- PES
- PRD

Veracruz's 12th district
Election	Deputy	Party	Term	Legislature
1916	Ángel Juarico		1916–1917	Constituent Congress of Querétaro
...
1961	Gonzalo Aguirre Beltrán	Institutional Revolutionary Party	1961–1964	45th Congress
1964	José Antonio Cobos Panamá	Institutional Revolutionary Party	1964–1967	46th Congress
1967	Mariano Ramos Zarrabal	Institutional Revolutionary Party	1967–1970	47th Congress
1970	Ignacio Altamirano Marín	Institutional Revolutionary Party	1970–1973	48th Congress
1973	Fidel Herrera Beltrán	Institutional Revolutionary Party	1973–1976	49th Congress
1976	Mario Hernández Posadas	Institutional Revolutionary Party	1976–1979	50th Congress
1979	Gonzalo Vázquez Bravo	Institutional Revolutionary Party	1979–1982	51st Congress
1982	Irma Cué de Duarte	Institutional Revolutionary Party	1982–1985	52nd Congress
1985	Isidro Pulido Reyes	Institutional Revolutionary Party	1985–1988	53rd Congress
1988	Gilberto Uzlanga Medina	Institutional Revolutionary Party	1988–1991	54th Congress
1991	Fidel Herrera Beltrán	Institutional Revolutionary Party	1991–1994	55th Congress
1994	Manuel Pérez Bonilla	Institutional Revolutionary Party	1994–1997	56th Congress
1997	María del Socorro Aubry Orozco	Party of the Democratic Revolution	1997–2000	57th Congress
2000	Sergio Vaca Betancourt Bretón	National Action Party (Mexico)	2000–2003	58th Congress
2003	Francisco Juan Ávila Camberos	National Action Party (Mexico)	2003–2006	59th Congress
2006	María Victoria Gutiérrez Lagunes	National Action Party (Mexico)	2006–2009	60th Congress
2009	Carolina Gudiño Corro (Note: Gudiño resigned her seat on 23 March 2010 to run (successfully) for mayor of Veracruz.); Nely Miranda	Institutional Revolutionary Party	2009–2010; 2010–2012	61st Congress
2012	Rafael Acosta Croda	National Action Party (Mexico)	2012–2015	62nd Congress
2015	Gabriela Ramírez Ramos	National Action Party (Mexico)	2015–2018	63rd Congress
2018	Mariana Dunyaska García Rojas	National Action Party (Mexico)	2018–2021	64th Congress
2021	María Josefina Gamboa Torales	National Action Party (Mexico)	2021–2024	65th Congress
2024	Rosa Hernández Espejo	National Regeneration Movement	2024–2027	66th Congress

== Presidential elections ==
Veracruz's 12th district
Election	District won by	Party or coalition	%
2018	Andrés Manuel López Obrador	Juntos Haremos Historia	42.7847
2024	Claudia Sheinbaum Pardo	Sigamos Haciendo Historia	60.0419
