= Gustavo Carvajal Moreno =

Mexican politician

President of the Chamber of Deputies
- In office 11 June 1992 – 31 October 1992
- Preceded by: Juan Moisés Calleja García
- Succeeded by: María de los Ángeles Moreno

Secretariat of Agrarian Reform
- In office 19 March 1981 – 30 November 1982
- President: José López Portillo
- Preceded by: Javier García Paniagua
- Succeeded by: Luis Martínez Villicaña

President of the Institutional Revolutionary Party
- In office 1979 – 19 March 1981
- Preceded by: Carlos Sansores Pérez
- Succeeded by: Javier García Paniagua

Personal details
- Born: 1939 Veracruz, Mexico
- Died: 25 February 2017 (aged 77–78) Mexico City, Mexico
- Party: Institutional Revolutionary

Gustavo Carvajal Moreno (1939 – 25 February 2017) was a Mexican politician and member of the Institutional Revolutionary Party (PRI), of which he became president. He also served as secretary of agrarian reform, a senator, and a federal deputy.

He was the son of Ángel Carvajal Bernal, who was Governor of Veracruz from 1948 to 1950.

Carvajal Moreno became president of the PRI in 1979, replacing Carlos Sansores Pérez, where he stayed until Javier García Paniagua took the spot in 1981. That same day, he was named to the cabinet of José López Portillo as secretary of agrarian reform.

In the 1991 mid-terms he was elected to the Chamber of Deputies to represent Veracruz's 22nd district during the 55th session of Congress. He was elected senator for the state of Veracruz in the 1994 general election and served from 1994 to 2000 during the 56th and 57th sessions of Congress. Finally, he was elected a plurinominal deputy for the 58th session (2000–2003).
