= Secretary of Fisheries (Mexico) =

In Mexico the Secretary of Fisheries was the head of the Secretariat of Fisheries (Secretaría de Pesca, SEPESCA). The secretary was a member of the presidential cabinet.

In 1994 President Ernesto Zedillo Ponce de León merged the Secretariat of Fisheries and the Secretariat of the Environment to create the Secretariat of the Environment, Natural Resources and Fisheries (Secretaría del Medio Ambiente, Recursos Naturales y Pesca, SEMARNAP), which itself was later replaced by the Secretariat of the Environment and Natural Resources (SEMARNAT) in 2000.

The last three Secretaries of Fisheries were:

- Pedro Ojeda Paullada (1982–1988)
- María de los Ángeles Moreno (1988–1991)
- Guillermo Jiménez Morales (1991–1994)
