= María Victoria Gutiérrez Lagunes =

Mexican politician

- Born: 15 June 1964 (age 61); Veracruz, Mexico
- Occupation: Politician
- Political party: PAN

María Victoria Gutiérrez Lagunes (born 15 June 1964) is a Mexican politician from the National Action Party (PAN). In the 2006 general election she was elected to the Chamber of Deputies to represent Veracruz's 12th congressional district during the 60th session of Congress.
