= Javier García Paniagua =

Mexican politician

Secretary of Labor and Social Welfare
- In office 14 October 1981 – 28 December 1981
- President: José López Portillo
- Preceded by: Pedro Ojeda Paullada
- Succeeded by: Sergio García Ramírez

President of the Institutional Revolutionary Party
- In office 18 March 1981 – 14 October 1981
- Preceded by: Gustavo Carvajal Moreno
- Succeeded by: Pedro Ojeda Paullada

Secretary of Agrarian Reform of Mexico
- In office 25 April 1980 – 18 March 1981
- President: José López Portillo
- Preceded by: Antonio Toledo Corro
- Succeeded by: Gustavo Carvajal Moreno

Personal details
- Born: 13 February 1935 Autlán de Navarro, Jalisco
- Died: 25 November 1998 (aged 63)
- Party: PRI
- Spouse: María Sorté (1978–1998; his death)
- Children: 2; Omar & Adrian García Harfuch
- Parent: Marcelino García Barragán (father)

Javier García Paniagua (Note: In this Spanish name, the first or paternal surname is García and the second or maternal family name is Paniagua.) (13 February 1935 – 25 November 1998) was a Mexican politician who served as president of the Institutional Revolutionary Party (PRI) in 1981 and held positions in the cabinet of President José López Portillo as Secretary of Agrarian Reform and Secretary of Labor and Social Welfare.

His name was frequently mentioned among the possible candidates to serve as President of Mexico for the 1982–88 term, but ultimately López Portillo chose Miguel de la Madrid to contend for the PRI in the 1982 general election.

He died in his native Jalisco on 25 November 1998.

== Family ==
His father was Marcelino García Barragán. He married María Sorté, born María Harfuch Hidalgo. He was the father of Omar García Harfuch, the Secretary of Security and Civilian Protection in the cabinet of President Claudia Sheinbaum.
