= Secretariat of Agrarian Reform =

Secretariat of State of Mexico

- Secretaría de la Reforma Agraria
- Official seal and emblem

Agency overview
- Formed: 1970; Dissolution 2013
- Superseding agency: Secretariat of Agrarian, Land, and Urban Development
- Jurisdiction: Federal government of Mexico
- Headquarters: Mexico City
- Employees: 800 (2006)
- Annual budget: US$387 million (2019)
- Agency executive: Jorge Carlos Ramirez Martín, Secretary
- Website: www.gob.mx/sra

The Mexican Secretariat of Agrarian Reform (Spanish: Secretaría de la Reforma Agraria, SRA) was a Secretariat in the cabinet of Mexico. It was created under the Organic Law of the Federal Public Administration, where Article 41 corresponds to the exercise of the functions and powers expressly stated in Article 27 of the Constitution of Mexico, which establishes the right of farm workers to own the land they work on.

By 2013, the Secretariat of Agrarian Reform was replaced by the Secretariat of Agrarian, Land, and Urban Development.

== Organization chart ==
To carry out these functions, the Agrarian Reform Secretariat has the following units:

- Undersecretariat for Rural Property Management
- Undersecretariat for Sector Policy
- Legal Affairs Unit

=== Decentralized administrative bodies and entities ===
To carry out these functions, the Secretariat has the following units:

- National Agrarian Registry
- Agrarian Attorney's Office
- National Trust Fund for Popular Rooms
- National Land Development Fund Trust
- Commission for the Regularization of Land Tenure
- National Housing Commission
- Support Fund for Unregulated Agrarian Nuclei

== List of secretaries of agrarian reform of Mexico ==
- Government of Luis Echeverría (1970–1976)
  - (1975): Augusto Gómez Villanueva
  - (1975–1976): Félix Barra García
- Government of José López Portillo (1976–1982)
  - (1976–1978): Jorge Rojo Lugo
  - (1978–1980): Antonio Toledo Corro
  - (1980–1981): Javier García Paniagua
  - (1981–1982): Gustavo Carvajal Moreno
- Government of Miguel de la Madrid (1982–1988)
  - (1982–1986): Luis Martínez Villicaña
  - (1986–1988): Rafael Rodríguez Barrera
- Government of Carlos Salinas de Gortari (1988–1994)
  - (1988–1994): Víctor Cervera Pacheco
- Government of Ernesto Zedillo (1994–2000)
  - (1994–1995): Miguel Limón Rojas
  - (1995–1999): Arturo Warman Gryj
  - (1999–2000): Eduardo Robledo Rincón
- Government of Vicente Fox (2000–2006)
  - (2000–2003): María Teresa Herrera Tello
  - (2003–2006): Florencio Salazar Adame
  - (2006) Abelardo Escobar Prieto
- Cabinet of Felipe Calderón Hinojosa (2006–2012)
  - (2006–2012): Abelardo Escobar Prieto
- Cabinet of Enrique Peña Nieto (2012–2018)
  - (2012–2013): Jorge Carlos Ramírez Marín
