= Elba Esther Gordillo =

Mexican union leader and politician (born 1945)

Elba Esther Gordillo Morales
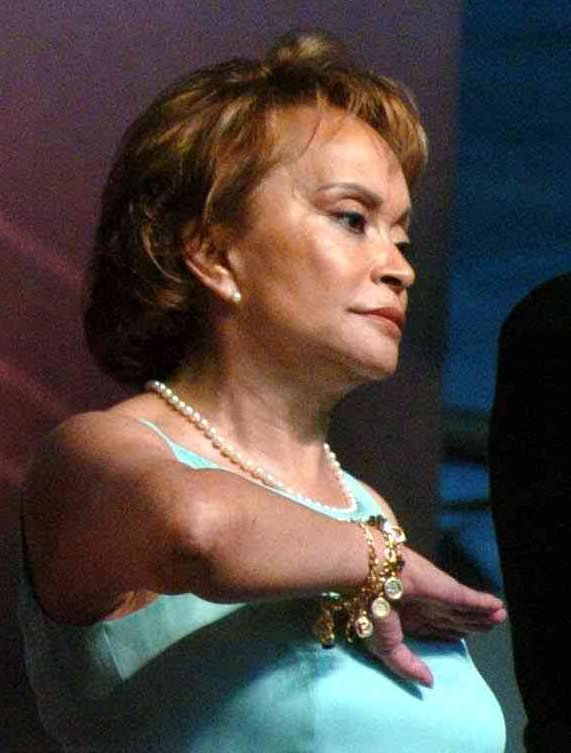
- Elba Esther Gordillo

General Secretary of the Institutional Revolutionary Party
- In office 5 February 2002 – 30 August 2005
- President: Roberto Madrazo
- Preceded by: Sergio García Ramírez
- Succeeded by: César Augusto Santiago

President of the Chamber of Deputies
- In office 1 September 1987 – 30 September 1987
- Preceded by: Reyes Rodolfo Flores
- Succeeded by: Santiago Oñate Laborde

Member of the Chamber of Deputies for the Federal District's 2nd district
- In office 1 September 1985 – 31 August 1988
- Preceded by: Rodolfo García Pérez
- Succeeded by: Onofre Hernández Rivera

Member of the Chamber of Deputies for the State of Mexico's 26th district
- In office 1 September 1979 – 31 August 1982

Personal details
- Born: 6 February 1945 (age 81) Comitán, Chiapas
- Citizenship: Mexico
- Party: New Alliance Party (PANAL)
- Children: Mónica Arriola Gordillo
- Relatives: René Fujiwara (grandson)
- Occupation: National Education Workers' Union leader
- Known for: Embezzlement, organized crime

Elba Esther Gordillo Morales (Spanish pronunciation: [elβaesˈteɾ ɣoɾˈðiʝo]; 6 February 1945) is a Mexican politician and trade unionist who has been the leader of the 1.4-million-strong National Education Workers' Union (Sindicato Nacional de Trabajadores de la Educación, or SNTE), the largest labor union in Latin America, since 1989. She was formerly affiliated with the Institutional Revolutionary Party (Partido Revolucionario Institucional, or PRI) until 2005, when she left and founded the New Alliance Party (Partido Nueva Alianza, or PANAL), which is currently led by Luis Castro Obregón.

Gordillo was arrested by the Mexican authorities on 26 February 2013 on charges of embezzlement and organized crime. She was included in a list of the "10 most corrupt Mexicans" published by Forbes in 2013.

Gordillo has held considerable influence over governments and individual presidents by persuading her union members to vote as a single bloc.

== Early life ==
Elba Esther Gordillo was born on 6 February 1945, in Comitán, Chiapas.

== Career ==
Gordillo joined the Institutional Revolutionary Party (PRI) in 1970, at the height of its "dirty war". She has occupied several PRI positions including Secretary of Organization of the National Executive Council (1986–1987), General Secretary of the Council of National Popular Organizations (1997–2002), and General Secretary of the National Executive Council, the second highest position within the party.

Gordillo then became one of the most powerful women in Mexican politics. Elected to the Chamber of Deputies for the DF's 2nd district in 1985, she was the President of the Chamber of Deputies in 1987. She was the head of the PRI faction in the Chamber of Deputies, but after a political war with Roberto Madrazo, she lost that position when a slim majority of 118 PRI deputies voted to oust Gordillo as head of their 224-seat faction in the lower house. Gordillo was forced out of the congress leadership presumably because her political ambitions clashed with those of Madrazo regarding the presidential elections of 2006. Heightened political pressure and illness pushed Gordillo out from public life for about a year, though she did hold on to her post as the PRI general secretary.

In early 2005 Gordillo returned to public life and Roberto Madrazo greeted her with open arms. According to PRI rules, Gordillo, as secretary general of the party, should have replaced Madrazo when he stepped down; but, in a surprise move, Mariano Palacios Alcocer took Madrazo's position instead of Gordillo, who publicly broke with Madrazo just few days before Palacios Alcocer's election. Gordillo accused Madrazo of trying to bribe her with the party's presidency in exchange for supporting his candidacy; she also said that Madrazo had no respect for democracy and just wanted to assure himself of the nomination and was breaking party rules to impose a party leader of his own choosing.

The day that Mariano Palacios Alcocer was back, Gordillo filed a complaint with a federal electoral tribunal asking for protection of her political rights, but the tribunal ruled against her. On 19 September and as a result of the dispute with Madrazo, Gordillo resigned her general secretary position in the PRI but decided to continue her affiliation with the party. On 13 July 2006, two weeks after the federal elections, the PRI announced her expulsion from its ranks for having supported the National Action Party (PAN) and for attacking and slandering the PRI's leaders and candidates.

=== Corruption ===
Gordillo holds significant powers from the national public schools system dominated by her union in which teaching positions could be sold or inherited. There are roughly 1.5 million teachers in this union which she has controlled since 1989. In 2008, she was reportedly caught on camera having bought 59 new Hummer vehicles to give her aides, only to raffle them off when the media brought the purchase to light.

Gordillo is notorious for wearing luxury brands such as Hermès and Chanel. She has allegedly spent US$2.1 million at a Neiman Marcus department store in San Diego between March 2009 and January 2012. Gordillo allegedly used the money on properties, including in the US, a private jet, art work and plastic surgeries. She has allegedly amassed some 10 properties, including a US$1.7 million home in San Diego and a $4 million water-front house in Coronado, California.

Gordillo allegedly set up a political party that followed principles of a patronage system in 2005 that became notorious for obtaining privileges and appointments in return of its support in key elections. It was widely speculated that she helped Felipe Calderón obtain his narrow victory for the presidency in 2006 as part of a deal that allowed her to place individuals in the government who held allegiances to her.

The former union leader was formally charged in February 2013 with embezzling US$200 million from the union to fund her lavish lifestyle. She is notorious for her expensive Hermès bags as well as numerous plastic surgeries from clinics in California. She is believed to own or be connected to three residences in California. One of these, where she spent most of her time before her arrest, was a $4.7 million house in Coronado Cays with a private dock, a boat, and Jet Ski.

Gordillo was arrested on corruption charges by the Mexican authorities on 26 February 2013 after her private jet in which she had travelled from California landed at the Toluca airport near the capital. She was arrested for allegedly embezzling 2 billion pesos (US$156,816,000 or €119,242,600) from the Mexican National Educational Workers Union (SNTE), according to Attorney General Jesús Murillo Karam. She also allegedly wired large sums of money to Swiss bank accounts, while other funds were used for plastic surgeries or personal luxuries. Among other questionable expenditures, according to Murillo Karam, were the maintenance and rental expenses of a hangar and aircraft. Prosecutors argue she would not have been able to make several purchases on her salary. (31,398 pesos or US$2,459 per month.) She has been charged with embezzlement and organized crime. To head her criminal defense, Gordillo hired prominent penal lawyer Marco Antonio del Toro Carazo who is also defending labor leader Napoleón Gómez Urrutia.

== Liberation ==
Gordillo was liberated after a federal judge from the Primer Tribunal Unitario dismissed the trial on the grounds of not being able to prove Gordillo's responsibility for embezzlement.

== See also ==
- Education in Mexico
