= Julio Horacio Lujambio =

Mexican politician

- Born: 5 September 1945 (age 80); Mexico City, Mexico
- Occupation: Politician
- Political party: PVEM

Julio Horacio Lujambio Moreno (born 5 September 1945) is a Mexican politician affiliated with the Ecologist Green Party of Mexico (PVEM). In the 2003 mid-terms he was elected to the Chamber of Deputies to represent the State of Mexico's 27th district during the 59th session of Congress.
