= Alfonso Guillermo Bravo y Mier =

Mexican politician

- Born: 21 January 1947 (age 79); State of Mexico, Mexico
- Occupation: Politician
- Political party: PAN

Alfonso Guillermo Bravo y Mier (born 21 January 1947) is a Mexican politician from the National Action Party (PAN). From 2000 to 2003, he served in the Chamber of Deputies to represent the State of Mexico's 27th district during the 58th session of Congress.
