= 27th federal electoral district of the State of Mexico =

Federal electoral district of Mexico

State of Mexico's 27th
- Electoral district of the Chamber of Deputies of Mexico

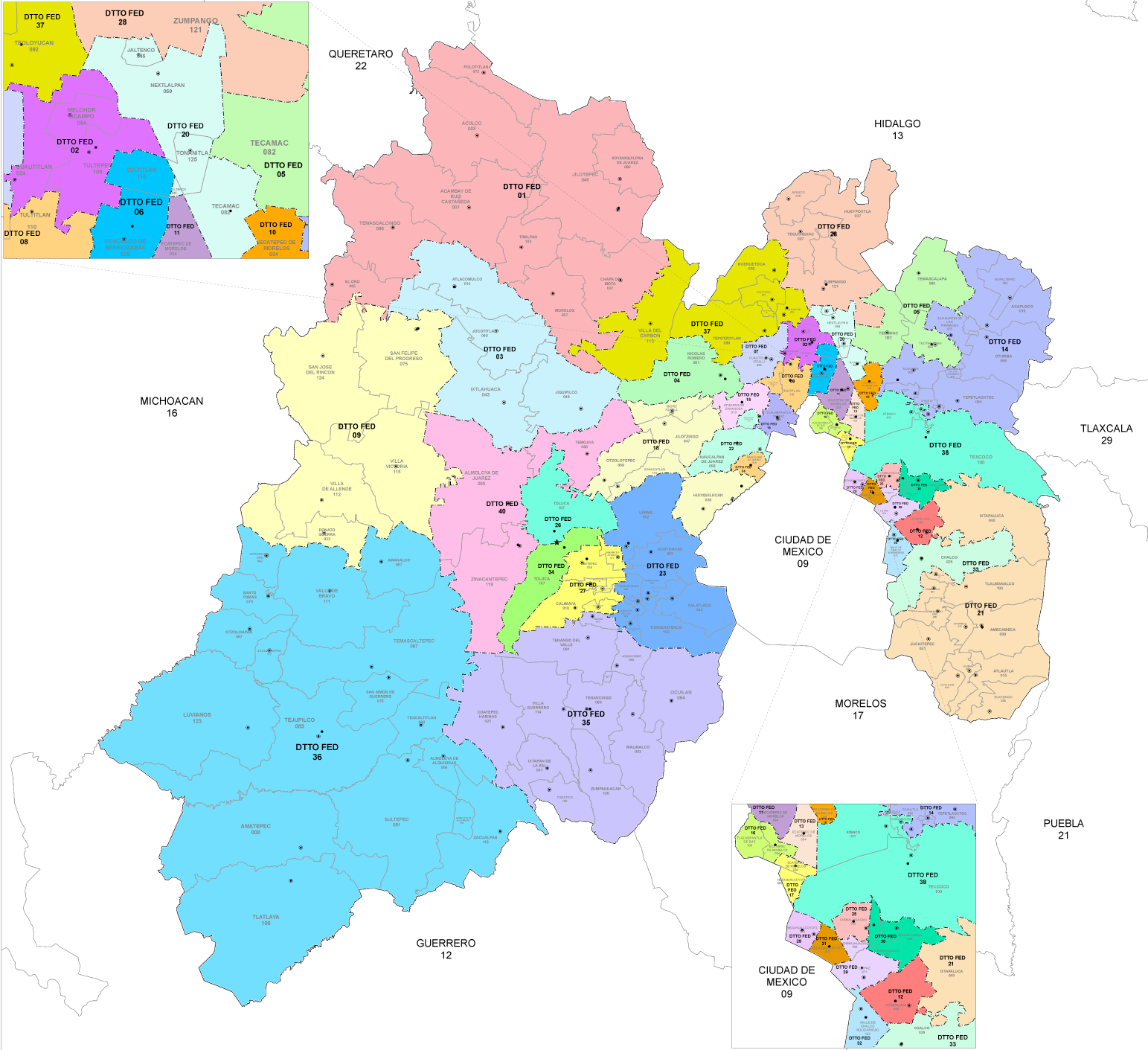
- State of Mexico's districts since 2023

Incumbent
- Member: Wblester Santiago Pineda
- Party: ▌Labour Party
- Congress: 66th (2024–2027)

District
- State: State of Mexico
- Head town: Metepec
- Coordinates: 19°15′N 99°36′W
- Covers: Calimaya, Chapultepec, Metepec, Mexicaltzingo, San Antonio la Isla, San Mateo Atenco
- PR region: Fifth
- Precincts: 134
- Population: 465,912 (2020 census)

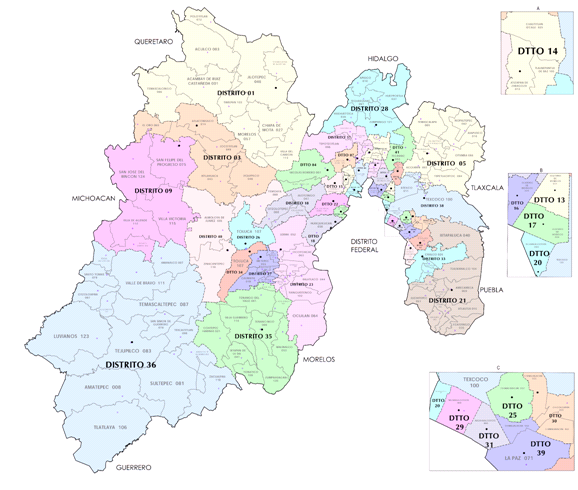
2017–2022 districting scheme

The 27th federal electoral district of the State of Mexico (Spanish: Distrito electoral federal 27 del Estado de México) is one of the 300 electoral districts into which Mexico is divided for elections to the federal Chamber of Deputies and one of 40 such districts in the State of Mexico.

It elects one deputy to the lower house of Congress for each three-year legislative session by means of the first-past-the-post system. Votes cast in the district also count towards the calculation of proportional representation ("plurinominal") deputies elected from the fifth region.

The 27th district was created by the 1977 electoral reforms, which increased the number of single-member seats in the Chamber of Deputies from 196 to 300. Under that plan, the State of Mexico's seat allocation rose from 15 to 34. The new districts were first contended in the 1979 mid-term election.

The current member for the district, elected in the 2024 general election, is Wblester Santiago Pineda of the Labour Party (PT).

== District territory ==
Under the 2023 districting plan adopted by the National Electoral Institute (INE), which is to be used for the 2024, 2027 and 2030 federal elections, the 27th district is located in the Toluca Valley and covers 134 electoral precincts (secciones electorales) across six of the state's 125 municipalities:

- Calimaya, Chapultepec, Metepec, Mexicaltzingo, San Antonio la Isla and San Mateo Atenco.

The head town (cabecera distrital), where results from individual polling stations are gathered together and tallied, is the city of Metepec. In the 2020 census, the district reported a total population of 465,912.

== Previous districting schemes ==
Evolution of electoral district numbers
	1974	1978	1996	2005	2017	2023
State of Mexico	15	34	36	40	41	40
Chamber of Deputies	196	300				

Under the previous districting plans enacted by the INE and its predecessors, the 27th district was situated as follows:

2005–2022

The district kept the same configuration under both the 2005 and 2017 plans. It covered the municipalities of Calimaya, Chapultepec, Metepec, Mexicaltzingo, San Antonio la Isla and San Mateo Atenco, and the head town was at Metepec.

1996–2005

The municipalities of Lerma, Metepec, Mexicaltzingo, Ocoyoacac and San Mateo Atenco. The head town was at Metepec.

1978–1996

A portion of the municipality of Nezahualcóyotl.

== Deputies returned to Congress ==
(Mexico) National parties
- Current
- PAN
- PRI
- PT
- PVEM
- MC
- Morena
- PAZ
- Somos
- Defunct or local only
- PLM
- PNR
- PRM
- PNM
- PP
- PPS
- PARM
- PFCRN
- CON
- PANAL
- PSD
- PES
- PES
- PRD

State of Mexico's 27th district
Election	Deputy	Party	Term	Legislature
1979	José Ignacio Pichardo Pagaza	Institutional Revolutionary Party	1979–1982	51st Congress
1982	Carlos Barrios Honey	Institutional Revolutionary Party	1982–1985	52nd Congress
1985	Ricardo Regalado Hernández	Institutional Revolutionary Party	1985–1988	53rd Congress
1988	Mauricio Valdés Rodríguez	Institutional Revolutionary Party	1988–1991	54th Congress
1991	Jorge René Flores Solano	Institutional Revolutionary Party	1991–1994	55th Congress
1994	Israel Reyes Ledezma Magaña	Institutional Revolutionary Party	1994–1997	56th Congress
1997	Manuel González Espinoza	Institutional Revolutionary Party	1997–2000	57th Congress
2000	Alfonso Guillermo Bravo y Mier	National Action Party (Mexico)	2000–2003	58th Congress
2003	Julio Horacio Lujambio Moreno	Ecologist Green Party of Mexico	2003–2006	59th Congress
2006	Luis Xavier Maawad Robert	National Action Party (Mexico)	2006–2009	60th Congress
2009	Miguel Ángel Terrón Mendoza	Institutional Revolutionary Party	2009–2012	61st Congress
2012	Laura Barrera Fortoul	Institutional Revolutionary Party	2012–2015	62nd Congress
2015	Carolina Monroy del Mazo	Institutional Revolutionary Party	2015–2018	63rd Congress
2018	Óscar González Yáñez	Labour Party (Mexico)	2018–2021	64th Congress
2021	Ana Lilia Herrera Anzaldo	Institutional Revolutionary Party	2021–2024	65th Congress
2024	Wblester Santiago Pineda	Labour Party (Mexico)	2024–2027	66th Congress

== Presidential elections ==
State of Mexico's 27th district
Election	District won by	Party or coalition	%
2018	Andrés Manuel López Obrador	Juntos Haremos Historia	47.6688
2024	Claudia Sheinbaum Pardo	Sigamos Haciendo Historia	49.5743
