= Irma Cué Sarquis =

Mexican lawyer and politician

Minister of the Supreme Court of Justice of the Nation
- In office October 28, 1987 – December 31, 1994
- President: Miguel de la Madrid

Member of the Chamber of Deputies
- In office September 1, 1982 – August 31, 1985
- Preceded by: Gonzalo Vázquez Bravo
- Constituency: Veracruz district 12

President of the Chamber of Deputies
- In office September 1, 1983 – September 30, 1983
- Preceded by: Mariano Piña Olaya
- Succeeded by: Víctor Cervera Pacheco

Personal details
- Born: May 7, 1938 (age 88) Tierra Blanca, Veracruz, Mexico
- Party: Institutional Revolutionary Party
- Education: National Autonomous University of Mexico
- Occupation: Lawyer, politician, professor

Irma Cué Sarquis (born May 7, 1938), also known by her married name, Irma Cué de Duarte, is a Mexican lawyer and politician from the Institutional Revolutionary Party (PRI). She has held several public offices, including federal deputy and Minister of the Supreme Court of Justice of the Nation.

== Early life and education ==
Irma Cué Sarquis was born in Tierra Blanca, Veracruz, on May 7, 1938. She completed her basic studies there, and subsequently attended high school in Orizaba and preparatory in Mexico City. From 1955 to 1959, she studied for a licentiate in law at the National Autonomous University of Mexico (UNAM), graduating on October 1, 1964, with the thesis Algunas consideraciones sobre el juicio de amparo (Some Considerations on the Amparo Trial).

She was Chair of Commercial Law of UNAM's School of Commerce and Administration in 1959.

== Public career ==
Cué began her professional career as an agent of the public prosecution service from 1960 to 1961. From 1967 to 1974, she was assistant to the Director General of Tax Studies of the Secretariat of Finance and Public Credit. At this time she began her friendship with Miguel de la Madrid, who later became president of Mexico. From 1974 to 1976 she served as Director of Legal Consulting of the National Council of Science and Technology (CONACYT), and from 1977 to 1982 she was General Legal Director of the General Coordination of Administrative Studies of the Presidency of the Republic.

In 1982, Cué was the PRI candidate for federal deputy for the 12th district of Veracruz. She was elected to the 62nd session of Congress, and held the secretariat of the Programming and Budget Commission. She was appointed President of the Chamber of Deputies for the month of September 1983, coinciding with the response to the first government report of President Miguel de la Madrid.

In 1984 she was appointed general secretary of the PRI's national executive committee, serving under party presidents Adolfo Lugo Verduzco and Jorge de la Vega Domínguez and becoming the first woman to occupy this position. She left the general secretariat in 1987 when she moved to the general legal subdirectorate of the Institute for Social Security and Services for State Workers (ISSSTE).

On October 28, 1987, she was appointed Supernumerary Minister of the Supreme Court of Justice at the nomination of Miguel de la Madrid, assigned to the Auxiliary Chamber. She remained in office until December 31, 1994, when she was forced into retirement as a result of that year's reform of the Judicial Branch.

Subsequently, Cué held advisory positions at several public institutions, such as Pemex and ISSSTE. She retired from professional practice until March 22, 2016, when it was announced that she had been nominated by the PRI as the top candidate for deputy to the Constituent Assembly of Mexico City.

== Awards and recognitions ==
- 1980 – Research Award from the President of the Republic
- 1981 – Prize of Merit in Public Administration from the National Association of Lawyers
- 1982 – Second place for the National Public Administration Prize
- 1987 – Prize of Legislative Merit and Forum Prize of Mexico from the National Association of Lawyers
- 2017 – General Lázaro Cárdenas del Río Prize for Democratic Merit from the PRI

== Publications ==
- La empresa pública en México (1970)
- Regulación Constitucional de las empresas públicas (1980)
- Control Legislativo de las Empresas (1981)
- La Suprema Corte de Justicia de la Nación: propuesta legislativa de reorganización (1984)
- Formulación de políticas para incrementar la participación de la mujer en la administración pública (1990), ISBN 9789688422120
