= Miguel Ángel Terrón =

Mexican politician

- Born: 7 January 1961 (age 65); State of Mexico, Mexico
- Occupation: Politician
- Political party: PRI

Miguel Ángel Terrón Mendoza (born 7 January 1961) is a Mexican politician from the Institutional Revolutionary Party (PRI). From 2009 to 2012 he served in the Chamber of Deputies representing the State of Mexico's 27th district during the 61st session of Congress.
