= Morbo (album) =

Studio album by Morbo
- Released: December 4, 2001
- Recorded: Chez Jacobo Zaidenweber; Mexico City; Cuarto de Máquinas; Mexico City
- Genres: Synth pop; Electropop; alternative rock; Dark wave; Electronic; electronic rock; EDM
- Length: 38:58
- Language: Spanish
- Label: EMI
- Producers: Juan Carlos Lozano; Paco Huidobro

Morbo chronology
Morbo (2001)	Electroguitarpop (2005)

Professional ratings
Review scores
Source	Rating
Allmusic	4/5 stars

Morbo is Mexican electronica band Morbo's eponymous debut album issued by EMI Music in December 2001.

The track 'Tengo de ti' was originally released in 1992 on Mœnia's failed attempted self-titled debut album known to others as 'El disco perdido' (The Missing album).

== Track listing ==
#	Title	Length
01.	"Ya pasará" • Music & lyric: Juan Carlos Lozano, Alejandro Lozano, Alejandro Ortega, Jorge Soto	4:29
02.	"Enséñame" • Music & lyric: Juan Carlos Lozano, Alejandro Lozano	3:44
03.	"No es lo mismo" • Music & lyric: Juan Carlos Lozano, Alejandro Lozano	3:14
04.	"Hoy" • Music & lyric: Juan Carlos Lozano	4:09
05.	"No me encontré" • Music & lyric: Juan Carlos Lozano	4:25
06.	"Por ti" • Music & lyric: Juan Carlos Lozano	3:28
07.	"Falaz" • Music & lyric: Juan Carlos Lozano	4:34
08.	"Acércame" • Music & lyric: Juan Carlos Lozano, Alejandro Lozano	3:14
09.	"Se me acaba" • Music & lyric: Juan Carlos Lozano	3:53
10.	"Tengo de ti" • Music & lyric: Juan Carlos Lozano, Alfonso Pichardo, Jorge Soto	3:34

== Personnel ==
=== Performing ===
- Juan Carlos Lozano – vocals, guitar
- Jay de la Cueva – percussion, bass
- Paco Huidobro – drums, guitar
- Fanny Chernitsky – backing vocals
- String ensemble
  - Beata Kukawska – violin
  - Oleg Gouk – violin
  - Carlos Rosas Bernal – violin
  - Veronica Medina – violin
  - Mikhail Gourfinkel – viola

=== Technical ===
- Juan Carlos Lozano – record production, audio engineering
- Paco Huidobro – record production
- Jack Chernytzky – musical advising
- Joe Chiccarelli – audio mixing
- Alejandro Giacomán – audio mixing, audio engineering
- Luis Gil – audio engineering
- Luis Cortés (Cuarto de Máquinas) – sound recording
- José María Surrel – record production assistance

=== Design ===
- Pico A&D – graphic design
- Yvonne Venegas – photography
