= Rafael Acosta Croda =

Mexican politician

- Born: 27 May 1957 (age 68); Veracruz, Veracruz, Mexico
- Occupation: Deputy
- Political party: PAN

Rafael Acosta Croda (born 27 May 1957) is a Mexican politician affiliated with the National Action Party (PAN).

In the 2012 general election he was elected to the Chamber of Deputies to represent Veracruz's 12th congressional district during the 62nd Congress. In the 7 July 2013 state elections he ran for mayor of Veracruz, where his main opponent was businessman Ramón Poo Gil who won with a margin of 10,000 votes.
