= Morbo (band) =

Mexican musical group

Morbo was a Mexican band formed by Juan Carlos Lozano with Alexander Ortega and Jorge Soto.

Lozano was one of the four founding members of Mœnia, which originally included Juan Carlos Lozano as lead guitarist on their failed 1992 debut album Moenia, later on as lead vocalist on their official eponymous 1996 debut Mœnia and its 1998 companion remix album Mœnia Mixes.

Despite the acclaimed success at the time in a risky and previously unnoticed novelty in the Mexican music industry, and due to disagreements between Lozano, Jorge Soto and Alejandro 'Midi' Ortega as to the creative route Mœnia should take, Lozano decided to leave Mœnia as vocalist with original founding member Alfonso Pichardo returning as lead singer. Lozano then formed the perhaps less commercial, still synth-oriented, but more guitar-centered Morbo, whose musical vision first came to fruition in 2001's eponymous Morbo.

The musical and lyrical vision of Morbo has continued to deepen and evolve with 2005's Electroguitarpop. Both Morbo and Moenia have expressed that both bands are not in competition with one another, since each band's aesthetic visions and realizations are demonstrably different.

== Members ==
- Juan Carlos Lozano
- Yamil Rezc
- Abie Toiber
- Jordi Alcobe

== Discography ==
- Morbo (2001) EMI
- Electroguitarpop (2005) Phoenix
- Este Encanto (Single) (2005) Phoenix
- Nada Haces Por Mi (2011) Unknown
