= Genaro V. Vásquez =

Mexican lawyer

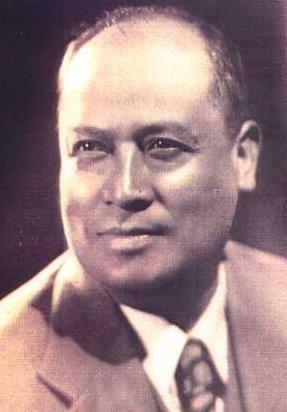
Genaro V Vasquez

Genaro Vicente Vásquez Quiroz (10 July 1892 – 22 May 1967) was a Mexican lawyer. He was born in the city of Oaxaca to a Mixtec father and a Zapotec mother.

Genaro V. Vásquez studied law at the National Autonomous University of Mexico (UNAM). He served as interim governor of Oaxaca from 7 November 1925 to 1 December 1928, as a federal deputy from 1926 to 1928, representing the Federal District's seventh district, and as Attorney-General of the Republic from 1937 to 1940, under President Lázaro Cárdenas.

He also represented Oaxaca in the Senate (1930–1934), served two terms as a justice of the Supreme Court, and was Mexico's plenipotentiary delegate to the seventh International Conference of American States in Montevideo in 1933.

He died in 1967 in either his home state or in Mexico City.
