= Carolina Monroy del Mazo =

Mexican politician

General Secretary of the PRI
- Incumbent
- Assumed office 20 August 2015
- Preceded by: Ivonne Ortega Pacheco

Deputy to the Congress of the Union (State of Mexico's 27th district)
- Incumbent
- Assumed office 1 December 2015
- Preceded by: Arturo Montiel

Municipal president of Metepec
- In office 2012 – 6 January 2015
- Preceded by: Ana Lilia Herrera Anzaldo
- Succeeded by: Rafael Gómez Escalera

Personal details
- Born: 21 August 1962 (age 64) Atlacomulco, State of Mexico, Mexico
- Party: Institutional Revolutionary
- Spouse: Ernesto Nemer Álvarez
- Education: Universidad del Valle de Toluca
- Occupation: Lawyer

Carolina Monroy del Mazo (born 21 August 1962) is a Mexican politician and member of the Institutional Revolutionary Party (PRI). She has served as the general secretary of the PRI and as a federal deputy during the 63rd session of Congress, representing the 27th federal electoral district of the State of Mexico.

== Early life and education ==
Monroy obtained her law degree in 1983 from the Universidad del Valle de Toluca and briefly taught there between 1984 and 1985.

== Career ==
Monroy worked for a wide variety of institutions in the state government, including the Secretariat of Labor and Social Welfare (1982–84), General Secretariat of Government (1984–86), General Directorate of Prevention and Social Readaptation (1988–93), DIF (1993–2000), State Population Council (2000–01), State of Mexico Cultural Institute (2001–05), Social Security Institute of the State of Mexico (2005) and Sistema de Radio y Televisión Mexiquense (2006–09). In 2009, she was named to the state cabinet as the Secretary of Economic Development, a post she held until 2011.

In 2013, voters elected Monroy for the first time, as the municipal president of Metepec. She left the post in 2015 in order to run for the Chamber of Deputies from the 27th district, centered on the city. She serves only on the Gender Equality Commission, having left her post on the Tourism Commission in December 2015.

The late 2000s also saw her PRI party career develop. She served as a state-level political councilor between 2006 and 2009 and as a national councilor between 2014 and 2015. In 2015, she was elected as the PRI's general secretary and was to serve until 2018; after the resignation of Manlio Fabio Beltrones in June 2016, Monroy was tapped to be the party's interim president, a capacity in which she served until Enrique Ochoa Reza became the party's president.

== Personal ==
Monroy is a niece of Alfredo del Mazo González, former Governor of the State of Mexico and Secretary of Energy, and cousin of President Enrique Peña Nieto, who also governed the state; she is married to Ernesto Nemer Álvarez, General Secretary of Government of the State of Mexico and subsecretary of the Secretariat of Social Development.
