= Carolina Gudiño Corro =

Mexican politician

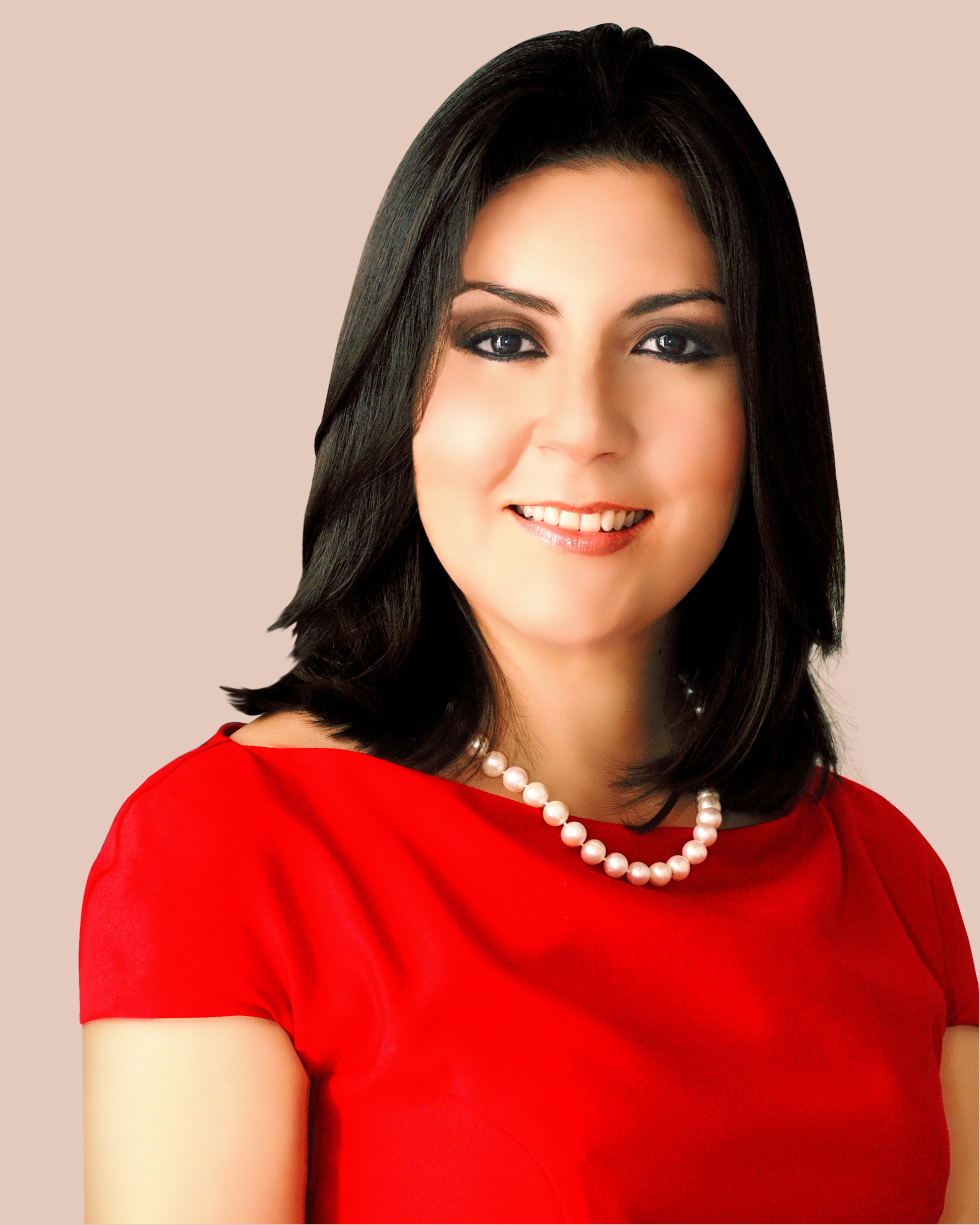
- Born: 19 November 1981 (age 44); Veracruz, Veracruz, Mexico
- Occupation: Politician
- Political party: PRI

Luz Carolina Gudiño Corro (born 19 November 1981) is a Mexican politician from the Institutional Revolutionary Party (PRI). In the 2009 mid-terms she was elected to the Chamber of Deputies to represent Veracruz's 12th congressional district during the 61st Congress.
