= Lydia Madero García =

Mexican politician

- Born: 21 July 1950 (age 76); Monterrey, Nuevo León, Mexico
- Education: Autonomous University of Tamaulipas; University of Texas
- Occupation: Politician
- Political party: PAN

Lydia Madero García (born 21 July 1950) is a Mexican politician affiliated with the National Action Party. She served as Senator of the LVIII and LIX Legislatures of the Mexican Congress representing Tamaulipas and as Deputy of the LV Legislature. At the state level, she served in the LVI Legislature of the Congress of Tamaulipas.
