= Sergio García Ramírez =

Mexican politician (1938–2024)

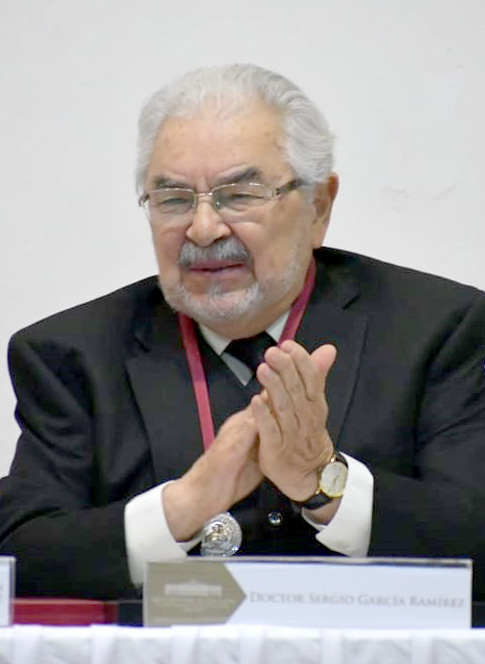
- Ramírez in 2019

President of the Inter-American Court of Human Rights
- In office 2004–2007
- Preceded by: Antônio Augusto Cançado Trindade
- Succeeded by: Cecilia Medina Quiroga

Judge of the Inter-American Court of Human Rights
- In office 1997–2009
- Preceded by: Héctor Fix Zamudio

Attorney General of Mexico
- In office 1 December 1982 – 30 November 1988
- President: Miguel de la Madrid
- Preceded by: Óscar Flores Sánchez
- Succeeded by: Enrique Álvarez del Castillo

Secretary of Labor and Social Welfare
- In office 28 December 1981 – 30 November 1982
- President: José López Portillo
- Preceded by: Javier García Paniagua
- Succeeded by: Arsenio Farell Cubillas

Personal details
- Born: 1 February 1938 Guadalajara, Jalisco, Mexico
- Died: 10 January 2024 (aged 85) Mexico City
- Party: Institutional Revolutionary Party (PRI)
- Education: National Autonomous University of Mexico; UNAM (Juris Doctor)
- Website: Official website

Sergio García Ramírez (1 February 1938 – 10 January 2024) was a Mexican jurist and politician who served as a judge at the Inter-American Court of Human Rights from 1997 to 2009.

Born in Guadalajara, Jalisco, García Ramírez undertook his university studies at the school of law of the National Autonomous University of Mexico (UNAM) in Mexico City. He obtained his bachelor's degree in 1963 with an honorable mention, and he obtained his Ph.D. in 1971, receiving the first magna cum laude awarded for a UNAM Ph.D. in law. He was an official investigator in the Institute of Juridical Investigations and an official professor in the School of Law of the same university. He was a National Investigator, level III, in the National System of Investigators. From 1993 he was a member of the Governing Board of the UNAM.

García Ramírez was a member of the Institutional Revolutionary Party (PRI) from 1961. Although he was never elected to public office, he occupied different positions under the PRI regime and served in the cabinet of President José López Portillo as Secretary of Labor (1981–1982) and then in the cabinet of President Miguel de la Madrid as Attorney General (1982–1988). In 1988 he lost the PRI internal bid for the party presidential candidacy against Carlos Salinas de Gortari.

García Ramírez died in Mexico City on 10 January 2024, at the age of 85.

Legal offices
Preceded by Antônio Augusto Cançado Trindade	President of the Inter-American Court of Human Rights; 2004–2007	Succeeded by Cecilia Medina Quiroga
Preceded by —	Judge of the Inter-American Court of Human Rights; 2004–2009	Succeeded by —
Preceded by Óscar Flores Sánchez	Attorney General; 1982–1988	Succeeded by Enrique Álvarez del Castillo
