= Cristina Díaz =

Mexican lawyer and politician

María Cristina Díaz Salazar
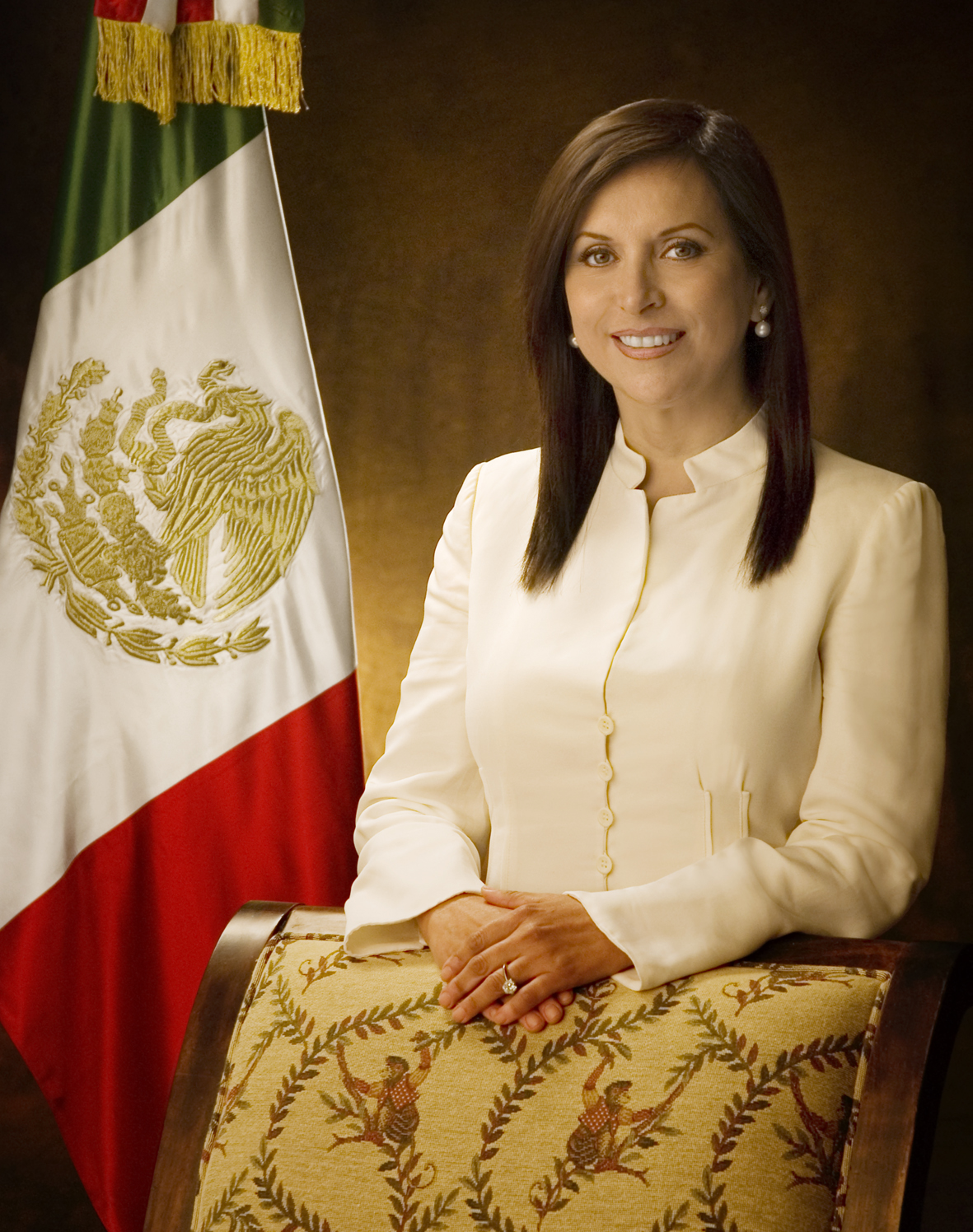

General Secretary of the Institutional Revolutionary Party
- Incumbent
- Assumed office 30 November 2012
- Preceded by: Ricardo Aguilar Castillo

President of the Institutional Revolutionary Party
- In office 2 December 2011 – 8 December 2011
- Preceded by: Humberto Moreira
- Succeeded by: Pedro Joaquín Coldwell

Personal details
- Born: 17 September 1958 (age 67) Monterrey, Nuevo León, Mexico
- Party: PRI
- Occupation: Politician

María Cristina Díaz Salazar (born 17 September 1958) is a Mexican lawyer and politician affiliated with the Institutional Revolutionary Party (PRI). She is a former municipal president (mayor) of Guadalupe, Nuevo León. From 2018 to 2018 she served as a national-list senator.

== Education and professional career ==
Díaz Salazar studied law at the Universidad Autónoma de Nuevo León (UANL). She is an active member of the PRI who has occupied various positions inside her party including president of the PRI in Nuevo León. She has served as advisor for the IMSS, head of the National Institute of Migration in Nuevo León, local deputy in the Congress of Nuevo León. She was also elected to the Chamber of Deputies of Mexico during the 56th (Nuevo León's 9th), 59th (plurinominal) and 61st (Nuevo León's 11th) sessions of Congress.

In 2006 she was elected to serve as municipal president (mayor) of the municipality of Guadalupe and, in the 2012 general election, she was elected to the Senate from the PRI's national list.

== Duties in the Institutional Revolutionary Party ==
She was the general secretary of the PRI, until 2 December 2011. After the resignation of Humberto Moreira as President of the Institutional Revolutionary Party, she became the interim president of the party; but when Pedro Joaquín Coldwell took office as president of the party, she became the general secretary of the party again on 8 December 2011.
