= 2012 Federal District (Mexico) election =

Local election in Mexico

2012 election for Head of Government of the Federal District
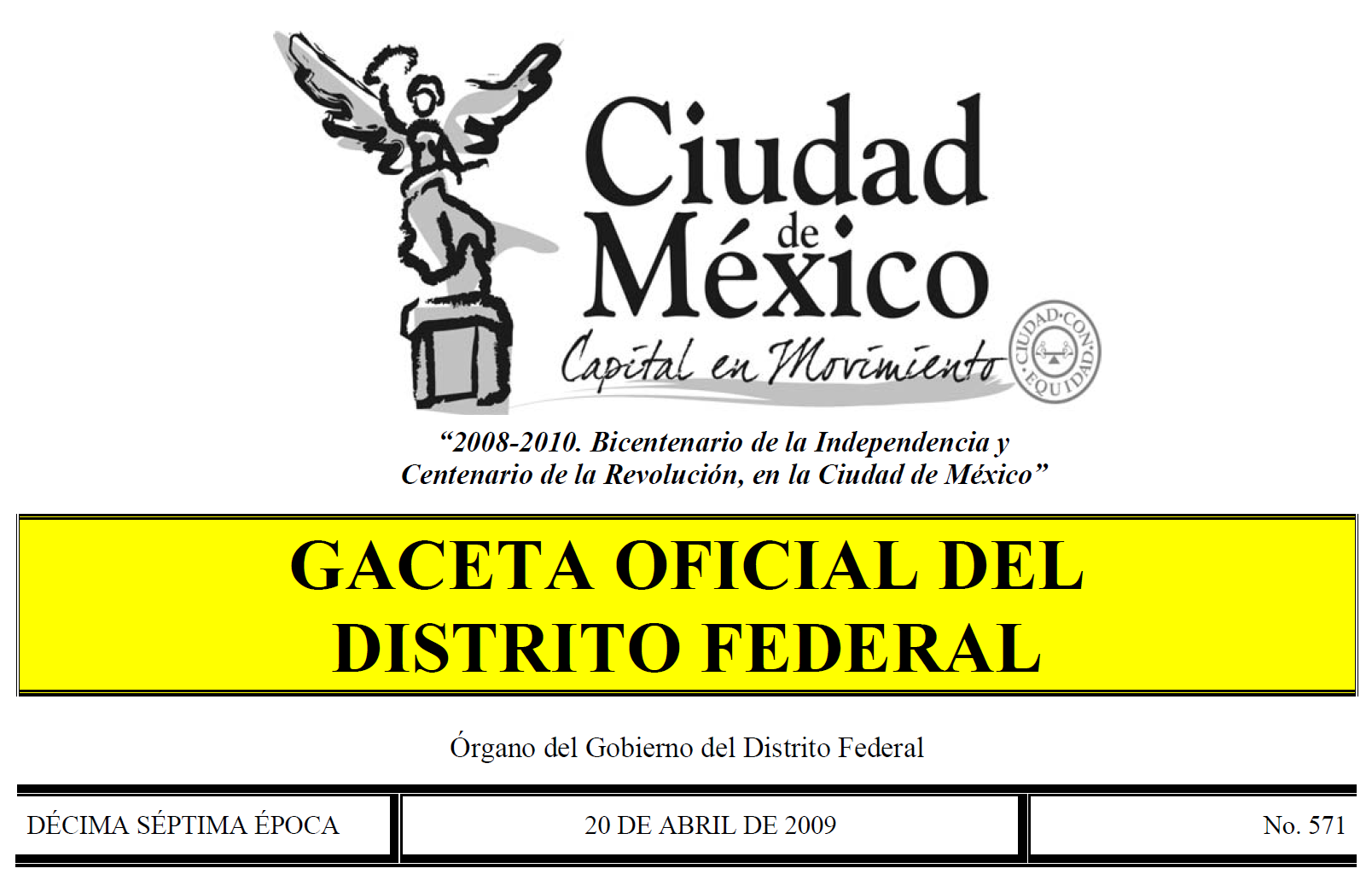
- 1 July 2012
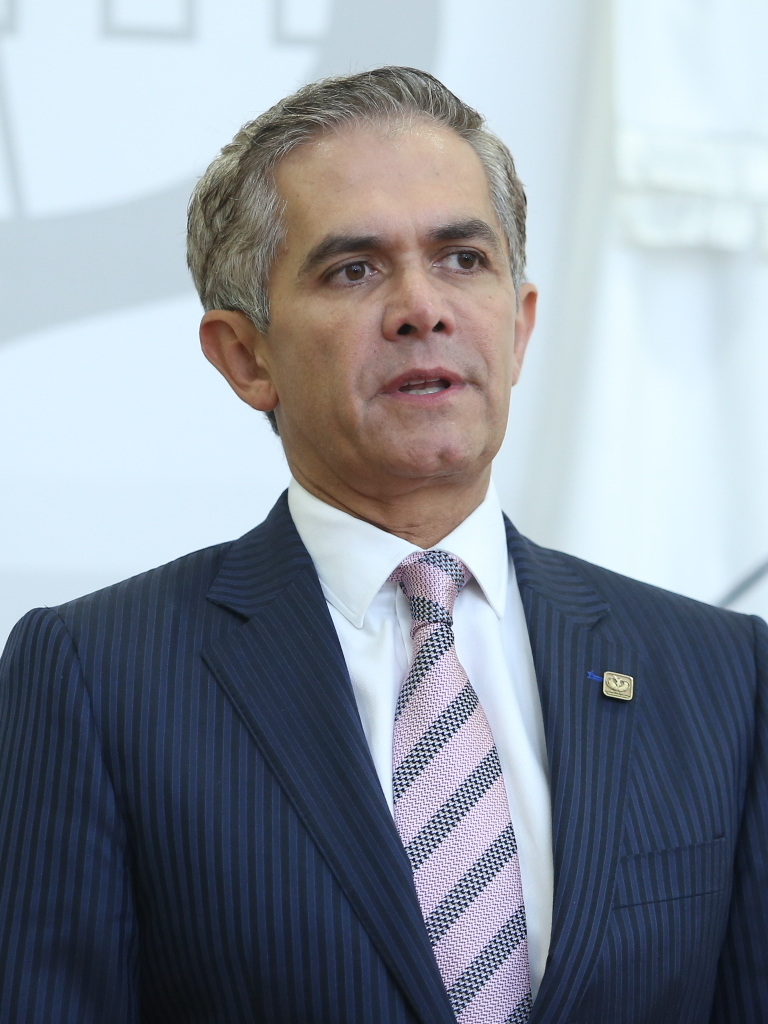

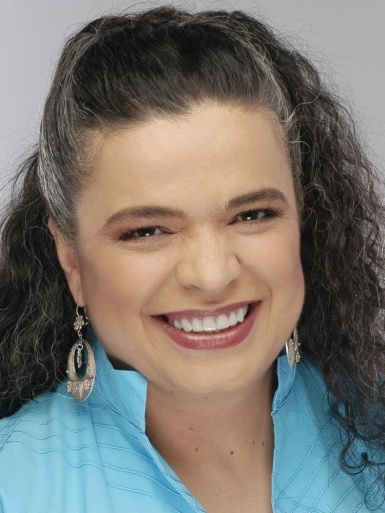

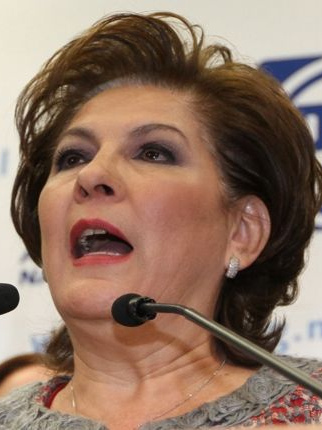
| Nominee | Miguel Ángel Mancera | Beatriz Paredes Rangel | Isabel Miranda de Wallace |
| Party | PRD | PRI | PAN |
| Popular vote | 3,028,704 | 941,139 | 648,856 |
| Percentage | 63.56% | 19.75% | 13.62% |
- Results of the election by local district. Yellow denotes districts won by Miguel Ángel Mancera.
Head of Government before election
Marcelo Ebrard
PRD
Elected Head of Government
Miguel Ángel Mancera
PRD

Elections were held in the Federal District of Mexico (Mexico City) on July 1, 2012 to elect the district's Head of Government, all 66 deputies of the Legislative Assembly, and 16 borough mayors. The election coincided with the 2012 presidential and general elections.

Outgoing Head of Government Marcelo Ebrard, who was elected to the office in 2006, of the Party of the Democratic Revolution (PRD) was term-limited and was not allowed to seek re-election. District Attorney General Miguel Ángel Mancera, the candidate of the PRD-supported Movimiento Progresista coalition, was elected 7th Head of Government of the Federal District.

== Head of Government election ==
=== Background and campaign ===
Going into the 2012 election, the PRD had governed Mexico City since 1997. Under the PRD's leadership, the city adopted liberal social policies, including gay marriage, abortion, and no-fault divorce. Going into the 2012 election, term-limited Head of Government Marcelo Ebrard was considered politically popular.

=== PRD nomination ===
Polling in April 2011 conducted by El Universal found Alejandra Barrales, the head of the PRD group in the legislative assembly, to be the most popular potential PRD candidate for Head of Government. In the survey, Barrales took 24% of the vote, with Secretary of Social Development Martí Batres taking 13%.

In January 2012, Mexico City Attorney General Miguel Mancera was chosen as the candidate of the Movimiento Progresista coalition, which comprised the PRD, the Labor Party, and the Citizens' Movement.

=== Results ===
| Party/Coalition | Candidates | Votes | |
|---|---|---|---|
| Movimiento Progresista coalition (PRD, PT, Movimiento Ciudadano) | Miguel Ángel Mancera | 3,028,704 | 63.56% |
| Compromiso por México coalition (PRI, PVEM) | Beatriz Paredes Rangel | 941,139 | 19.75% |
| National Action Party | Isabel Miranda de Wallace | 648,856 | 13.62% |
| New Alliance Party | Rosario Guerra Díaz | 58,648 | 1.23% |

== Local elections ==
=== Legislative Assembly election ===
Yellow: Districts won by the PRD/PT/MC.Blue: Districts won by the PAN.

The Movimiento Progresista coalition won a majority in the Legislative Assembly.

| Partido | Diputados Mayoría relativa | Diputados Rep. Proporcional | Total |
|---|---|---|---|
| Movimiento Progresista coalition (PRD, PT, Movimiento Ciudadano) | 38 | 0 | 38 |
| National Action Party | 2 | 11 | 13 |
| Institutional Revolutionary Party | 0 | 9 | 9 |
| Ecologist Green Party of Mexico | 0 | 2 | 2 |
| New Alliance Party | 0 | 2 | 2 |
| Citizens' Movement | 0 | 2 | 2 |
| Total | 40 | 26 | 66 |

=== Borough mayor elections ===
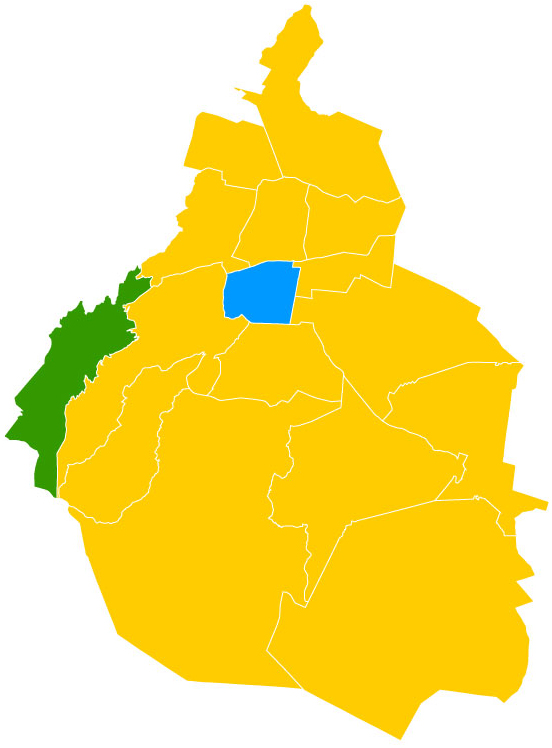
Results of the election for borough mayors. Blue: Victories by the PAN. Yellow: Victories by the PRD/PT/MC. Green: Victories by the PRI/PVEM.

Elections were held for all 16 borough mayor positions.

| Partido | Total |
|---|---|
| Movimiento Progresista coalition (PRD, PT, Movimiento Ciudadano) | 14 |
| National Action Party | 1 |
| Compromiso por México coalition (PRI, PVEM) | 1 |
