= 2006 Federal District (Mexico) election =

2006 election for Head of Government of the Federal District
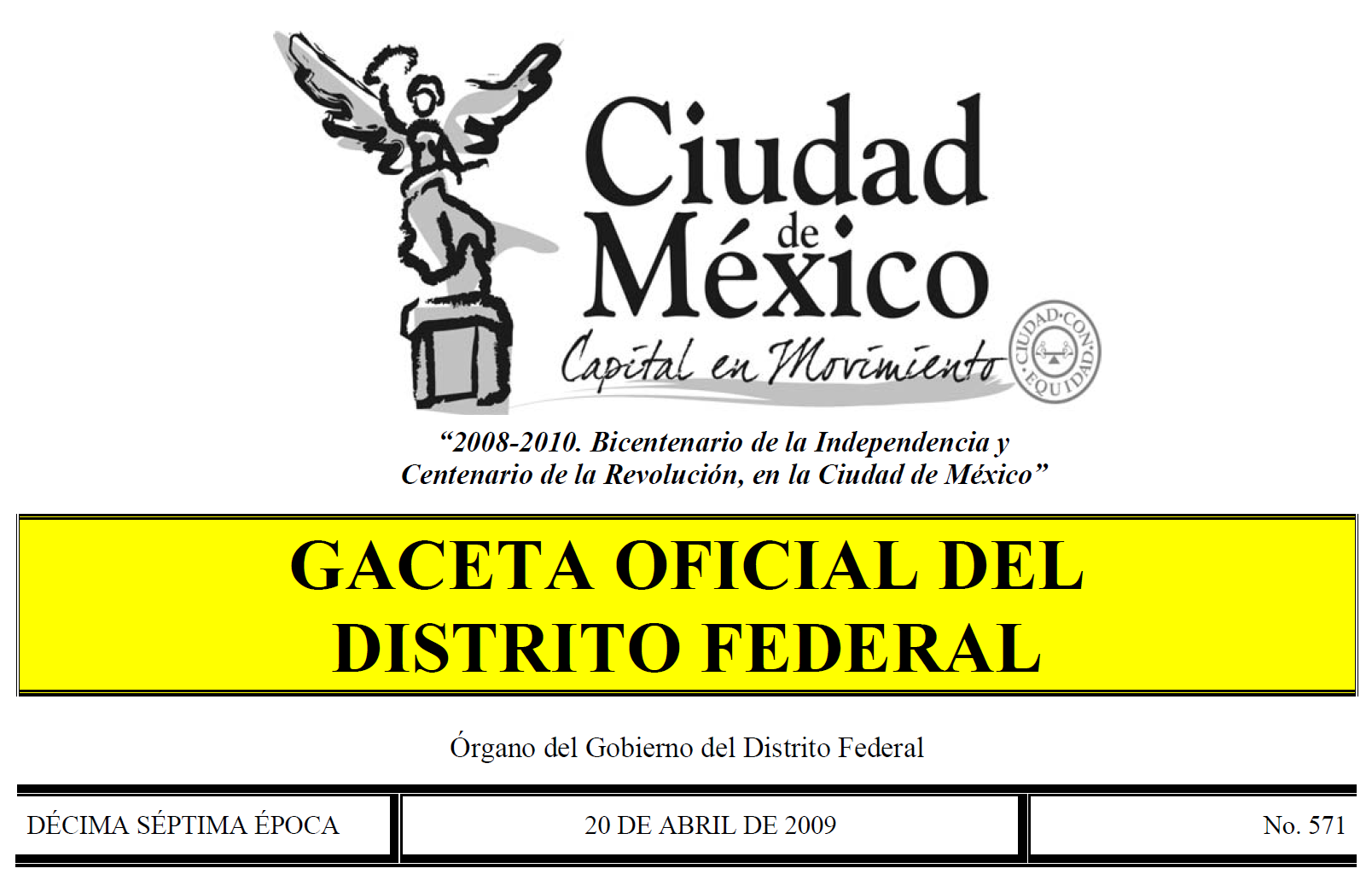
- 2 July 2006
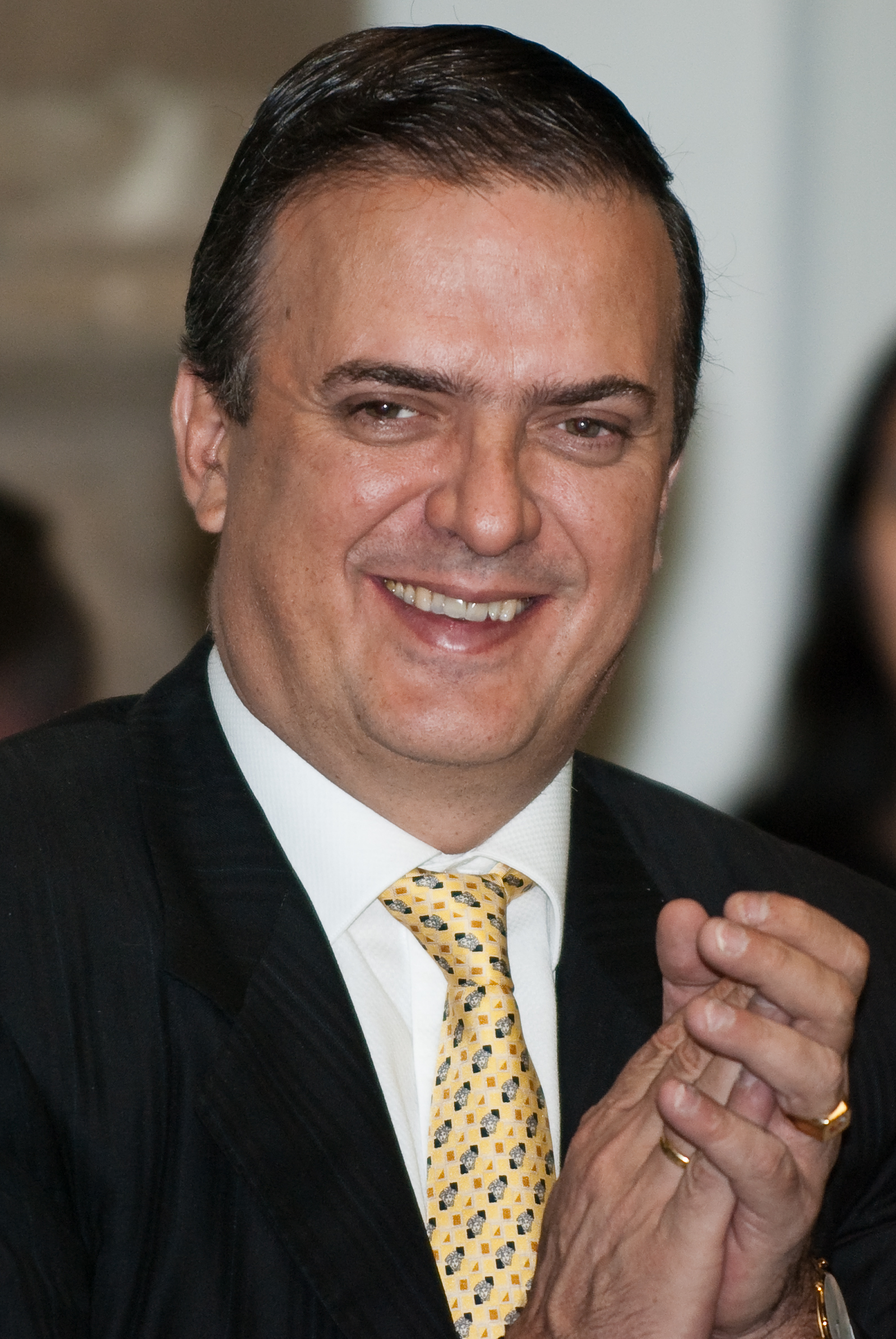

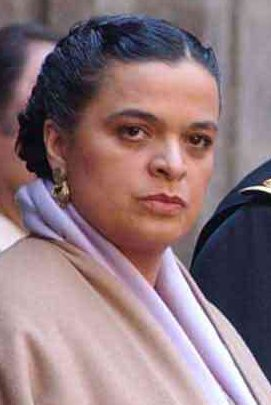
Nominee	Marcelo Ebrard	Demetrio Sodi	Beatriz Paredes
Party	PRD	PAN	PRI
Popular vote	2,215,147	1,302,097	1,031,334
Percentage	47.05%	27.66%	21.91%
- Yellow denotes local districts won by Ebrard (PRD). Blue denotes districts won by Sodi (PAN)
Head of Government before election
Alejandro Encinas Rodríguez
PRD
Elected Head of Government
Marcelo Ebrard
PRD

Elections were held in the Federal District of Mexico (Mexico City) were on Sunday, 2 July 2006 to elect the district's Head of Government, all 66 deputies of the Legislative Assembly, and 16 borough mayors.

Marcelo Ebrard, a member of the Party of the Democratic Revolution (PRD), won the election for Head of Government.

== Head of Government election ==
=== Background ===
In the 2000 Federal District election, PRD candidate Andrés Manuel López Obrador narrowly defeated PAN candidate Santiago Creel. López Obrador served as Head of Government until 2005, when he resigned to mount a candidacy for president in 2006. He was replaced by Alejandro Encinas Rodríguez following his resignation.

Polling in September 2005 found the PRD to have the support of 53% of voters going into the election, with 16% for the PRI and 14% for PAN.

=== Candidate selection ===
==== PRD ====
Polling in 2005 found Marcelo Ebrard, who served as the Federal District's secretary of social development under López Obrador, was found to be the most popular potential PRD candidate among party members and the general electorate. The polling found him to be favored for the nomination over former party president Pablo Gómez Álvarez (second place) and former federal deputy Jesús Ortega (third place).

Cuauhtémoc Cárdenas opposed the candidacy of Ebrard, a former member of the Democratic Center Party, accusing him of not distancing himself from neoliberalism or the Salinas administration's persecution of PRD members. Ebrard's candidacy was defended by Martí Batres, who argued that Ebrard deserved the full rights of other party members.

Ebrard was ultimately chosen as the PRD's candidate as part of the Alliance for the Good of All, which included the Labor Party and Convergence.

==== PAN ====
Polling in July 2005 by the firm Consulta Mitofsky found that First Lady of Mexico Marta Sahagún, the wife of president Vicente Fox, was the most popular potential PAN candidate. In August 2005, polling conducted by Reforma found Josefina Vázquez Mota, the Secretary of Social Development, to be the most popular PAN candidate. Polling company Parametría found that Senator Demetrio Sodi led the field of potential PAN candidates among party members and the general electorate.

Sodi faced Senator Jesús Galván Muñoz and federal deputy Fernando Pérez Noriega for the PAN nomination. Galván criticized Sodi, a former PRD member, for not formally joining PAN. Galván argued that if Sodi was chosen, PAN could end up falling to third place in the general election. He described Sodi's decision not to formally join PAN as "reprehensible".

Sodi argued that, if selected as the party's candidate, he would be able to attract former PRD voters who opposed Ebrard's nomination as the PRD's candidate. Sodi ultimately won PAN's nomination in an internal election in which 2,918 PAN members voted, with 45% abstentionism. Despite being a PAN candidate, Sodi distanced himself from right-wing politics, stating that in PAN, "almost no one likes being told that they are right-wing".

==== PRI ====
Polling conducted in 2005 found that Beatriz Paredes, the former Governor of Tlaxcala and President of the Chamber of Deputies, was the most popular potential PRI candidate among both party members and the general electorate. Hypothetical polling by Consulta Mitofsky in July 2005 found that Paredes was favored over former PRI president María de los Ángeles Moreno by a 54.4% to 8.6% margin among all voters, and an 81.2% to 11.3% margin among PRI members.

=== Polling ===
Date	Publisher	Ebrard (PRD)	Paredes (PRI)	Sodi (PAN)
November 13, 2005	El Universal	45%	16%	15%
November 3, 2005	GEA-ISA	61%	25%	14%
January 18, 2006	Parametría	66%	14%	18%
January 22, 2006	Reforma	60%	18%	20%
January 22, 2006	GEA-ISA	58%	16%	26%
January 29, 2006	El Universal	47%	16%	13%
February 19, 2006	GEA-ISA	65%	17%	16%
March 19, 2006	Reforma	57%	18%	23%
March 19, 2006	GEA-ISA	42%	33%	23%
March 29, 2006	Parametría	55%	22%	21%
April 9, 2006	Reforma	52%	23%	23%
April 30, 2006	GEA-ISA	46%	28%	24%
May 28, 2006	Reforma	51%	23%	25%
May 28, 2006	GEA-ISA	48%	27%	23%
June 21, 2006	Reforma	47%	22%	28%
June 21, 2006	El Universal	53%	22%	23%

=== Results ===
The Federal District Electoral Institute (IEDF) formally announced Ebrard's victory on 5 July 2006 and presented him with his certificate of majority.

Party/Alliance	Pictures	Candidate	Votes	%
Alliance for the Good of All (PRD, PT, Convergence)		Marcelo Ebrard	2,215,147	47.05
National Action Party		Demetrio Sodi	1,302,097	27.66
Alliance for Mexico (PRI, PVEM)		Beatriz Paredes	1,031,334	21.91
New Alliance Party		Alberto Cinta	109,133	2.32
Social Democratic and Farmer Alternative		Gustavo Jiménez Pons	50,482	1.07

== Borough mayors ==
In the sixteen borough mayoral races, the PRD-led alliance was victorious in fourteen (the thirteen it already held, plus Milpa Alta gained from the PRI), with the PAN retaining the two (Benito Juárez, D.F. and Miguel Hidalgo, D.F.) that it had won in the 2003 election.

== Legislative Assembly ==
The PRD-led alliance won in 36 of the 40 single-member local constituencies for the Legislative Assembly, with the PAN winning the other four. The additional 26 deputies assigned on the basis of proportional representation in accordance with the parties' total vote numbers were distributed as follows: PAN, 12; PRI, 4; PVEM, 4; Nueva Alianza, 4; and Alternativa, 2.
