= Jesús Galván Muñoz =

Mexican lawyer and politician

Senator for the Federal District
- In office 1 September 2000 – 31 August 2006
- Preceded by: Fernando Solana
- Succeeded by: Pablo Gómez Álvarez

Personal details
- Born: 17 April 1955 (age 71) Lagos de Moreno, Jalisco, Mexico
- Party: PAN
- Education: National Autonomous University of Mexico
- Occupation: Lawyer and politician

Jesús Galván Muñoz (born 17 April 1955) is a Mexican lawyer and politician affiliated with the National Action Party. As of 2014 he served as Senator of the LVIII and LIX Legislatures of the Mexican Congress representing the Federal District. He was a pre-candidate for the PAN nomination for Head of the Federal District (Mexico City) in the 2006 election, losing to Demetrio Sodi.
