= Progressive Movement (Mexico) =

Progressive Movement Movimiento Progresista
- Leader: Andrés Manuel López Obrador
- Founded: 2011
- Dissolved: 2012
- Preceded by: Coalition for the Good of All
- Ideology: Cardenism; Social democracy Left-wing nationalism Progressivism
- Political position: Left-wing

The Progressive Movement (Spanish: Movimiento Progresista) was a political alliance formed between the Democratic Revolution (PRD), Labor Party (PT) and the Citizens' Movement (MC), which contested the 2012 Mexican general election. Its presidential candidate Andrés Manuel López Obrador came in second place, losing to Enrique Peña Nieto.

== History ==
The alliance was built around the candidacy of the then PRD and former head of Government of the Federal District Andrés Manuel López Obrador, to compete in the federal elections in Mexico in 2012. This union was also used for candidates for the Senate and the Chamber of Deputies in different states, as well as for gubernatorial candidates in the same elections of the same year.

As a left-wing alliance, it proposed, in the words of its candidate López Obrador, "an alternative nation project that seeks to change the neoliberal policy that has developed in Mexico since the mid -1980s."

In July 2013, Marcelo Ebrard took up the name again to create an expression of the Party of the Democratic Revolution (PRD), the Progressive Movement, which in January 2014 became a civil association with the name of Movimiento Progresista AC.

== Dissolution ==
After the loss, López Obrador told a rally in Mexico City's main plaza Zocalo on 9 September 2012 that he would withdraw from the Democratic Revolution Party "on the best of terms," as well as the Labor Party and Citizens' Movement (MC). He added that he was working on founding a new party from the Movement for National Regeneration, which he would later name National Regeneration Movement or MORENA.

== Results ==
Candidate	Results by party			Coalition results		Place
Candidate	Party	Votes	Percentage	Votes	Percentage	Place
Andrés Manuel López Obrador	Party of the Democratic Revolution	11,122,251	22.18%	15,848,827	31.61%	2nd
Andrés Manuel López Obrador	Labor Party	2,597,905	5.18%	15,848,827	31.61%	2nd
Andrés Manuel López Obrador	Citizens' Movement	2,128,671	4.25%	15,848,827	31.61%	2nd
National Electoral Institute
