= Broad Progressive Front =

The Broad Progressive Front (Spanish: Frente Amplio Progresista, FAP) was a legislative, electoral and governmental coalition of centre-left and leftist political parties in Mexico. The FAP was founded after the 2006 Mexican general election following the final agreements that the extinct Coalition for the Good of All took. The FAP was composed of the Party of the Democratic Revolution (PRD) the Labor Party (PT) and the Citizens' Movement (MC).
