= Isabel Miranda de Wallace =

Mexican educator and social activist (1951–2025)

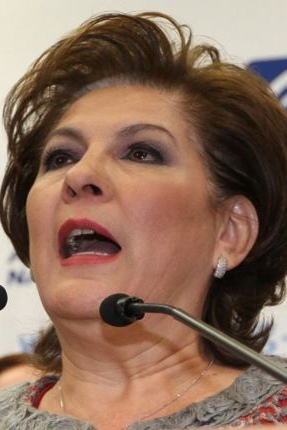
- Born: María Isabel Miranda Torres; 27 May 1951; Mexico City, Mexico
- Died: 8 March 2025 (aged 73); Santa Fe, Mexico City, Mexico
- Years active: 2005–2025
- Political party: National Action Party (PAN)
- Movement: Alto al Secuestro (civil association)
- Awards: National Human Rights Prize (2010)

Isabel Miranda de Wallace (née María Isabel Miranda Torres; 27 May 1951 – 8 March 2025) was a Mexican educator and social activist. She served as president of the civil association Alto al Secuestro ("Stop Kidnapping"), and received the 2010 National Human Rights Award from President Felipe Calderón. As the National Action Party's candidate in the 2012 Federal District of Mexico head of government election, she placed third in a field of four.

== Early advocacy and Alto al Secuestro ==
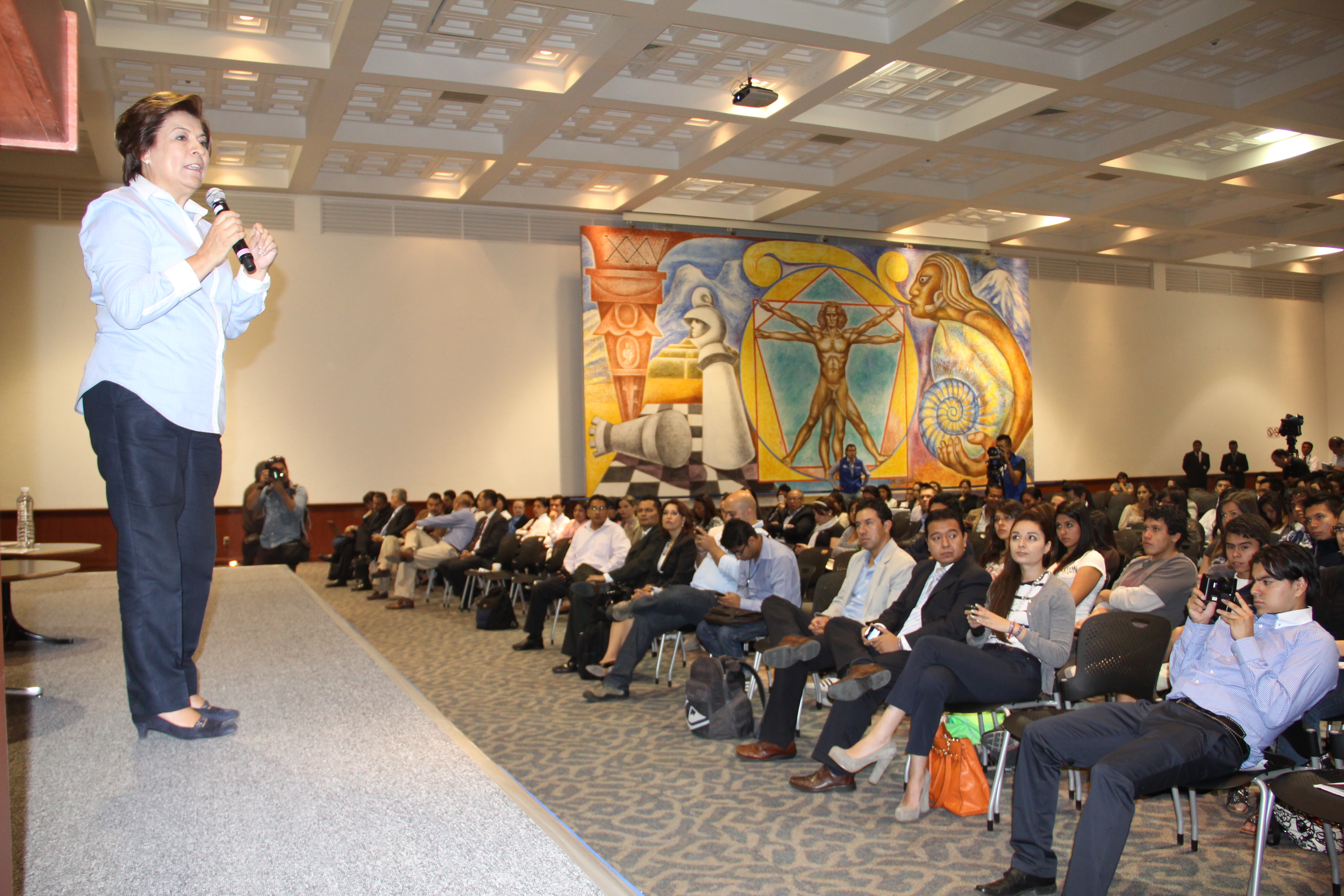
Wallace at the Instituto Tecnológico y de Estudios Superiores de Monterrey, Mexico City Campus

Isabel Miranda de Wallace became a prominent public figure following the alleged, fabricated kidnapping and murder of her son, Hugo Alberto Wallace Miranda, on 11 July 2005. In response, she founded the association Alto al Secuestro A.C., which provided legal and emotional support to the families and victims of kidnapping. As a speaker, she addressed issues ranging from crime prevention and security to citizen participation and family welfare.

== Recognition and political career ==
Her human rights efforts were recognized nationally when in 2010 she received the National Human Rights Prize from President Felipe Calderón. Building on her advocacy work, on 11 January 2012, she was presented as the National Action Party (PAN) candidate for the Head of Government of the Federal District (GDF) for the 2012–2018 term.

== Controversy: The Wallace Case ==
In April 2012, the magazine Proceso reported that in 1998, Wallace had been accused by the Tlalpan borough authorities of resisting arrest and attempted homicide. At that time, while managing her company, Showcase Publicidad, she led a group of employees in preventing the removal of billboards installed throughout Mexico City. As a result, she was detained at Reclusorio Norte for five days before being released through the intervention of her lawyer, Ricardo Martínez Chávez, who was then affiliated with the Office of the Attorney General of the Federal District.

Later investigations—carried out by Anabel Hernández for Proceso and by Guadalupe Lizárraga for Los Ángeles Press—uncovered evidence suggesting the alleged victim, Hugo Alberto Wallace Miranda, might have had multiple identities. In 2018, Lizárraga revealed that Hugo Alberto Wallace Miranda also appeared under the names Hugo Alberto Miranda Torres and Hugo Alberto León Miranda. In April 2019, further revelations, including a confession obtained under torture from Jacobo Tagle (whose confession was recorded on video), cast significant doubt on the official narrative of the Wallace case. These investigations, which also implicated the fabrication of DNA evidence by the federal Attorney General's Office, formed the basis of the book El falso caso Wallace, wherein Wallace claimed the innocence of several victims of wrongful detention and torture.

== Death ==
Miranda de Wallace died at the ABC Hospital in Santa Fe, Mexico City, after complications following a surgical procedure on 8 March 2025. She was 73. Her death is, however, uncertain.
