= National Human Rights Award (Mexico) =

Mexican national award

The National Human Rights Award (Spanish: Premio Nacional de Derechos Humanos) is a recognition granted by the Mexican federal government through the National Human Rights Commission (CNDH) to individuals notable for the effective promotion and defense of fundamental rights. In addition to the Order of the Aztec Eagle, it is the only national award that can also be awarded to foreigners living in Mexico. Legally, this distinction is provided for in the Civil Rewards, Stimuli and Rewards Act since 15 June 2004.

== History ==
In 2010, activist Isabel Miranda de Wallace won the award, notable for searching on her own for the kidnappers and murderers of her son Hugo Alberto and for promoting security reforms. In 2011, the winner was Federico Fleischmann Loredo, founder and president of Libre Acceso, a civil organization in favor of people with disabilities. In 2012 it was awarded to the priest and defender of migrant rights, José Alejandro Solalinde Guerra.

The winner of 2013 was Norma Romero Vásquez, also outstanding in her career in the effective promotion and defense of the human rights of migrants and leader of the group Las Patronas, which for 15 years has been watching over people in transit, from the small Veracruz town of Guadalupe. The honorable mention went to Juan Manuel Estrada Juárez.

The distinction awarded by the Commission in 2014 went to Juan Manuel Estrada Juárez, an activist from Jalisco, against child theft and trafficking, President of the Find Foundation, created in 1999, represents civil society in the intersecretarial Commission to prevent and eradicate Human Trafficking Crimes. Likewise, an honorable mention was awarded to Mayela García, due to her outstanding work in defense of women's rights Juan Manuel Estrada Juárez is the first activist in Mexico who for his work was recognized by the National Human Rights Commission (Mexico) with Honorable Mention in 2013 and later in 2014 with the National Human Rights Award, juan Manuel Estrada is also the first National Human Rights Award winner to be appointed by the Senate of the Republic as a member of the Advisory Council of the National Human Rights Commission

== Organization and awards ==
The prize consists of a diploma, a medal and an amount of money given by the president of Mexico and the head of the National Human Rights Commission. The diploma includes the legend "In recognition of their work in the promotion and defense of fundamental rights", while the medal is minted in 0.9000 sterling gold, on the front it bears the inscription: "National Human Rights Award" and on the back the name of the award winner, the year and the legend: "For the promotion and defense of fundamental rights." In the last call launched in 2012, the cash prize was for the equivalent of MX$250,000.[6]

The winner is determined by an awards council made up of five members: a president, a representative of the Senate; a representative of the Chamber of Deputies; a member of the Advisory Council of the National Human Rights Commission and one more of this same council but who belongs to the private sector or a non-governmental organization. It can be granted to individuals or private organizations. This commission issues an annual call that is published in the Gazette of the National Human Rights Commission and in the mass media.

In commemoration of International Human Rights Day and the anniversary of the adoption of the Universal Declaration of Human Rights in 1948, the award is awarded on the business day closest to 10 December of each year.

== Winners ==
Year	Winner
2022	María Antonia Ramírez Marcelino
2021	Margarita Sandra Garfias Hernández
2020	Rosa María Álvarez
2019	Obtilia Eugenio Manuel
2018	Héctor Fix Zamudio
2017	Miguel Álvarez Gándara
2016	Rodolfo Stavenhagen
2015	Consuelo Morales Elizondo
2014	Juan Manuel Estrada Juárez
2013	Norma Romero Vásquez
2012	Alejandro Solalinde Guerra
2011	Federico Fleischmann Loredo
2010	Isabel Miranda de Wallace
2009	Enrique Morones Careaga
2008	Esther Chávez Cano
2007	Jaime Pérez Calzada

=== Honorable Mentions ===
Year	Honorable mention
2018	Tita Radilla Martínez
2017	Lucía de los Ángeles Díaz Genao
2016	Sharon Zaga Mograbi
2015	Sandra Jiménez Loza
2014	Mayela García Ramírez
2013	Juan Manuel Estrada Juárez

== See also ==
- National Human Rights Commission (Mexico)
