= Alberto Cinta =

Mexican politician

Alberto Emiliano Cinta Martínez (born in Mexico City) is a Mexican economist, entrepreneur and politician who is a founder and became the first general secretary of the New Alliance Party (PANAL). He ran as the PANAL's candidate for Mayor of Mexico City Head of Government of the Federal District in the 2006 Federal District election. He has been a Congressman, public servant, university professor and entrepreneur. He studied economics at the ITAM in Mexico City, and holds two master's degrees from both the Ecole Nationale d'Administratuon (ENA, Paris) and Harvard (KSG, Massachusetts). He has been a deputy at the Chamber of Deputies for the Green Party and president of the Special Commission of Competitiveness (2009-2012) and also a deputy for Mexico City (2012-2015). Since 2001 he is the founder and chairman of a leading Mexican hospitality group that operates more than fifty high-end restaurants, nightclubs, business clubs, and concert halls. In 2014 his group started operations in the US with the opening of its first restaurant (Cantina La Veinte), in Miami.

== Personal life and education ==
Cinta is the son of lawyer Alberto Cinta Guzmán. He holds a bachelor's degree in economics from the Instituto Tecnológico Autónomo de México (ITAM) where he studied from 1989 to 1993. From 1994 to 1995 he pursued graduate studies at the École Nationale d'Administration (ENA) where he received a master's degree in public administration and political economy. He also holds a master's degree in public administration from Harvard University. He has participated in academic publications such as "Towards Mexico's Democratization" (Routledge 1999) and "México Visión Global, la agenda para el siglo XXI" (Porrúa, 2006), among others.

He is the founder and chairman of the Board of Directors of Cinbersol S.A., the leading company for high end hospitality in Mexico that operates several restaurants, concert halls and clubs in Mexico and the US such as "Club Piso 51", Landó Grill, Restaurante Lamm, "50 Friends", "Sud 777", Ivoire and "Cantina La Veinte" among others.

== Professional career ==
In 1991 Cinta joined the public service working for the President of the Republic's office as Director of public opinion analysis under President Carlos Salinas de Gortari. He also joined the office of the President Ernesto Zedillo of the PRI, as General Director of Research and Analysis (1995–1997). From 1999 to 2000 he served as advisor for Francisco Labastida's presidential campaign (PRI). From 2003 to 2005 he served as General Director of the Centro de Estudios Sociales y de Opinión Pública of the Chamber of Deputies.
