= La 72 =

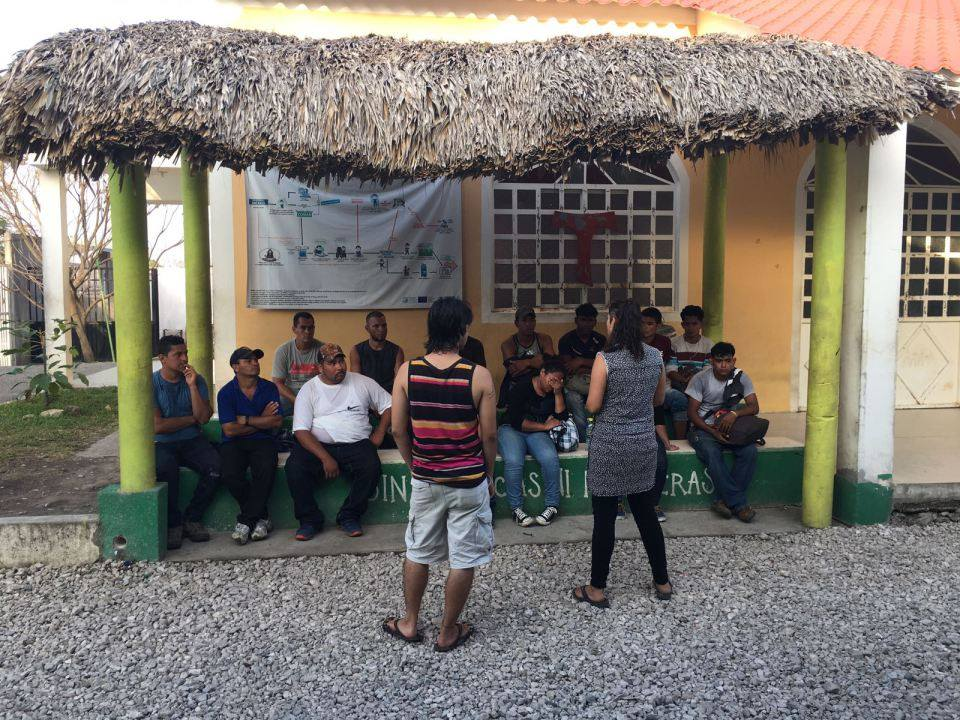
Hostel "La 72", located in Tenosique, Tabasco.

La 72 Hogar-Refugio Para Personas Migrantes is a migrant shelter and human rights organization managed by the Franciscan Province "San Felipe de Jesús" in the town of Tenosique, Tabasco, on Mexico's southern border. Commonly referred to as La 72, the organization provides basic humanitarian aid, psychological support, and legal assistance and representation to thousands of migrants and refugees from Central America each year.

The house is named after the 72 victims of the San Fernando Massacre in 2010 in the northern Mexican state of Tamaulipas.

== Services ==
La 72 provides basic humanitarian assistance in the form of: clothing, food, first-aid, and shelter. They also partner with Doctors Without Borders to provide medical and psychological attention within the shelter. They also provide special services to vulnerable groups, including separate dormitories and targeted social support for women, LGBT+ identifying individuals, and unaccompanied minors. La 72 offers legal orientation and representation to all guests; in 2018, they represented more than 1,400 asylum seekers.

La 72 has exponentially grown since its opening in 2010. Since opening, they have assisted over 50,000 migrants and refugees.

== See also ==
- Las Patronas
