= Las Patronas =

Mexican women's volunteer group

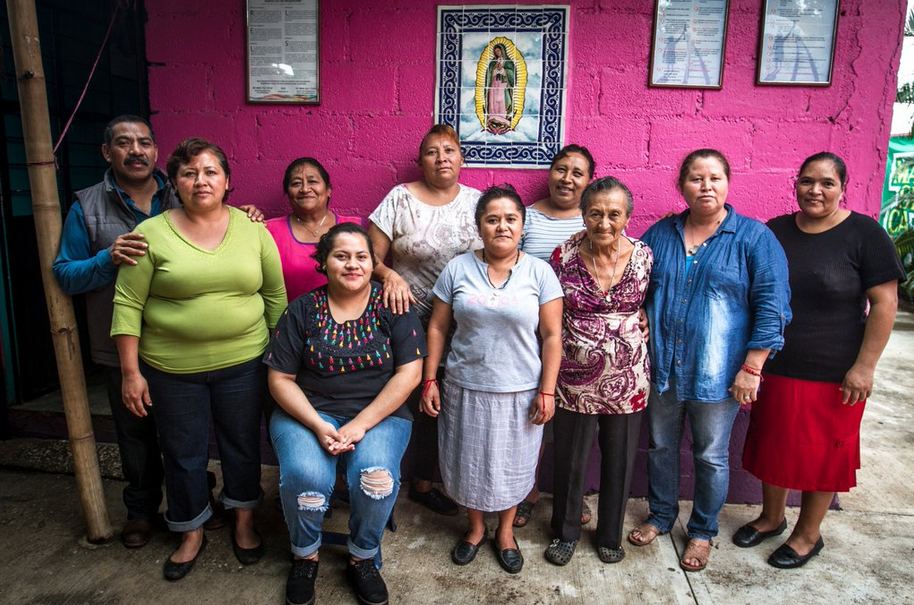
Members of the group. Back: Pepe, Lupe, Rosa, Bernarda. Front: Toña, Karina, Julía, Doña Leo, Norma, María

Las Patronas (English: The Patronesses) is a group of volunteer women of La Patrona community, from the town of Guadalupe in the municipality of Amatlán de los Reyes, Veracruz. Since 1995 the group has provided food and assistance to migrants on their way north through Veracruz. Their work towards the defense of the migrant rights has earned them several awards, such as the National Human Rights Award in 2013. The group was nominated for the Princess of Asturias Award in 2015, after a campaign from Change.org that collected more than 50,000 signatures in support.

== History ==
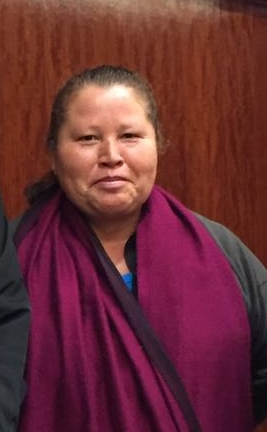
Coordinator Norma Romero in Santiago de Compostela, España

The group began in La Patrona, Veracruz, on February 14, 1995. On that day, group founders say they purchased food from a store, and saw a train known as La Bestia ("The Beast") which was carrying migrants, who asked for food. The women gave the migrants food, and returned home, where they spoke about the experience. They then decided to continue the work.

== Support work migrants ==
The group prepares between fifteen and twenty kilograms of rice and beans per day. They deliver about 300 lunches daily. When passing the Beast, they have approximately 15 minutes to throw the bags with food, as well as bottles of water, for migrants to catch them on the train.

== Members ==
Norma, Bernarda, Rosa, Nila, Tere, Toña, Karla, Karina, Doña Tere, Julia, Pepe, Virginia, Uriel and Anahí comprise Las Patronas.

== Awards ==
Awards
Year	Award	Giver
2013	National Human Rights Award	National Human Rights Commission
2013	National Award for Voluntary Action and Solidarity	Federal government of Mexico
2013	Premio Nacional de Derechos Humanos “Don Sergio Méndez Arceo”	Don Sergio Mendez Arceo Foundation

== Solidarity with other organizations ==
=== Campaign support ===
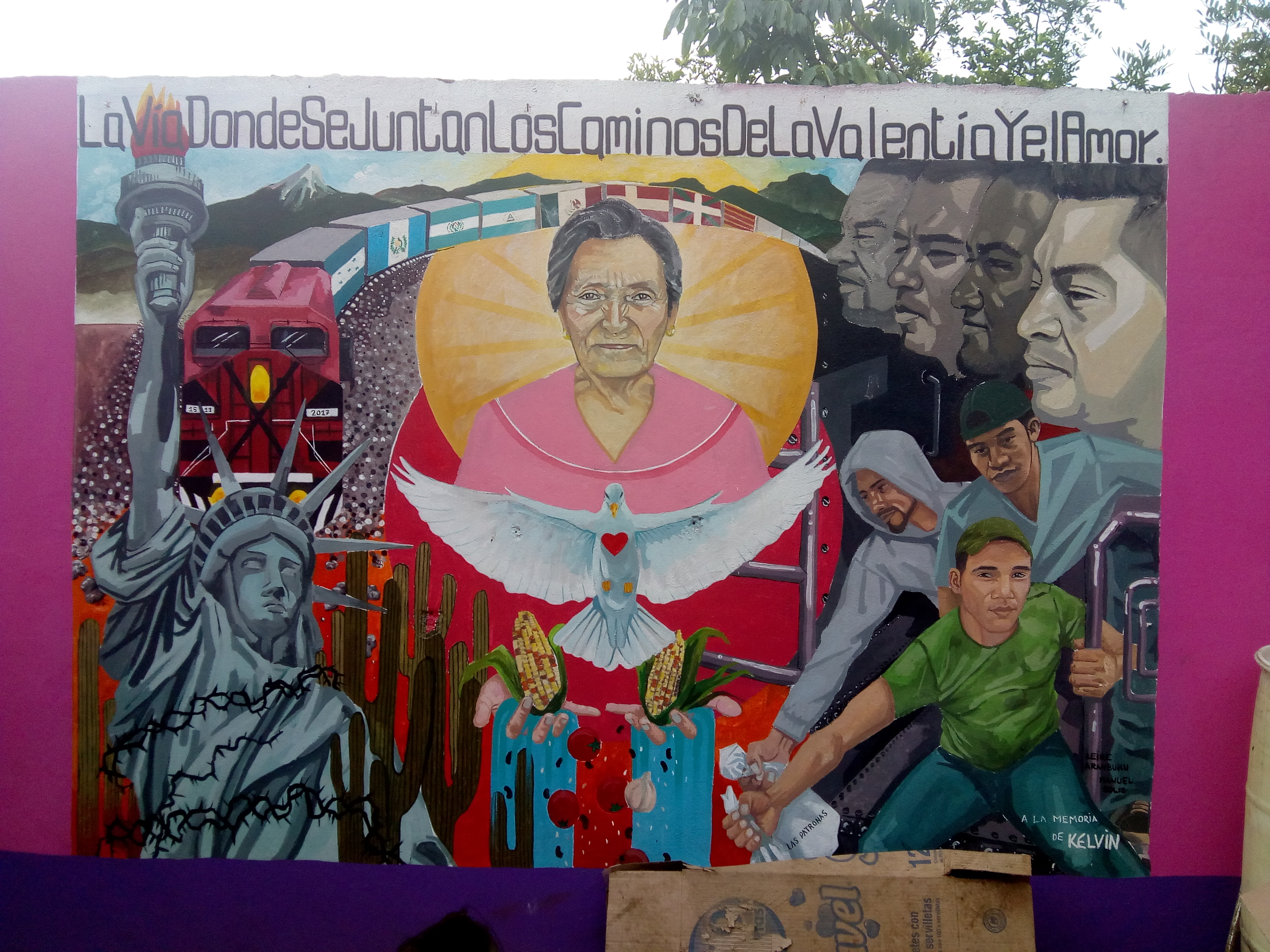
Mural celebrating the work of the group, on the patio of the Comedor de Las Patronas

On November 26, 2011 in Xalapa, Veracruz a day of artistic and cultural solidarity called Va por Las Patronas (English: Go by The Bosses) was organized. During this action the population donated non-perishable food and clothing in good condition. The group that organized the event was supported by figures such as Elena Poniatowska, Damian Alcazar and Jesusa Rodriguez. During the day six tons of food were collected. On June 2, 2012 a second day also in Xalapa, Veracruz organized this year by the jazz community where he brought together a load of approximately half ton of food and clothing donations from organized.

In September 2012 a campaign of support in Puebla also began with a series of photographic exhibitions, roundtable discussions and screenings of documentaries where besides food, medicines and money were collected, in order to ensure the work of the patrons by at least one year.

=== The Bosses and other groups ===
On March 8, 2016 participated in Santiago de Compostela, Spain in the lecture series "No one is illegal" organized by the Party Sain.

== Criticism ==
In the beginning, they faced negative criticism in their own community, prompting the departure of some people who supported the group in their daily work: "We were 20 at first, but misinformation, fear that maybe we did something wrong, made some will leave" Bernarda.

Religious social activists linked to migrant advocacy movement have denounced hostilities against La Patrona by the local ecclesiastical institution:

"they have disavowed them, and that I heard personally, because they have not unionized with the hierarchy of Córdoba, they do not work for the bishopric of Córdoba, and although they are Catholic faithful, They are not a docile parishioner, and that is why they are unknown to them, despite the fact that they are a prophetic and service symbol, that hurts the hierarchy of Córdoba"

— Alejandro Solalinde

"it must be said publicly: our Patroness sisters are being harassed by our Church, that Church to which we belong, and like them, there are countless more defenders of migrants victims of harassment."

— Fray Tomás González

== Documentary records ==
Documentaries
Title	Year	Country	Director	Duration
De Nadie	2005	Mexico	Tin Dirdamal	82 min.
La Patrona (short)	2009	Mexico	Lizette Argüello	5 min.
El tren de las moscas (short)	2010	Spain	Nieves Prieto and Fernando Lopez Castillo Tassie	14 min.
Llévate mis amores	2014	Mexico	Arturo González Villaseñor	90 min.
Como el viento	2015	Mexico	Santiago Dávial y Julián Álvarez	7 min.
