= Demetrio Sodi =

Mexican politician

Head of Miguel Hidalgo
- In office 1 December 2009 – 30 November 2012
- Preceded by: Alfredo Vinalay Mora
- Succeeded by: Víctor Hugo Romo de Vivar Guerra

Senator of the Congress of the Union for the Federal District
- In office 1 September 2000 – 31 August 2006
- Preceded by: Jorge Galván Moreno
- Succeeded by: Federico Döring Casar

Deputy of the Congress of the Union for the Federal District's 26th district
- In office 1 September 1997 – 31 August 2000
- Preceded by: Marco Antonio Michel Díaz
- Succeeded by: José Tomás Lozano Pardinas

Representative in the Assembly of Representatives of the Federal District for the 25th district
- In office 15 November 1991 – 14 November 1994
- Preceded by: Manuel Jiménez Guzmán
- Succeeded by: Alberto Nava Salgado

Deputy of the Congress of the Union for the Federal District's 25th district
- In office 1 September 1988 – 31 October 1991
- Preceded by: Santiago Oñate Laborde
- Succeeded by: Alberto Nava Salgado

Personal details
- Born: Demetrio Javier Sodi de la Tijera; 25 September 1944 (age 82) Mexico City, Mexico
- Party: National Action Party (2005–2017)
- Other political affiliations: Party of the Democratic Revolution (1993–2005); Institutional Revolutionary Party (until 1993)
- Children: 4
- Relatives: Sodi family
- Education: Iberoamerican University; Harvard University

Demetrio Javier Sodi de la Tijera (Spanish pronunciation: [deˈmetɾjo xaˈβjeɾ ˈsoði ðe la tiˈxeɾa]; born September 25, 1944) is a Mexican journalist, businessman and politician who has served in the upper and lower houses of the Congress of the Union, and as head of Miguel Hidalgo borough from 2009 to 2012. In 2006, he unsuccessfully ran as the National Action Party (PAN) candidate for the Head of Government of the Federal District. A member of the Sodi family, he is the cousin of the actress and singer Thalía.

== Early life and education ==
Sodi was born on September 25, 1944, in Mexico City, Mexico. He is the son of Demetrio Sodi Pallares, a cardiologist, professor and prominent researcher in the field of electrocardiography, and Soledad de la Tijera Alarcón.

Sodi studied business administration at the Universidad Iberoamericana and pursued graduate studies at Harvard University.

== Political career ==
Sodi began his business activities in Grupo Cifra where he worked from 1962 to 1975. In 1977, he entered the public service. At the national level, he coordinated social support programs at Conasupo and was the managing director of Diconsa stores, where he increased the number of stores between 1978 and 1982 from 3,200 to 16,000. He was General Coordinator of Supplies and Food Distribution at the Federal District Department from 1982 to 1987.

In the private sector, his professional career was developed at the Aurrerá supermarket chain (since bought out by Wal-Mart).

Sodi has been a member of three main political parties. On September 1, 1988, he was elected to the Chamber of Deputies, where he served as an Institutional Revolutionary Party (PRI) deputy, representing the Federal District's 25th district, from 1988 to 1991 during the 54th session of Congress. On November 15, 1991, he took up the position of Representative for the Assembly of Representatives of the Federal District. In 1993, he conceived, planned and organized members from all political parties and citizen organizations to demand for the first plebiscite to achieve more democracy in Mexico City, by pressuring the federal government to establish popular and democratic elections for the Head of Government. He would serve on this position until November 14, 1994.

That same year in April, he resigned from the PRI, and would go on to join the Party of the Democratic Revolution (PRD) three years later. On September 1, 1997, he was elected to serve once again to the Chamber of Deputies, representing the Federal District's 26th district; then, in 2000 he was elected to the Senate and served during the 58th and the 59th sessions of Congress.

In 2005 he resigned from the PRD and was nominated by the National Action Party as its candidate for head of government in the 2006 Federal District local elections, being defeated by Marcelo Ebrard.

During his electoral campaign for Head of Government, Sodi wrote a book entitled "The Inclusive City" where he analyzes, diagnoses and offers government proposals for the Federal District. The book was co-authored by renowned urban researchers such as: Emilio Pradilla Cobos, Lisett Márquez López, Elias Fonseca Chicho and Alejandro Castro.

In 2009, Sodi won the elections for head of Miguel Hidalgo borough in Mexico City, over his opponents Ana Guevara (PRD), and Martín Olavarrieta (PRI) with 39.33% of the vote.

He later became a columnist for the newspaper El Universal and host of the Contrapunto program by Televisa. He chairs the organization Metrópoli 2025, a civil association that currently brings together more than 200 scholars, researchers, businesspeople and politicians worried about the future of the Valley of Mexico.
