= Ciudadanos en Apoyo a los Derechos Humanos =

Mexican non-governmental organization

Ciudadanos en Apoyo a los Derechos Humanos, A.C. (CADHAC), also known in English as Citizens in Support of Human Rights, is a Mexican non-governmental organization founded in 1993 based in Monterrey, Nuevo León by Consuelo Morales Elizondo. Its main objective is the promotion and defense of human rights in the state of Nuevo León and northern Mexico.

== Activities ==
CADHAC carries out various activities to promote and defend human rights in northern Mexico. Its activities include providing legal advice and representation to victims of human rights violations, promoting human rights education, documenting cases of human rights violations, conducting research on human rights-related issues, and participating in networks and coalitions for the defense of human rights. CADHAC has also worked to denounce violence and impunity in the region, particularly in relation to cases of forced disappearances and extrajudicial executions.

Between 2009 and 2014, CADHAC and the group AMORES collaborated on roughly 1249 cases of missing persons, with around 26% of the cases involving state agents and 74% attributed to organized crime. Additionally, they worked to advocate for specific policies such as the declaration of missing persons due to forced disappearance. A total of 104 individuals were located, with 59 found alive and 45 through genetic testing. Moreover, an early search mechanism for missing persons was established by CADHAC in 2015, and they were successful in achieving the approval of the Law for the Declaration of Missing Persons due to Forced Disappearance in Nuevo León State in April of that same year.

== Recognitions ==
- In 2015, the NGO received the Franco-German Human Rights Award "Gilberto Bosques" for their work.
- In 2012, CADHAC received the XX National Award of Human Rights “Don Sergio Méndez Arceo”.
