= Consuelo Morales Elizondo =

Mexican human rights activist (born 1948)

Consuelo Gloria Morales Elizondo (born March 1948) is a Mexican human rights activist, founder and director of the organization Ciudadanos en Apoyo a los Derechos Humanos, A.C. (CADHAC), known in English as Citizens in Support of Human Rights.

== Life and career ==
Morales Elizondo was born in Monterrey, Nuevo León, in 1948. She has a bachelor's degree in social work from the Escuela de Trabajo Social Vasco de Quiroga and a master's degree in human rights and democracy from the Latin American Social Sciences Institute, and is a sister of the Congregation de Notre Dame of the Augustinian Canons.

Her first human rights work was with indigenous people in Veracruz and with street children in Mexico City. After returning to Monterrey in 1992, in April 1993, with other nuns, she founded Ciudadanos en Apoyo a los Derechos Humanos, A.C. (CADHAC), which she leads. She works for the rights of people caught up in Mexico's war on drugs, including the desaparacidos (disappeared people) in the state of Nuevo León, and also to build respect between the sexes. She has been a member of several groups and commissions on human rights, including the board of OXFAM Mexico.

== Honors ==
Morales Elizondo has received awards including: the national award for equality and against discrimination of the National Council to Prevent Discrimination (CONAPRED) in 2010, the Alison Des Forges Award for Extraordinary Activism of Human Rights Watch, in 2011, the 2013 Medal of Civic Merit from the state of Nuevo León in 2014, the second Gilberto Bosques Human Rights Award by the Embassies of France and Germany in Mexico, in 2015, and the 2015 National Human Rights Award of the National Human Rights Commission (CNDH).
