= Esther Chávez =

Mexican campaigner against femicide

Esther Chávez Cano
- Born: 2 June 1933; Chihuahua, Mexico
- Died: 25 December 2009 (aged 76); Ciudad Juárez, Mexico
- Occupations: Accountant and activist
- Known for: Campaigning against femicide in Ciudad Juárez
- Notable work: Casa Amiga Centro de Crisis

Esther Chávez Cano (Note: In this Mexican name, the surname is Chávez and the second or maternal family name is Cano.) (2 June 1933 – 25 December 2009) was an accountant, public speaker, human rights activist and feminist, who campaigned against femicides in Ciudad Juárez, Mexico.

Her campaign focused on the scale of femicide in Ciudad Juárez, a city of 1.5 million close to the border with the United States that has one of the world's highest violent crime rates. In the ten years to 2003, 365 women and girls had been recorded as having disappeared in Juárez, with over 100 found raped, tortured and murdered. Their bodies were often found dumped in the desert scrub or wasteland that surrounds Juárez. Chávez's role was to record the details of every woman murdered or who had disappeared in her notepad, she filed newspaper cuttings, identified patterns of behaviour and drew attention to crimes that many in authority preferred to ignore.

"The pain of beaten-up women and raped girls must fuel our outrage; we must all shout 'not one more woman murdered, raped, or insulted'." This was part of the speech Esther Chávez gave in December 2008, when she was awarded Mexico's National Human Rights Prize (Premio Nacional de Derechos Humanos), after 16 years of activism. The prize was awarded by President Felipe Calderón, but that honour did not stop Chávez later denouncing Calderón, when in 2009 he appointed Arturo Chávez as attorney general, who she felt had mishandled investigations into femicides.

== Early years ==
Her recording skills dated from her career as an accountant, from which she had just begun retirement in 1992 when she took up her campaigning work. Esther Chávez Cano was born in 1933 in the city of Chihuahua. Her father died when she was four, her mother suffered from depression and so from a young age she helped care for her two brothers and five sisters. In 1951, she moved to Guadalajara to study accounting, remaining there until 1963 while working for the Mexican subsidiary of Mobil Oil. She then relocated to Mexico City, where she was employed first by Kraft Foods and later by the González Byass drinks company. In 1982, she settled in Ciudad Juárez.

== 8 March Group ==
In 1992 Chávez was one of several activists, along with 11 organisations, that set up an umbrella campaign group known as the 8 March Group (Grupo 8 de Marzo). It would lead calls to the government, state government and law enforcement agencies to take the issue of femicide more seriously. Chávez initially focused on her detailed record keeping of the death toll. Later Chávez would use every forum she could find to passionately denounce inertia and shame Mexican institutions into taking action. Short in stature, she was relentless and courageous in her campaigning, lobbying, and organising demonstrations, despite receiving death threats that she knew were entirely capable of being fulfilled. This campaign led to the creation of a dedicated prosecutor's office, as well as the National Commission to Prevent and Eradicate Violence against Women (es:Comisión Nacional para Prevenir y Erradicar la Violencia Contra las Mujeres).

== Casa Amiga ==
Chávez started the Casa Amiga Centro de Crisis [Friend House Crisis Centre] in Juárez in 1999, for the victims of rape or domestic violence, and for the families of murder victims. The centre offers psychological, medical, and legal assistance, along with guidance on victims’ rights and strategies for preventing further abuse. At the time this was an innovative scheme, but has been subsequently reproduced more widely across Mexico. The centre is now known as the Casa Amiga Esther Chávez Cano.

== The causes of femicide ==
There were many theories as to the factors behind Ciudad Juárez's wave of femicides. There was speculation that this was the work of a serial killer or some initiation rite for the many drug cartels that operate in the city. Chávez felt the reason was more prosaic: Juárez was home to many maquiladoras, manufacturing assembly plants, often owned by international multinational corporations. These factories allowed women to get a modest but reliable income, something that men in the area could not always achieve. Some men in Mexico, home to the concept of machismo, would struggle with this gender reversal. "Women are occupying the space of men in a culture of absolute dominance of men over women," she told the Los Angeles Times. "This has to provoke misogyny." Chávez was critical of the police and other law enforcement agencies who through incompetence or complicity seemed powerless to stop the murders.

== Death ==
Chávez died on 25 December 2009, the victim of cancer that had affected her latter years. She never married. She was survived by one of her brothers.

On the same day of her death, Eve Ensler, the American playwright who wrote the Vagina Monologues and is now known as V, paid tribute to Chávez: "She gave her life for the women and girls of Juárez. She taught me about service and humility and kindness. She was a force in our movement, a leader and a beacon and we will miss her terribly." Another friend, Mexican feminist Lydia Cacho wrote in her eulogy: "For 15 years, Esther was an international beacon, guiding the world toward Chihuahua, enabling Mexicans who chose to listen and amplify reality to narrate – not necessarily understand – the phenomenon of femicide in Mexico."

== Representation in film and literature ==
The 2009 Mexican film Backyard, known in Spanish as El Traspatio, was partly inspired by Chávez's experiences; as was Roberto Bolaño's posthumous 900 page fragmentary novel 2666. Chávez also contributed to Construyendo caminos y esperanzas, (Building paths and hopes), a book produced by Casa Amiga in 2010 after her death.

== Legacy ==
The Esther Chávez Cano Collection of documents, including Chávez's original notebooks, is now housed in over 400 box folders at the New Mexico Archives, part of New Mexico State University in Las Cruces, New Mexico. This resource, covering the period 1988 to 2006, identified the specific pattern of femicide in Juárez. Casa Amiga Esther Chávez Cano continues to record local news events daily, in order to identify ongoing gender based violence in Ciudad Juárez.

While she was still alive, in March 2007 the Esther Chávez Cano Award for social work was established. On International Women's Day, 8 March 2018, a commemorative plaque was unveiled in Ciudad Juárez, in honour of Chávez's work.

On 12 September 2017, the Chihuahua state legislature approved a law reform through Article 126 that formally defined femicide as a distinct criminal offence, making Chihuahua the last state in Mexico to adopt such legislation. This provided a 30 to 60 year prison sentence for those convicted of gender based murder. The federal penal code for Mexico as a whole recognised femicide as a crime from 2012. Enacting specific legislation against femicide was one of Chávez's key demands of the state.

The remorseless wave of killing of women and girls in Ciudad Juárez continued after Chávez's death. One women's organisation reported that between 2010 to 2023 some 4,500 people were recorded to have disappeared in the state of Chihuahua as a whole. Lydia Cordero Cabrera, executive director of Casa Amiga Esther Chávez Cano, said in 2023 that Chávez was "a pioneer in documenting existing cases and realizing that there was a very particular phenomenon of women disappearing under certain conditions and with certain characteristics". In terms of more recent trends, Cordero stated that when 98% of reported cases go unpunished, "the message is very strong; how can we expect it not to continue happening?"

== See also ==
- Femicide in Latin America
- Women in Mexico
