= Coalition for the Good of All =

Coalition for the Good of All Coalición por el Bien de Todos
- Leader: Andrés Manuel López Obrador
- Founded: 2005
- Dissolved: 2006
- Preceded by: Progressive Movement
- Ideology: Cardenism; Social democracy Left-wing nationalism Progressivism
- Political position: Left-wing

The Coalition for the Good of All (Spanish: Coalición por el Bien de Todos) was a left-wing coalition created by the Party of the Democratic Revolution (PRD), Convergence and the Labor Party (PT) to support Andrés Manuel López Obrador as a candidate for the presidency of Mexico in the general election of 2006. The coalition also presented joint candidates for Congressional and local elections.

The coalition was approved by the Federal Electoral Institute in December 2005 and on January 4, 2006 the Executive Commission of the alliance was formalized with an estimated budget of 600 million pesos (roughly US$56 million).

== History ==
The former mayor of Mexico City, Andrés Manuel López Obrador, was the presidential candidate for the Coalition for the Good of All in the 2006 presidential elections. López Obrador ran against Felipe Calderón, PAN candidate, and Roberto Madrazo, PRI candidate.

López Obrador's campaign relied on citizen's networks (redes ciudadanas) that focused on mobilizing the public to campaign. This strategy focused on López Obrador as an individual and not the PRD. This was worrisome to PRD leaders because they thought that the PRD's concerns would not be addressed. However, many party members thought that López Obrador would win so these concerns were not addressed.

After the general election of July 2, 2006, and a recount of the 9.09% of the ballot tally sheets which supposedly presented irregularities, the Federal Electoral Institute recorded the vote results in favor of Felipe Calderón by a margin of 0.58 percent, about 243,000 votes. These results were later validated by the Federal Electoral Tribunal. However, the PRD claimed that there was election fraud. The claims of election fraud have been rejected by the Federal Electoral Tribunal (TEPJF), which considered these "notoriously out of order" ("notoriamente improcedente") and certified PAN's candidate Felipe Calderón as the winner.

=== Post-election ===
López Obrador then rallied his supporters to hold demonstrations in the capital, Mexico City. These demonstrations were organized by the PRD, whose stronghold is in Mexico City. The PRD had called for demonstrations and set up camps in the capital's main square, blocking one of its main avenues (Paseo de la Reforma) for six weeks to demand a recount of all votes, which was not granted. The camps were later dismantled after confrontation with the Mexican Army became likely.

On September 5, the Federal Electoral Tribunal announced that there was not enough evidence of electoral fraud which legitimized Calderon as President. This caused López Obrador to maintain his campaign of civil disobedience and declared himself as "Legitimate President" in a "public open vote" (people in the main square raising their hands). López Obrador did not recognize the legitimacy of Calderón as president. The PRD was criticized for not complying with the democratic system that it had lauded and helped create. However, the PRD could not agree on whether they should move forward and cooperate with the current system and contribute to policy or take on an uncompromising stance in an attempt to overturn the current system. This split later trickled on to other things such as electoral and petroleum reforms where one part of the party wanted to cooperate while the other refused to out of allegiance to López Obrador.

== Electoral history ==
=== Presidential elections ===
| Election year | Candidate | # votes | % vote | Result |
|---|---|---|---|---|
| 2006 | Andrés Manuel López Obrador | 14,756,350 | 35.3 | ✗ Defeated |

=== Congressional elections ===
==== Chamber of Deputies ====
| Election year | Constituency | | PR | | No. of seats | Position | Presidency |
| Election year | Votes | % | Votes | % | No. of seats | Position | Presidency |
|---|---|---|---|---|---|---|---|
| 2006 | 11,941,842 | 29.0 | 12,013,364 | 29.0 | 158 / 500 | Minority | Felipe Calderón |

==== Senate elections ====
| Election year | Constituency | | PR | | No. of seats | Position | Presidency |
| Election year | Votes | % | Votes | % | No. of seats | Position | Presidency |
|---|---|---|---|---|---|---|---|
| 2006 | 12,292,512 | 29.7 | 12,397,008 | 29.7 | 36 / 128 | Minority | Felipe Calderón |

== See also ==
- Alliance for Mexico
