= Alejandro Solalinde =

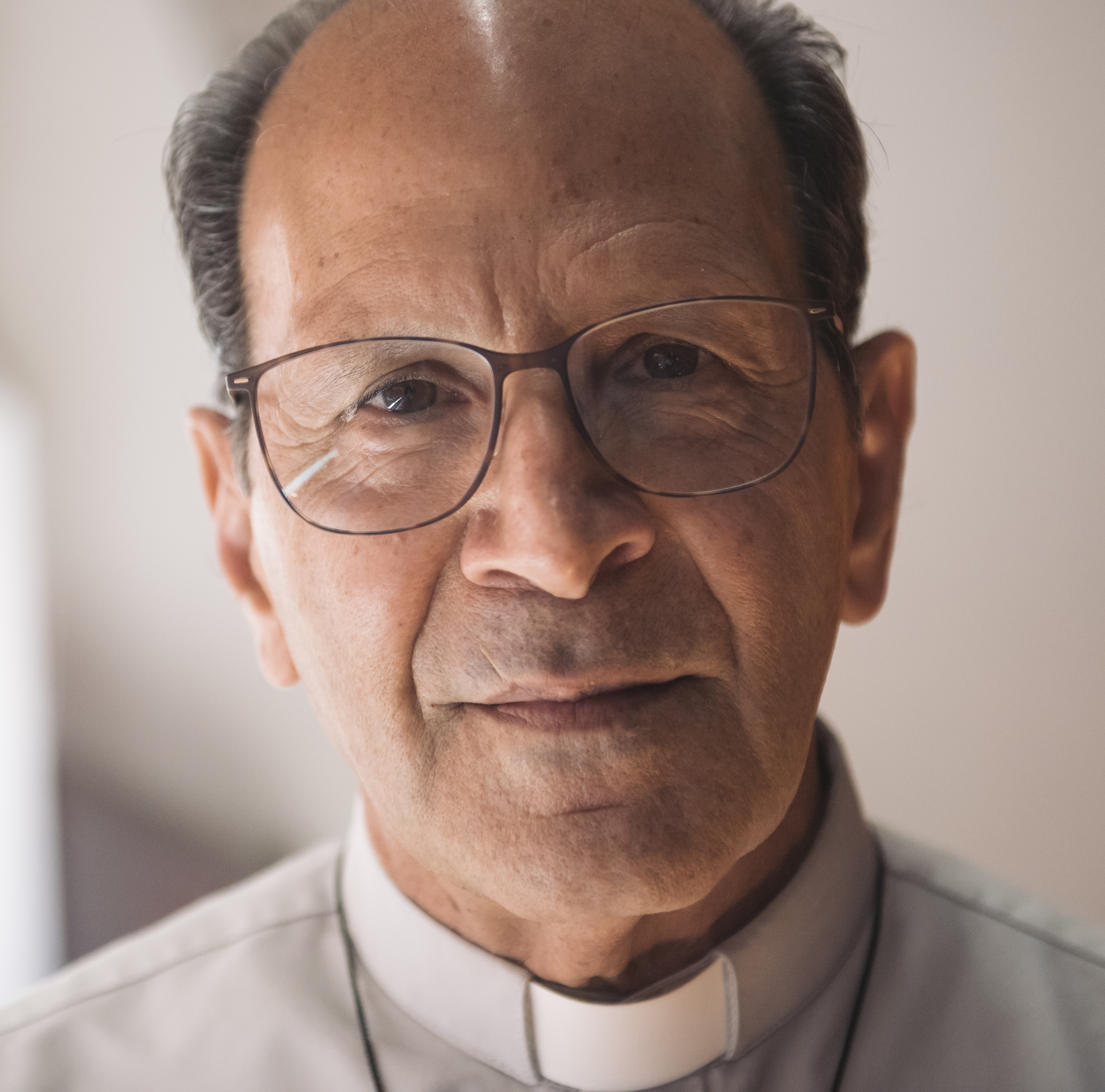
Padre Alejandro Solalinde

Alejandro Solalinde Guerra (born March 19, 1945) is a Mexican Catholic priest and human rights champion. He is the coordinator of the South Pacific Human Mobility Ministry of the Mexican Bishopric and director of Hermanos en el Camino, a shelter that provides Central American migrants with humanitarian aid and education.

== Biography ==
Solalinde was born in Texcoco, Mexico State, to Berta Guerra Muñoz and Juan Manuel Solalinde Lozano. He tried to join the Jesuits, but was dissuaded by his superiors from affiliating with an order that was "too progressive." Instead, he joined the Carmelites, only to be expelled for "rebelliousness." Following this, he joined the Institute of Ecclesiastical Studies and was ordained as a priest by Bishop Alfonse Torres Romero of Toluca. Solalinde has received bachelor's degrees in history and psychology from the Autonomous University of Mexico State, as well as a Master's in Systemic Family Therapy.

He has publicly decried the abuses committed against undocumented Latin American migrants and has been threatened multiple times by criminal organizations that traffic humans, arms, and organs. On February 26, 2007 Solalinde founded the shelter “Hermanos en el Camino” in Ciudad Ixtepec, Oaxaca, whose charge is to provide a safe place for migrants and to offer them food, shelter, medical and psychological attention, and legal aid.

He has been awarded with numerous prizes and distinctions, such as the 2011 Emilio Krieger Medal, awarded by the National Association of Democratic Lawyers (ANAD in Spanish), as well as the Peace and Democracy human rights award, the Pagés Llergo Prize for Democracy and Human Rights, and the "Lion Heart" acknowledgement from the University of Guadalajara Federation of University Students (FEU).

Solalinde left Mexico in May 2012 due to a series of threats targeting his humanitarian work.

After two months of exile, he returned to Oaxaca where he recommended that the PRI politicians undertake an act of contrition for the errors made and the abuses committed during their 71-year rule of the country, and asked president Enrique Peña Nieto to take the path of democracy. During an interview, Solalinde also recommended that the PRI not "sound the trumpets" about its questionable victory. He further criticized Oaxacan PRI governor Ulises Ruiz Ortiz of being the governor who has beaten him the most, and condemned the conduct of the Federal Electoral Institute and the "factual powers" that "impose candidates."

Solalinde met with Governor Gabino Cué and his security detail for more than two and a half hours. The executive committed to supporting the shelter directed by the prelate.

== Human Rights Award ==
In 2019, he was awarded the Geuzenpenning for his project Hermanos en el Camino in Ciudad Ixtepec, a shelter for migrants trying to cross the border between Mexico and the United States.
