= Citizens' Movement (Mexico) =

Mexican political party

Citizens' Movement Movimiento Ciudadano
- Leader: Jorge Álvarez Máynez
- Senate Leader: Clemente Castañeda Hoeflich
- Chamber Leader: Ivonne Ortega Pacheco
- Founder: Dante Delgado Rannauro
- Founded: 1 August 1999 (as CpD); 16 August 2002 (as CON); 31 July 2011 (as MC)
- Split from: Institutional Revolutionary Party
- Headquarters: Louisiana 113 Nápoles, Benito Juárez, 03810 Mexico City
- Newspaper: El Ciudadano
- Youth wing: Youth in Movement
- Membership (2026): ▼318,642
- Ideology: Social democracy; Social liberalism; Progressivism (Mexico)
- Political position: Centre-left
- National affiliation: Alliance for Mexico; (1999–2001); Coalition for the Good of All; (2005–2006); Progressive Movement; (2011–2012); Por México al Frente; (2017–2018)
- International affiliation: Progressive Alliance
- Continental affiliation: COPPPAL
- Colours: Orange and White
- Chamber of Deputies: 29 / 500
- Senate: 6 / 128
- Governorships: 2 / 32
- State legislatures: 75 / 1,123

Website
- Official website
- Politics of Mexico; Political parties; Elections; A: The Citizens' Movement has also been described as left-wing as well.

Citizens' Movement (Spanish: Movimiento Ciudadano, MC), also known as the Citizens' Movement Party, is a centre-left political party in Mexico. It was founded in 1999 under the name Convergence for Democracy, which was then shortened to Convergence in 2002 and changed to Citizens' Movement in 2011.

Established on 1 August 1999, Convergence for Democracy was founded by civil society activists and former Institutional Revolutionary Party members, advocating for a social market economy and democratic reforms to increase citizen participation in governance. Once the drug war started, the party included demilitarization efforts and drug regulation in its platform. Initially aligning with left-wing coalitions since its inception, disagreements with left-wing parties prompted the party's shift to independence in elections from 2012 onwards. However, it briefly joined an alliance during the 2018 election. Since then, it has heavily focused on sustainability and social issues in its party platform.

It is the third political force in the country, receiving 10.32% of the votes cast in the 2024 presidential election, and has yet to secure victory in a presidential race. As of 2023, it has 384,005 members, and its members are known as emecistas.

== History ==
=== Background and founding (1988–1999) ===
Citizens' Movement traces its origins to the political career and downfall of Dante Delgado Rannauro, a Veracruz politician who rose through the Institutional Revolutionary Party (PRI) under the patronage of Fernando Gutiérrez Barrios. After holding senior posts in the Veracruz state government during the 1980s, including undersecretary of government and then secretary-general of government, Delgado became substitute governor of the state from December 1988 to 1992; he took up the office when Gutiérrez Barrios stepped aside to join the cabinet of President Carlos Salinas de Gortari as federal Secretary of the Interior.

As Gutiérrez Barrios's influence within the PRI declined, Delgado lost his protection inside the party, fell out with its leadership, and resigned his membership in 1995. In December 1996, under his successor as governor, Patricio Chirinos Calero, he was arrested on charges of diverting 450 million pesos in public funds and imprisoned for about fifteen months before being exonerated. Delgado and his supporters characterized the prosecution as politically motivated persecution meant to punish his break with the PRI and to obstruct his plans to build an opposition party.

After his release, Delgado set out to turn his political following into a national party. In 1997 he registered Convergence for Democracy as a national political grouping, bringing together former PRI members disillusioned with the party's dominance and activists drawn from civil society. The grouping held its constituent assembly as a political party on 5 December 1998 and was granted registration as a national political party by the Federal Electoral Institute on 1 August 1999, with Delgado as its national leader.

The party defined itself as a vehicle for deepening Mexico's democratization, which it dated to the political reforms begun in 1982, and for giving citizens a greater role in government. In economic policy, it adopted the social market economy as its guiding framework, presenting a regulated market with active state intervention as the most effective basis for the country's development.

=== Convergence (1999–2011) ===
For much of its first decade the party functioned as a minor partner of the larger forces of the Mexican left. Lacking a national base of its own, it repeatedly joined coalitions with the Party of the Democratic Revolution (PRD) and the Labor Party (PT). These alliances allowed it to clear the 2% threshold needed to keep its national registration while gradually building name recognition and a parliamentary presence.

Convergence logo

For the 2000 presidential election, Convergence for Democracy joined other left-wing parties in the Alliance for Mexico, nominating Cuauhtémoc Cárdenas for the presidency and endorsing candidates for state offices, among them Andrés Manuel López Obrador for Head of the Federal District. Despite Cárdenas' third-place finish, López Obrador emerged victorious in his election. Over the following two years it made further gains in local elections, taking the municipal presidencies of the state capitals of Veracruz and Oaxaca, and at its second National Assembly, held in Puebla on 16 August 2002, its members voted to shorten the party's name to Convergence (CON). Running on its own in the 2003 midterm elections, CON won 2.53% of the vote and five seats in the Chamber of Deputies, enough to form its first parliamentary group, and over the following years it built up a modest base of legislators and municipal governments.

In the 2006 general election, CON formed another left-wing alliance, the Coalition for the Good of All, with the PRD and the PT. The alliance backed Andrés Manuel López Obrador, who lost to Felipe Calderón by about 0.56% of the national vote and alleged electoral fraud. López Obrador rejected the result, mounted a months-long sit-in along Paseo de la Reforma, and had himself proclaimed "legitimate president" at a parallel convention; CON joined the PRD and the PT in backing the protest and in attempting to block Calderón's inauguration. After the Federal Electoral Tribunal rejected requests for a full recount and confirmed Calderón, the three parties channeled their opposition into a joint legislative bloc, the Broad Progressive Front (FAP). The election nonetheless gave CON its largest congressional presence to that point, with seventeen federal deputies and five senators.

Calderón's 2008 energy reform, which sought to expand private participation in the state oil industry, divided the left. CON and the PT, dependent on López Obrador's electoral pull and aligned with his confrontational politics, joined his oil-defense movement against the reform; the PRD's now-dominant New Left faction, which favored a more moderate and institutional approach, distanced itself from the protests and negotiated a watered-down reform with the Institutional Revolutionary Party (PRI) and the PAN. With the New Left also backing the 2007–2008 electoral reform, which barred parties in a coalition from sharing votes and so endangered the registration of smaller forces, CON and the PT broke with the PRD and contested the 2009 legislative elections on their own, as the Salvemos a México coalition. López Obrador, by then estranged from the PRD's leadership, campaigned for CON and the PT across most of the country. The New Left faction of the PRD sidelined supporters of López Obrador, prompting many displaced activists and leaders of urban social movements to seek candidacies under CON and the PT instead of the PRD. Following the elections, the Social Democratic Party's loss of registration drew further figures from the social-democratic left toward CON, among them 2006 presidential candidate, Patricia Mercado.

In the 2010–2011 state elections, CON joined the broad opposition alliances, which spanned the PRD and the conservative PAN, that ended the PRI's hold on several states. Its senator, Gabino Cué Monteagudo, won the governorship of Oaxaca in 2010, the state's first change of ruling party in 81 years and the party's first governorship, and CON shared in the winning coalitions in Puebla and Sinaloa that year and in Guerrero in 2011.

=== Rebranding and break with López Obrador (2011–2018) ===
In 2011, at an extraordinary national assembly, the party approved a sweeping overhaul of its internal structure, name, and emblem, relaunching Convergence as Citizens' Movement (MC); the Federal Electoral Institute confirmed the change that October. It kept its orange identity, reorganized its leadership around citizen councils and operating commissions, and widened its practice of fielding non-party "citizen candidacies" open to figures from outside its ranks.

The following year it again backed Andrés Manuel López Obrador, joining the left-wing Progressive Movement alliance for the 2012 general election, in which he lost to Enrique Peña Nieto by more than 5%. López Obrador left the PRD to turn his support network into a new party, Morena; MC offered its own registration to speed the launch, but he declined and built Morena separately. In December 2012, the PRD aligned with the incoming PRI government by signing the Pact for Mexico, which MC did not join. Running on its own in the 2015 federal midterms, the party recorded its best result to that point, about 6% of the national vote, and enlarged its delegation in the Chamber of Deputies. Its gains were clearest in Jalisco, where it won the Guadalajara mayoralty with Enrique Alfaro—the first time neither the PAN nor the PRI had governed the city—kept Tlajomulco and Puerto Vallarta, and flipped Zapopan, Tlaquepaque and other municipalities to become one of the parties with the most local deputies in the state.

By 2017, the breach with López Obrador had hardened, and he publicly grouped MC among the political establishment he campaigned against, rejecting Dante Delgado's idea of a single left-wing bloc ahead of the 2018 general election. MC instead formed a big-tent electoral alliance with the Party of the Democratic Revolution (PRD) and the National Action Party (PAN); Delgado and the PRD's Raúl Flores said its goal was to place the country's interests above party politics. As part of its digital strategy, the party promoted the viral music video "Movimiento Naranja – Yuawi", which had amassed more than 54 million views on YouTube by election day. The alliance's nominee, Ricardo Anaya, lost to López Obrador, who won by a landslide. In Jalisco, MC ran on its own and Enrique Alfaro won the governorship, marking the party's first gubernatorial victory won under its own candidate without a coalition. In Nuevo León, where MC ran independently in the Senate election, it won both majority seats.

=== Third force (2018–present) ===
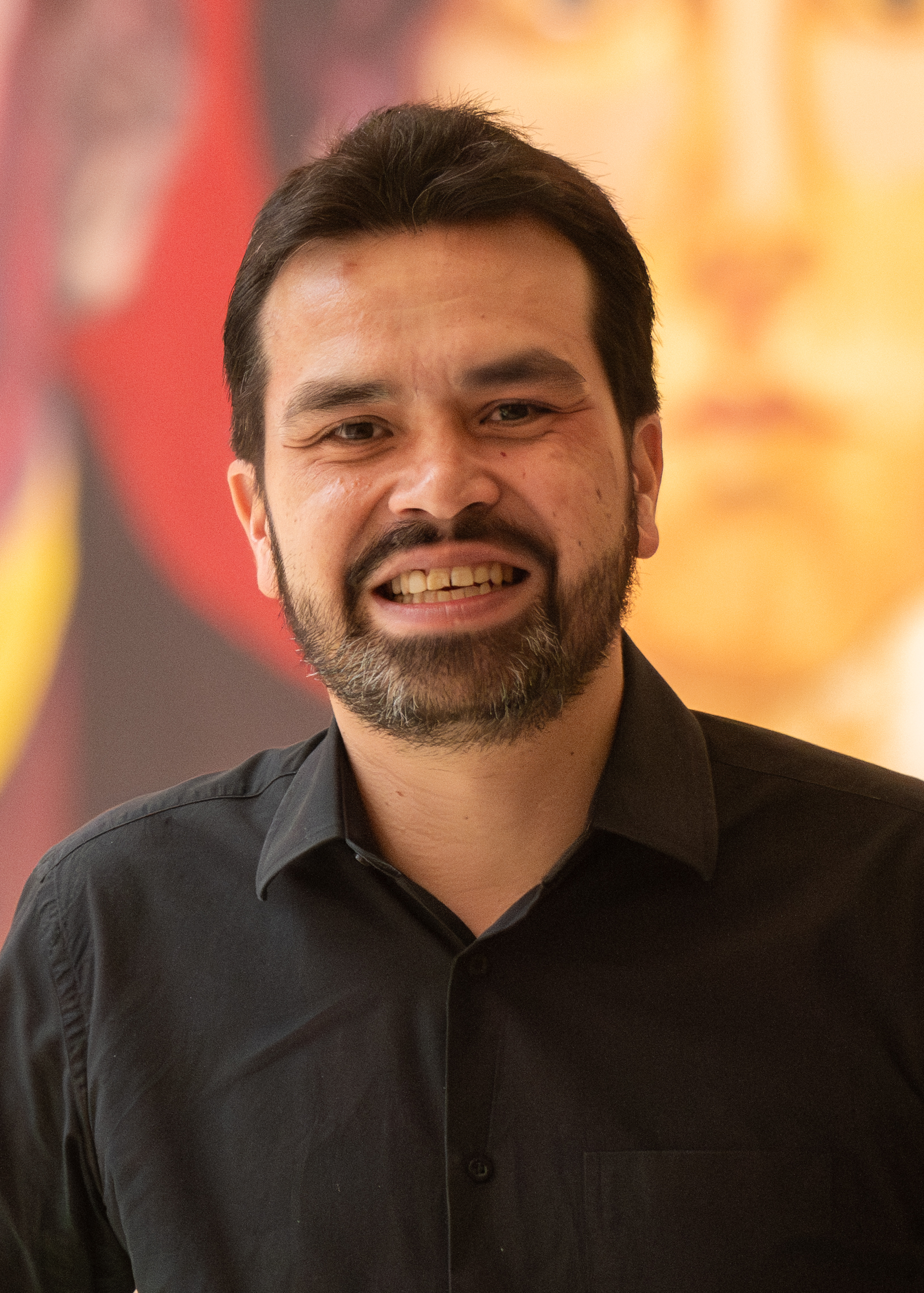
Jorge Máynez, the party's first presidential candidate to run without a coalition.

After the 2018 election, MC entered no further national coalitions and positioned itself as an independent "third force", standing apart from both the Morena-led governing bloc and the Va por México alliance of the National Action Party (PAN), the Institutional Revolutionary Party (PRI), and the Party of the Democratic Revolution (PRD). Running alone in the 2021 mid-term elections, it reached about 7% of the national vote: Samuel García won the governorship of Nuevo León, its second governorship secured without a coalition, and the party took the mayoralties of Monterrey, Guadalajara and the city of Campeche. In December 2021, Dante Delgado returned to the leadership at a national convention, at which MC ruled out joining Va por México and committed to standing as a third option between the two main blocs. In the Senate, it coordinated informally with the PAN, PRI, and PRD in a voting bloc to block the government's constitutional reform agenda: the arrangement helped defeat López Obrador's 2022 electricity reform and his electoral and security overhauls, while MC separately backed some government measures including the nationalization of lithium and the constitutionalization of social programs. The Senate voting bloc collapsed in December 2023 when PRI and PAN legislators in the Congress of Nuevo León declined to back an MC-aligned interim governor, a decision that simultaneously ended Samuel García's presidential precandidacy. García's withdrawal sharpened an existing internal divide: the Jalisco bloc, led by governor Enrique Alfaro, had favored an alliance with the formal opposition and accused the leadership of isolating the party. The party instead nominated Jorge Máynez, who campaigned on a social-democratic platform he called "new politics" of progressive taxation, a universal basic income and the gradual demilitarization of public security, aimed at young voters; Máynez finished third in the 2024 general election with about 10% of the vote, the party's strongest result in a presidential contest, and the result placed MC as the third-largest political force nationally, ahead of the PRI, though its congressional presence remained at 27 seats in the Chamber of Deputies.

Under President Claudia Sheinbaum, who took office in 2024, MC continued its congressional opposition to Fourth Transformation institutional reforms, including votes against López Obrador's judicial reform and the transfer of the National Guard to military command, while championing a 40-hour work week as its signature cause. The party continued to extend its regional base beyond its two strongholds: in Campeche it emerged as Morena's principal challenger, and in Veracruz, it emerged as the state's second electoral force in the 2025 municipal elections, winning 41 municipalities.

== Ideology ==
The party describes itself as a social democratic, but that has been in dispute for only being nominal. It has also been described as socialist, progressive, social liberal, and democratic nationalist.

In terms of political spectrum, it is described as centrist, centre-left, left-leaning, and left-wing.

== Party leaders ==
No.	Leader	Term of office		
No.	Leader	Took office	Left office	Time in office
1	Luis Walton Aburto	1 August 2011	8 September 2012	1 year, 38 days
2	Dante Delgado Rannauro	8 September 2012	2 December 2018	6 years, 85 days
3	Clemente Castañeda Hoeflich	2 December 2018	5 December 2021	3 years, 3 days
4	Dante Delgado Rannauro	5 December 2021	5 December 2024	3 years
5	Jorge Máynez	5 December 2024	Incumbent	1 year, 331 days

== Election results ==
=== Presidential elections ===
Election year	Candidate	Votes	%	Result	Note
2000	Cuauhtémoc Cárdenas	6,256,780	16.64	✗ Defeated	Support PRD candidate; alliance: Alliance for Mexico
2006	Andrés Manuel López Obrador	14,756,350	35.31	✗ Defeated	Support PRD candidate; alliance: Coalition for the Good of All
2012	Andrés Manuel López Obrador	15,848,827	31.61	✗ Defeated	Support PRD candidate; alliance: Progressive Movement
2018	Ricardo Anaya	12,610,120	22.27	✗ Defeated	Support PAN candidate; alliance: Por México al Frente
2024	Jorge Máynez	6,204,710	10.32	✗ Defeated	

=== Congressional elections ===
==== Chamber of Deputies ====
Election year	Seats (Note: The seat distribution does not take into account party switches during the legislative term.)							Electoral alliance	Presidency	Position
Election year	Constituency			Party-list			Total	Electoral alliance	Presidency	Position
Election year	Seats	Votes	%	Seats	Votes	%	Total	Electoral alliance	Presidency	Position
2000	0			2			2 / 500	Alliance for Mexico	Vicente Fox	Minority
2003	0	605,156	2.34	5	602,392	2.34	5 / 500	None	Vicente Fox	Opposition
2006	5			12			17 / 500	Coalition for the Good of All	Felipe Calderón	Opposition
2009	0	822,001	2.51	6	854,347	2.60	6 / 500	Salvemos a México	Felipe Calderón	Opposition
2012	7	2,013,180	4.25	9	2,024,528	4.26	16 / 500	Progressive Movement	Enrique Peña Nieto	Opposition
2015	10	2,412,817	6.40	15	2,431,063	6.40	25 / 500	None	Enrique Peña Nieto	Opposition
2018	17	2,473,056	4.60	10	2,484,185	4.60	27 / 500	Por México al Frente	Andrés Manuel López Obrador	Opposition
2021	7	3,425,006	7.26	16	3,449,804	7.27	23 / 500	None	Andrés Manuel López Obrador	Opposition
2024	1	6,446,537	11.34	26	6,497,404	11.34	27 / 500	None	Claudia Sheinbaum	Opposition

==== Senate elections ====
Election year	Seats							Electoral alliance	Presidency	Position
Election year	Constituency			Party-list			Total	Electoral alliance	Presidency	Position
Election year	Seats	Votes	%	Seats	Votes	%	Total	Electoral alliance	Presidency	Position
2000	0			1			1 / 128	Alliance for Mexico	Vicente Fox	Opposition
2006	3			2			5 / 128	Coalition for the Good of All	Felipe Calderón	Opposition
2012	0	2,013,180	4.25	1	2,024,528	4.26	1 / 128	Progressive Movement	Enrique Peña Nieto	Opposition
2018	2	2,621,317	4.87	5	2,654,085	4.89	7 / 128	Por México al Frente	Andrés Manuel López Obrador	Opposition
2024	2	6,460,220	11.32	3	6,528,238	11.33	5 / 128	None	Claudia Sheinbaum	Opposition

== See also ==
- Politics of Mexico
- List of political parties in Mexico
