= Labor Party (Mexico) =

Mexican political party

Labor Party Partido del Trabajo
- Abbreviation: PT
- Leader: Alberto Anaya
- Founded: 8 December 1990
- Headquarters: Mexico City
- Membership (2026): ▲590,797
- Ideology: Socialism; Maoism; Socialism of the 21st century
- Political position: Left-wing to far-left
- National affiliation: Sigamos Haciendo Historia
- Continental affiliation: COPPPAL; São Paulo Forum
- Colours: Red; Yellow
- Chamber of Deputies: 49 / 500
- Senate: 6 / 128
- Governorships: 0 / 32
- State legislatures: 88 / 1,123

Website
- Party website

The Labor Party (Spanish: Partido del Trabajo [paɾˈtiðo ðel tɾaˈβaxo], PT; also known as the Workers Party) is a socialist political party in Mexico. It was founded on 8 December 1990. The party is currently led by Alberto Anaya.

Following the 2018 election, the PT became the third-largest political party in the Chamber of Deputies with 61 deputies, after Morena with 191 and the PAN with 81. Political maneuvering briefly established the PRI as the third-largest party in August 2020, although it later turned out that the PT and the PRI were tied with 46 seats each after doubtful PRD deputy defections in favor of the PRI.

It received 6.46% of the total votes cast in the 2024 presidential election, becoming the sixth national political force. It has 49 deputies and 6 senators in the LXVI legislature of the Congress of the Union.

== History ==
=== Foundation ===
==== Initial History ====
Following the coordination of several social groups, including the Independent Teachers' Movement, the National Union of Agricultural Workers (UNTA), the National Coordinator "Plan de Ayala", the Popular Front of Struggle of Zacatecas, the Popular Front "Tierra y Libertad" of Monterrey, the Popular Defense Committees of Durango and Chihuahua, and the Popular Union of Agricultural Workers, the PT formed.

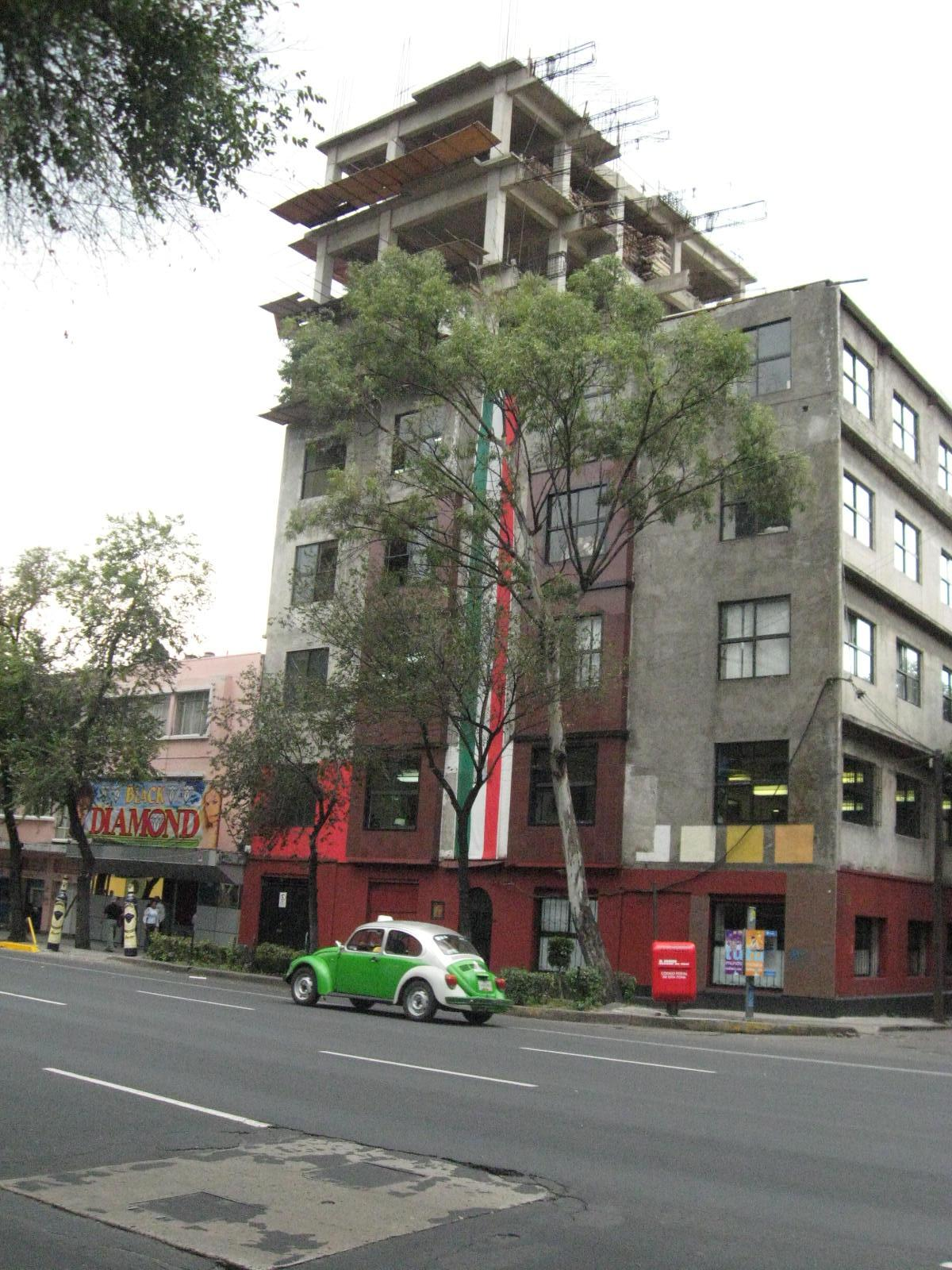
National Executive Committee's offices of the Labor Party, located at Avenida Cuauhtémoc 47 in Mexico City.

The party first participated in federal elections in 1991, but it failed to win 1.5 percent of the vote (the amount necessary to be recognized as a national party). In 1994, Cecilia Soto became the presidential candidate.

=== 1998–2006 ===
In 1998 the PT allied with the larger Democratic Revolution Party (PRD) for the first time in the state of Zacatecas. In the 2000 elections, the party took part in the PRD-led Alliance for the Good of All. As part of the Alliance, it won 7 seats in the Chamber of Deputies and 1 seat in the Senate.

The PT ran separately from the PRD in the 2003 elections for the Chamber of Deputies. The party won 2.4 percent of the popular vote and 6 out of 500 seats in the Chamber of Deputies.

In November 2005, the PT endorsed the PRD's candidate for President, Andrés Manuel López Obrador for the July 2006 elections. In these elections the party won 12 out of 500 seats in the Chamber of Deputies and 3 out of 128 Senators.

In October 2006, the PT further allied itself with the PRD and the Convergence Party to form the Broad Progressive Front (FAP for its Spanish initials), which was granted the register by the Federal Electoral Institute.

=== 2012 Mexican general election ===
In 2012 the PT supported PRD presidential candidate Andrés Manuel López Obrador.

=== 2018 Mexican general election ===
The 2018 Mexican general election was the fifth presidential election PT had participated in. Its candidate for the Presidency was Andrés Manuel López Obrador as PT formed a coalition with left-wing National Regeneration Movement (MORENA) and right-wing Social Encounter Party (PES).

==== Background ====
On 24 June 2017, the PT approved to stand for election in 2018 in an electoral alliance with MORENA, however the coalition was not officially registered before the National Electoral Institute, the electoral authorities of the country. From MORENA, the alliance was facilitated as a result of the decline of the PT candidate Óscar González Yáñez, who resigned his candidacy requesting the vote in favor of Delfina Gómez Álvarez, standard-bearer in the state elections of the State of Mexico in 2017.

At first, there was speculation about the possibility of a front grouping all the leftist parties: MORENA, PRD, PT and Citizens' Movement (MC). However, Andrés Manuel López Obrador rejected any kind of agreement due to political differences, especially after the elections in the State of Mexico, when the candidates of the PRD and MC continued with their campaigns refusing to support the candidate of MORENA. At the end of November 2017, the leaders of MORENA and the PES announced that they were in talks to form a possible alliance. In this sense, Hugo Eric Flores Cervantes, President of PES, said, "We don't negotiate with the PRI, we have two options, go alone or with MORENA."

==== Confirmation ====
On December 13, the coalition between Morena, the PT and the PES was formalized under the name Juntos Haremos Historia (English: Together we will make history). Following the signing of the agreement, Andrés Manuel López Obrador was appointed as a pre-candidate for the three political formations. It is a partial coalition that will promote López Obrador as a presidential candidate and, with respect to the legislative elections: MORENA will have to choose candidates in 150 federal electoral districts and 32 districts to the Senate; 75 deputies and 16 senators for PT and 75 deputies and 16 senators for the PES.

The alliance has received criticism as it is a coalition between two leftist parties (MORENA and the PT) with a formation related to the evangelical right (PES). In response, the national president of MORENA, Yeidckol Polevnsky, mentioned that her party believes in inclusion, joint work to "rescue Mexico" and that they will continue to defend human rights, while Hugo Eric Flores Cervantes, national president of the PES, mentioned that "the only possibility of real change in our country is the one headed by Andrés Manuel López Obrador" and that his party had decided to put "on the right side of history."

== Platform and principles ==
The current party platform seeks to maintain the policies of the so-called "4T". These policies aim to deepen federalism and decentralize federal government duties. It encourages a socialist market economy as an alternative to neo-liberalism. It advocates for judicial reform, including the election of ministers by popular vote. To reform the educational system, they seek to incorporate socialist, left-wing, and progressive organizations. Through its relationships with the Community of Latin American and Caribbean States, it aims to advance Latin Americanism in international politics. They propose the formal recognition of the State of Palestine. The PT is also opposed to capitalism, believing it to be an unjust system.

== Election results ==
=== Presidential elections ===
Election year	Candidate	# votes	% vote	Result	Note
1994	Cecilia Soto González	970,121	2.75	✗ Defeated	
2000	N/A			✗ Defeated	Supported PRD candidate; Coalition: ApM
2006	Andrés Manuel López Obrador (PRD)			✗ Defeated	Supported PRD candidate; Coalition: CBT
2012	Andrés Manuel López Obrador (PRD)			✗ Defeated	Supported PRD candidate; Coalition: FAP
2018	Andrés Manuel López Obrador (MORENA)	24,127,451	52.96	✓ Won	Supported Morena candidate; Coalition: JHH
2024	Claudia Sheinbaum (MORENA)	35,924,519	61.18	✓ Won	Supported Morena candidate; Coalition: SHH

=== Congressional elections ===
==== Chamber of Deputies ====
Election year	Constituency		PR		# of seats	Position	Presidency	Note
Election year	votes	%	votes	%	# of seats	Position	Presidency	Note
1994	896,426	2.7	909,251	2.7	10 / 500	Minority	Ernesto Zedillo	
1997	748,869	2.6	756,125	2.6	7 / 500	Minority	Ernesto Zedillo	
2000	see: Party of the Democratic Revolution				7 / 500	Minority	Vicente Fox	Coalition: Alliance for Mexico
2003	640,724	2.5	642,290	2.5	6 / 500	Minority	Vicente Fox	
2006	see: Party of the Democratic Revolution				12 / 500	Minority	Felipe Calderón	Coalition: Coalition for the Good of All
2009	1,264,210	3.7	1,268,125	3.7	13 / 500	Minority	Felipe Calderón	
2012	77,233	0.01	2,219,228	4.55	15 / 500	Minority	Enrique Peña Nieto	Coalition: Broad Progressive Front
2015	665,597	1.76	1,134,439	2.84	6 / 500	Minority	Enrique Peña Nieto	Coalition: Broad Progressive Front
2018	51,260	0.09	2,164,442	3.82	61 / 500	Majority	Andrés Manuel López Obrador	Coalition: Juntos Haremos Historia
2021	538,832	1.10	1,594,828	3.24	38 / 500	Majority	Andrés Manuel López Obrador	Coalition: Juntos Hacemos Historia
2024	507,604	0.89	3,254,718	5.68	51 / 500	Majority	Claudia Sheinbaum	Coalition: Sigamos Haciendo Historia

Due to a number of party changes among legislators, in September 2020 the PT became tied for the third-largest political party in the Chamber of Deputies, after Morena and the PAN, but tied with the PRI, with 34 seats each.

==== Senate elections ====
Election year	Constituency		PR		# of seats	Position	Presidency	Note
Election year	votes	%	votes	%	# of seats	Position	Presidency	Note
1994			977,072	2.9	0 / 128	Minority	Ernesto Zedillo	
1997			745,881	2.6	1 / 128	Minority	Ernesto Zedillo	
2000	see: Party of the Democratic Revolution				1 / 128	Minority	Vicente Fox	Coalition: Alliance for Mexico
2006	see: Party of the Democratic Revolution				0 / 128	Minority	Felipe Calderón	Coalition: Coalition for the Good of All
2012			2,339,923	4.9	4 / 128	Minority	Enrique Peña Nieto	Coalition: Broad Progressive Front
2018			2,164,442	3.82	6 / 128	Minority	Andrés Manuel López Obrador	Coalition: Juntos Haremos Historia
2024	1,215,172	2.13	3,214,708	5.58	9 / 128	Majority	Claudia Sheinbaum	Coalition: Sigamos Haciendo Historia
