= List of heads of government of Mexico City =

Head of Government of Mexico City
- Jefatura de Gobierno de la Ciudad de México
- Current seal of the Head of Government Office

- Coat of arms of Mexico City

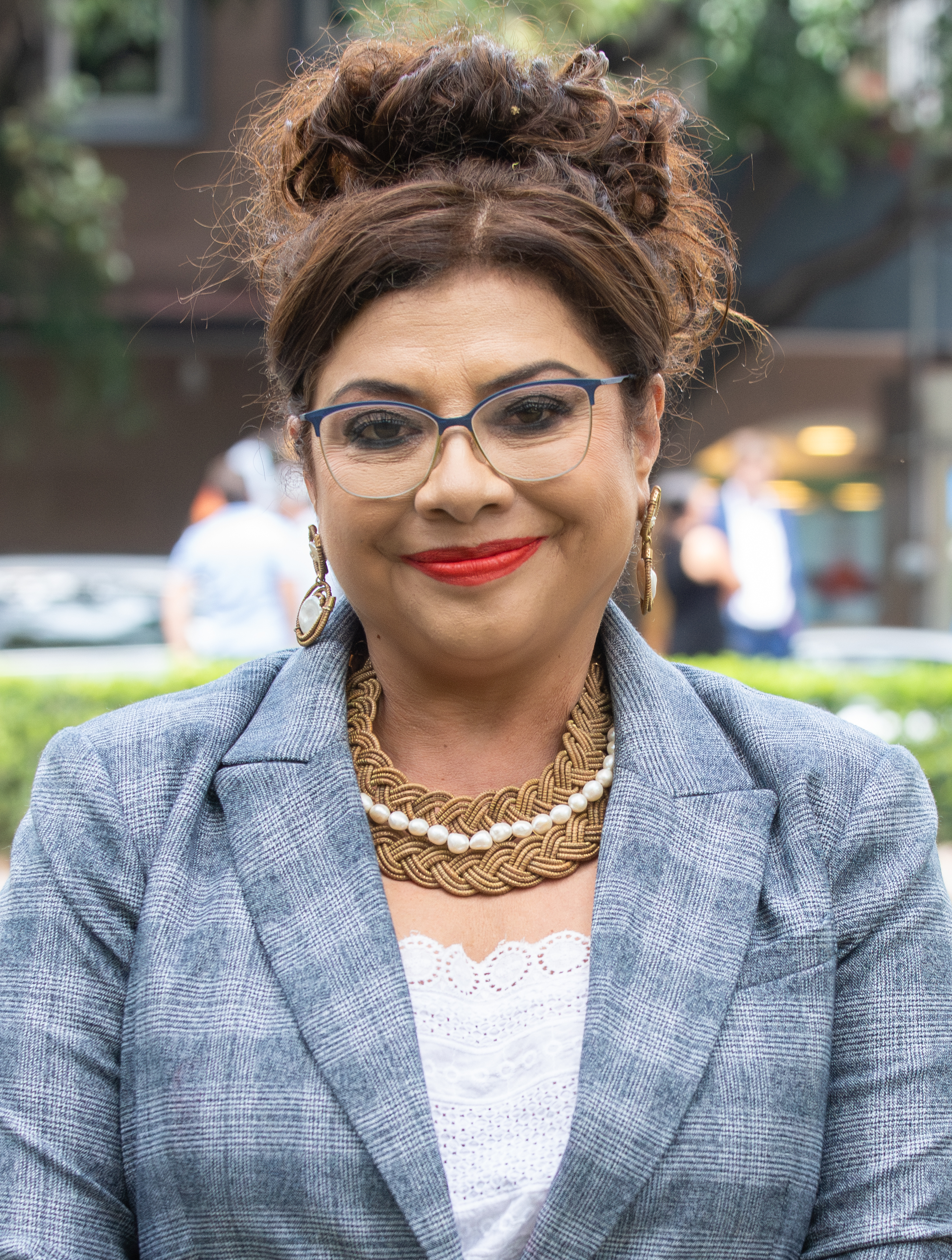
- Incumbent; Clara Brugada since 5 October 2024
- Appointer: Popular vote
- Term length: 6 years, non-renewable
- Inaugural holder: Cuauhtémoc Cárdenas
- Formation: 5 December 1997
- Website: www.cdmx.gob.mx (in Spanish)

The head of government (masculine Spanish: jefe de gobierno, feminine: jefa de gobierno) wields executive power in Mexico City. The head of government serves a six-year term, running concurrently with that of the president of the United Mexican States. Mexico City, or CDMX, is the seat of national government, and is largely contiguous with the core of the sprawling Mexico City conurbation.

== Background ==
According to Article 122 of the Constitution, "the Head of Government of the Federal District shall be responsible for executive power and public administration in the district and shall be represented by a single individual, elected by universal, free, direct, and secret suffrage."

The title is commonly rendered in English as "mayor of Mexico City" but in reality the position corresponds more to a state governor than a mayor of a municipality. Even though the position is called head of government, it has the rank of a state governor, and its incumbent is a member of the National Governors Conference.

For the greater part of the 20th century, the D.F. was administered directly by the president of the Republic, who delegated his authority to an appointed head of the Federal District Department, known more commonly (and tersely) as the regente ("regent" in English). This non-democratic imposition was a source of constant and often bitter resentment among the inhabitants of Mexico City. Under the reforms of the state introduced by presidents Carlos Salinas and Ernesto Zedillo, the regent was replaced by the first directly elected head of government in 1997.

On 6 July 1997, with a 47.7% share of the vote in an eight-candidate race, Cuauhtémoc Cárdenas won the first direct head of government election (this first term was to last only three years, to bring the office into line with the presidential succession). Cárdenas, who was also the son of well renowned former Mexican President Lázaro Cárdenas, would then become the first ever elected head of government for Mexico City after being sworn into office on December 5, 1997. However, his time as head of government would also be marred by numerous administrative failures. Cárdenas later resigned to compete in the 2000 presidential campaign and left in his place Rosario Robles, who served out the remainder of his term.

The head of government elected for the 2000–2006 term was Andrés Manuel López Obrador, elected with 39% of the popular vote in the same election that saw Vicente Fox of the PAN win the presidency. López Obrador was temporarily removed from office by the federal Congress on 7 April 2005 and was replaced, on an interim basis for a period of slightly over two weeks, by his secretary of government, Alejandro Encinas. See desafuero of Andrés Manuel López Obrador.

All the heads of the Federal District Department since the enactment of the 1917 Constitution were members of the Institutional Revolutionary Party (PRI) or its predecessor parties, and all the popularly elected heads of government since 1997 have been from center-left parties or party coalitions.

== List of governors of the Federal District's territory from 1824 to 1997 ==
=== Governors of the Federal District ===
- Melchor Múzquiz 9 January 1824
- Manuel Gómez Pedraza 3 March 1824

=== Governors of the Federal District (1824 Constitution) ===
- Gen. Jose Maria Mendivil 25 November 1825
- Juan Manuel de Elizalde 26 August 1826
- Francisco Molinos del Campo: 2 September 1826
- Juan Manuel de Elizalde: 2 October 1826 (2nd time)
- José Ignacio Esteva 1 January 1828
- José María Tornel 23 February 1828
- José Ignacio Esteva 3 December 1828 (2nd time)
- Agustín de F. Lebrija 30 January 1830
- Miguel Cervantes 20 February 1830
- Francisco Fagoaga 18 February 1831
- Ignacio Martínez: 14 October 1832
- José Joaquín de Herrera 9 January 1833
- José Ignacio Esteva 17 April 1833 (3rd time)
- José María Tornel 24 November 1833 (2nd time)
- Ramón Rayón 12 January 1835
- José Gómez de la Cortina: 13 October 1835
- Manuel Fernández Madrid: 15 October 1836
- Francisco García Conde: 26 October 1836
- Luis G. Vieyra: 9 March 1837

=== Governors of the Department of Mexico (Centralist Era) ===
- Agustín Vicente Eguia 30 December 1837
- José María Icaza: 20 September 1838
- José Fernando de Peredo 30 December 1838
- Luis G. Vieyra 8 January 1839 (2nd Attempt)
- Miguel González Calderón 11 January 1840
- Luis G. Vieyra 30 April 1840 (3rd Attempt)
- José María Barrera 16 March 1841
- Luis G. Vieyra 31 July 1841 (4th Occasion)
- Francis O. Zarate: 19 September 1841
- Luis G. Vieyra: 9 October 1841 (5th Occasion)
- Valentín Canalizo 10 March 1843
- Manuel Rincón: 3 October 1843
- Ignacio Inclán 3 December 1843

=== Governors of the Federal District (Reinstatement) ===
- José Guadalupe Covarrubias 7 December 1846
- Vicente Romero: 4 January 1847
- Juan José Baz 13 January 1847
- José Ramón Malo 17 February 1847

=== City Council of Mexico (U.S. Invasion) ===
- Manuel Reyes Veramendi: 8 September 1847
- Francisco Suárez Iriarte 18 January 1847
- Juan M. Flores y Terán 6 March 1848
- José Ramón Malo: 5 November 1848 (2nd time)

=== Head of the Federal District (U.S. Occupation) ===
- Winfield Scott: 14 September 1847
- William O. Butler 18 February 1848
- Stephen W. Kearny 16 March 1848

=== Governors of the Federal District (Reinstatement) ===
- Pedro Torrín: 14 May 1849
- Pedro María de Anaya 10 July 1849
- Miguel Azcarate: 2 January 1850
- Antonio Díaz Bonilla: 21 October 1854
- Juan José Baz: 5 January 1856 (2nd time)

=== Governors of the Federal District (Constitution of 1857) ===
- Augustín Alcerreca: 4 October 1857 (2nd time)

=== Governors of the Department of Mexico (Reform War) ===
Conservatives

- Rómulo Díaz de la Vega 20 December 1859
- Francisco G. Casanova 29 February 1860

=== Governors of the Federal District (Constitution of 1857) ===
- Justino Fernández Mondoño 6 January 1861
- Juan José Baz 25 June 1861 (2nd time)
- Anastasio Parrodi 8 January 1862
- Ángel Frías 27 April 1862
- José María González de Mendoza: 24 May 1862
- José Silvestre Aramberri: 20 September 1862
- Manuel Terreros 11 November 1862
- Ponciano Arriaga 23 January 1863
- José María González de Mendoza 1 March 1863 (2nd time)
- Gen. John J. de la Garza, John H. Mateos, Joaquin Mayor and Manuel Ramos, May 1863
- Miguel María Azcarate 12 June 1863
- Manuel García Aguirre: 30 June 1863

=== Governors of the Department of Mexico (2nd Empire) ===
- José del Villar Bocanegra: 4 November 1863
- Manuel Campero: 9 April 1866
- Mariano Icaza: 20 September 1866
- Tomás O'Horán: 30 September 1866

=== Governors of the Federal District (Constitution of 1857, Restored Republic) ===
- Porfirio Díaz 15 June 1867 (Military Governor)
- Juan José Baz 14 August 1867 (2nd time)
- Francisco A. Vélez: 7 September 1869
- Francisco Paz 27 January 1871
- Gabino Bustamante 17 March 1871
- Alfredo Chavero 15 June 1871
- José María Castro: 19 September 1871
- Tiburcio Montiel: 21 October 1871
- Joaquín A. Pérez: 29 September 1873
- Protasio G. Tagle 22 November 1876
- Agustín del Río: 30 November 1876
- Juan Crisostomo Bonilla: 7 February 1877
- Gen. Luis C. Curiel 16 February 1877
- Carlos Pacheco Villalobos 2 December 1880
- Ramón Fernández: 25 June 1881
- Carlos Rivas: 5 May 1884
- General José Ceballos: 3 December 1884
- Manuel Domínguez: 19 April 1893
- Manuel Terreros
- Pedro Rincón Gallardo 17 July 1893
- Nicolás Islas y Bustamante: 3 August 1896
- Rafael Rebollar: 8 August 1896
- Guillermo de Landa y Escandón: 8 October 1900
- Ramón Corral: 8 December 1900
- Guillermo de Landa y Escandón: 3 January 1903 (2nd time)
- Gen. Samuel García Cuéllar: 3 May 1911

=== Governors of the Federal District (Constitution of 1857, Madero Revolution) ===
- Alberto García Granados: 30 May 1911
- Ignacio Rivero: 3 August 1913
- Federico González Garza 21 August 1912

=== Governors of the Federal District (Constitution of 1857, Government of Victoriano Huerta) ===
- Gen. Cepeda and Gen. Alberto Yarza: 3 February 1913 (generals responsible for the city after the Ten Tragic Days)
- Gen. Samuel García Cuéllar 24 February 1913 (2nd time)
- Ramón Corona 28 February 1914
- Gen. Eduardo Iturbide: 28 March 1914

=== Governors of the Federal District (Constitution of 1857 Constitutionalist Revolution) ===
- Alfredo Robles Domínguez 18 August 1914
- Gen. Heriberto Jara: 19 September 1914
- Juan Gutiérrez R. 22 November 1914

=== Governors of the Federal District (Constitution of 1857, the Government Conventional) ===
- Vicente Navarro: 26 November 1914 (Zapatista)
- Manuel Chao: 4 December 1914 (Zapatista)
- Vito Alessio Robles 1 January 1915
- Gildardo Magaña Cerda 15 March 1915

=== Governor of Valle de Mexico (Const. 1857, Constitutional Government) ===
- Gen. César López de Lara: 3 August 1915

=== Governors of the Federal District (Constitution of 1917) ===
- Col. Gonzalo G. de la Mata: 3 April 1917 (Interim)
- Gen. César López de Lara: 3 June 1917 (2nd time)

=== Governors of the Federal District (Carrancistas) ===
- Alfredo Breceda 22 January 1918
- Arnulfo González 28 August 1918
- Alfredo Breceda 21 January 1919 (2nd time)
- Benito Flores 26 February 1919
- Manuel Rueda Magro: 31 May 1919

=== Governors of the Federal District (Obregón) ===
- Manuel Gómez Noriega: 8 May 1920
- Gen. Celestino Gasca 7 July 1920
- Jorge Prieto Laurens: 1922
- Ramón Ross: 25 October 1923
- Abel S. Rodríguez: 15 December 1923 (Interim)
- Ramon Ross: 11 February 1924 (2nd time)
- Gen. Francisco R. Serrano 21 June 1926
- Primo Villa Michel June 1927 until 31 December 1928.

=== Heads of the Federal District Department (Regents 1929–1940) ===
- (1929–1930): José Manuel Puig Casauranc
- (1930): Crisóforo Ibáñez
- (1930–1931): Lamberto Hernández
- (1931): Enrique Romero Courtade
- (1931–1932): Lorenzo Hernández
- (1932): Vicente Estrada Cajigal
- (1932): Manuel Padilla
- (1932) Juan G. Cabral
- (1932–1935): Aarón Sáenz
- (1935–1938): Cosme Hinojosa
- (1938–1940): José Siurob Ramírez

=== Governor of the Federal District (Regents) ===
- (1940–1946): Javier Rojo Gómez

=== Heads of the Federal District Department (Regents) ===
- (1946–1952): Fernando Casas Alemán
- (1952–1966): Ernesto P. Uruchurtu
- (1966–1970): Alfonso Corona del Rosal
- (1970–1971): Alfonso Martínez Domínguez
- (1971–1976): Octavio Sentíes Gómez
- (1976–1982): Carlos Hank González
- (1982–1988): Ramón Aguirre Velázquez
- (1988–1993): Manuel Camacho Solís
- (1993–1994): Manuel Aguilera Gómez
- (1994–1997): Óscar Espinosa Villarreal

== Popularly elected heads of government of the Federal District/Mexico City ==
Head of Government	Term in office	Election	Political Party
Cuauhtémoc Cárdenas (1934–2026)	5 December 1997 – 28 September 1999 (resigned)	1997	Party of the Democratic Revolution
Rosario Robles (b. 1956) (substitute)	29 September 1999 – 4 December 2000	—	Party of the Democratic Revolution
Andrés Manuel López Obrador (b. 1953)	5 December 2000 – 29 July 2005 (resigned)	2000	Party of the Democratic Revolution
Alejandro Encinas (b. 1954) (substitute)	2 August 2005 – 4 December 2006	—	Party of the Democratic Revolution
Marcelo Ebrard (b. 1959)	5 December 2006 – 4 December 2012	2006	Party of the Democratic Revolution
Miguel Ángel Mancera (b. 1966)	5 December 2012 – 29 March 2018 (resigned)	2012	Party of the Democratic Revolution
José Ramón Amieva (b. 1972) (substitute)	29 March 2018 – 4 December 2018	—	Party of the Democratic Revolution
Claudia Sheinbaum (b. 1962)	5 December 2018 – 16 June 2023 (resigned)	2018	National Regeneration Movement
Martí Batres (b. 1967) (substitute)	16 June 2023 – 4 October 2024	—	National Regeneration Movement
Clara Brugada (b. 1963)	5 October 2024 – Incumbent	2024	National Regeneration Movement

== See also ==
- List of Mexican state governors
- 2006 Mexican Federal District election
- 2012 Federal District of Mexico head of government election
- List of governors of dependent territories in the 20th century
