= Calderón =

Calderón (pronounced [kaldeˈɾon]) is a Spanish and occupational surname. It is derived from the Vulgar Latin "caldaria" ("cauldron") and refers to the occupation of tinker.

"Calderón" without any further specifics usually refers to Pedro Calderón de la Barca, the Spanish dramatist.

Calderón, or Calderon, may also refer to:

- Alberto Calderón, Argentine mathematician
- Alfonso Calderon (activist), Spanish born activist and advocate for gun control
- Alfonso Calderón (poet), Chilean poet and writer
- Altagracia Calderón, Mexican nurse and militant
- Arley Calderón (born 1999), Cuban weightlifter
- Bernardo Calderón Cabrera, Mexican architect
- Cecilia Calderón Prieto (born 1949), Ecuadorian economist
- Charles Calderon (born 1950), California lawyer and politician, brother of Ron
- Cleofé Calderón, Argentine botanist
- Diego de Landa Calderón, an early bishop in the Yucatán
- Elena Amat Calderón (1910–2006), Spanish university professor and archivist
- Felipe Calderón, President of Mexico
- Felipe G. Calderón, Filipino constitutionalist
- Francisco García Calderón, President of Peru in 1881
- Francisco García Calderón Rey, Peruvian writer and diplomat, representative at the Evian Conference in 1938
- Frida Kahlo y Calderón, Mexican painter
- Gabriel Díaz Vara Calderón, bishop of Santiago de Cuba (1671–1676)
- Graciela Calderón, Argentine activist
- Graciela Calderón (botanist) (1931–2022), Mexican botanist
- Iñigo Calderón, Spanish footballer playing at Brighton & Hove Albion
- Iván Calderón (boxer), Puerto Rican boxer
- Iván Calderón (baseball), Puerto Rican baseball player
- Jorge Calderón, long-time musical collaborator with Warren Zevon
- José Calderón (basketball), Spanish basketball player
- José Luis Calderón, Argentine footballer
- José Luis Calderón Cabrera, Mexican architect
- José Manuel Calderón (musician), Dominican singer, songwriter and musician
- Juan Manuel Santos Calderón, President of Colombia
- Julio Meléndez Calderón (born 1942), Peruvian football player
- María Calderón, Spanish actor
- Marcos Calderón (1928–1987), Peruvian football player and manager
- Mercedes Calderón, Cuban volleyball player
- Ofer Calderon, Israeli former hostage
- Paco Calderón, Mexican political cartoonist
- Paul Calderón, American actor
- Pedro Calderón de la Barca, Spanish dramatist
- Pedro Ignacio Calderón (1933–2026), Argentine conductor
- Philip Hermogenes Calderon, British painter of Spanish origin
- Rafael Ángel Calderón Guardia, president of Costa Rica from 1940 to 1944
- Rafael Ángel Calderón Fournier, president of Costa Rica from 1990 to 1994; son of the above
- Ramón Calderón, former Real Madrid president
- Ron Calderon (born 1957), California politician, brother of Charles
- Ruth Calderon (born 1961), Israeli scholar and politician
- Serafín Estébanez Calderón, Spanish author (1799–1867)
- Sila María Calderón, Governor of the Commonwealth of Puerto Rico (2000–2004)
- Tatiana Calderón, Colombian racing driver
- Tego Calderón, Puerto Rican rapper
- Vicente Calderón, former Atlético Madrid president
- Wilmer Calderon, (born 1975) Puerto Rican-American actor

== See also ==
- Calderone
