= Calderone =

Calderone is an Italian-language occupational surname. It is derived from the Vulgar Latin "caldaria" ("cauldron") and refers to the occupation of tinker.

== Notable people ==
- Antonino Calderone (1935–2013), Sicilian Mafioso who turned state witness in 1987
- Christian Calderone (born 1977), German politician
- Eric Calderone (born 1985), American guitarist and YouTuber
- Giuseppe Calderone (1925–1978), influential Sicilian mafioso from Catania
- Marina Elvira Calderone (born 1965), Italian politician
- Mary Calderone (1904–1998), physician and public health advocate
- Salvatore Calderone (1876–1929), American businessman
- Victor Calderone (born 1967), house music producer and DJ from Brooklyn, New York
- Angelina Calderone (born 1929 or 1930), grandmother of Lady Gaga and father of Joe Germanotta
  - Jo Calderone, male alter ego of Lady Gaga

=== Caldarone ===
- Blossom Caldarone (born 1999), English musician
- Frank Calderone (1932–2013), known professionally as Frank D'Rone, American jazz musician
- Sandra Caldarone (born 1972), Belgian musician

== See also ==
- Calderone Concert Hall, defunct music venue in New York City
- Calderone glacier in the Gran Sasso d’Italia mountain group in Abruzzo, Italy
- Calderón
