= Batopilas =

Batopilas may refer to:

- Batopilas, Chihuahua, a town in the state of Chihuahua, Mexico, and seat of Batopilas Municipality
- Batopilas Municipality, a municipality in the state of Chihuahua, Mexico
- Batopilas River
