= Amat (surname) =

Amat is a surname of Occitan and Catalan origin meaning "beloved". Notable bearers of the name include:

- Anna Aguilar-Amat (born 1962), Spanish writer
- Carlos Oquendo de Amat (1905–1936), Peruvian poet
- Elena Amat Calderón (1910–2006), Spanish university professor and archivist
- Félix Torres Amat (1772–1849), Spanish Bishop
- Jaume Amat (born 1970), Spanish field hockey player
- Jean-Charles Roman d'Amat (1887–1976), French librarian and historian
- Jean-Pierre Amat (born 1962), French sports shooter
- Joaquim Amat-Piniella (1913–1974), Spanish writer and politician
- Jordi Amat, multiple people
- Josefa Carpena-Amat, known as Pepita Carpeña (1919–2005), Spanish trade unionist, writer and anarchist
- Juan Amat (1946–2022), Spanish field hockey player
- Kiko Amat (born 1971), Spanish writer
- Luigi Amat di San Filippo e Sorso (1796–1878), Italian dean of the College of Cardinals
- Manuel de Amat y Junient (1707–1782), Spanish military officer
- Pancho Amat (born 1950), Cuban tres musician
- Pascual Amat y Esteve (1856–1928), Spanish politician, military figure and lawyer
- Pedro Amat (born 1940), Spanish field hockey player
- Pietro Amat di San Filippo (1826–1895) Italian geographer, historian and bibliographer
- Pol Amat (born 1978), Spanish field hockey player
- Rafael de Amat i de Cortada (1746–1819), Baron of Malda, Spanish writer
- Santiago Amat (1896–1982), Spanish competitive sailor
- Thaddeus Amat y Brusi (1810–1878), first Bishop of Los Angeles, California
- Yamid Amat (born 1941), Colombian journalist
