= Hinojosa =

Hinojosa may refer to:

== People ==
- C.J. Hinojosa (born 1994), American baseball player
- Christin Hinojosa (born 1975), American actress and activist
- Gilberto Hinojosa (born 1952), American politician
- Gina Hinojosa (born 1973), American politician, first Latina elected governor of Texas
- Maria Hinojosa (born 1969), Mexican-American journalist
- Ricardo Hinojosa (born 1950), U.S. federal judge and Chairman of United States Sentencing Commission
- Rubén Hinojosa (born 1940), American politician
- Tish Hinojosa (born 1955), American singer/songwriter
- Griselda Hinojosa (1875–1959), Chilean pharmacist
- Inés de Hinojosa (1540–1571), Venezuelan hacendada
- José María Hinojosa Lasarte (1904–1936), Spanish poet and Carlist/Agrarian political militant
- Juan Armando Hinojosa (born 1956), Mexican construction contractor and multiple-business operator
- Juan de Hinojosa Ferrer (1886–1955), Spanish Supreme Court judge and legal scholar

== Places in the United States ==
- Hinojosa Site, Texas archeological site on the National Register of Historic Places

== Places in Spain ==
- Hinojosa del Duque, province of Córdoba, Andalusia
- Hinojosa de Jarque, province of Teruel, Aragón
- Hinojosa del Valle, province of Badajoz, Extremadura
- La Hinojosa, province of Cuenca
- Hinojosas de Calatrava, province of Ciudad Real
- Hinojosa de San Vicente, province of Toledo
- Hinojosa de Duero, province of Salamanca
- Hinojosa del Campo, province of Soria
