= Luisa María Calderón =

Mexican politician ((born 1956)

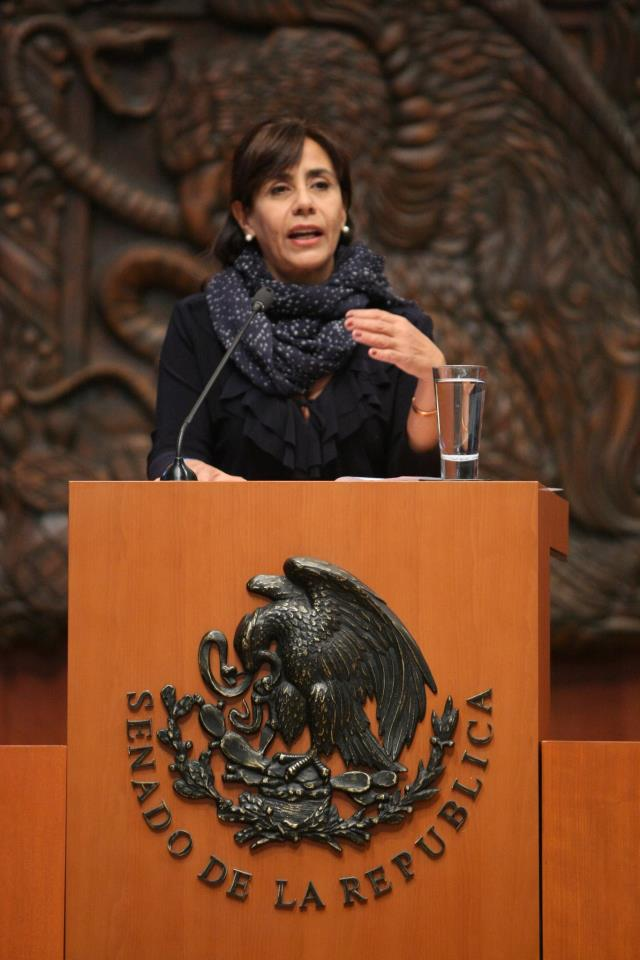
Luisa María de Guadalupe Calderón

Luisa María de Guadalupe Calderón Hinojosa (Note: In this Mexican name, the surname is Calderón and the second or maternal family name is Hinojosa.) (born 23 October 1956) is a Mexican politician affiliated with the National Action Party (PAN) who served in the Senate of Mexico from 2000 until September 2006. She served a second term in the Senate from 2012 to 2018. "Cocoa" (her nickname) is known as a champion for women and minority rights throughout Mexico.

== Personal life ==
Born on 23 October 1956 in Mexico City, Luisa María belongs to a family of prominent Mexican politicians. She is the sister of former president Felipe Calderón Hinojosa and Juan Luis Calderón Hinojosa.

She studied psychology at the Instituto Tecnológico de Estudios Superiores de Occidente (ITESO) in Tlaquepaque, Jalisco, and has pursued graduate studies at the Universidad Iberoamericana.

Luisa María is a single mother.

== Political career ==
Calderón joined the National Action Party in 1976. She served as a local deputy in the Congress of Michoacán from 1983 to 1986 and served in the federal Chamber of Deputies during the 54th Congress. In 2000 she was elected via proportional representation to serve as a Senator during the 58th and the 59th Congresses.

=== 2011 Michoacan gubernatorial race ===
In 2011, Luisa Calderón ran for Governor of Michoacán in a highly contested race. Although she lost, the election was marred with accusations of corruption by the PRI and intimidation by narco-affiliated criminals. She was the candidate of the PAN-PANAL coalition. Calderón narrowly lost against PRI candidate Fausto Vallejo Y Figueroa by less than 3 percent of the vote. She had led most opinion polls prior to the election, which was held on 13 November 2011. Vallejo received 35% of the vote, while Calderon won 33% for second place. Calderón, who led most opinion polls prior to the election, claimed that drug traffickers based in Michoacán helped tip the election in Vallejo's favor.
