= Altagracia (given name) =

Altagracia is a Spanish feminine name, originating from "Our Lady of Altagracia", an epithet of Mary, mother of Jesus. Notable people with the name include:

- Altagracia Calderón (1837–1917), Mexican nurse and militant
- Altagracia Contreras (born 1974), Dominican judoka
- Gina Altagracia Mambrú Casilla (born 1986), Dominican volleyball player

== See also ==
- Altagracia (disambiguation)
