= Jean-Baptiste Marc Bourgery =

French physician and anatomist

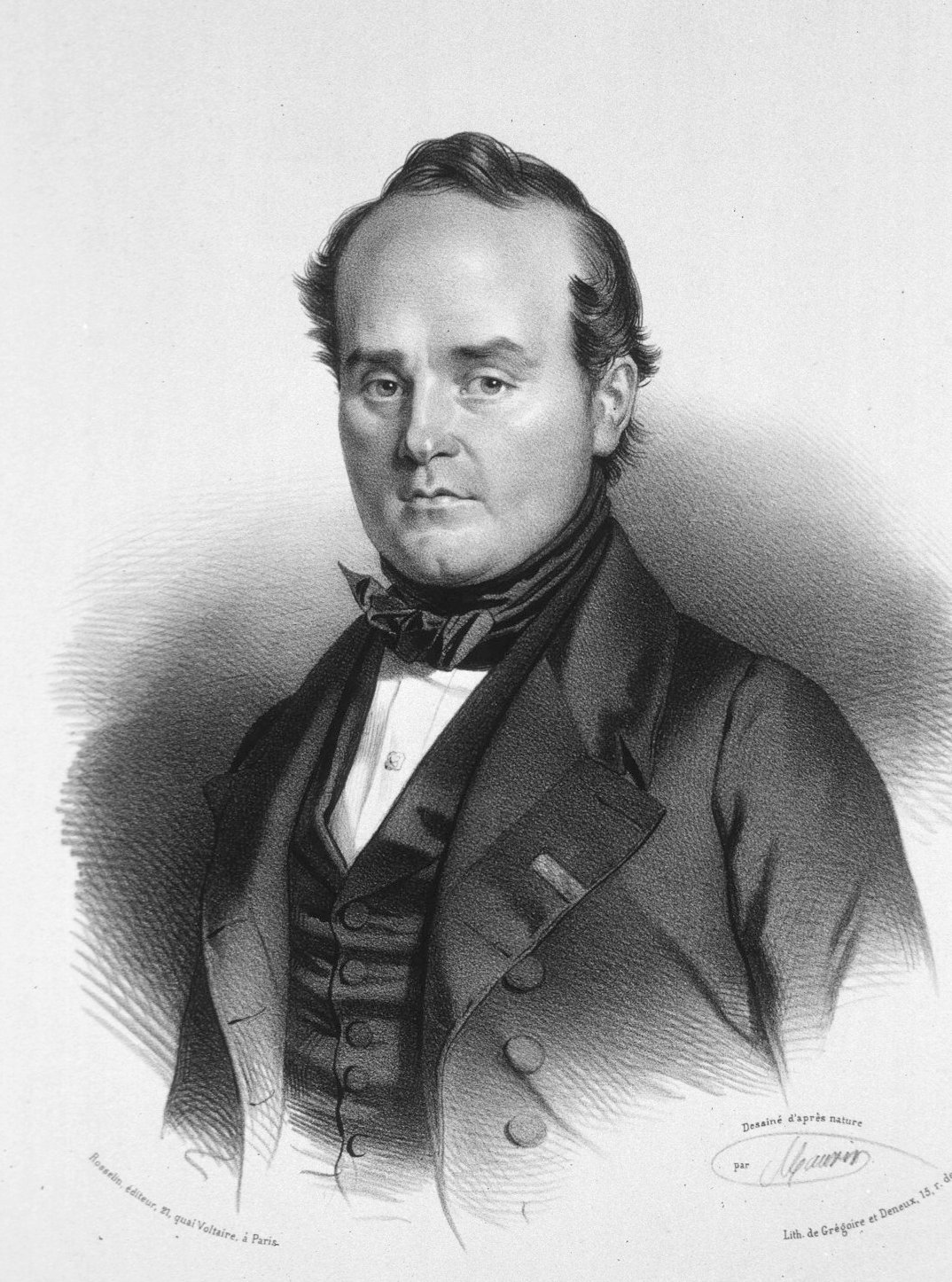
Jean-Baptiste Marc Bourgery

Jean-Baptiste Marc Bourgery (May 19, 1797 – June 1849) was a French medical doctor and anatomist who was a native of Orléans. Within 20 years, along with the artist Nicolas Henri Jacob, he created the comprehensive anatomy textbook Traité complet de l’anatomie de l’homme.

== Family ==
As a son of a haberdasher Marc Claude Bourgery and his wife Madeleine Marthe Delaboulaye, Bourgery grew up in Orléans.

== Education and work ==
Bourgery started his studies in medicine in 1813 in Paris. In 1815, he also attended lectures of the naturalist Jean-Baptiste Lamarck, a professor at the Museum of Natural History in Paris. After passing the entrance examination, Bourgery worked as a clinical intern for one year (1817) with René Laennec at the Hôpital Necker and two years (1818-1820) with Guillaume Dupuytren at the Hôtel Dieu.

Nonetheless, Bourgery did not complete his medical education due to financial issues. Instead, he worked for several years as a health officer (French: Officier de Santé) in a copper foundry in Romilly-sur-Seine (Aube), where he was actively involved in chemistry, chemical engineering and also participate in the establishment of a copper sulfate factory.

In 1827, Bourgery came back to Paris intending to entirely focus on anatomy. On August 27 of the same year, he submitted his dissertation and received his doctorate in medicine. In 1829, he published a textbook of surgery (French: Traité de petite chirurgie), which was quite successful and later was translated into English (1834) and German (1836) languages. During this time, Bourgery's role model and mentor was the anatomist and paleontologist Georges Cuvier.

From 1830, together with the painter and illustrator Nicolas Henri Jacob, Bourgery worked on the planning of his most important work Traité complet de l'anatomy de l'homme. It took nearly 20 years of teamwork to complete this masterpiece. From 1840 on, he had been writing scientific papers (often provided with lithographs), which were then published by the Academy of Sciences in Paris. In addition, Bourgery also took part in the production of anatomical models made of paper stucco or papier-mâché for the Félix Thibert Anatomy Museum.

Bourgery repeatedly sought career opportunities in the academy. He applied for a number of different positions, such as a professor at the Museum of Natural History, membership of the Paris Academy of Sciences (1843), or the chair of anatomy at the Faculty of Medicine in Paris (1846). Despite his expertise and high profile, Bourgery was unable to gain a foothold in the academic world. With a certain bitterness, he expresses this shortly before his death: "I watched how all the others were preferred over me, whether they wanted or not. Since I had so much to say about science and I had studied so intensely, I thought there had to be someplace for me there, but there wasn't. Academies, faculties, colleges – wherever I introduced myself, there were others who were much more successful than me." Jean-Marc Bourgery died at the age of 52 after completing his work, supposedly as a result of a cholera epidemics in Paris.

== Legacy ==
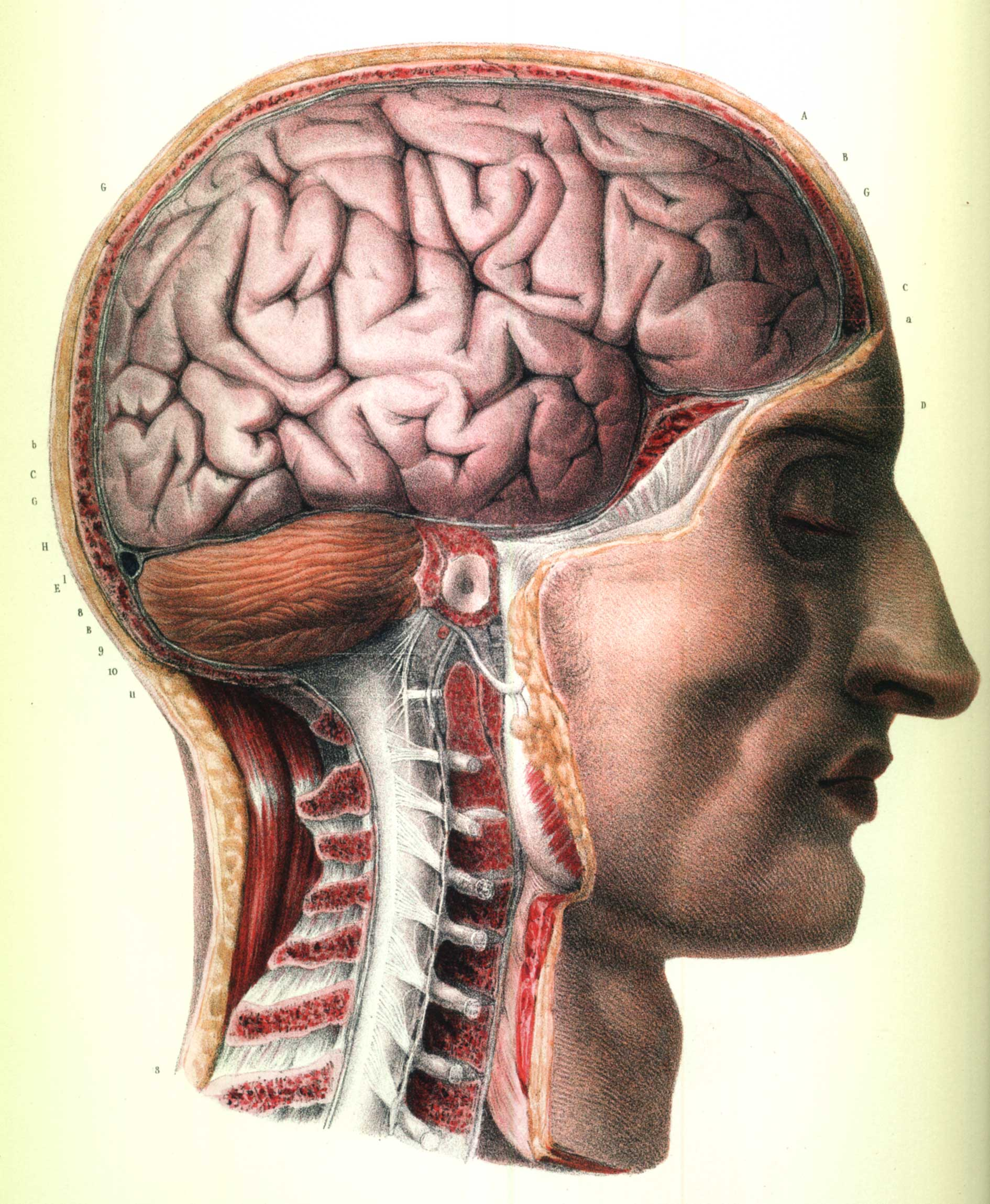
Cerebrum, cerebellum, brainstem and cervical cord

The anatomical treatise Traité complet de l'anatomie de l 'homme by Bourgery and Jacob (Paris 1831 to 1854), a large-format textbook and illustrated atlas, is considered a masterpiece of anatomical imaging, made both in black and white and in color (hand-colored). Bourgery was not limited in this ambitious project to the mere compilation of existing material. He supported his findings by autopsy and produced even original anatomical preparations. He dealt with aspects of morphology that had previously been neglected; he developed a number of new methods and research approaches, which he described systematically and in detail. Bourgery strived to be up-to-date. Thus, he received numerous first observations, especially in the fields of the nervous system anatomy, embryology, and organogenesis. Metaphysically, he saw himself as a traveller in search of a universal structure, the secret of which he hoped to unravel through persistent research of the supreme anatomical discipline– far more than just a comprehensive collection of morphological findings. Bourgery did extracurricular research and was occasionally supported by well-known scientists, such as Mathieu Orfila, François Magendie, Étienne Geoffroy Saint-Hilaire, and others.

=== Anatomy ===
The Complete Treatise on the Human Anatomy (French: Traité complet de l’anatomie de l’homme) is an atlas of anatomy published from 1831 to 1854 in Paris by J.M. Bourgery and N.H. Jacob comprises eight volumes with 2108 pages of text containing 725 panels with 3750 individual images. The first five volumes are dedicated to descriptive anatomy, two volumes deal with surgical anatomy and theory, and the last volume focuses on the general anatomy and philosophy of anatomy. These eight volumes are written in encyclopedic manner and do not refer to the footage. Each volume of text is assigned with an illustrated volume with lithographed picture panels and accompanying text.

Publication	Subject	Size
Volume 1, 1831–1832	Osteology, Arthrology	188 pages of text, 59 panels (402 illustrations)
Volume 2, 1834	Myology (muscles, tendons, fascia)	138 pages of text, 100 panels (219 illustrations)
Volume 3, 1844	Neuroanatomy	326 pages of text, 114 panels (368 illustrations)
Volume 4, 1835–1836	Angiology	158 pages of text, 98 panels (269 illustrations)
Volume 5, 1839	Splanchnology	336 pages of text, 96 panels (249 illustrations)
Volume 6 and 7, Supplement, 1839–1840	Surgical anatomy, surgical theory	627 pages of text, 191 panels (1585 images)
Volume 8, 1854	General and Philosophical Anatomy	336 pages of text, 67 panels (658 illustrations)

== Autopsies ==
Bourgery was assisted by medical staff and surgeons during autopsies and preparations of original anatomical samples needed as templates for drawings. His most important collaborator was Ludwig Moritz Hirschfeld (1816-1876). Claude Bernard also provided contributions and also appeared as editor of the second edition.

== Illustration ==
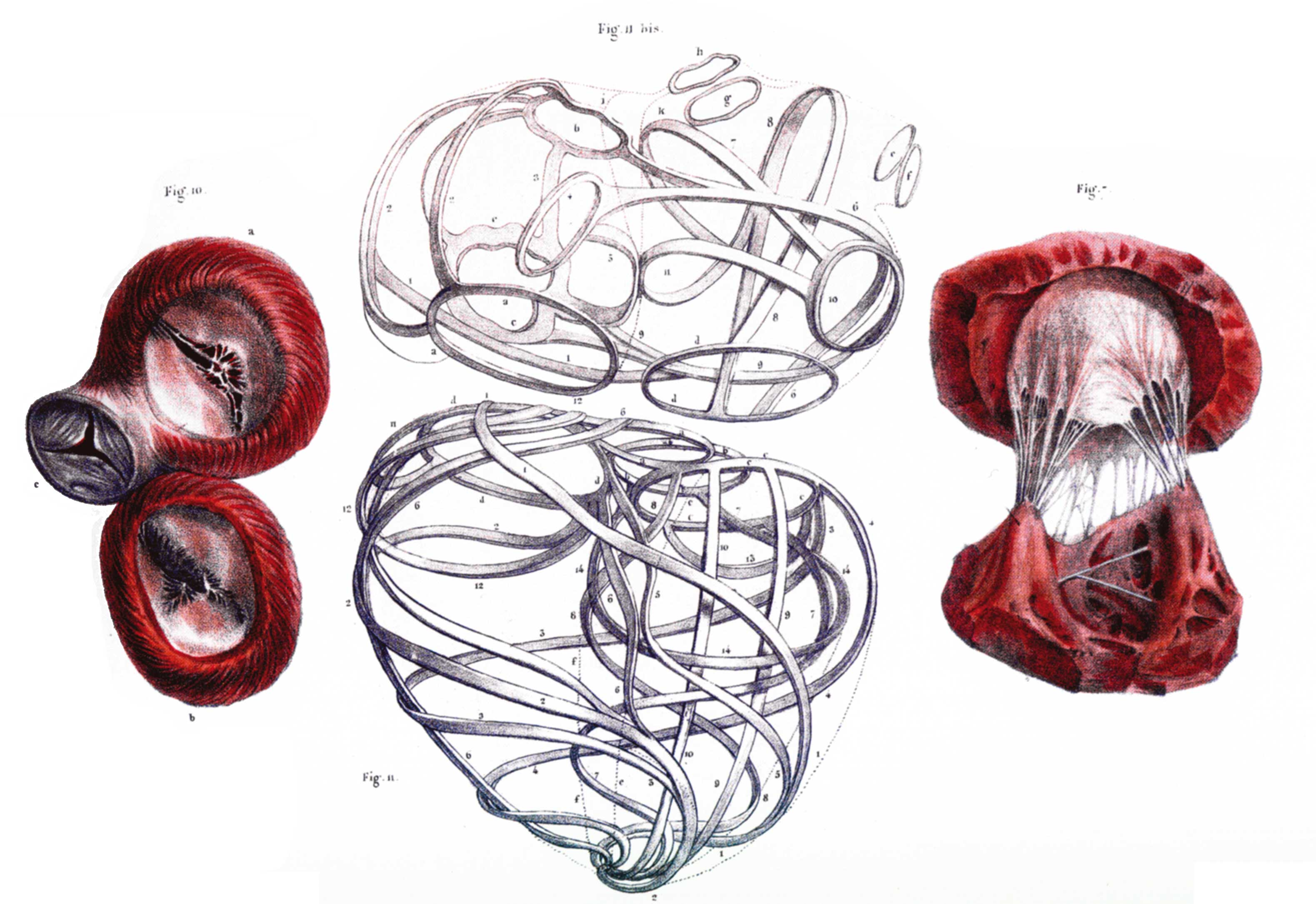
Heart valves and fibrous connective tissue of the heart

Bourgery paid great attention to the quality of the illustrations because they were meant to be "drawn to nature". Nicolas Henri Jacob was already established and later honored as a draftsman; he mastered lithographic techniques and also knew the subject of medical science quite well. He drew and lithographed 512 of 725 plates and 2196 illustrations out of 3750. There have been also other students and artists who collaborated with him, among which are Charlotte A. Hublier, Jean Baptiste Léveillé, Edmond Pochet, and others. The natural appearance and coloring, the deliberately used ideal-typical model organism, should increase the usefulness of imaging. All panels that had been made with lithography were invented by Alois Senefelder. The procedure allowed a much more accurate drawing and gave a better haptic impression of the anatomical structures than in woodcut or copper engraving possible. Initially, the lithograph produced only black-and-white images with gray gradation, which were then colored with a brush or stencils by hand. Only the second edition was printed in color with the lithograph in colors.

== Reception ==
The first edition was published by C. A. Delaunay in Paris. Subscribers received from 1831 to 1840 a total of 70 deliveries, each composed of eight panels and eight sheets accompanying the text. At that time, a black-and-white copy cost about 800 francs and a colored copy 1600 francs. The high price obviously was an obstacle for the spread of the work.

From 1833 to 1837 a partial edition in English was released followed by a second edition in 1866-1871. The monumental work of Bourgery and Jacob received an award and the highest praise from critics and experts. Although this work was "designed as an iconography of the human anatomy", it was almost forgotten around 1900.

Illustrations from Bourgery's atlas of anatomy became a compulsory component of the popular science bestseller by Fritz Kahn in 1920s and 1967-1979 in Germany, as well as from 1943 in the US. Increasingly, modern anatomical publications referred to works of Bourgery. In 2005, a facsimile reprint of the entire atlas of anatomy (i.e., all eight illustrated volumes) was published in a volume with updated anatomical nomenclature.

== Awards ==
- Around 1820, Bourgery was awarded a prize of the Paris medical faculty and a gold medal from the hospital administration for his work as an assistant doctor.
- Prix Monthyon 1843 (with Jacob)
- Knight's Cross of the Legion of Honor

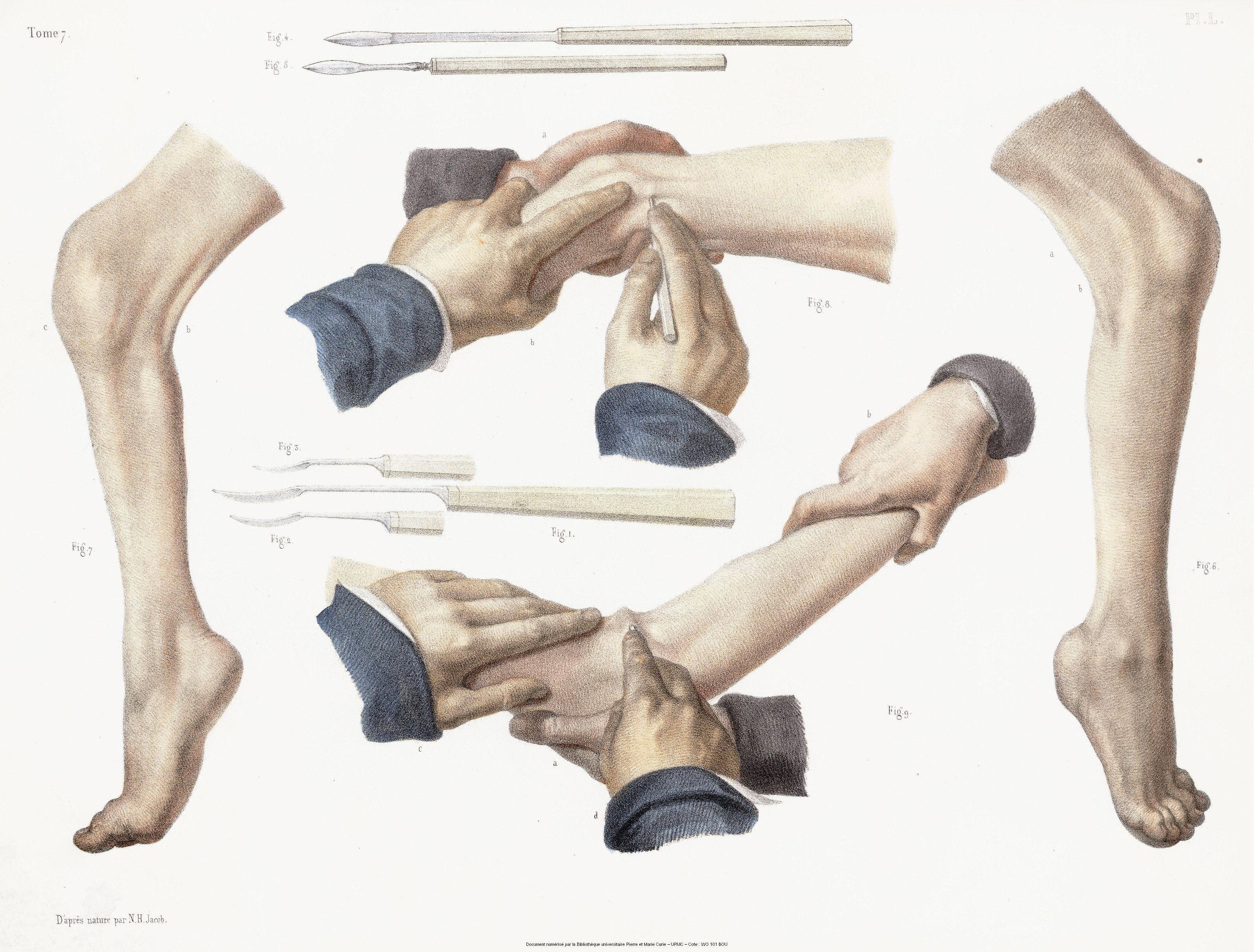
Tendon dissection for the treatment of a thigh contracture

== Quotes ==
"Because the technology of lithography today makes it possible to publish a substantial number of illustrated works without incurring too high costs, physicians would greatly benefit if they were given all the work involved in anatomy. However, to extract the most significant benefit from this kind of work, the medical expertise presented therein must not only be up-to-date but also presented in all its areas of application. ... First of all, the newly designed illustrations of such a work must be drawn from nature, but refer to the previously published and widely known illustrations. It is a challenge that Monsieur Jacob and I set ourselves. We will spare no effort to bring our immense work to an honorable conclusion". Vol. 1, p. 1-2

“As de Maistre said, there is a mystery at the beginning of all sciences. To complete the sentence of this great thinker, one should say: At the beginning and the end of all sciences is a mystery, or even moreover: science is nothing but a mystery... A seemingly obvious idea is only a glimmer of light between two abysses ...” Vol. 3, p. 33

“Now that I'm about to finish my life's work, the entire material of which is at my disposal, and since what I've come close to what I set out to do, the public may realize that I did not fail with my intention.” Vol. 8, p. 3

== Works ==
- Traité de petite chirurgie. Paris 1829
- Traité complet de l'anatomie de l'homme: comprenant la médicine opératoire. (with Jean Marc Bourgery), 8 Bände, Paris 1831–1854
- Reprint: Jean-Marie Le Minor, Henri Sick (ed.): Atlas of Anatomy. Taschen-Verlag, Köln 2005, ISBN 978-3-8228-3129-8.
- Traité de petite chirurgie. Paris 1829
- Anatomie élémentaire en 20 planches etc. Avec texte explicative, formant un manuel complet d’anatomie physiologique (with Nicolas Henri Jacob). Paris 1834–1842, Folio
- Des annexes du foetus et de leur développement. Habil., Paris 1846
- (scientific contributions). Comptes rendus de l’Académie des sciences (1836–1848), Gazette médicale de Paris (1847–1848)
- Traité complet de l'anatomie de l'homme (with Jean Marc Bourgery, Claude Bernard and with a help of Ludovic Hirschfeld), 10 Volumes, second edition, Paris 1866–1871

== Literature ==
- J. M. Bourgery, N. H. Jacob: Atlas of Human Anatomy and Surgery. The complete colored Plates of 1831–1854. Jean-Marie Le Minor, Henri Sick: Atlas der Anatomie und Chirurgie von J. M. Bourgery und N. H. Jacob. Ein Monumentalwerk des 19. Jahrhunderts. Dreisprachig (f/e/d), Faksimile-Reprint 726 handkolorierte Lithografien, Großformat. Taschen, Köln 2005, ISBN 978-2286012687
- Natalie J. Lauer: Der Kontrakt des Zeichners mit der Medizin. Ästhetik und Wissenschaft im Bildatlas Bourgery & Jacob. Königshausen & Neumann, Würzburg 2013, ISBN 978-3-8260-5045-9
- Reinhard Hildebrand: Bourgery und Jacob, Hirschfeld und Léveillé – über Meisterwerke der anatomischen Ikonographie zur Blütezeit der Lithographie. In: Anatomischer Anzeiger Jena 158 (1985) 363–372
- August Hirsch (Hrsg.): Biographisches Lexikon der hervorragenden Ärzte aller Zeiten und Völker. Bd. 1, München 1962, S. 657
- M. Prevost, Roman d’Amat (eds.): Dictionnaire de Biographie française. Bd. 31, Paris 1951, S. 1481
- Archives Biographique Français 76, 78

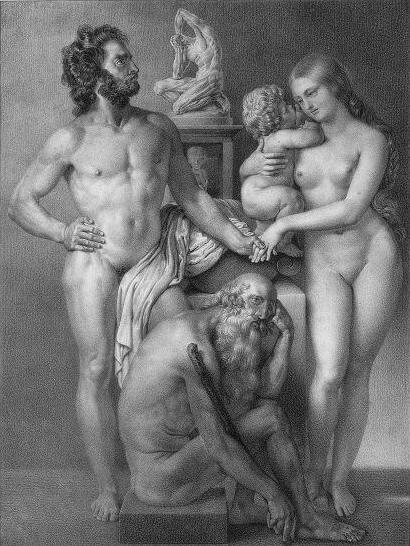
Frontispiece of "Traité complet de l'anatomie humaine" (1832-1851)
