= Alfonso Calderon =

Alfonso Calderón may refer to:

- Alfonso Calderon (activist) (born 2001), American activist against gun violence
- Alfonso Calderón (poet) (1930–2009), Chilean poet

== See also ==
- Calderón
