= Batopilas Municipality =

Municipality in the Mexican state of Chihuahua

Batopilas
- Municipality
- Municipality of Batopilas in Chihuahua

- Location in Chihuahua Location in Mexico
- Coordinates: 27°2′N 107°44′W
- Country: Mexico
- State: Chihuahua
- Municipal seat: Batopilas

Area
  - Total: 2,064.6 km^{2} (797.1 sq mi)

Population (2010)
  - Total: 14,362

Batopilas de Manuel Gómez Morín (Spanish: [batoˈpilas]) is one of the 67 municipalities of Chihuahua, in northern Mexico. The municipal seat lies at Batopilas. The municipality covers an area of 2,064.6 km^{2}.

The name "Batopilas de Manuel Gómez Morín" was adopted in 2017 to honor of Manuel Gómez Morín (1897-1972), who was born here and was a prominent Mexican lawyer, academician and politician.

As of 2010, the municipality had a total population of 14,362, up from 13,298 as of 2005.

As of 2010, the town of Batopilas had a population of 1,220. Other than the town of Batopilas, the municipality had 603 localities, none of which had a population over 1,000.

== Geography ==
=== Towns and villages ===
Name	Population (2005)
Batopilas	1,210
Yoquivo	678
Mineral Polanco	525
Total Municipality	13,268
