= Manuel Gómez Morín =

Mexican politician (1897–1972)

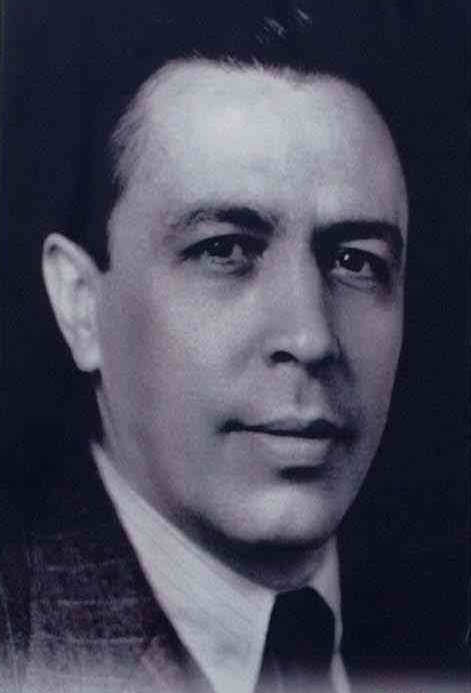

President of the National Action Party
- In office 1939–1949
- Preceded by: Party founded
- Succeeded by: Juan Gutiérrez Lascurain

Rector of the National Autonomous University of Mexico
- In office 23 October 1933 – 26 October 1934
- Preceded by: Roberto Medellín Ostos
- Succeeded by: Enrique O. Aragón

Personal details
- Born: 27 February 1897 Batopilas, Mexico
- Died: 19 April 1972 (aged 75) Mexico City, Mexico
- Resting place: Panteón de Dolores
- Party: National Action Party
- Spouse: Lidia Torres Fuentes (m. 1924)
- Children: 4
- Education: National University of Mexico

Manuel Gómez Morín (27 February 1897 – 19 April 1972) was a Mexican politician. He was a founding member of the National Action Party, and one of its theoreticians. Prior to this he was considered a leading figure in Mexican monetary policy, one of the so-called Siete Sabios de México (Seven Sages of Mexico).

== Early life ==
Gómez Morín was born in the old mining town of Batopilas in the state of Chihuahua on 27 February 1897. His father Manuel Gómez Castillo (of Spanish origin) died at age 24, shortly after his son was born. His mother, Concepción Morín de Avellano, was a native of Parral, Chihuahua.

His widowed mother sold their small home and moved to Parral around 1911, from there they moved to the city of Chihuahua. Later, looking for a better place for her son, she moved to León, Guanajuato, there, in a Sacred Heart school, Manuel finished his primary school studies. His first years of preparatory school in the María Inmaculada school, founded by the bishop of León, Don Emeterio Valverde y Téllez.

By 1913, mother and child left León and moved to Mexico City where Manuel entered the Escuela Nacional Preparatoria and finished high school.

From 1915 to 1919 he worked from correcting tests to writing editorials in revolutionary papers to help his family. He worked in the Secretaría de Hacienda from 1919 to 1921.

He married Lidia Torres Fuentes in 1924, with whom he had four children: Juan Manuel, Gabriela, Mauricio and Margarita.

He died on 19 April 1972, in Mexico City. He rests in Mexico City's Rotonda de los Personajes Ilustres.

== Professional studies ==
Gómez Morín studied Law during the days of the Mexican Revolution in the National University of Mexico (UNAM), and there, as a student, he struggled to gain autonomy for the university of which he served as rector in 1933. He received a degree of law in 1918, and at age 21, he taught Political Law and Constitutional Law at the university. In 1934 he received a Honoris Causa doctorate from the UNAM.

== Professional career ==
He began practicing his career as a lawyer two years before graduating, and after he graduated he started his own office which he carried out in the same building until his death. With the exception of a few years he laboured in the Secretary of Finance and as rector of the UNAM, he always lived as a lawyer and in 1927 he was legal representative to the Soviet Embassy.

== Civil Service career ==
As a public servant, he occupied the post of Under-secretary of Finance, President of the Board of the Banco de México, member of the organizing commission of Banobras and collaborated in the first Commission on Studies about Social Security.

He worked in the Board of the Banco de México from 1925 to 1929. He created the First Law on Agricultural Credit. He had an important role in the creation of the Constitutive Law of the Bank of Mexico, Insurance institutions and organic laws of articles 27 and 28 of the Mexican Constitution.

== Politics ==
=== Founding of the National Action Party ===
On September 15, 1939, Gómez Morín founded the National Action Party of Mexico along with Roberto Cossío y Cosío, Juan Landerreche Obregón, Daniel Kuri Breña, Juan José Páramo Castro, Bernardo Ponce, Francisco Fernández Cueto, Carlos Ramírez Zetina and Enrique Manuel Loaeza Garay. Served as the first party president from 1939 to 1949. The National Action Party won the presidential elections for the first time in the year 2000, 61 years after its founding.

=== "National Action" politics ===
The National Action Party was built on a theory of National Action politics, rejecting a fundamental adherence to right or left, which was developed by Gomez Morin and his associates as having political Pragmatism requiring the adoption policies that correspond to the problems faced by the nation at any given moment.

The party ideology, at least in principle, is that of "National Action" which rejects a fundamental adherence to left- or right-wing politics or policies, instead requiring the adoption of such policies as correspond to the current problems faced by the nation in the present. According to Manuel Gómez Morín both right and left wing policies may be considered equally carefully in formulation of national policy. (This is a similar theoretical basis as Gaullism).

Since its inception, the party has always welcomed ideologues with a strongly Catholic background, as they have been unable to find expression in other parties. This has moved the PAN's overall position on most social issues into Christian Democracy.

=== Belisario Domínguez Medal of Honor ===
The Senate of the Republic awarded Gómez Morín the Belisario Domínguez Medal of Honor, the nation's highest honor, in a post mortem ceremony on November 6, 2013. The medal was received by his daughter, Margarita Gómez Morín.

== See also ==
- Manuel Clouthier
- Los Siete Sabios de México

Preceded by Party founded	President of the National Action Party; 1939–1949	Succeeded by Juan Gutiérrez Lascurain
