= Los Siete Sabios de México =

Los Siete Sabios de México ("The Seven Sages of Mexico") is a 1950 work of biography by Mexican writer and politician Luis Calderón Vega.

The "Seven Sages" were the founding members of Mexico City's "Society for Conferences and Concerts" (Sociedad de Conferencias y Conciertos), which was founded in 1916 to promote greater cultural awareness among university students. These individuals were also known as the "Generation of 1915". Despite using it as his title, Calderón did not coin the term "Seven Sages" in reference to them: it was first applied to them during their university days. It was a reference to the Seven Sages of Greece of antiquity.

In his book, Calderón Vega provides biographies of the following figures:

- Alfonso Caso, archaeologist, jurist, and rector of the National Autonomous University of Mexico.
- Antonio Castro Leal, expert in English and Mexican literature, rector of the National Autonomous University of Mexico.
- Manuel Gómez Morín, founder of the National Action Party (PAN), and rector of the National Autonomous University of Mexico.
- Vicente Lombardo Toledano, one of the country's foremost labor leaders.
- Jesús Moreno Baca, jurist.
- Alberto Vázquez del Mercado, Supreme Court Justice.
- Teófilo Olea y Leyva, Supreme Court Justice.
