= Alfonso Caso =

Mexican archaeologist (1896–1970)

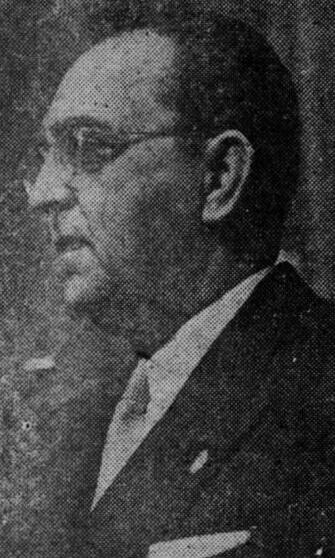
- Caso in 1946
- Born: 1 February 1896; Mexico City, Mexico
- Died: 30 November 1970 (aged 74); Exuma, Bahamas
- Scientific career
- Institutions: National Autonomous University of Mexico; Instituto Nacional de Antropología e Historia

Alfonso Caso y Andrade (1 February 1896 – 30 November 1970) was an archaeologist who made important contributions to pre-Columbian studies in his native Mexico.

As a university student, he was part of a group of young intellectuals known as Los Siete Sabios de México ("The Seven Sages of Mexico") who founded Mexico City's "Society for Conferences and Concerts", which promoted cultural activity among the student population. One of the other Sages was Vicente Lombardo Toledano, who became Caso's brother-in-law after he married Lombardo's sister, writer María Lombardo: the couple had four children. After her death in 1966, he married her sister Aida.

Caso completed a law degree in 1919 and immediately started teaching at the National Autonomous University of Mexico. The systematic legal training he received would mark his archaeological and administrative work throughout his life. While a young lawyer, Caso visited the then-remote hilltop ceremonial center of Xochicalco in Mexico's state of Morelos. The art and architecture of Xochicalco fascinated him and turned his mind to the archaeological study of pre-Hispanic Mexico. While he continued to work in illegal projects associated with commercial institutions, he began a program of study at Mexico's Museo Nacional. There, he took classes in pre-Hispanic history, ethnology, and archaeology with influential teachers as Eduard Seler, Hermann Beyer, and Manuel Gamio, with whom he often debated, posing alternative interpretations. At the age of twenty-nine, he obtained a master's degree in philosophy (with a specialty in archaeology) from the Escuela de Altos Estudios. After that, he dedicated himself to the study of pre-Hispanic cultures and contemporary Indigenous peoples. His rigorous methods of interpretation were evident in his first essay on patolli and other pre-Hispanic games, and it was clear to his colleagues and teachers that a powerful new professional voice had arrived.

Throughout his work, he sought to explain the development of Mesoamerican civilisations in terms of continuity and internal evolution, rejecting earlier theories about cultural change being the result of trans-cultural diffusion. His approach was interdisciplinary, drawing on linguistics, ethnography, history and demography.

His notable discoveries include the excavations at Monte Albán, in particular "Tomb Seven", in which several gold pieces and offerings were found (now shown in the Regional Museum of Oaxaca). He also discovered many sites in the Mixteca (a region in the state of Oaxaca), such as Yucuita, Yucuñudahui and Monte Negro. As well as discovering new sites Caso also sought to interpret them, establishing the chronology of Monte Albán history, and deciphering Mixtec codices.

Throughout his life Caso wrote books about native Mesoamerican cultures, including those of the Olmec, Mixtec, Zapotec, and Aztec. He was one of the first to recognize the Olmecs as the earliest Mesoamerican civilization, declaring that they were the "cultura madre" (Mother culture) of Mesoamerica. His argument has subsequently been debated by Mesoamerican archaeologists; it is currently unclear how the Olmec interacted with other Mesoamerican cultures. His writing on the Zapotecs, based on his work at Monte Albán, proposed that they established hegemony over neighbouring peoples - a theory which was widely criticised at the time, but which was validated by the studies of others after Caso's death.

He was the younger brother of philosopher Antonio Caso Andrade.

== Academic life ==
Caso served as the first Director of the Instituto Nacional de Antropología e Historia, Director of the National School of Anthropology and History, and Rector of the National Autonomous University of Mexico.

"Organic University law" in which he established the autonomy of the UNAM. He also played the role of Secretary of National Goods and Administrative Examination (Spanish: Secretario de Bienes Nacionales e Inspección Administrativa) from December 10, 1946 to December 31, 1948.

He was a member of the United States National Academy of Sciences, the American Academy of Arts and Sciences, and the American Philosophical Society.

== Selected works ==
- El teocallí de La Guerra Sagrada (monograph) (1927)
- Las estelas zapotecas (1928)
- La religión de los aztecas (1936)
- Las exploraciones de Monte Albán, (3 volumes, 1931–1937)
- Calendario y escritura de tas Antiguas culturas de Monte Albán (1947)
- El mapa de Teozacoa1co (1949)
- El pueblo del Sol (1953)
- Interpretación del Códice Gómez de Orozco (1954),
- Urnas de Oaxaca (1956)
- Los calendarios prehíspánicos (1967)
- El tesoro de Monte Albán (1969)
- Reyes y reinos de la Mixteca (2 volumes, 1977–1979).

Alfonso Caso y Andrade

== See also ==
- Beatriz Caso
