= Jordi Amat =

Jordi Amat may refer to:

- Jordi Amat (footballer) (born 1992), Spanish and Indonesian footballer
- Jordi Amat (author) (born 1978), Spanish essayist and editor
