= Luis Calderón Vega =

Mexican politician (1911–1989)

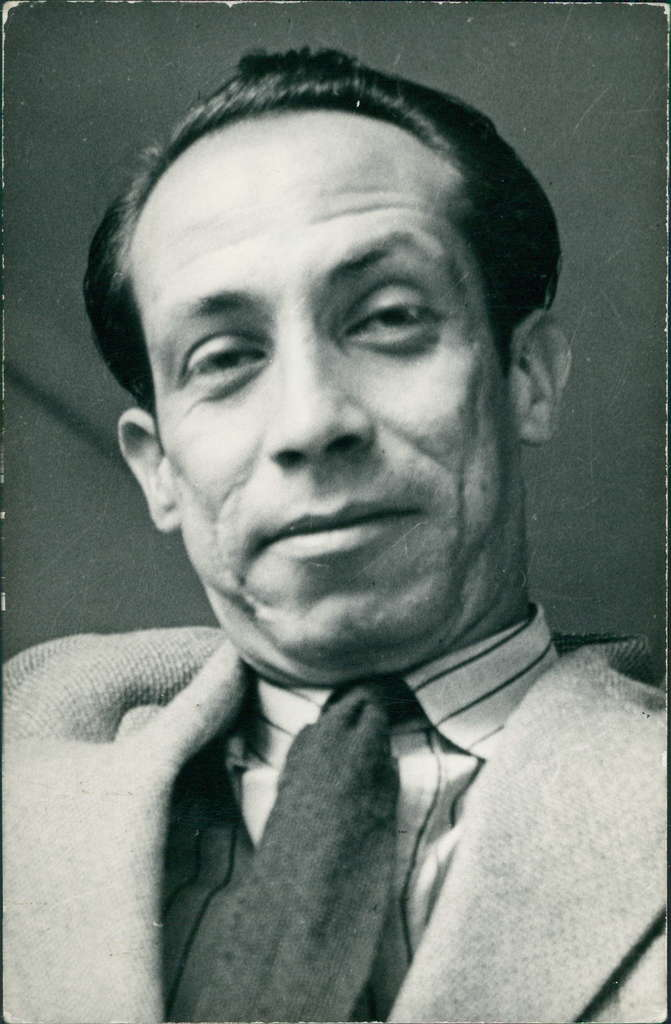
Luis Calderón

Luis Calderón Vega (1911–1989) was a Mexican politician and writer. Along with other leading opposition politicians, he was one of the founders of the National Action Party (PAN) in 1939.

Calderón Vega, who married María del Carmen Hinojosa González, was a prominent politician in his native Michoacán. He also authored several books, including the seminal political overview of the so-called "1915 Generation", Los Siete Sabios de México. He served in the lower house of Congress, before resigning from the PAN in 1981, believing the party had abandoned the progressive ideals he favoured to become a right-wing party that served only the interests of the rich.

He was a professor at the Valladolid Institute. Pioneers in this institution were professors Javier Ibarrola, J. Praxedis Alfaro, Porfirio Martínez Peñalosa, Dr. Borja León Márquez, Manuel Martín del Campo, Lic. Rafael Morelos Zapien, Gabriel Bobadilla, Raúl Zepeda Medina, Melesio de Jesús Vargas, Luis Bravo, Eugenio Romero, Miguel Hernández, Fernando Calderón, Jorge Camacho, Felio Mirabent, Alfonso Rubio, Fr. Jorge Godsseels, Fr. José Villalón Mercado and Fr. Manuel Castro Ruiz.

He was the father of Felipe Calderón, who was elected president in the 2006 presidential elections.

== See also ==
- Calderón Hinojosa family
