= Calderón Hinojosa family =

Mexican political family

The Calderón Hinojosa family is a Mexican political family from the state of Michoacán whose members have included one Mexican President and various notable right-wing politicians.

== Notable members ==
- Luis Calderón Vega, a writer and founder of the National Action Party (PAN).
  - Felipe Calderón Hinojosa, President of Mexico 2006-2012 (PAN), son of Calderón Vega.
  - Margarita Zavala de Calderón, former PAN deputy, wife of Calderón Hinojosa.
  - Luisa María Calderón Hinojosa, former PAN senator, daughter of Calderón Vega.
