= Antonio Castro Leal =

Mexican politician

10th Rector of the National Autonomous University of Mexico
- In office 1 December 1928 – 21 June 1929
- Preceded by: Alfonso Pruneda
- Succeeded by: Ignacio García Téllez

Director of the Department of Fine Arts of Mexico
- In office 1934–1934

3rd Mexican Representative to UNESCO
- In office 1950–1954
- Preceded by: Manuel Martínez Báez
- Succeeded by: Pedro de Alba

Member of the Chamber of Deputies of Mexico
- In office 1958–1961
- Constituency: 8th district, Mexico City

Personal details
- Born: March 2, 1896 San Luis Potosí, San Luis Potosí, Mexico
- Died: January 7, 1981 (aged 84) Coyoacán, Mexico City, Mexico
- Party: PRI
- Education: UNAM, Georgetown University
- Occupation: Writer, Politician

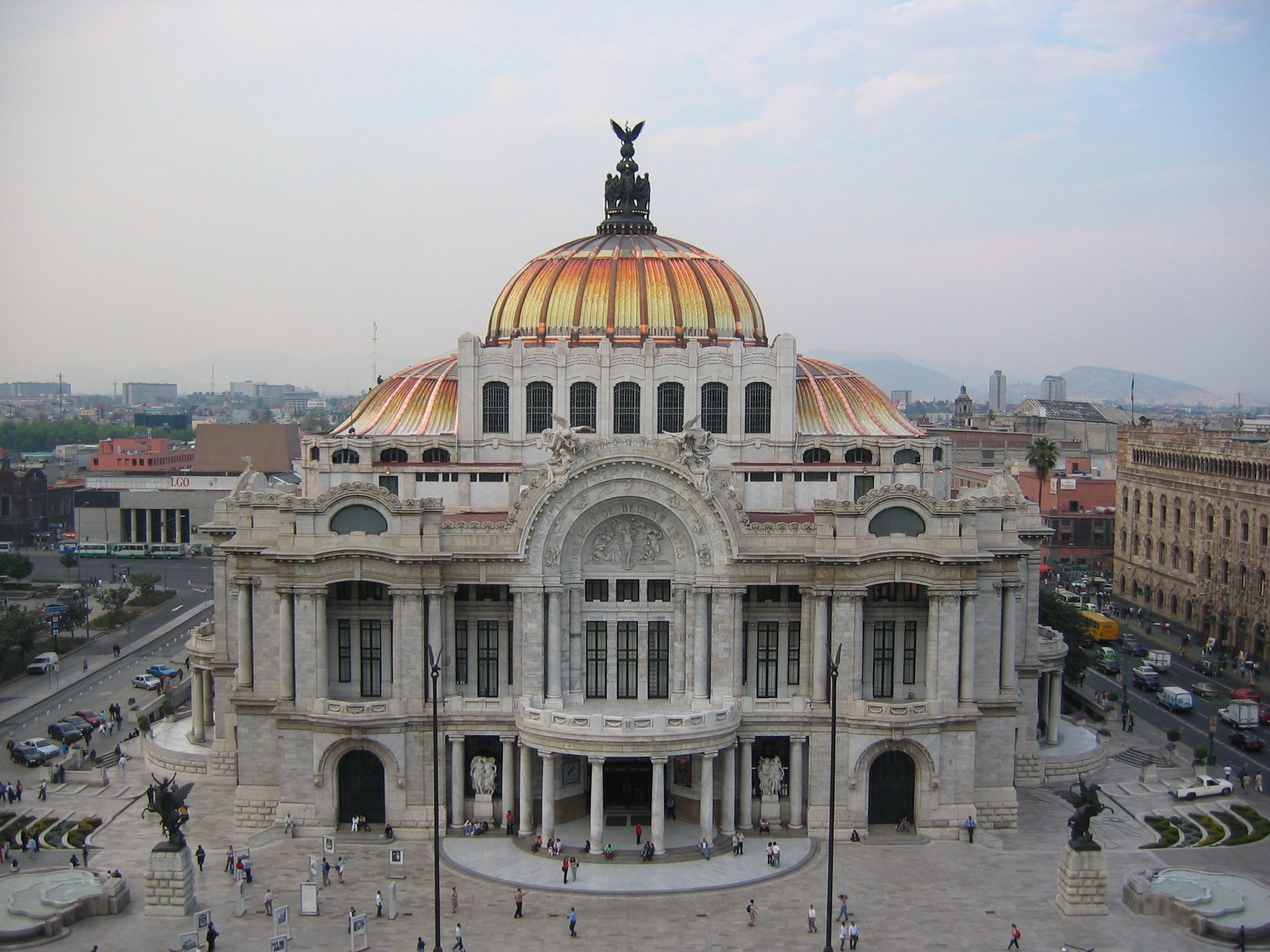
Palacio de Bellas Artes

Antonio Castro Leal (March 2, 1896 – January 7, 1981) was a Mexican diplomat and intellectual.

== Biography ==
Antonio Castro Leal was born on March 2, 1896, in San Luis Potosí. He received his licenciate and doctor of law degrees from the National Autonomous University of Mexico and his PhD from Georgetown University in Washington, D.C. Castro Leal was rector of UNAM in 1929 during the student strikes that ultimately lead to the university becoming autonomous, after which he resigned his post. In 1934 as Director of the Department of Fine Arts he inaugurated the Palacio de Bellas Artes in Mexico City. He lived in Paris from 1949 to 1954 as Mexico's ambassador and executive board member for UNESCO, after which he moved to Coyoacán, in Mexico City, where he lived for the rest of his life. He died on January 7, 1981.

== Main posts held ==
(This is an incomplete list.)

- Rector of the National Autonomous University of Mexico (UNAM),1928–29
- Director of the Department of Fine Arts, 1934
- Mexican ambassador to UNESCO, 1949–52
- Member of UNESCO's executive board, 1950–54
- Member of the Chamber of Deputies, 1958–61 (for the Federal District's eighteenth district)

== Works ==
(This is an incomplete list.)

- Las cien mejores poesías liricas mexicanas (ed. with Manuel Toussaint and Alberto Vázquez del Mercado) (1914)
- The Church Problem in Mexico (pamphlet) (1926)
- Las cien mejores poesias mexicanas (ed.) (1935)
- Juan Ruiz de Alarcón. Ingenio y sabiduría (1939)
- Twenty Centuries of Mexican Art - (introd.) (1940)
- Revista de literatura mexicana (1940–1941)
- El libro de oro del cine mexicano (The Golden Book of Mexican Cinematography) (coord.) (1948) (Comisión Nacional de Cinematografía, México, D.F.)
- Las dos partes del Quijote (1949)
- La poesía mexicana moderna (1953)
- Una historia del siglo XX (1955)
- Las ideas de Salvador Díaz Mirón (1956)
- La novela de la Revolución Mexicana (1958–1960)
- El laurel de San Lorenzo (1959)
- Un mensaje a la América Latina y una elegía por España (poem) (1960)
- Alejandro de Humboldt y el arte prehispánico (1962)
- El Primer Congreso Internacional de Americanistas (1963)
- El pensamiento musical de Carlos Chávez (1963)
- La novela del México colonial (1964)
- Luis G. Urbina (1964)
- Las tragedias de Shakespeare (1965)
- Thoreau y su discípulo Cassius Clay (1967)
- ¿A dónde va México? Reflexiones sobre nuestra historia contemporánea (1968)
- Hombres e ideas de nuestro tiempo (1969)
- Díaz Mirón, su vida y su obra (1970)
- El español, instrumento de una cultura (1970)
- La poesía de Manuel José Othón (1971)
- El imperialismo andaluz y otras historias (1984)

=== As a translator ===
Castro Leal also translated Maurice Dobb's Introduction to Economics for Mexico's Fondo de Cultura Económica.

== See also ==
- Los Siete Sabios de México (The Seven Mexican Sages)
