= Altagracia (disambiguation) =

Altagracia is a city in Nicaragua.

Altagracia may also refer to:

== Settlements ==
- La Altagracia, a province in the Dominican Republic
- Los Puertos de Altagracia, a city in Zulia, Venezuela
- Altagracia de Orituco, a city in Guárico, Venezuela
- Altagracia (Cedeño), a civil parish of Cedeño Municipality, Bolívar, Venezuela
- Altagracia (Torres), a civil parish of Torres Municipality, Lara, Venezuela
- Altagracia (Sucre), a civil parish of Sucre Municipality, Sucre, Venezuela
- Altagracia (Caracas), a civil parish of the Libertador Bolivarian Municipality, Caracas, Venezuela
- Altagracia de La Montaña, a civil parish of the municipality Guaicaipuro, Miranda, Venezuela

== Other ==
- Altagracia (given name)
- Basílica Catedral Nuestra Señora de la Altagracia, a basilica in the Dominican Republic
- Our Lady of Altagracia, a patron saint of the Dominican Republic, venerated in Higüey
- La Mujer de Judas, a Venezuelan TV series known as Altagracia

== See also ==
- Alta Gracia, a city in Argentina
