= Jordi Amat (author) =

Spanish philologist and writer (born 1978)

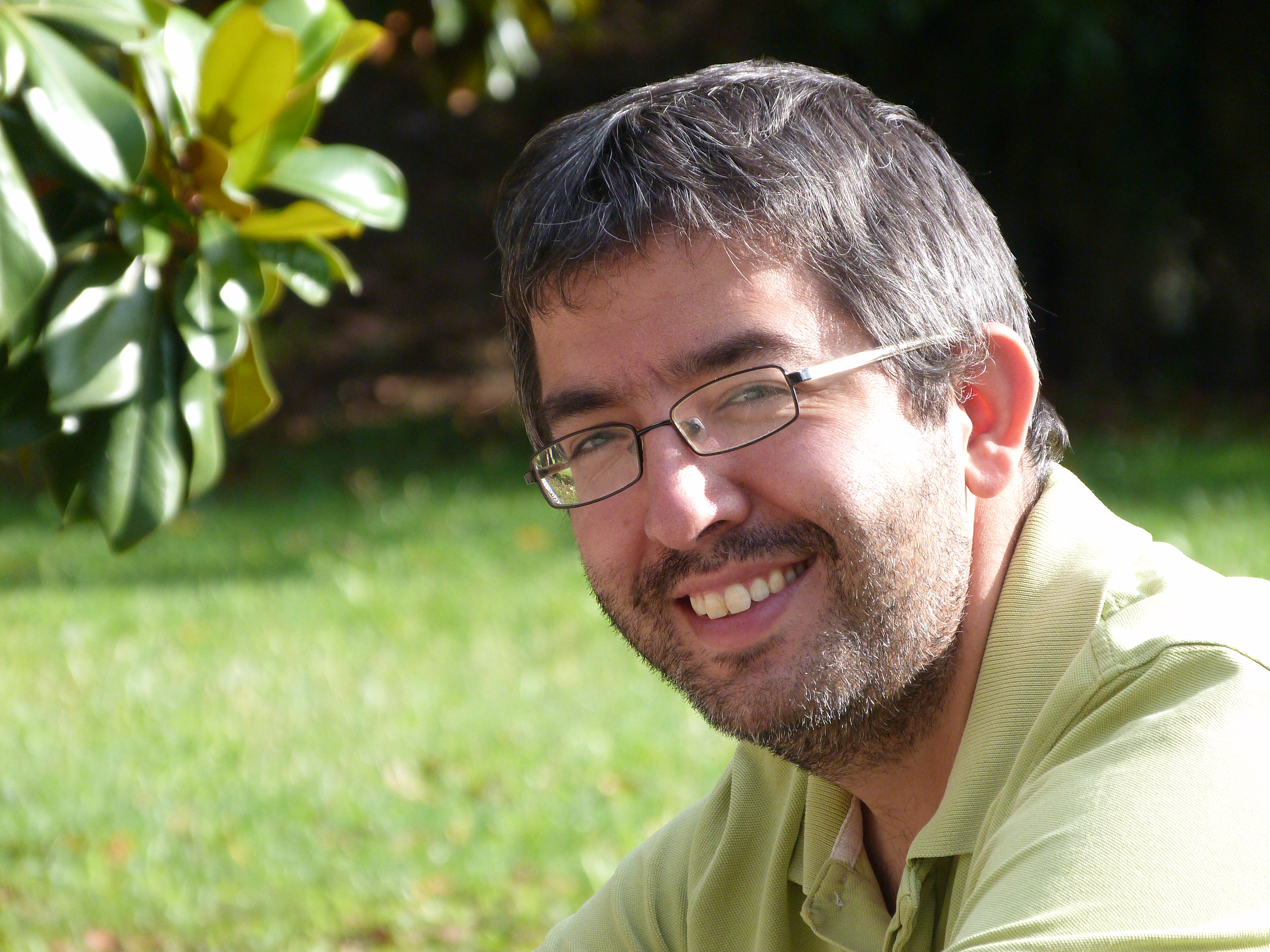
Amat in 2014

Jordi Amat Fusté (born 1978, Barcelona) is a Spanish essayist, philologist, editor and cultural critic, expert in the 20th-century intellectual history of Catalonia and the rest of Spain. He writes in both the Catalan and Spanish languages.

== Works ==
Author

- Luis Cernuda. Fuerza de soledad i Las voces del diálogo. Madrid: Espasa-Calpe, 2002.
- Las voces del diálogo. Poesía y política en el medio siglo. Barcelona: Península, 2007 (Premi d'Assaig Casa de América). ISBN 8483077647.
- Dionisio Ridruejo: Casi unas memorias. Edició de Jordi Amat. Barcelona: Península, 2012.
- Roc Boronat, el republicà que va fundar el Sindicat de Cecs. Amb Betsabé Garcia. Barcelona: Pòrtic, 2008. ISBN 8498090385.
- Els Coloquios Cataluña-Castilla (1964-1971). Debat sobre el model territorial de l'Espanya democràtica. Barcelona: PAM, 2010.
- Els laberints de la llibertat: Vida de Ramon Trias Fargas. Barcelona: La Magrana, 2009 (Premi Gaziel de Biografies i Memòries). ISBN 8498674182.
- Querido amigo, estimado maestro: cartas a Guillermo Díaz-Plaja (1929-1984). Jordi Amat, Blanca Bravo Cela, Ana Díaz-Plaja Taboada (eds.). Barcelona: Universitat de Barcelona, 2009. ISBN 8447533867.
- El llarg procés: cultura i política a la Catalunya contemporània 1937-2014. Barcelona: Tusquets, 2015. ISBN 9788490660478.
- Un país a l'ombra. Vida de Josep Maria Vilaseca Marcet (1919-1995). Barcelona: L'Avenç, 2015. ISBN 978-84-88839-88-6.
- La primavera de Múnich. Esperanza y fracaso de una transición democrática. Barcelona: Tusquets, 2016.
- Com una pàtria. Vida de Josep Benet. Barcelona: Edicions 62, 2017. ISBN 9788429775549.
- La confabulació dels irresponsables. Barcelona: Anagrama, 2017.
- La conjura de los irresponsables. Barcelona: Anagrama, 2017.
- Largo proceso, amargo sueño. Cultura y política en la Cataluña contemporánea. Barcelona: Tusquets, 2018.
- El fill del xofer. Barcelona: Edicions 62, 2020.
- El hijo del chofer. Barcelona: Tusquets, 2020.

Coauthor

- Amat, Jordi; Garcia, Betsabé (2008). Roc Boronat. El republicà que va fundar el Sindicat de Cecs de Catalunya. Barcelona: Pòrtic.

Editor

- Ridruejo, Dionisio (2017). Casi unas memorias. Barcelona: Península.

== Bibliography ==
- Elorduy, Pablo (24 February 2018). "Jordi Amat: "Hay un cierto y necesario apaciguamiento del debate civil en Catalunya"". El Salto.
- Juliá, Santos (13 June 2018). "Un sol poble, una sociedad dividida". Revista de Libros.
- Glondys, Olga (2016). "Jordi Amat: La Primavera de Múnich. Esperanza y fracaso de una transición democrática, Barcelona, Tusquets, 2016, 480 págs". Historia y Política. Ideas, Procesos y Movimientos Sociales. Madrid: UCM; CEPC: UNED: 367–372. ISSN 1575-0361.
- Gracia, Jordi (27 January 2007). "Momentos estelares". Babelia.
- Mainer, José-Carlos (24 June 2015). "Largo proceso, amargo sueño". Babelia.
- Pala, Giaime. "Jordi Amat, Els llaberints de la llibertat. Vida de Ramon Trias Fargas, Barcelona, La Magrana, 2009". Hispania Nova. Getafe: UC3M.
- Santacana, Carles (9 October 2008). "El somni d'un món més just". Quadern de Catalunya.
- Trobat, Antoni (12 December 2017). "Jordi Amat: "El règim del 78 és més fort avui que abans de l'1 d'octubre"". El Crític.
