= Batopilas, Chihuahua =

Town in the Mexican state of Chihuahua

Batopilas
- Town
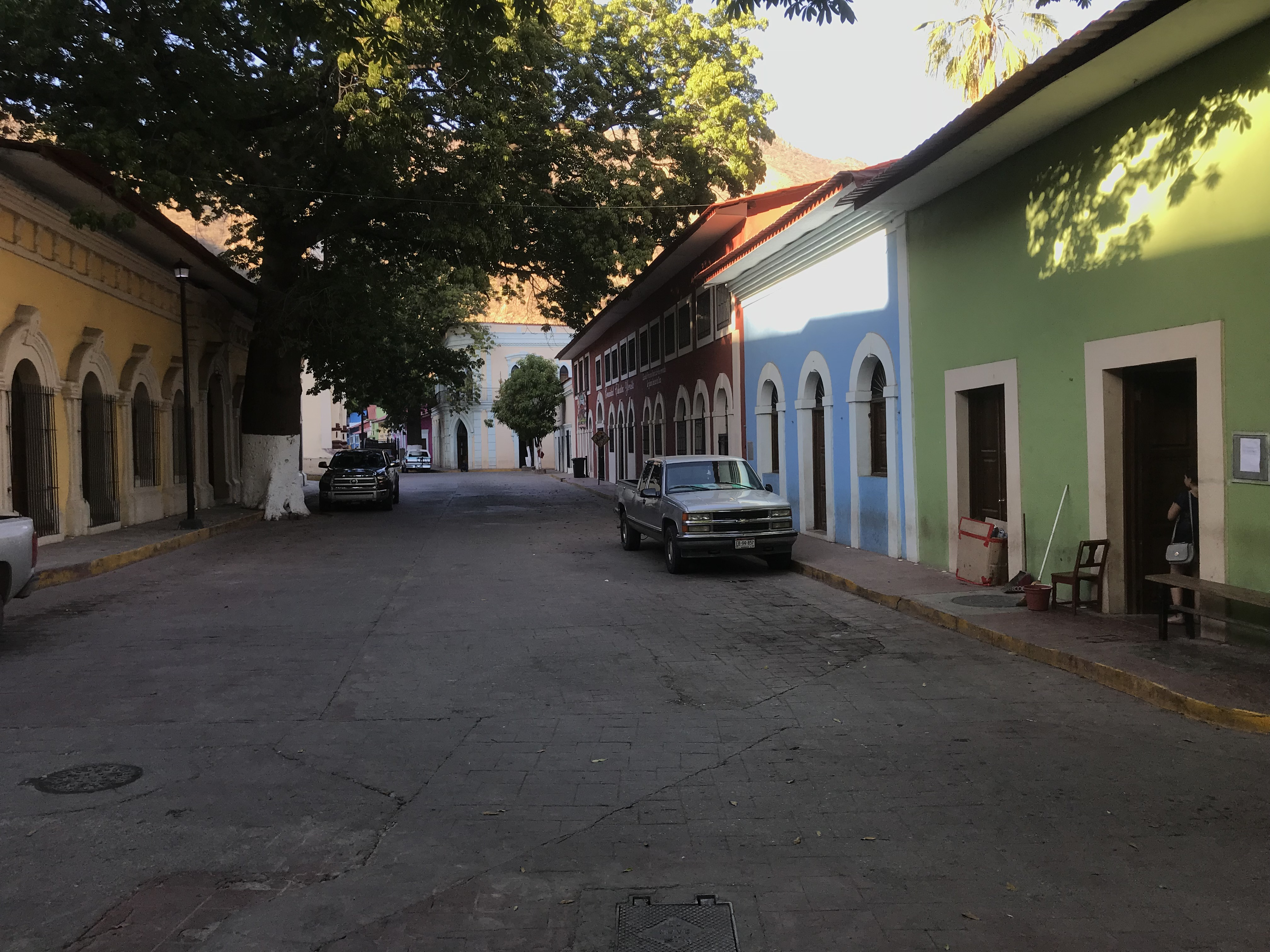
- A street of the main plaza (2017)

- Location in Chihuahua Location in Mexico
- Coordinates: 27°1′36″N 107°44′22″W
- Country: Mexico
- State: Chihuahua
- Municipality: Batopilas
- Foundation: 1708

Government
  - Mayor: Israel Varela Ordoñez
- Elevation: 578 m (1,896 ft)

Population (2010)
  - Total: 1,220
  - Demonym: Batopilense
- Time zone: UTC-6 (CST)
- Postal Code: 33400
- Area code: 649

Batopilas (Spanish: [batoˈpilas]) is a small town, and seat of the surrounding municipality of the same name, in the Mexican state of Chihuahua, located along the Batopilas River at the bottom of the Batopilas canyon, part of the Copper Canyon. As of 2010, the town of Batopilas had a population of 1,220. Its elevation above sea level is 578 metres (1,896 ft). The town is situated in a narrow valley, bordered by steep canyon walls. The government of Mexico declared it a Pueblo Mágico on October 19, 2012.

Batopilas was a prominent silver-mining center from the early 18th to the early 20th century. The city grew to 6,500 when Alexander Shepherd acquired mining rights and invested heavily in the town. It was the second city in Mexico to have electricity.

== Etymology ==
Native people of the region, Tarahumara or Rarámuri Indians called the area Bachotigori, meaning "Place of the enclosed waters", as they described the canyon, and its abundance of tropical flora and fauna to the Spanish explorers travelling through this rough part of the Chihuahuan mountains. Batopilas is a mangled Spanish version of the indigenous word Bachotigori.

== History ==
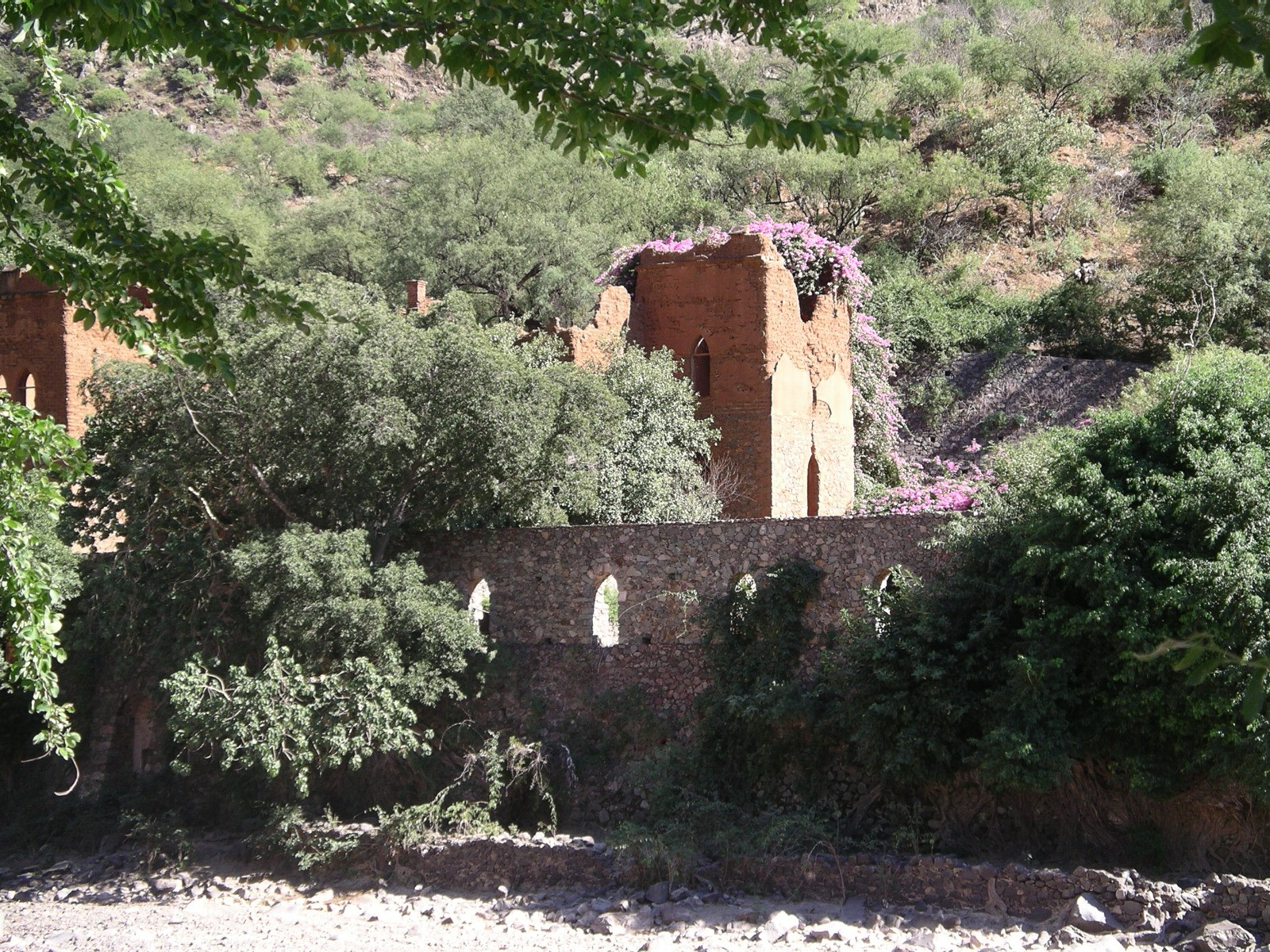
The ruins of the Hacienda San Miguel in Batopilas (2005).

The Tarahumara Indians most likely had known of silver in the area for a long time before a Spanish explorer found silver by the Río Batopilas around 1632. The discovery was in the river itself, near the bank, and the silver ore was pure white and glistening. The mine was named the Nevada Mine because of the white ore color, Nevada meaning "snow-capped" in Spanish. The Spanish exploration party took specimens of the silver ore back to Mexico City and then shipped them to Spain.

Very few local records exist from the period prior to 1845 due to two large fires that ravaged the area, the first one in 1740 and the second in 1845. Most of what is known comes from documents available in the Colonial Archives in Madrid.

=== Spanish Period (1708-1821) ===
Batopilas was officially founded in 1708 when Pedro de la Cruz filed a claim to a mine in the vicinity which he named the Guadalupe. Over time, as more and more mines were discovered, the town grew both in size and importance.

One of the most prominent structures, Hacienda San Miguel, was originally erected in the mid seventeenth century, some thirty feet above the Río Batopilas, opposite the town. It was enlarged and rebuilt in the 1740s by Don Juan José de Rivolta, who turned it into a medieval-style castle, surrounded by guard towers and defensive walls. Rivolta made a fortune in Batopilas, and wielded significant power in the area, holding among other titles, that of alcalde (mayor). Following Rivolta's death, the hacienda was occupied by Rafael Alonzo Pastrana, who discovered several rich silver veins in the area. Between 1730 and 1750, the Pastrana vein is estimated to have produced 48 million pesos, making its owner one of the richest men in the world. Pastrana further expanded the hacienda, enlarging the living quarters, and the ore processing facilities. Near the end of eighteenth century, Don Ángel Bustamante took over the hacienda and the Carmen mine. Between 1790 and 1820, the mine produced over 30 million pesos worth of silver ore.

Following his death and the Wars of Independence (1810–1821), Batopilas fell into disrepair and continued deterioration until the second half of the nineteenth century. In 1840 only 10 families remained in Batopilas.

=== American Investments (1861-1921) ===
Batopilas fortunes started to turn when Manuel Mendazona, a merchant from Culiacán, came to town in 1852. He bought and restored Hacienda Pastrana and tried to restore both the town and the mines to their former glory. Old San Antonio and Carmen mines were reopened and a tunnel was started in 1854 cutting through several veins. Unfortunately, Mendazona died suddenly in 1856 before he could fully realize his plans. His brother-in-law and executor, Guadalupe Ramírez, continued with the work for the next 5 years before selling the tunnel and mines of San Miguel to an American investor, John R. Robinson in 1861.

==== John Robinson (1861-1879) ====
John Riley Robinson, a doctor, railroad superintendent, inventor and a future patent holder, was a gristmill operator in Mansfield in the 1850s, when he formed a partnership with several Wells Fargo financiers, including the president William K. Fargo, and Directors Ashbel H. and Danford N. Barney, among others to buy silver mines in Mexico. By the late 1850s the discovery of new silver mines in California had come to a stop, but the legends of rich Mexican veins were still abound. The partners raised $50,000 to buy the mines in Batopilas, and John Robinson departed for Mexico in February 1861. On May 25, 1861, Robinson was able to buy not only the San Miguel mines and the hacienda, but also the San Antonio complex for 27,700 pesos (approximately $27,000). The newly acquired property was transferred to a newly formed Batopilas Silver Manufacturing Co. in 1862.

During his tenure as a manager of Batopilas Silver Manufacturing Co. Robinson manifested himself as a pragmatic, bent on profits businessman, and a good diplomat. He made fairly minor improvements to the mining and smelting operations to improve efficiency. The town itself grew in size and attracted a mixed group of Mexicans, Americans, Tarahumara Indians, Africans, Chinese immigrants, all of whom came in search of work and better wages. Batopilas at this time was a collection of shacks, occupied by miners, prostitutes and transients. While the mines made the company and its shareholders extremely wealthy, the local populace remained largely poor and malnourished.

During 1860s and 1870s silver and silver ore were transported south to the port of Mazatlán from where it was shipped to San Francisco, Asia, or New York City via Pacific Mail Steamship Company vessels. Mexico received no taxes or duties from this procedure, which eventually forced President Sebastián Lerdo de Tejada in 1872 to require the company to ship all silver to a newly established mint in Chihuahua City.

Continued instability and political strife in Mexico during the French Invasion followed by revolt of general Porfirio Díaz wore Robinson down. He lost his two sons and two grandchildren to typhoid fever, and decided to return to the US and sell the company in 1876. He finally succeeded selling it to a group led by the ex-Governor of Washington, DC Alexander Shepherd in 1879 for $600,000.

While improvements achieved during the tenure of John Robinson were rather modest, the town was able to get back on its feet, which didn't go unnoticed by the State government. By June 2, 1877, decree a new Canton Andrés del Río was created with Batopilas becoming its center.

It is unknown how much silver was extracted during John Robinson tenure, but it is estimated to be worth approximately $3,000,000.

==== Alexander Shepherd (1879-1921) ====
After the partners acquired the mines, they developed an ambitious plan to improve production and efficiency of the mines. They recruited several high ranking directors, such as U.S. Senator Jerome B. Chaffee, Andros Boynton Stone, head of an engineering firm, and Benjamin P. Cheney, who provided banking, railroad, and political connections. At the same time, they also retained, recruited or developed good relations with important figures of Mexican elite, such as Enrique Creel and Porfirio Díaz.

Unlike Robinson who largely stayed away from local politics, fighting bandits or modifying labor relations, Shepherd established control during his first years in Batopilas by replacing company experts and local officials with Americans and people loyal to him. He modified labor relations, establishing capitalist hire for wages system, increased the number of guards at the Hacienda San Miguel and largely eliminated organized banditry around Batopilas. The San Miguel tunnel, which was opportunistically rechristened as Porfirio Díaz tunnel, was extended, rails were laid on which the mule-drawn ore cars could be rolled, a new bridge was built across the river to bring the ore to the smelter at the Hacienda for processing. New motorized equipment was also installed at the processing plant. By 1883, the company had produced 1,250,000 pounds of refined silver.

Through his friendship with Díaz, Shepherd gained control of an area covering 132,779 acres, including ranch and timberlands and mining concessions. In 1884 and 1886, further land, mining, water concessions were obtained. The company and Shepherd were also exempted from all taxes for twenty years with the exception of minting fee imposed by the Chihuahua mint. This exemption was later renewed for another 20 years. Through the vast land ownership southwest of Batopilas, Shepherd was also able to secretly smuggle silver south through Mazatlán.

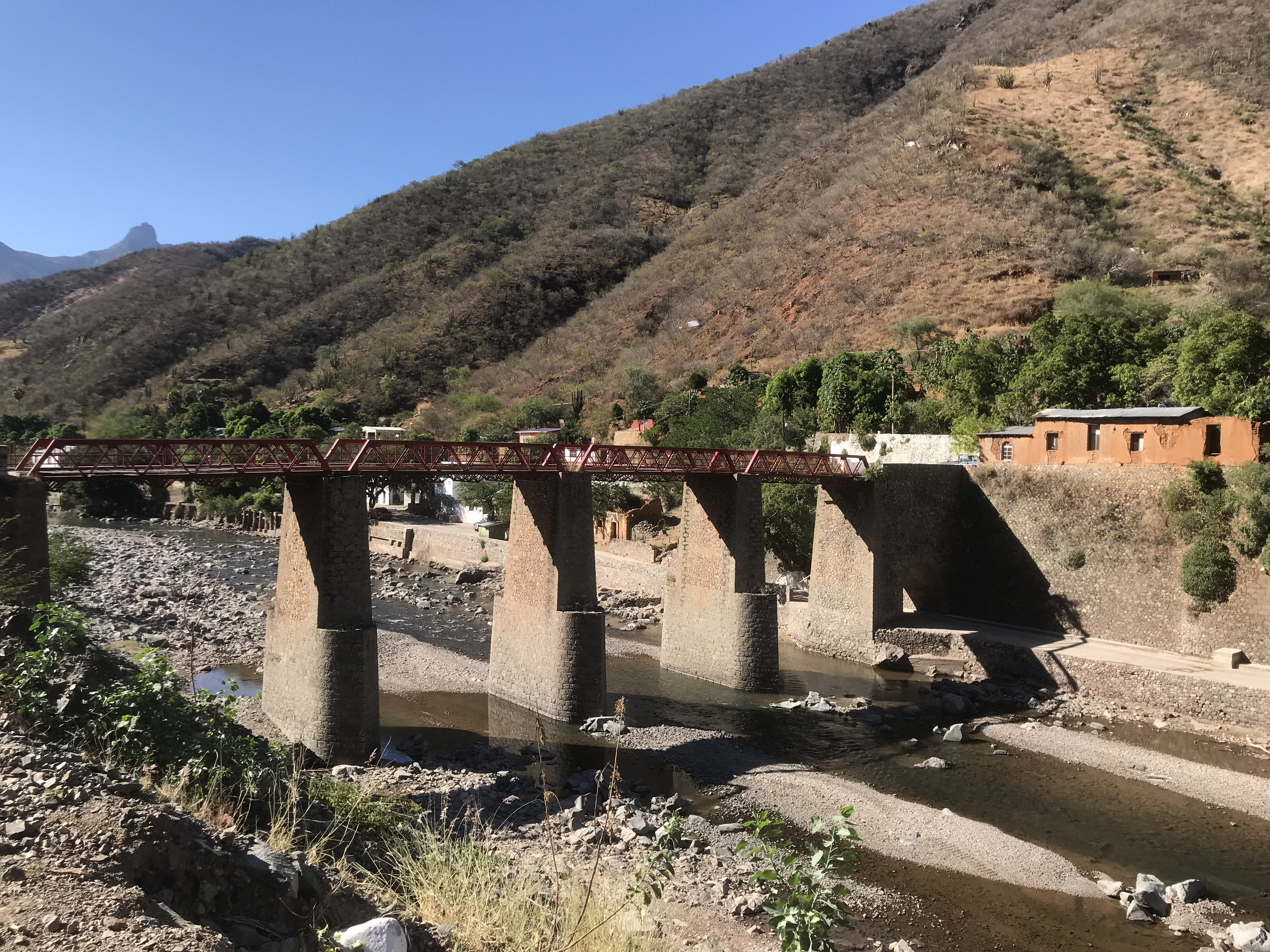
Former railroad bridge connecting mines to hacienda San Miguel

In 1887 Shepherd incorporated the Batopilas Consolidated Mining Company which included 350 separate workings and 10 companies owned by the original Batopilas Mining Company. By this point the population of Batopilas swelled to over 6,500 people. In 1884 the company paid its first dividend worth $2,000,000 at the time the company's stock was introduced on New York Stock Exchange, but stopped the dividend payments in 1887. Falling silver prices towards the end of the 19th century forced the company to invest in technology trying to maintain their profits, resulting in shrinking workforce. By 1906 the town population was reduced to about 4,000 people.

Alexander Shepherd died on September 12, 1902, from complications of peritonitis. He was briefly succeeded by his son-in-law E. A. Quintard, who died a year later. After Quintard's death, Alexander Shepherd Jr., eldest son of Alexander Shepherd, took over as a manager of the company until its closure in 1921.

After Shepherd's death in 1902, the company's directors could finally review the books regarding the true costs and production values of the mines. It was found that Shepherd had wildly overestimated certain expenses, for example, ore refining and ore hauling costs decreased nearly twice after his death. It is also unknown how much silver was transported and sold through the ports on Mexican Pacific coast, which was never reported to the company. Shepherd also reported annual labor costs of approximately $390 per worker to the government, but his personal notes indicated that they were only $75, more in line with similar mines in Sinaloa and Sonora.

One hand, Shepherd did much to improve the town, building bridges, aqueducts, roads, and a hydroelectric plant, which made Batopilas only the second city in Mexico after Mexico City to have electricity. He also opened and improved medical facilities to serve miners and other town residents. Most of these improvements were however primarily built to improve mining operations and living conditions at Hacienda San Miguel. Most miners made barely enough money to get them by, in fact, the average annual labor cost per worker was less than 2% of the value of silver produced on average by each worker annually. Most miners rarely lived past 40, many of them succumbing to silicosis as the company never invested in safety, and the medical facilities were inadequate to provide more than just basic services.

The rise of nationalism in Mexico and dissatisfaction with widespread injustice and corruption of Porfirio Díaz administration finally resulted in the Mexican Revolution in 1910. Most foreigners, especially Americans were forced to abandon their holding in Mexico and flee to the safety of El Paso. Pancho Villa and his lieutenants who controlled most of Northern Mexico made it practically impossible to safely transport silver anywhere from the mines which significantly curtailed the production. Following the years of revolution and subsequent industry, and land nationalization forced the owners of Batopilas mines to close them officially in 1921.

=== Aftermath (1921-current time) ===
Following the American withdrawal and mine closing, the company property was divided among the people of the canyons as part of the Mexican agrarian reform. By the late 1990s 670,000 acres were given to 2,369 families in the Batopilas area. Nearly all of the allocated land is only suitable for goat grazing, and only 16,000 acres could be used as farmland. In 1980s Batopilas was considered the leading center of goat production in the State of Chihuahua.

Most people left, and by the mid-1930s there were only a little over 400 people left in Batopilas. The hydroelectric plant built by Shepherd was destroyed in 1940 during a massive flood that devastated the town, and Batopilas had no electricity until 1989. The mineral prices rebounded in the mid-1930s and during the World War 2, and while they had no noticeable effect on Batopilas, the nearby copper works at La Bufa were affected. A one-lane dirt road was cut through the mountains and canyons by the mining company in 1940s connecting Creel to La Bufa. A road construction from La Bufa to Batopilas started in 1975 and finished in 1978, finally breaking the town's isolation.

After 1984 drug raids drove producers from the plains into the mountains, Batopilas along with other remote communities in the Sierra Tarahumara were overtaken by the cartels. It was also reported recently that a former mayor of Batopilas was executed, while the current one survived an assassination attempt.

It is hard to gauge how much silver was mined from Batopilas mines over the years, one estimate (Wilson and Panczner) is that mines in the area have produced seven times as much silver as come from the famous silver mine of Kongsberg in Norway. Little mining is now done in Batopilas, though there is still exploration and claims being assessed in the general area.

== Geography ==
The town of Batopilas lies along the Rio Batopilas, in the narrowest part of the canyon of the same name. It extends about 5 km along the right bank of the river. The main connection to the outside world is a five-hour bus connection to Creel along the newly finished Batopilas Road travelling through a community of Samachique. The road was widened and paved and a new La Bufa bridge was erected in 2016 for the total cost of 1,221,000,000 pesos.

From Batopilas a dirt road extends to a largely abandoned community of Satevó, about 3 miles away. The original road was built by Peñoles, a large mining company, in 1990 while doing explorations in the area. In 1993 the one-lane road was extended to San Ignacio, and from there almost to Sinaloa state-line.

=== Climate ===
The climate of Batopilas falls on the boundaries of three climatic types: Aw, tropical savanna; Cwa, subtropical with hot summers and dry winters; and BSh. hot, semi-arid steppe. Using the Köppen climate classification system the climate is Cwa. Using the Trewartha climate classification system the climate is BShl: semi-arid steppe with hot summers and mild winters.

Climate data for Batopilas, Chihuahua
Month	Jan	Feb	Mar	Apr	May	Jun	Jul	Aug	Sep	Oct	Nov	Dec	Year
Record high °C (°F)	34.5 (94.1)	39.0 (102.2)	40.0 (104.0)	45.0 (113.0)	45.5 (113.9)	45.0 (113.0)	44.0 (111.2)	42.0 (107.6)	44.0 (111.2)	41.5 (106.7)	37.0 (98.6)	34.0 (93.2)	45.5 (113.9)
Mean daily maximum °C (°F)	24.5 (76.1)	26.9 (80.4)	29.3 (84.7)	33.6 (92.5)	37.1 (98.8)	39.1 (102.4)	34.5 (94.1)	33.8 (92.8)	34.4 (93.9)	33.3 (91.9)	29.2 (84.6)	24.5 (76.1)	31.7 (89.1)
Daily mean °C (°F)	17.0 (62.6)	19.1 (66.4)	21.7 (71.1)	25.5 (77.9)	29.0 (84.2)	31.6 (88.9)	28.6 (83.5)	28.3 (82.9)	28.0 (82.4)	26.0 (78.8)	21.9 (71.4)	17.9 (64.2)	24.5 (76.1)
Mean daily minimum °C (°F)	9.8 (49.6)	11.2 (52.2)	14.1 (57.4)	17.5 (63.5)	21.0 (69.8)	23.9 (75.0)	22.5 (72.5)	22.2 (72.0)	21.6 (70.9)	18.6 (65.5)	14.5 (58.1)	11.1 (52.0)	2.5 (36.5)
Record low °C (°F)	2.5 (36.5)	−5.0 (23.0)	5.5 (41.9)	8.0 (46.4)	10.0 (50.0)	16.5 (61.7)	19.0 (66.2)	19.0 (66.2)	15.0 (59.0)	11.0 (51.8)	6.5 (43.7)	−4.5 (23.9)	−5.0 (23.0)
Average precipitation mm (inches)	44.0 (1.73)	25.0 (0.98)	22.0 (0.87)	5.0 (0.20)	8.0 (0.31)	50.0 (1.97)	157.0 (6.18)	153.0 (6.02)	76.0 (2.99)	43.0 (1.69)	22.0 (0.87)	55.0 (2.17)	660.0 (25.98)
Average precipitation days (≥ 0.1 mm)	3.5	2.3	1.6	0.7	0.9	5.8	17.0	14.4	8.2	3.3	2.4	3.9	64.0
Source: Batopilas, Chihuahua

== Tourism ==
Large fortunes that were made in mining can be most visibly observed in several haciendas which belonged to prominent people of Batopilas. The most prominent of them, called the Hacienda San Miguel, was rebuilt and enlarged after Alexander Shepherd moved to Batopilas in 1880. It stands across the river from the town and the most productive mine during Shepherd's residence. The mansion has long been in ruins with an exception of a hotel and a few shacks occupied by local families who give tours to visitors for a small fee (10 pesos as of 2017). Other haciendas include Antigua Casa de Raya, La Casa Cural, La Casa Biggler and Casa Barffuson, residence of Marquis Ángel de Bustamante.

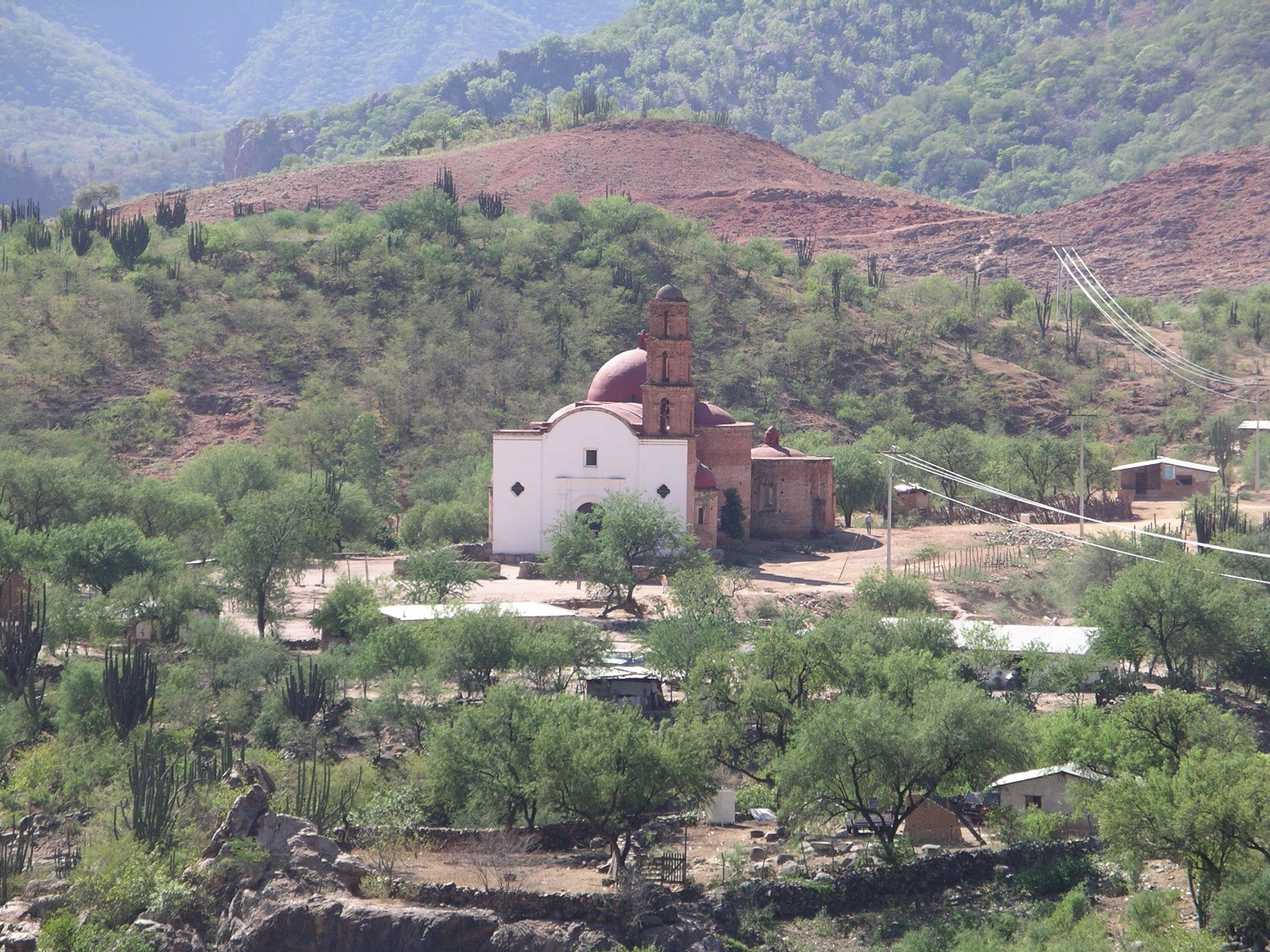
The Satevó Mission near Batopilas, often called the "Lost Mission" (2005)

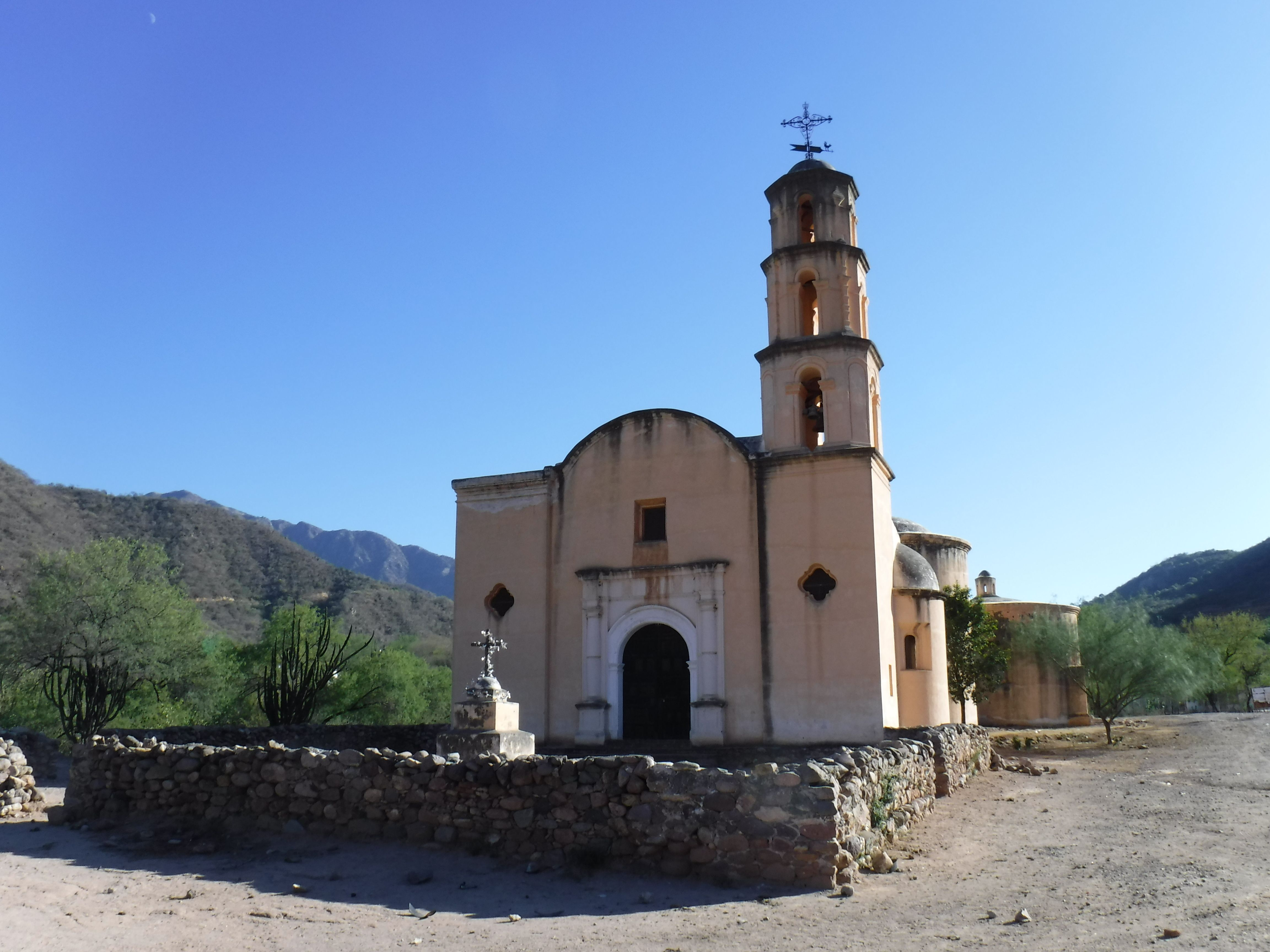
Mission of Santo Ángel Custodio de Satevó near Batopilas (2017)

The small downtown area features several restaurants and hotels, and also houses Museo de Batopilas, a small exhibit featuring information and artifacts related to town's mining past.

Lying approximately 5 miles (8.0 km) southeast of Batopilas is Misión Ángel Custodio Satevó, built by Jesuits between 1760 and 1764. This church is unique due its isolation and oftentimes called the "Lost Mission." After the expulsion of the Society of Jesus in 1767, the mission was taken over by the town of Batopilas and was largely neglected until 1974 when the cathedral was transferred to Franciscans. The building was since then restored in 2006–2010.

== Notable people ==
- Manuel Gómez Morín, Mexican politician and a founding member of the National Action Party
- José María Aguirre y Fierro (1836–1906), poet and politician
- Gabriel Aguirre y Fierro (1826–1908), politician and governor of Chihuahua
- Arnulfo Quimare, Raramuri Marathon Runner, First place in 2006.

== In popular culture ==
Batopilas is the subject of an extended, discursive, but highly charged conversation between actors Marlon Brando and Alex Montoya in a pulqueria in the 1966 Hollywood movie The Appaloosa.

== Sources ==
- Wendell E. Wilson, Christopher S. Panczner, "Famous Mineral Localities: the Batopilas District, Chihuahua, Mexico," The Mineralogical Record, 17(1):61-80, 1986 January–February.
- Hart, John Mason (2008). The Silver of Sierra Madre. Tucson, Arizona: The University of Arizona Press. ISBN 978-0-8165-2704-5.
- Brodie, Walter M. (1909). History of the Native-Silver Mines of Batopilas. Mining and Engineering World. Vol. 30. pp. 1105–1110.
- Raat, William Dirk (1996). Mexico's Sierra Tarahumara: A Photohistory of the People of the Edge. Norman, Oklahoma: University of Oklahoma Press. ISBN 978-0-8061-2815-3.
