= Hinojosa del Campo =

- Municipality
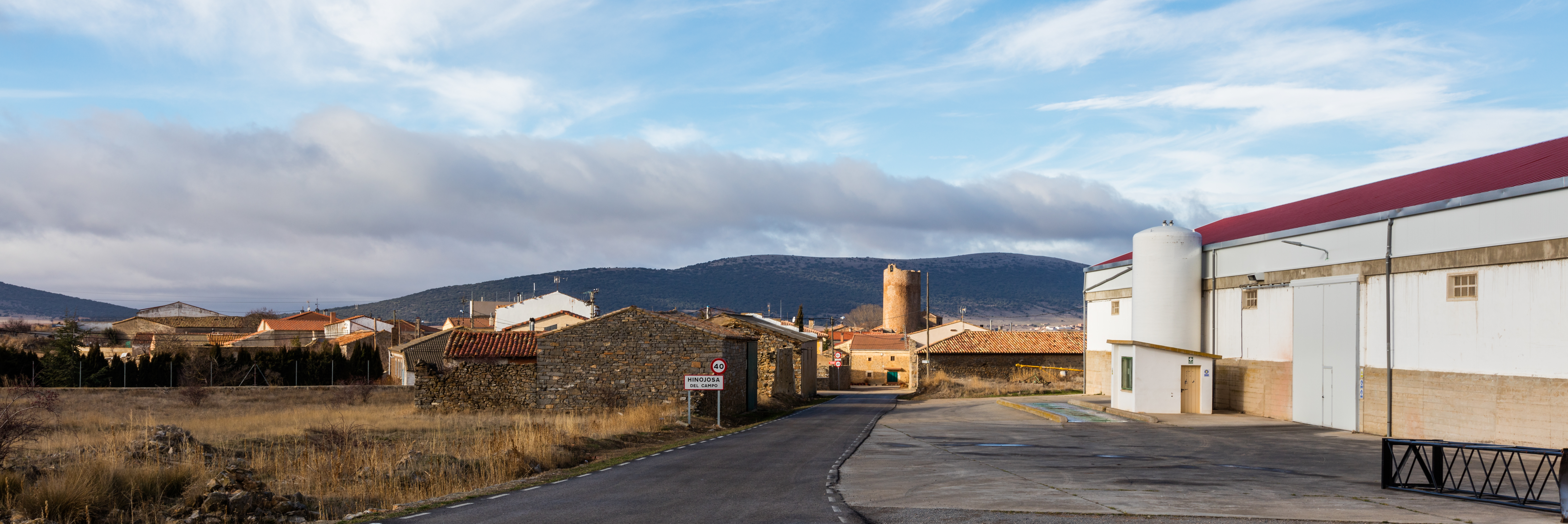
- Street of Hinojosa del Campo

- Flag Coat of arms

- Location in Spain. Hinojosa del Campo (Spain)
- Coordinates: 41°44′20″N 2°05′55″W
- Country: Spain
- Autonomous community: Castile and León
- Province: Soria
- Municipality: Hinojosa del Campo

Area
  - Total: 26.07 km^{2} (10.07 sq mi)
- Elevation: 1,034 m (3,392 ft)

Population (2025-01-01)
  - Total: 24
  - Density: 0.92/km^{2} (2.4/sq mi)
- Time zone: UTC+1 (CET)
  - Summer (DST): UTC+2 (CEST)
- Website: Official website

Hinojosa del Campo is a municipality located in the province of Soria, Castile and León, Spain. According to the 2004 census (INE), the municipality has a population of 41 inhabitants.
