= Bernardo Calderón Cabrera =

Mexican architect

- Born: October 16, 1922; Mexico City
- Died: December 21, 2003 (aged 81); Mexico City
- Education: Universidad Nacional Autónoma de México
- Occupation: Architect

Bernardo Calderón Cabrera (October 16, 1922 in Mexico City – December 21, 2003 in Mexico City) was a Mexican architect.

== Biography ==
Calderón studied at the Escuela Nacional de Arquitectura (ENA) of the Universidad Nacional Autónoma de México (UNAM) from 1940 to 1945, where he later taught from 1947 to May 2003. In 1980 he graduated as Master of Architecture.

He worked together with Manuel Ortiz Monasterio, and later with his brother José Luis. His works included several notable buildings, amongst others the seat of the faculty of architecture in the UNAM's Ciudad Universitaria, as well as restorations of larger churches in his hometown.
