= Hinojosas de Calatrava =

Coordinates: 38°37′N 4°08′W

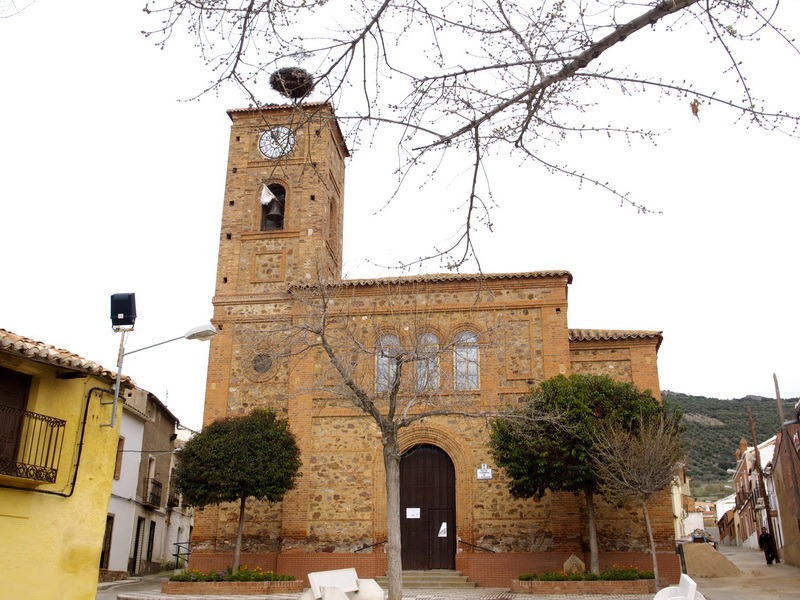
Parish Church of Hinojosas de Calatrava, in the province of Ciudad Real (Spain)

Flag of Hinojosas de Calatrava

Coat of arms of Hinojosas de Calatrava

Hinojosas de Calatrava is a municipality in Ciudad Real, Castile-La Mancha, Spain. It has a population of 722.
