= Christian Calderone =

German politician (born 1977)

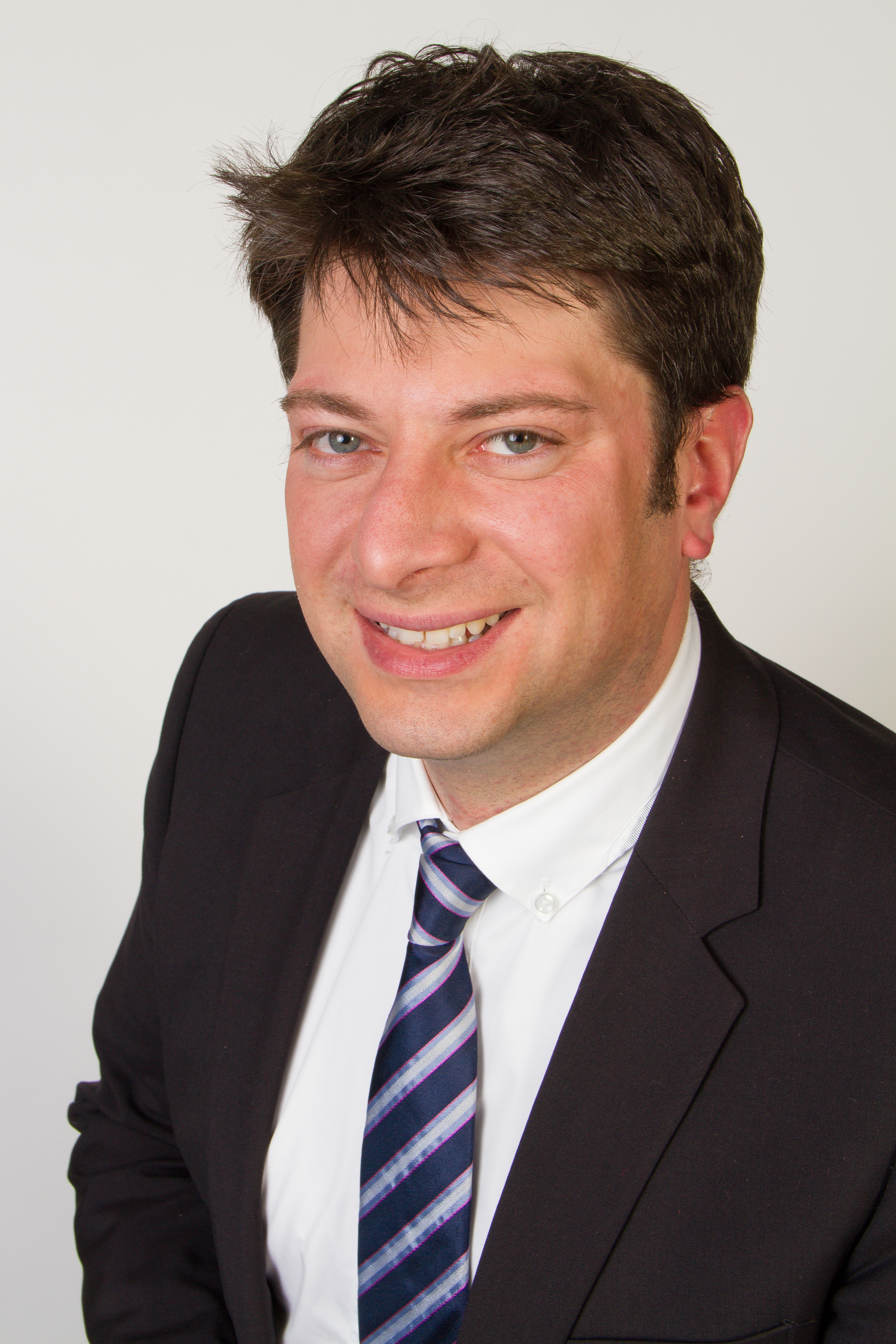
- Calderone in 2013

Member of the Landtag of Lower Saxony
- Incumbent
- Assumed office 19 February 2013
- Constituency: Bersenbrück

Personal details
- Born: 2 July 1977 (age 48) Bremen
- Party: Christian Democratic Union (since 1996)

Christian Calderone (born 2 July 1977 in Bremen) is a German politician serving as a member of the Landtag of Lower Saxony since 2013. He has served as chairman of the Christian Democratic Union and Osnabrück since 2010.
