= Calderone Concert Hall =

Calderone Concert Hall was a 2,500-seat music venue located at 145 N Franklin St. in Hempstead, New York, which was popular in the 1970s and 1980s. It was one of the theaters founded by Salvatore Calderone. Many notable bands performed at the venue such as ZZ Top, Aerosmith, Jerry Garcia, Gentle Giant, Strawbs, Kiss, Rainbow, Be-Bop Deluxe and Santana.

Lou Reed performed at this location, when it was known as the Hempstead Theatre, on (Boxing Day) 26 December 1972 during Reed's Transformer tour. A recording of this concert, plus a remote radio interview for WLIR, became the Lou Reed album American Poet.
