= Salvatore Calderone =

American businessman (1876-1929)

- Born: 1876; Sicily, Italy
- Died: 1929 (aged 52–53)

Salvatore Calderone (1876–1929) was an early American movie theater magnate and founder of the Calderone chain of theaters located on Long Island, New York. He was noted as being the "Master Showman of Nassau County."

== Early life ==
Calderone was born in Sicily, Italy and came to America in 1893 to work as a newspaperman. He was employed first by the New Orleans newspaper, The Picayune, and six years later in 1899 came to New York City to work for the newspaper, Il Progresso. During this period of his life he was also known as having an interest in a California fruit producing enterprise.

== Entry into the Theater Business ==
He became interested in the theater business, and in 1907 partnered with his brother to acquire and manage the first of a number of theaters located in the lower part of Manhattan. In 1910 his theater located at 331 Bowery was badly damaged in a fire that broke out in the upper floors of the building it occupied. The brothers built up a successful enterprise, acquiring several movie houses which they managed until the outbreak of World War I, when attendance dropped off enough for them to end their interests in the theater business of New York City.

== Expansion ==
Not long after the war began in 1914, Calderone decided to leave New York City, and came to Hempstead, located in Nassau County, Long Island, where he acquired the Strand Theatre, located on Front Street. This new enterprise prospered under his management and he soon decided that Hempstead and the surrounding villages of that part of Long Island retained great promise for an expansion of the movie theater business. Along with other prominent individuals he formed a corporation named the "Calderone Corporation" that built the first big movie house, named the Hempstead Theatre, which was built c. 1920. With this success, Calderone and his partners either built or acquired a number of other theaters within a very short period of time, quickly becoming the largest movie theater chain located in Nassau County.

Like so many other theater owners and managers, Calderone was in favor of allowing his theaters to open up for showings on Sunday, which was against the law in New York State in the 1920s. He, along with several other Long Island theater owners, were indicted for breaking the law and showing movies or theatrical performances on a Sunday during the spring of 1923. All involved plead guilty except Calderone, against whom the charges were dismissed, while the others received suspended sentences, however popular momentum was with the theater owners. A few years later, local municipalities on Long Island began using their power to let theaters show movies on Sundays - which was allowable under the parameters of the state law. Calderone's St. James Theatre, located in St. James, Suffolk County, Long Island, began showing films on Sundays in 1930.

By 1927, the Calderone chain operated more than half-a-dozen theaters in Nassau County, including two in Hempstead, one in Lynbrook, one in Valley Stream, one in Glen Cove, one in Westbury, and one in Mineola. Calderone soon became "...a powerful figure in the theatrical field...," and acted as the guiding hand behind the chain. During the late summer of 1927 unionized workers threatened to strike against Calderone if they did not receive higher wages, while other nearby theater owners agreed to the unions demands, Calderone refused, and the strike ensued. From late 1928 through early 1929, Calderone entered into negotiations to sell his five large Nassau County theaters to the Fox Theatres Corporation. The negotiated price was said to have been $3 million.

== Movies vs. Vaudeville ==
During the period of Salvatore Calderone's management of his theater chain (called during his day the 'Calderone Theatre Circuit') he aggressively promoted films and vaudeville acts. Each of his theaters could accommodate both genres, and allowed Calderone to offer an immense variety of acts. Nearly every act would be booked across one or more theaters in the chain, moving from one community to another, as was noted in many advertisements during the 1920s. African American performers, who were usually part of revues or cabarets, were featured regularly. Calderone's Rivoli Theatre in Hempstead was advertised as featuring "Vaudeville Always."

== Death ==
Salvatore Calderone had been having health problems before he suffered a heart attack in the early morning of Sunday, February 10, 1929, at his home at 80 Terrace Avenue, Hempstead, Long Island. Dr. Benjamin Seaman was called to the home where Calderone died at 5:30 in the morning surrounded by his family. At the time of his death local newspapers remarked, "His life is an example of what can be accomplished by those who come to America from other places. It shows that opportunities are always here for those who are ready to seize them."

His funeral service was held at Our Lady of Loretto on Greenwich Street in Hempstead on Tuesday, February 12, 1929, followed by burial at Calvary Cemetery. His immediate survivors included his wife, Rosario Calderone, and sons Frank (who helped run the chain), Roy, and Anthony. While his death announcement notes Calderone was buried in Calvary Cemetery, at some point his body was removed to Greenfield Cemetery, located in Uniondale, Nassau County, Long Island, New York, where he was re-interred in an elegant mausoleum.

== Legacy ==
While many sources indicate the Calderone chain was sold to Fox in 1929, it appears that Salvatore Calderone's death put an end to that plan as the theater chain remained in operation for many years after his death. His son, Dr. Frank A. Calderone (1901 - 1987), who was an expert on preventive medicine and a leading early figure in the World Health Organization, continued to operate many of the theaters created by his father until around 1980. In addition to those located in Nassau County, the company also owned and operated theaters in neighboring Suffolk County.

During Salvatore Calderone's life, the company built and managed most of its theaters. After his death, the company appears to have begun leasing out the theaters to other management chains, as Frank Calderone left the management of the company to others and did not return to an active role until 1954. According to Rob Boehm of cinematreasures.org, "The Cove, Rivoli and Calderone were operated by Skouras. The Valley Stream and Lynbrook by Century. UA succeeded Skouras and Century folded. The Valley Stream operated as the Rio for a time before it was demolished. The Lynbrook went over to UA."

== Calderone Theatre & Concert Hall ==
The chain opened one of their most expensive theaters in June 1949 in Hempstead, Long Island. Named the "Calderone Theatre," it was designed by William Lescaze (1896–1969) one of the pioneers of modernism in American architecture and cost $2 million and seated 2,500 people. At the time of its dedication, a plaque was erected in the new theater honoring Salvatore Calderone and his work in founding the chain that bore his name. The Calderone Theatre eventually became the Calderone Concert Hall, which required the installation of a stage as it was the only Calderone theater not to have one at the outset. Due to its fine acoustics, it was sought after as a performance venue for leading bands and musicians. The Calderone family sold the hall in 1982 to Rana Management who planned to renovate the building. Performers who played at the hall during the 1970s and 1980s included Santana (at least four times), Fleetwood Mac>, ZZ Top, Aerosmith, Jerry Garcia, Gentle Giant, and Rainbow. In the 1990s it was converted into a seven-screen multiplex cinema. This enterprise didn't last long and after closing became Faith Baptist Church.

== Theater Locations 1907 - 1949 ==
- 331 Bowery Street, c. 1910, New York, NY.
- Calderone Theatre, 1949, 145 N. Franklin Street, Hempstead, Nassau County, NY. Designed by the famous modernist architect, William Lescaze (1896–1969). The theater was divided up into a multiplex and later became the Calderone Concert Hall, sold by the Calderone family in 1982. The building is now being renovated by a local church for use by its congregation.
- Cove Theatre, 1927, 90 School Street, Glen Cove, Nassau County, NY. Designed by Douglas Pairman Hall. Douglas P. Hall and Paul C. Reilly had a partnership in New York City focusing on the design of theaters. By the late 1970s it had been converted into a dinner theater and has since been demolished.
- Hempstead Theatre, 1922, 310 Fulton Street, Hempstead, Nassau County, NY. Designed by Eugene DeRosa. Eventually sold to become an office for the State Department of Motor Vehicles (DMV). Currently it is occupied by a church that moved in during the 1990s.
- Lynbrook Theatre, c. 1923, 321 Merrick Road, Lynbrook, Nassau County, NY. Designed by Harrison G. Wiseman (1878–1945). Wiseman was a very prominent theater architect who designed at least two dozen theaters in New York City in addition to those designed in Nassau County. The Lynbrook was converted into a multiplex and is still operated by Regal Cinemas.
- Mineola Theatre, c. 1926 – 1927, 120 Mineola Boulevard, Mineola, Nassau County, NY. This theater was under the management of Calderone until just shortly before his death when it was turned back over to its owners who sold it in 1930. It replaced an older theater that dated back to at least 1916. At some point after 1930 it returned to the chain and remained part of it until c. 1980-1982 when it was sold. It has since been demolished and replaced by an office building.
- Rivoli Theatre, c. 1925 – 1926, 145 Main Street, Hempstead, Nassau County, NY. At the time ground was broken, this theater was called the 'Up Town' but was renamed the Rivoli by the time it opened on April 3, 1926. Sources vary on whether it was designed by Douglas Pairman Hall or Harrison G. Wiseman (1878–1945). The theater was later rechristened the "Calderone II" and in 1978 was donated by Frank Calderone to Adelphi University when it became the Adelphi Calderone Theatre (ACT). The theater no longer stands and has been replaced by a building named "The Rivoli House."
- St. James Theatre, opened in October 1929, 176 Second Street, St. James, Suffolk County, NY. This theater may have been acquired by the Calderone chain after Salvatore Calderone's death. Closed in the early 1950s, the building still stands. It remained in its original interior configuration until recently (2012), when the owners extended the balcony level throughout the entire building creating a full second floor.
- Strand Theatre, purchased c. 1914, Front Street, Hempstead, Nassau County, NY. The first theater purchased by Calderone in Hempstead. It closed in June 1922 after Calderone's new theater opened, and it remained closed apparently due to building violations, but Calderone indicated he might re-open it if the issues could be resolved. It did eventually reopen, however it closed again in April 1926. The reason given was that it was showing second run films and losing money. By the end of 1928 the building was being used as the branch office of the Salvation Army.
- Valley Stream Theatre, c. 1925, 69 Rockaway Avenue, Valley Stream, Nassau County, NY. Calderone sold this theater c. 1980–1982. During the 1980s live shows were being shown in the theater, and by that time the name may have been changed to "The Rio." It was demolished c. 1997–1998.
- Westbury Theatre, 1927, 250 Post Avenue, Westbury, Nassau County, NY. Designed by Douglas Pairman Hall. The theater closed in 2001 and is being renovated into a performing arts center named "The Space at Westbury."
