= José Luis Calderón Cabrera =

Mexican architect

- Born: November 6, 1924; Mexico City
- Died: June 7, 2004 (aged 79); Mexico City
- Education: Universidad Nacional Autónoma de México
- Occupation: Architect
- Awards: Medalla al Mérito Académico, Universidad Anáhuac

José Luis Calderón Cabrera (born Mexico City, November 6, 1924 – Mexico City, June 7, 2004) was a Mexican architect. He was professor at the Universidad Anáhuac campus del Norte and at the Escuela Nacional de Arquitectura of the Universidad Nacional Autónoma de México.

On his early years he worked together with his brother Bernardo, mostly restoring churches and monuments. After the brothers split, Calderón continued his work until the 1980s, when he became a restoration project manager himself. After the 1985 earthquake in Mexico City, Calderon became a member of the professional group that assessed the remaining buildings' structural conditions.

In 2004, he was awarded the Medal of Academic Merits by the Universidad Anáhuac. Soon after his death, Universidad Anahuac dedicated a memorial to his work and legacy.

Calderón main professional activity was architectural restoration, which he did for landmarks such as Casa de los Azulejos.

He was also a well reputed painter, and his watercolor works were all architecture related. During the late 80's he took a trip to Europe, to paint castles by the Loire river. In Mexico, his work included catholic temples like the Zacatecas cathedral, or architectural details like the door of the Casa de Iturbide, in Mexico City.
