= Enrique O. Aragón =

Mexican psychologist

Enrique Octavio Aragón Echeagaray (born Mexico City on 22 March 1880; died Veracruz on 16 June 1942) was a Mexican psychologist and physician, and interim rector of Mexico's National Autonomous University for a short period in 1934.

He studied at the Escuela Nacional Preparatoria and subsequently at the National School of Medicine, where he received his degree as physician in 1904.

There is a high school with his name in Iztapalapa, Federal District.
