= Cecilia Calderón =

Ecuadorian politician (born 1949)

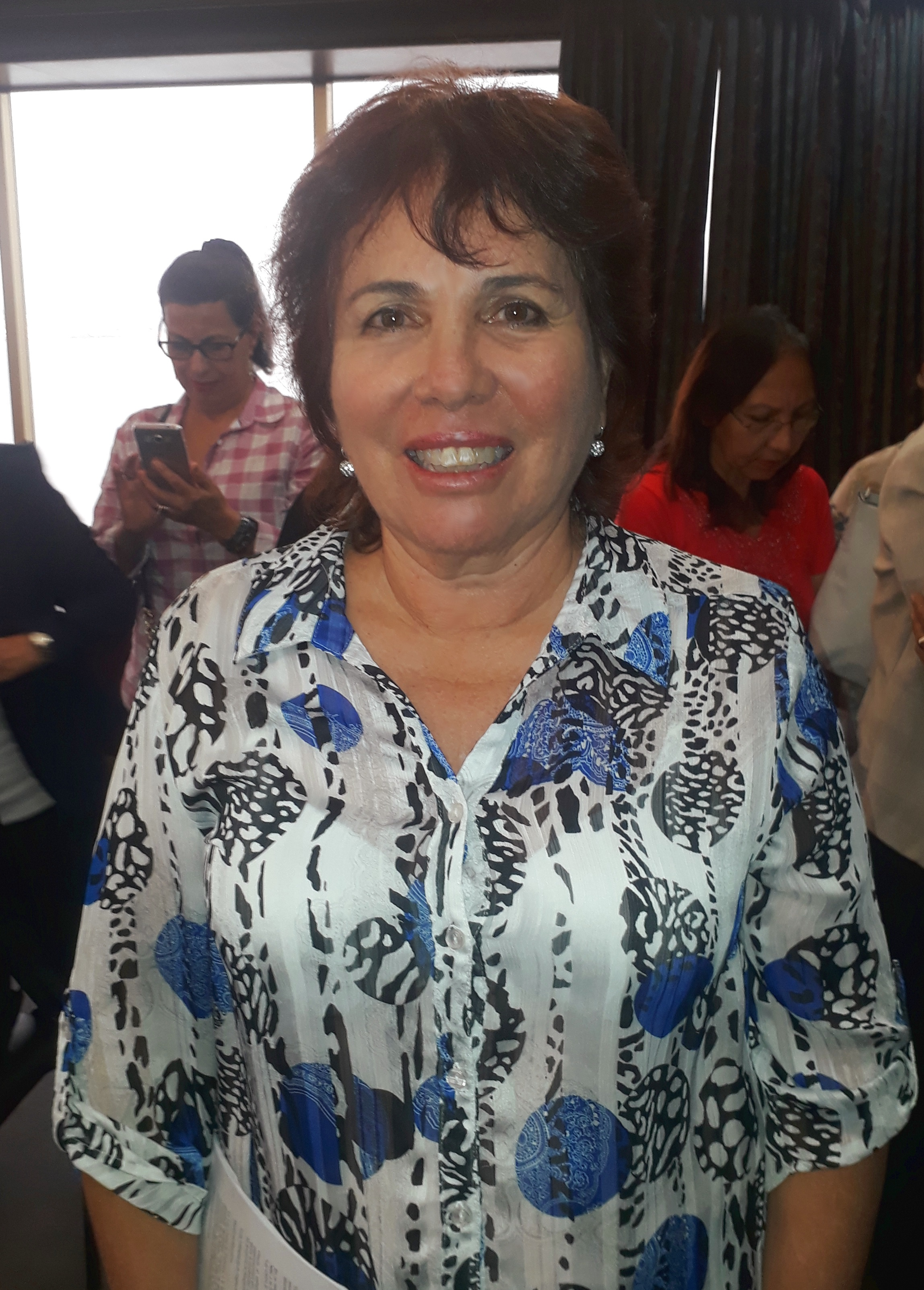

National Congress of Ecuador
- In office 1998–2003
- In office 1986–1992

Vice President of the Provincial Council of Guayas
- In office 1980–1984

Personal details
- Born: 5 December 1949 (age 76) Guayaquil
- Party: Alfarista Radical Front
- Spouse: Iván Castro Patiño
- Education: Catholic University of Guayaquil
- Occupation: Economist and politician

Cecilia Calderón Prieto (born 5 December 1949) is an Ecuadorian economist and former politician representing Guayas Province belonging to the Alfarista Radical Front (FRA).

== Early life ==
Cecilia Calderón was born in Guayaquil on 5 December 1949, the daughter of Abdón Calderón Muñoz and Rosita Prieto. Even in her youth, Calderón leaned towards politics, actively volunteering for the presidential campaign of Andrés Córdova, the Liberal candidate for the 1968 Ecuadorian general election. She attended and graduated from the Catholic University of Guayaquil as an economist.

== Leadership of the FRA ==
During the Ecuadorian general election of 1978–79, Calderón actively participated in the campaign of Abdón Calderón Muñoz, her father and head and founder of the FRA. Shortly after the first round of the election, Calderon Muñoz was murdered on the orders of the military dictatorship on 29 November 1978, leaving Calderón as leader of the party, making Calderon the first woman in Ecuador to assume leadership of a political party. Calderón fought for justice for her father, which was granted when President Jaime Roldós Aguilera declared former government minister Bolívar Jarrín Cahueñas guilty of the murder, marking the first time in Ecuador's history that a political crime had been sanctioned by a government of Ecuador.

In the provincial elections for Guayas Province of 1980, Calderón was elected the first female member of the Provincial Council and because of the high number of votes for her, she won the Vice President's seat in the Council. Calderón was then in 1986 elected to the National Congress of Ecuador, becoming the only woman to sit on that congress. She faced some discomfort on account of her gender, such as the lack of a female bathroom that led her to ask the President of the Congress for a key to a private bathroom. In the 1988 legislative election, Calderón was reelected to Congress, one of only two members representing the FRA. In 1991, she accrued much criticism for criticizing the high budget of the Ecuadorian Armed Forces.

=== Later political career ===
In the 1998 Ecuadorian legislative election, Calderón was elected as a national deputy for the 1998–2003 term, representing the Democratic Left party. During the 2002 presidential election, she publicly endorsed former president and Democratic Left candidate Rodrigo Borja Cevallos.

Several years later, she unsuccessfully ran for a seat in the 2007 Constituent Assembly election as a candidate for the National Democratic Concertation party.

Calderón was also a candidate for Guayas prefect in the 2019 Ecuadorian local elections, representing the Juntos Podemos movement.
