= Batopilas River =

Location
- Country: Mexico

Physical characteristics
- Mouth
  - coordinates: 26°51′39″N 107°50′25″W

The Batopilas River is a river located in Batopilas, Chihuahua, Mexico, forming part of the Copper Canyon.

== See also ==
- List of rivers of Mexico
