= Jean-Charles Roman d'Amat =

French librarian and historian

- Born: 12 May 1887; Crots, Provence-Alpes-Côte d'Azur, France
- Died: 29 March 1976 (aged 88); Versailles, Yvelines, Île-de-France region, France
- Occupations: librarian, historian

Jean-Charles Roman d'Amat (Crots, 12 May 1887 – Versailles, 29 March 1976) was a French librarian and historian. He was one of the editors of Dictionnaire de biographie française.
