= Altagracia Calderón =

Mexican nurse and militant

Altagracia Calderón (1837, Jalacingo - October 17, 1917, Puebla), nicknamed "La cabra" or "La charra", was a Mexican nurse and militant. She fought against the French during the Second French Intervention in her country.

== Biography ==
She was born in Jalacingo, a town which at that time was part of the municipality of Teziutlán. She joined the militias that formed in Teziutlán against the invading troops of the Second French Empire alongside her husband, Gabino Ortega, commander of the cavalry troops, who was killed in military action. She joined the troops of Ignacio Zaragoza to defend the city of Puebla during the Battle of Puebla in May 1862. She worked in the infirmary of the army of the Federal Republic of Mexico, where she met Porfirio Díaz.

In 1864, Calderón was injured when a bullet hit the left side of her neck, exiting through her mouth. She would often wear a shawl over her face, to cover the scarring.

After being caught in Papantla and imprisoned by imperial troops, she was freed by the troops of Porfirio Díaz after the Taking of Puebla in 1867. She remained in the liberal troops until 1872, when she received a pension from the government. She commanded troops during conflicts in San Juan de los Llanos, San Andrés, Apulco, Huauchinango and in San Juan Aquixtla.

She died in 1917 in the city of Puebla. She was buried in the Municipal Pantheon of Puebla.

== Personal life ==
Calderón was married to Gabino Ortega, who headed the Light Cavalry that formed in Teziutlán with deserters from the French army. Ortega was killed in combat in Tétela del Oro in 1863. Calderón, who was fighting alongside her husband, was forced to abandon his body in order to escape with their weapons.

had several children, all of whom died during the Second French Intervention.

== Legacy ==
A square in Teziuteca, Paseo Altagracia Calderón, is named after her.
