= Elena Amat Calderón =

Spanish archivist, librarian (1910-2006)

Elena Amat Calderón de Wienken (Valencia, 13 January 1910 – Madrid, 4 August 2006) was a Spanish university professor and archivist. She was the first female professor at the Faculty of Geography and History of the Central University of Madrid, now called the Complutense University, where she also worked as a librarian. In addition, she was director of the library of the Ateneo de Madrid between 1941 and 1953, a position she left to become director of the Popular Libraries of Madrid. Throughout her life, she received significant recognition for her work as a librarian and archivist.

== Biography ==
Amat was born in Valencia on 13 January 1910, daughter of writer Francisco de Paula Amat y Villalba, a notable professor of Universal History at the Central University of Madrid and Elena Calderón Martín. Amat completed her teaching studies at the Cardinal Cisneros Institute in Madrid, and graduated in Philosophy and Letters in 1926. In 1927 she obtained a doctorate in History with a thesis on Luisa Roldán titled La Roldana, who was a female 17th-century Sevillian sculptor.

Her work as a teacher began around 1930 at the former Central University (now the Complutense University of Madrid), in the Faculty of Geography and History, as an assistant to the chair of Arabic Archaeology. There she also taught classes in Art History. In 1931, Amat joined the Facultative Corps of Archivists, Librarians and Archaeologists. During her first years in this position, she worked as an archivist in various libraries at the Central University, where she remained until 1939.

In May 1939 she was assigned to the Library of the Ateneo de Madrid, which she had joined between 1926 and 1930. At the Ateneo she was assigned the position of director in 1941, a position she held until 1953. She served as director of the Popular Libraries of Madrid, the origin of the current Libraries of the Community from 1953 until the end of the 1970s.

=== Pioneer in Spanish universities ===
On 8 March 1910, the Royal Order of Public Instruction was published in Spain, which allowed women to pursue university studies of their own free will and without requiring authorization of others. However, classrooms were not opened to female teachers until a few years later. Along with other illustrious figures such as the writer Emilia Pardo Bazán, the philosopher María Zambrano, the teacher María de Maeztu Whitney, the mathematician Carmen Martínez Sancho and the chemist María Teresa Salazar Bermúdez, Elena Amat played a pioneering role in the field of university education as she was the first woman to hold a teaching position in the discipline of Geography and History at the Central University of Madrid.

=== Personal life ===
Amat married Ricardo Suárez Guanes but he died in Paracuellos del Jarama in 1936, during the time of the Spanish Civil War. She later married Carlos Oscar Wieken, with whom she had three daughters, Ana María, Cristina and Elena.

Elena Amat died in Madrid on 4 August 2006.

== Distinctions ==
- Civil Order of Alfonso X the Wise (Ministry of Education, 1953)
- Medal of the Spanish Book Institute (1972)
- The King awarded her the Lady's Ribbon of the Order of Isabella the Catholic (1980)

== Legacy ==
After her death, her daughters donated her personal papers to the Archive of the Ateneo de Madrid. This collection includes personal documentation, such as photographs and letters; or documentary collections such as letters from novelist Cecilia Böhl de Faber to Miguel Velarde (1859–1875), or letters from politician Emilio Castelar to Jerónimo Amat (1857–1870).
