= Adolfo Ruiz Cortines =

President of Mexico from 1952 to 1958

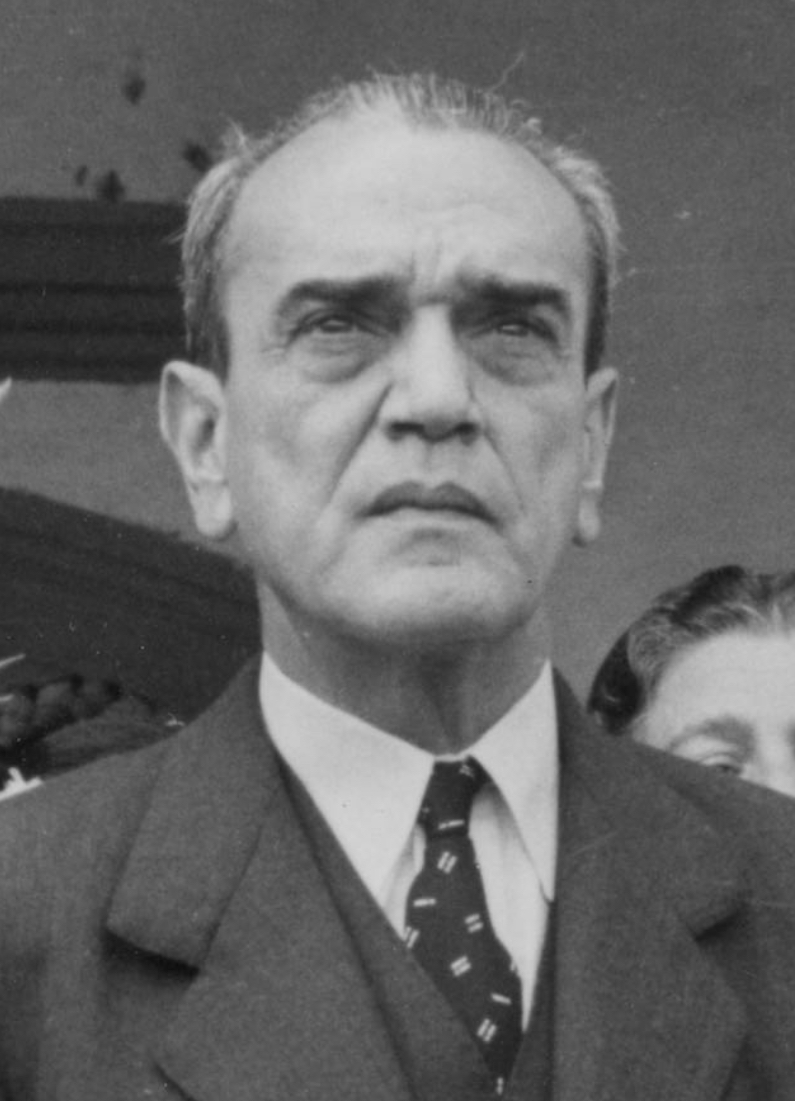
- Ruiz Cortines during his presidency

54th President of Mexico
- In office 1 December 1952 – 30 November 1958
- Preceded by: Miguel Alemán Valdés
- Succeeded by: Adolfo López Mateos

Secretary of the Interior
- In office 30 June 1948 – 30 October 1951
- President: Miguel Alemán Valdés
- Preceded by: Ernesto P. Uruchurtu
- Succeeded by: Ernesto P. Uruchurtu

Governor of Veracruz
- In office 1 December 1944 – 30 June 1948
- Preceded by: Jorge Cerdán Lara
- Succeeded by: Ángel Carvajal Bernal

Member of the Chamber of Deputies for Veracruz's 3rd district
- In office 1 September 1937 – 9 September 1937
- Preceded by: Óscar Fano Viniegra
- Succeeded by: Antonio Pulido

Personal details
- Born: Adolfo Tomás Ruiz Cortines; 30 December 1889 Veracruz, Veracruz, Mexico
- Died: 3 December 1973 (aged 83) Veracruz, Veracruz, Mexico
- Cause of death: Heart failure
- Party: Institutional Revolutionary Party
- Spouses: Lucía Carrillo (m. 1915; div. 1935) María Izaguirre (m. 1941)

Military service
- Allegiance: Mexico
- Branch/service: Mexican Army
- Years of service: 1913–1926
- Rank: Major
- Unit: Revolutionary Forces

Adolfo Tomás Ruiz Cortines (Spanish pronunciation: [aˈðolfo ˈrwis koɾˈtines] 30 December 1889 – 3 December 1973) was a Mexican politician who served as President of Mexico from 1952 to 1958. A member of the Institutional Revolutionary Party (PRI), he previously served as Governor of Veracruz and Secretary of the Interior. During his presidency, which constituted the Mexican Miracle, women gained the right to vote, and he instituted numerous public health, education, infrastructure, and works projects.

A member of the Constitutional Army, Ruiz Cortines was the last Mexican president to have fought in the Mexican Revolution. He worked at the Ministry of Industry and Commerce during the administration of Adolfo de la Huerta and served as an official in the Department of Statistics from 1921 to 1935. Ruiz Cortines joined the Institutional Revolutionary Party and became Senior Official of the Government of the Federal District in 1935 and member of the Chamber of Deputies for Veracruz in 1937. In 1939 he was appointed treasurer of the presidential campaign of Manuel Ávila Camacho and worked as Governor of Veracruz from 1944 to 1948, a position he left to become Secretariat of the Interior during the administration of Miguel Alemán Valdés.

Ruiz Cortines protested as presidential candidate for the Institutional Revolutionary Party in 1951 and was elected a year later, after winning the disputed 1952 elections. During his administration, he put forward a reform to Article 34 of the Constitution, giving women the right to vote, and proposed several infrastructure bills, leading to the creation of the National Housing Institute and the National Nuclear Energy Commission. His social policies included the implementation of aguinaldos. Unlike previous administrations from the PRI, he was an advocate of fiscal austerity. His administration was noted for increased transparency in contrast to his predecessor.

One of Mexico's oldest presidents – he was 62 when he took the oath of office – Ruiz Cortines has been credited with leading a strong economy during the period known as the "Mexican miracle", and has been praised for personal integrity and increasing confidence in the government through his anti-corruption policies. He was criticized for slower implementation of reforms than some of his predecessors. He has been ranked among the most popular Mexican presidents of the 20th century.

== Early life and education ==
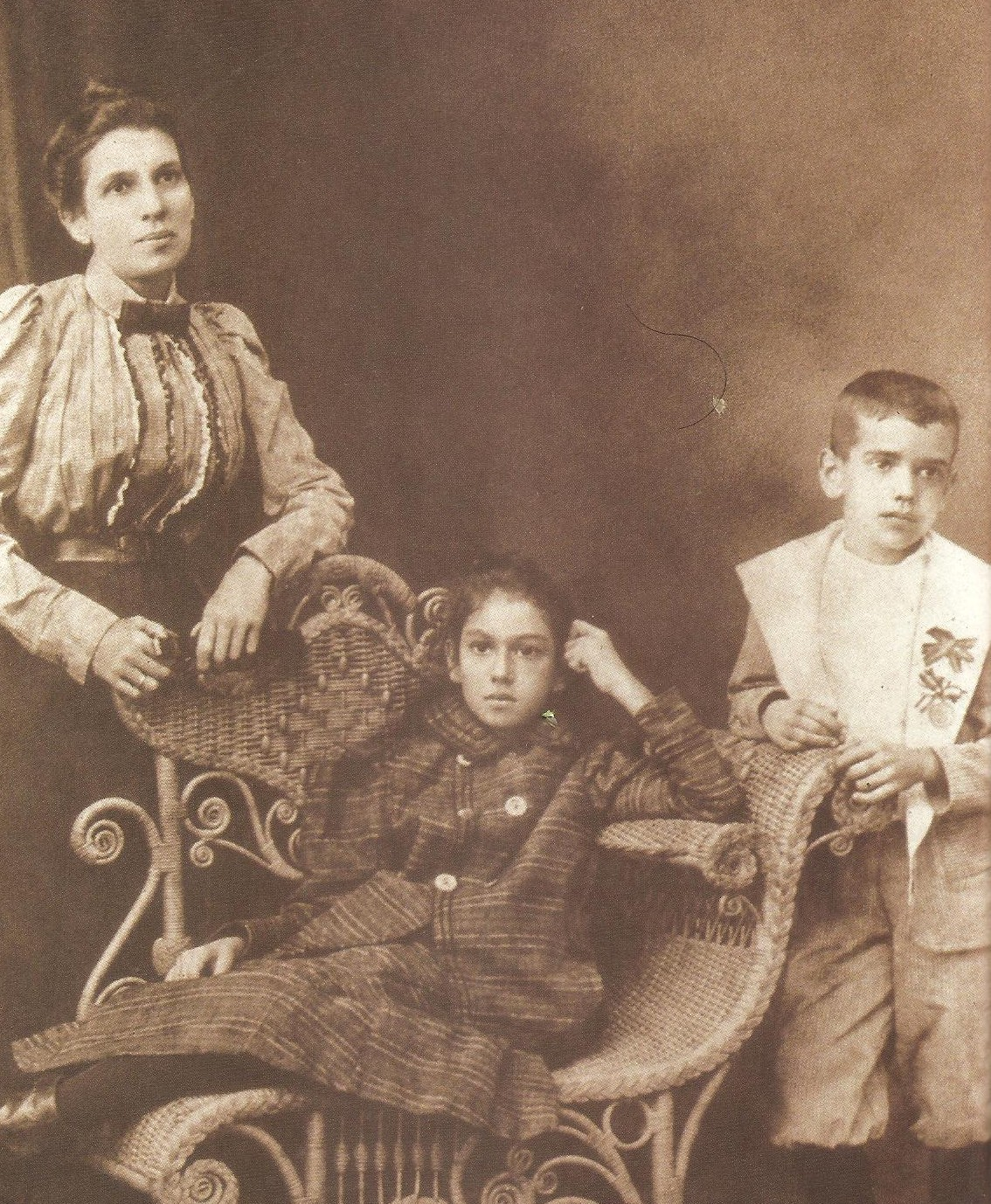
María Cortines Cotera with her children María and Adolfo in a photograph taken in 1895.

Adolfo Tomás Ruiz Cortines was born on 30 December 1889 at 3:00 pm, in the city of Veracruz, into a family of Andalusian descent. His father, Adolfo Ruiz Tejada (1851–1889), regidor of Veracruz during the Porfiriato, died two and a half months prior to his birth. His mother was María Cortines de la Cotera (1859–1932).

Ruiz's grandfather was José Ruiz y Gómez de la Parra, better known as José Ruiz Parra, a member of the State of Veracruz's first Congress in 1824, who co-wrote the state's constitution. José Ruiz Parra was president of the junta that ruled over the Port of Alvarado during the American Invasion of Veracruz, having to personally sign the surrender of the port in 1847. He was also reputed for organizing fundraisers in favor of the Mexican Army during the Second French Intervention, as well as for his deep involvement in the education of the local children. José Ruiz Parra was the maternal grandson of Isidro Gómez de la Parra, subdelegado of the Spanish Crown to the province of Tuxtlas (appointed by Bernardo de Gálvez, viceroy of New Spain), and of his wife Dominga Casado de Toro y Tamariz, herself a descendant of the Luna y Arellano family, holders of the hereditary title of Mariscal de Castilla.

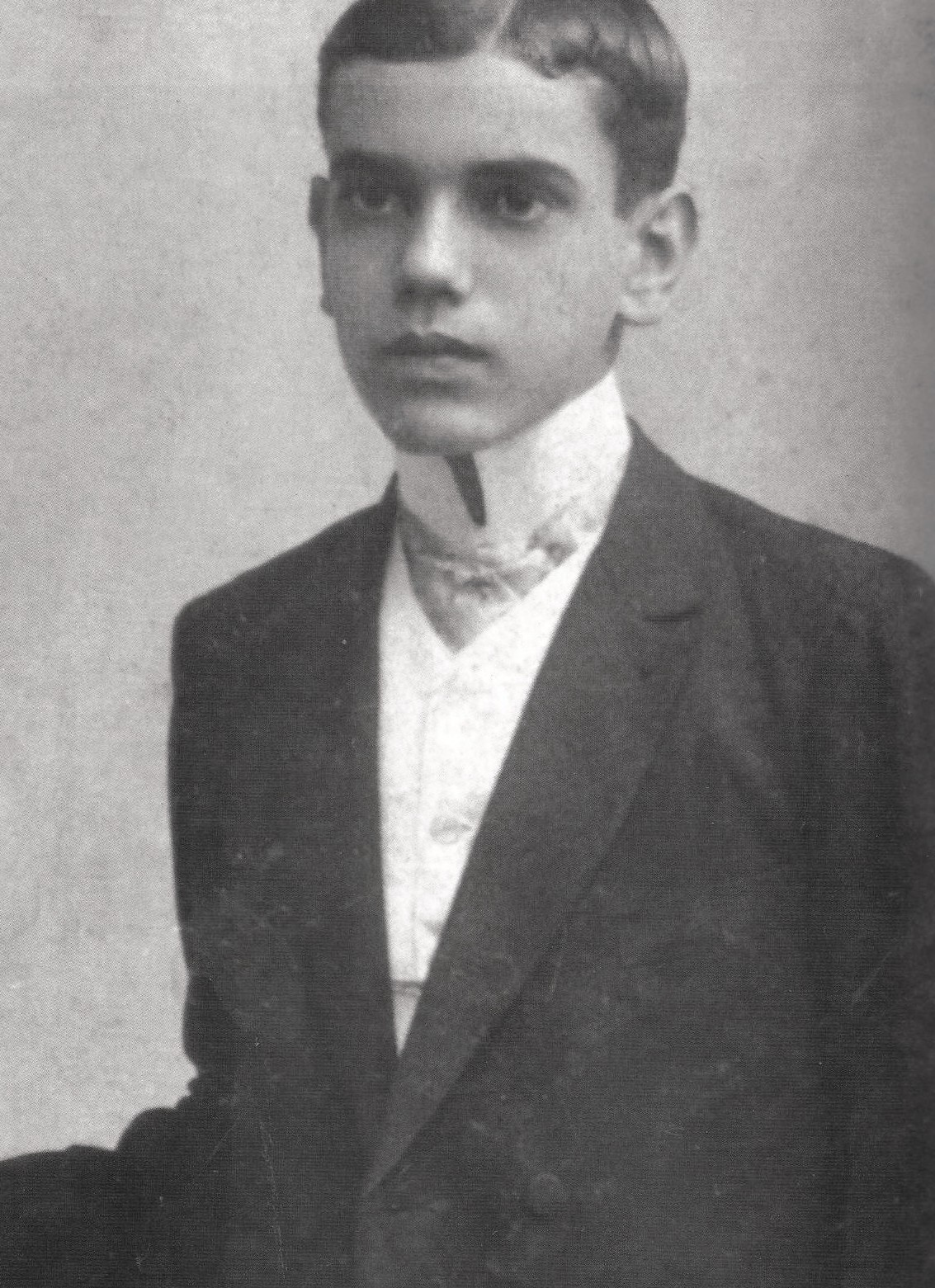
Ruiz Cortines at the age of 10, c. 1899.

Because of his father's premature death, Ruiz Cortines was raised and educated by his mother. María Cortines de la Cotera was the daughter of Diego Francisco Cortines y Gutiérrez de Celis (1829, Bielva, Cantabria, Spain), and María Dolores de la Cotera y Calzada (1824, Veracruz, Mexico), whose father was from Peñarrubia, also in Cantabria. His mother taught him to read and write at the age of 3. Later, he entered a school directed by Joaquín Jerónimo Díaz and Florencio Veyro, called Escuela Amiga, but did his secondary educational studies at the Colegio de los Jesuitas, and at the age twelve, he attended the reputed Instituto Veracruzano, famously directed by the poet Salvador Díaz Mirón. Adolfo learned from his mentors about liberalism, a political principle he would apply during his entire political career. In addition, it was at school where he acquired his fanatical interest in baseball. He always wanted to attend a university, but the American Invasion of 1914 forced him to abandon his studies. His first job was as an accounting assistant at a commercial textile company.

== Military career ==
=== During the Mexican Revolution ===
In 1909, Ruiz read the book La sucesión presidencial de 1910 (The Presidential Succession of 1910) published that year by Francisco I. Madero, the leader of the opposition against President Porfirio Díaz. This book motivated Ruiz's interest in politics. In 1910, the Mexican Revolution started and he became inspired by several of its main players such as Pascual Orozco and Pancho Villa. Because of this influence, in 1912 at the age of 23, he moved to Mexico City. During his stay in Mexico City, President Madero was assassinated and General Victoriano Huerta took power. Since Ruiz Cortines was opposed to the Huerta government, considered by a broad group of Mexicans as a usurper, he volunteered alongside other former students of the Instituto Veracruzano, under the command of Alfredo Robles, a right hand of the leader of the Constitutionalist faction, General Venustiano Carranza. Robles was in charge of the anti-Huerta forces in the south and center of Mexico. Ruiz Cortines did see military action in the Battle of El Ébano, but his main task was as a bookkeeper and paymaster. In 1920, Carranza was attempting to flee the country after his defeat by Sonoran generals Adolfo de la Huerta, Álvaro Obregón, and Plutarco Elías Calles, who rejected Carranza's attempt to impose his successor, and took with him a large amount of the national treasure (150 million pesos in gold). When the generals captured his train and the national treasure's gold, it was the young and trusted officer, Major Adolfo Ruiz Cortines, who received it and delivered it safely and in presence of a notary to General de la Huerta in Mexico City.

=== Post-Revolution and resignation ===
He continued to serve in the army after the revolution ended. In 1926, he requested and was granted retirement.

== Early political career ==
=== Early positions ===
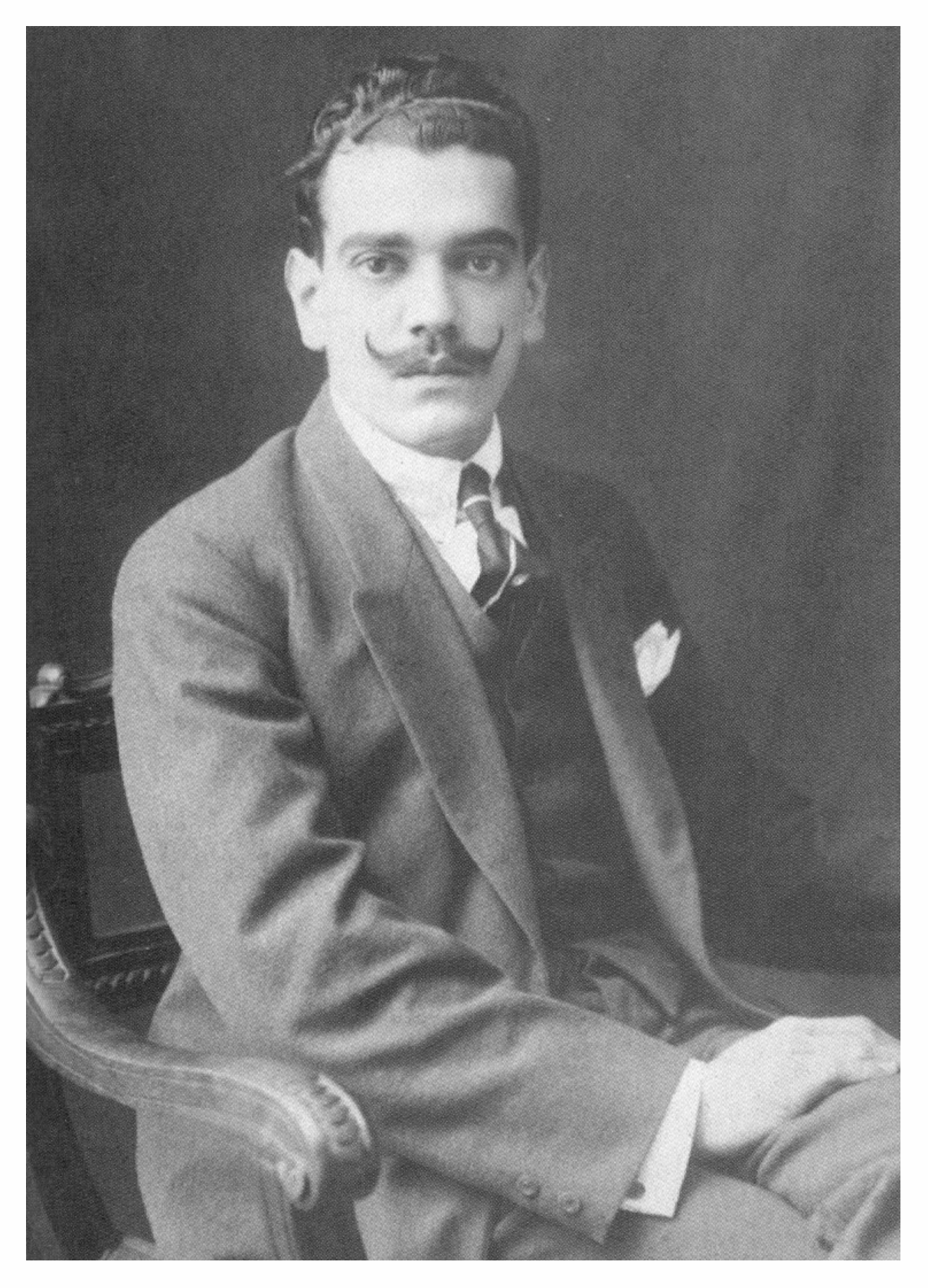
Ruiz Cortines, c.1920s

With his reputation for precise accounting and bookkeeping, a reputation for honesty, and credentials as a veteran of the Mexican Revolution, there were several options open to him in the 1920s. He served in the government's Department of National Statistics. He took classes in statistics from Daniel Cosío Villegas, who was then a young teacher and later an important historian of Mexico. Ruiz Cortines argued in publications that the Department of National Statistics should be an autonomous agency.

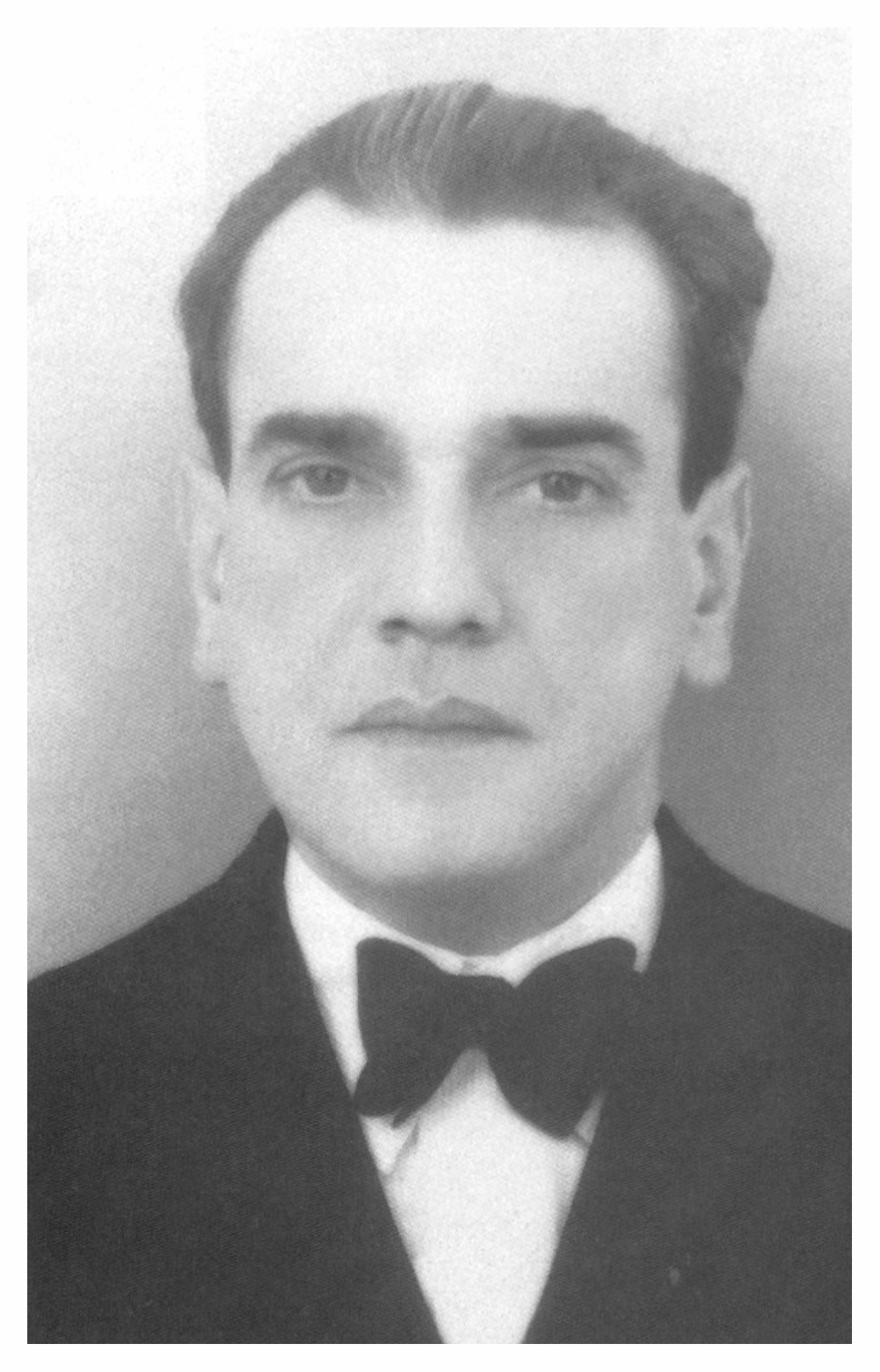
Ruiz Cortines, c.1930s

In 1935 during the presidency of Lázaro Cárdenas, Ruiz Cortines's political career began at age 45, as the director in charge of Mexico City. It was during that time that he met Miguel Alemán Valdés, son of a revolutionary soldier, now a young lawyer who would later become president of Mexico (1946–1952). In 1940, Ruiz Cortines managed the presidential campaign of Cárdenas's choice as successor, Manuel Ávila Camacho. Miguel Alemán asked Ruiz to join him as his undersecretary because of their personal friendship. This position gave Ruiz the opportunity to gain influence within the Institutional Revolutionary Party. After several years, the PRI designated him as candidate for governor of Veracruz.

=== Governor of Veracruz ===
In December 1944, Adolfo Ruiz Cortines became governor of Veracruz. During his administration, he expanded public education in the state. Some of the institutions he founded were the Technical Studies Institute (Departamento para Estudios Técnicos) which provided people with a practical education that allowed them to improve their quality of life. Furthermore, he founded the Institute of Anthropology and the State Planning Committee, among others. He also modified the local constitution to allow women to participate in the local and municipal elections. He built roads and bridges to develop Veracruz's infrastructure since it was one of the main ports of Mexico at that time.

=== Secretary of the Interior ===
On 12 February 1948, Miguel Alemán's Secretary of the Interior, Héctor Pérez Martínez, died in office, and Alemán needed to fill the position. Manuel Ávila Camacho recommended Ruiz Cortines, to which Alemán agreed. It was in this position that Ruiz Cortines distinguished himself and became a contender for the next presidential election.

== 1952 presidential election ==
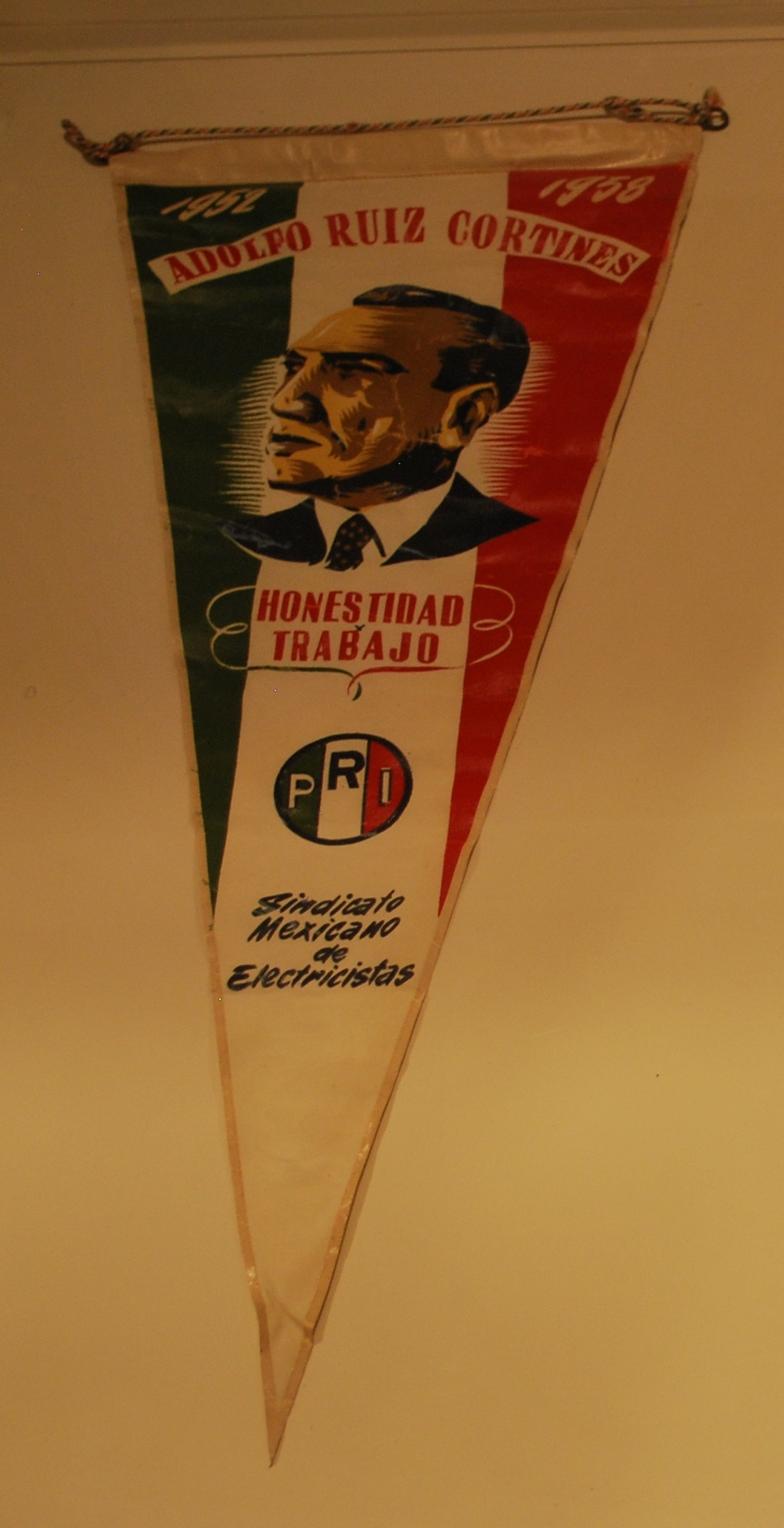
Pennant for Ruiz Cortines's campaign

In 1951, Miguel Alemán Valdés expressed his desire to be allowed to serve a second term, but Lázaro Cárdenas and Manuel Ávila Camacho had former president Abelardo L. Rodríguez tell Alemán Valdés that they didn't think, "extension of the presidential term or re-election is convenient for the country". On 14 October 1951, Ruiz Cortines was named candidate for the presidency by the Institutional Revolutionary Party (PRI) by the incumbent president, as had become practice. The PRI was the dominant party and Ruiz Cortines's electoral victory was entirely expected.

Ruiz Cortines is believed to have been chosen due to his more bland image in contrast to Alemán's more colorful personality, and was not seen as divisive to differin sectors of the PRI. Reportedly, Ruiz Cortines accepted the nomination, but he "apparently did not seek it and certainly did not intrigue to secure it." However, by September, Ruiz Cortines's base of support within the party had grown considerably, and included many young senators such as Adolfo López Mateos and Gustavo Díaz Ordaz. His campaign began on 14 October 1951, with his slogan being "austerity and work" (Spanish: Austeridad y trabajo). His campaign was directed by Rodolfo Sánchez Taboada, the president of the PRI. In one of his first speaking events during his campaign, he stated to around 20,000 women in attendance, "If the vote favors us in the next elections, we intend to initiate before the Chambers the necessary legal reforms so that women enjoy the same political rights as men," a campaign promise he would later fulfill with an amendment to Article 34 of the Constitution.

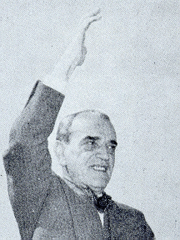
Ruiz Cortines campaigned with the slogan austeridad y trabajo ("austerity and work")

General Miguel Henríquez Guzmán, formerly of the PRI, who had twice before attempted to secure the party's presidential nomination, was the candidate of the Federation of Parties of the Mexican People. His support was in largely urban areas, and included Cárdenas supporters alienated during Alemán Valdés' presidency, established military men, and members of the middle class who desired a multi-party democracy. When asked for his opinion of Ruiz Cortines, Henríquez Guzmán stated:

He would be a candidate to my measure. I have the best concept. I think he is quite a gentleman.

(Spanish: Sería un candidato a mi medida. Lo tengo en el mejor concepto. Creo que es todo un caballero.)

The National Action Party, eventually the PRI's largest political opposition party, first participated in this election, nominating Efraín González Luna. In González Luna's campaign, he addressed social and national problems, including women's suffrage, like Ruiz Cortines. Vicente Lombardo Toledano was the Popular Socialist Party's candidate.

The election took place on 7 July 1952. When the results were announced, it was revealed that Ruiz Cortines won, with 74.31% of the popular vote (2,713,419 votes). Henríquez Guzmán won 15.87% (579,745 votes), González Luna won 7.82% (285,555 votes), and Lombardo Toledano won 1.98% (72,482 votes).

The day after the election, Henríquez Guzmán's supporters gathered in the Alameda Central park in Mexico City to protest reported electoral fraud, including the theft of ballot boxes. The government suppressed the peaceful protests, with an estimated 200 being killed, and more forced disappearances and arrests of people related to the protestors occurring in the following days.

== Presidency (1952–1958) ==
=== Inauguration and cabinet ===

Government of Adolfo Ruiz Cortines
Office	Name	Term
Foreign Affairs	Luis Padilla Nervo	1 December 1952 – 30 November 1958
Public Education	Jaime Torres Bodet	1 December 1952 – 30 November 1958
Finance and Public Credit	Antonio Carrillo Flores	1 December 1952 – 30 November 1958
National Defense	Matías Ramos	1 December 1952 – 30 November 1958
National Assets	José López Lira	1 December 1952 – 30 November 1958
Economy	Gilberto Loyo	1 December 1952 – 30 November 1958
Labor and Social Welfare	Adolfo López Mateos	1 December 1952 – 17 November 1957
Salomón González Blanco	17 November 1957 – 30 November 1958
Health	Ignacio Morones Prieto	1 December 1952 –30 November 1958

On 1 December 1952, he assumed the presidency of the republic, at age 62. In his inaugural address, Ruiz Cortines pledged that fighting corruption in the government and in business would be key aspects of his administration, and that he would continue to maintain close relations with the United States.

Ruiz Cortines modified the law to promote responsibility and honesty among public servants to combat increasing amounts of corruption. He created a law that forced public servants to declare their assets before beginning to work in the government, including himself. Ruiz Cortines's purpose was to compare the public servants' fortune before and after their participation in public charges to combat illicit enrichment and corruption.

Ruiz Cortines's Secretary of the Navy, Sánchez Taboada, died on 1 May 1955 of a myocardial infarction. On 9 May, undersecretary of the Navy Alfonso Poire Ruelas was nominated to succeed Sánchez Taboada, a position which he held until the 22 December of that year. On 1 January 1956, Ruiz Cortines nominated Viceadmiral Roberto Gómez Maqueo to fill the position, and he held it until 1 April 1958. From 1 April to 15 September 1958, Ruiz Cortines's Secretary of the Navy was Héctor Meixuerio Alexandres.

After becoming president, Ruiz Cortines proposed an alliance to Henríquez Guzmán between their parties. Henríquez Guzmán stated he would only accept if political and economic monopolies were ended. Ruiz Cortines rejected this, and repression against the party continued. The government de-registered them in 1954, and in 1955 the party closed their offices.

=== Domestic policy ===
==== Overview ====
After the corruption scandals of the Alemán years, he wanted to give a new image to the government and re-establish its credibility. His credo was "austerity and moralization". He prosecuted several of Alemán's political and business associates who had enriched themselves during the previous administration. He suspended all government contracts in 1953 to cut waste and to root out corruption.

He exercised tight control of public expenditure, supported the construction of roads, railways, dams, schools and hospitals. He also implemented a plan called "March to the Sea", which had the aim of shifting population from the highlands to the coast, and making better use and development of marine and coastal resources. Under this program, malaria was eradicated. He created the Rural Social Welfare Program to improve the living conditions of the rural population and encouraged land distribution. Large foreign estates were expropriated. Furthermore, he implemented the Farm Security program to protect farmers from natural disasters.

At the beginning of his term, President Ruiz Cortines sent a bill to amend Article 34 of the Constitution to grant women equal political rights with men, which granted the vote to Mexican women. To promote measures to meet the need for homes, he created the National Housing Institute. He gave a stimulus to industry, particularly small- and medium-sized, and laid the foundation for the development of the petrochemical industry and promoted the creation of jobs.

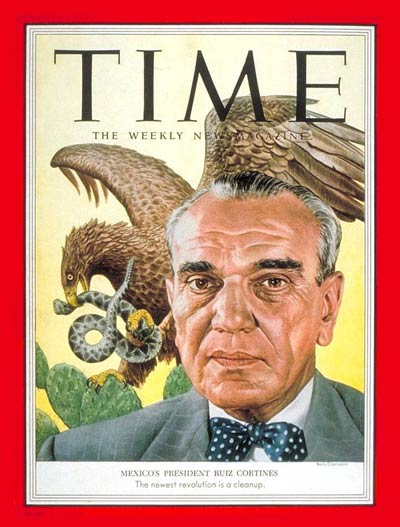
President Ruiz Cortines on the cover of Time magazine in 1953. He was the sixth Mexican president to be featured on the magazine's cover.

In response to the technical advances in the field of nuclear energy, and considering that Mexico could not remain unaffected by this development, he created the National Nuclear Energy Commission. Primary and secondary education were boosted greatly. He specially supported the polytechnic university. Ruiz Cortines equipped the facilities of the National Autonomous University of Mexico (UNAM) and began subsidies to support universities through the republic.

Another primary goal of his government was to improve the health of men and women in Mexico. Therefore, he fought malnutrition among children and promoted an immunization campaign. Ruiz Cortines turned his attention to social problems and imposed an era of austerity on the Mexican government.

Ruiz Cortines's government decided to reduce public spending, to consolidate public finances and fight inflation. These policies led to macroeconomic stability, and contributed to the Mexican economy high growth rates during the 1950s. For first time in many years the Mexican government generated a budget surplus. However, following Ruiz Cortines's 1953 suspension of all government contracts, construction companies were weakened, the national output fell, the foreign trade deficit rose by a third, and almost all employers announced layoffs. He chose to shift away from austerity and reoriented his policy towards boosting production, and announced a record $400 million spending plan to pump into public works projects. In April 1954, in what was known as the crisis de la Semana Santa ("Holy Week crisis"), he had to devaluate the peso from $8.65 per dollar to $12.50 per dollar. Despite the devaluation, in 1955, Mexico's dollar reserves were roughly equivalent to $305 million, the highest since he took office. In December 1955, in a push for a balanced budget, Ruiz Cortines announced the next year's budget, 6,696,374,000 pesos ($535,709,920 in 1955), which was an increase from the previous year, but was still considered somewhat conservative given Mexico's rapidly growing economy.

By the end of his term in 1958, he had faced three social-political conflicts with peasants, teachers and the labor union of the railroad workers.

Mexico's real national income had increased 7% halfway through 1954, and 10% halfway through 1955. In 1954, Mexico's electric power output increased 10%, manufacturing increased 9.8%, and crude-oil production increased 15%. By 1955, Mexico's crop, coffee, and cotton production and yield had increased 20% since the start of Ruiz Cortines's term, at that point an all-time high for Mexico.

==== Austerity and moralization policies ====
In search of a policy that contrasted with the regime of Miguel Alemán Valdés, Ruiz Cortines sought to provide a solution to social problems and initiated a new era of austerity and moralization. The law concerning the responsibility of public servants was modified, indirectly targeting corrupt officials, by proposing that such officials declare their assets before beginning their duties and that the origin of the wealth of those possessing properties exceeding their income could be investigated.

The regulatory law of constitutional article 28 underwent a reform concerning monopolies: people who monopolized basic necessity goods would be punished more severely. During 1953, fines were imposed on merchants for violations of fixed prices on such goods, amounting to 16,242 pesos, reflecting the severity of the Ruiz Cortines government. Shortly thereafter, he ordered the suspension of all payments to government contractors in order to review the status of each project. He reported to the Secretariat of Communications and Transportation the receipt of an invoice regarding a 120-kilometer highway that did not exist; he immediately ordered that the contractor be fined triple the amount he intended to charge.

The Ruiz Cortines government decided to reduce public spending by adjusting it to current revenues, with the purpose of achieving the sanitation of public finances and combating inflation. At that moment, businesspeople were unsettled by the new style of government, fearing that their opportunities for profit would be affected while the Mexican economy was going through a crisis. This fostered uncertainty in private industry and capital flight. In 1953 private investment declined, and Ruiz Cortines redirected his policy toward stimulating production.

==== Women's suffrage ====
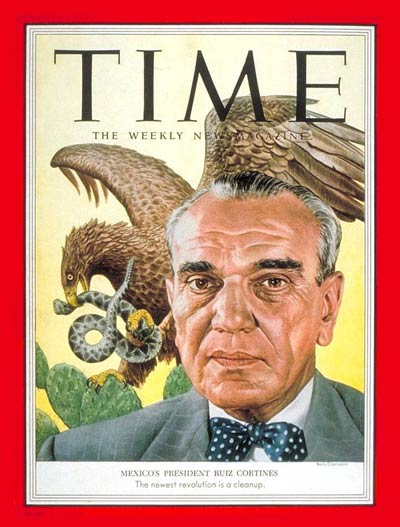
Adolfo Ruiz Cortines on the cover of Time magazine on 14 September 1953 after having been elected president. He was the sixth Mexican president to appear on the cover of the prestigious magazine.

The struggle of women to obtain voting rights and the right to make decisions began around the world several centuries ago. In Mexico, the first manifestations of this occurred between 1884 and 1887, when a magazine written exclusively for women demanded female suffrage. Also during the Mexican Revolution, many women sympathetic to the movement of Francisco I. Madero demanded, without success, their right to vote.

In 1937 President Lázaro Cárdenas requested from the Senate an initiative to reform constitutional article 34 so that women could obtain citizenship. In 1938 the reform was approved by the senators and by the majority of the states. On 24 December 1946, the Chamber of Deputies approved the initiative proposed by Miguel Alemán Valdés, which modified constitutional article 115 so that women could participate in municipal elections under equal conditions with men, with the right to vote and to be elected. The law entered into force on 12 February 1947.

In a speech given as a candidate on 6 April 1952 at Parque 18 de Marzo in Mexico City, Ruiz Cortines promised the 20,000 women in attendance that “if the vote favors us in the coming elections, we propose to initiate before the Chambers the legal reforms necessary for women to enjoy the same political rights as men”.

Already as president, Ruiz Cortines sent his initiative on 9 December 1952; it was immediately and unanimously approved by the Congress of the Union. On 17 October 1953, President Ruiz Cortines fulfilled his promise and promulgated the constitutional reforms that granted women the right to vote in federal elections. That same day, the reform of constitutional article 34 was published in the Official Journal of the Federation:

“Citizens of the Republic are men and women who, having the status of Mexicans, additionally meet the following requirements: having reached 18 years of age if married, or 21 if not, and having an honest way of living.”.

Social activists and intellectuals attended the parliamentary chamber to be present at the historic moment. Among them were Elvia Carrillo Puerto, who fought her entire life to achieve the goal, Adelina Zendejas, Adela Formoso de Obregón Santacilia, María Lavalle Urbina, and Amalia Castillo Ledón. Afterwards, Ruiz Cortines was honored at the Palace of Fine Arts.

For the federal elections of 3 July 1955, in which deputies, senators, and seven governors were to be elected, women went to the polls for the first time. The first to cast her vote was his wife María de los Dolores Izaguirre. The women elected as deputies were Remedios Albertina Ezeta for the State of Mexico; Margarita García Flores for Nuevo León, Guadalupe Ursúa Flores for Jalisco, and Marcelina Galindo Arce for Chiapas.

==== Educational policy ====
During his government, educational institutions were built in various parts of the country and campaigns were carried out to eradicate illiteracy; however, educational backwardness was never resolved. The insufficiency of federal spending on education during his six-year term to coordinate the states and municipalities motivated the creation of the National Technical Council of Education on 26 June 1957.

There were small student demonstrations over the invasion of Guatemala in 1954 in Mexico City. The National Teachers School, the Higher Normal School, and several campuses dependent on the National Polytechnic Institute were closed due to the lack of classrooms and other facilities.

==== Social policy ====
Ruiz Cortines instructed Antonio Ortiz Mena, director of the Mexican Social Security Institute, to extend insurance coverage to all parts of the country and to initiate social security for peasants; he also ordered the proper use of the money allocated to that institution in order to avoid wasteful spending on medical care and medicines. In his first government report, on 1 September 1953, Ruiz Cortines reported that 42% of Mexicans were illiterate, that 19 million peasants lived day to day, and that 60% of the population had an income equivalent to only one fifth of the national income. In the previous ten years, the population had grown by 6 million people.

During his six-year term, Mexico had a population of 32.656 million people, many of whom found no option other than crossing the border as wetbacks, as they were called because many crossed the Rio Grande by swimming. The first year had served to begin the process of honesty and austerity that he had promised in his inaugural speech, in addition to identifying the principal problems and proposing solutions. Beginning in 1954, he would start carrying out major public works.

During his administration, the real wages of workers increased; petroleum works were financed through the issuance of bonds and without incurring foreign debt. By the end of his six-year term in 1958, Ruiz Cortines left a debt of $798 million dollars. National campaigns to eradicate malaria, tuberculosis, and other diseases were highly successful. The implementation throughout the country of civic and moral improvement boards, as he had done during his time as Governor of Veracruz, was well received. His administration encouraged national savings from childhood, founded the Mexican Housing Institute, and established the Investment Commission.

===== CEIMSA =====
In 1956, the reorganized Mexican Export and Import Company S.A. (CEIMSA), founded in 1937 during the administration of Lázaro Cárdenas, resumed operations. It was directed toward the poorest neighborhoods of Mexico City, where trucks arrived loaded with lentils, rice, beans, eggs, and milk; prices were between 30 and 40% lower than in commercial establishments. During the time CEIMSA operated, many families benefited from the offers of basic products that they could purchase at low prices.

Ruiz Cortines's program was affected by corruption. The same people from the neighborhoods to whom CEIMSA trucks distributed goods were in collusion with the official distributors. The company operated under the same name until 1962, when the purposes of CEIMSA were resumed by President López Mateos, leading to the creation of CONASUPO.

=== Economy and finances ===
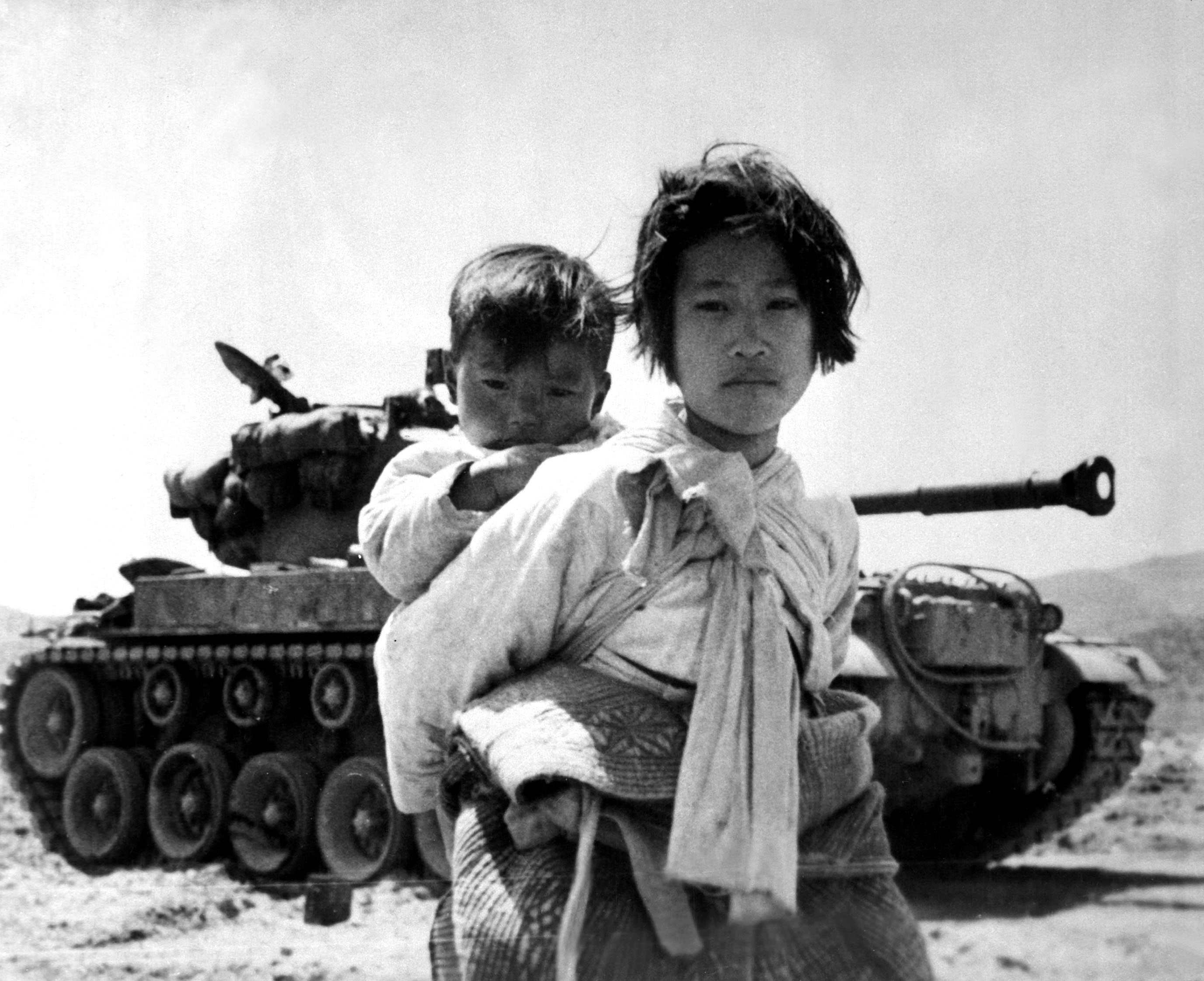
The problems in the Mexican economy became evident at the end of the Korean War in 1953, as world demand declined and international prices of raw materials fell.

At the beginning of his presidential term, Ruiz Cortines faced an economy immersed in inflation, originating in the previous six-year administrations, which had not been eradicated despite the continuous economic growth that had begun in 1950.

Businessmen decided to limit their investments in Mexico, a fact that aggravated the problem because the GDP was reduced and almost came to a standstill in 1952.

After a decade of continuous growth, the national economy had reached a crisis. For this reason, Ruiz Cortines implemented a "Stabilizing Policy" whose objective was to stop the rapid increase in the cost of living and prevent domestic demand from continuing to decline, factors that affected industrial growth.

To put the "Stabilizing Policy" into practice, Ruiz Cortines implemented the Emergency Agricultural Plan. It was presented on 11 December 1952 by Gilberto Flores Muñoz, Secretary of Agriculture and Livestock, and entered into operation in January 1953. The plan was specifically aimed at:

- Increasing the production of basic food crops such as maize, wheat, and beans.
- Channeling a greater number of credits from private banking toward the rural sector.
- Applying modern procedures aimed at better use of properties.

The importance of food imports was fundamental in the fight against the 6.9% inflation that existed during his six-year term.

Price controls during his administration were managed by the General Directorate of Prices, responsible for setting prices and ensuring that merchants respected them; and by the Secretariat of the Interior, which was dedicated to eradicating hoarding and monopoly.

Beginning in 1953, the government intensified the promotion of agricultural production by improving guaranteed prices for maize and beans, expanding budget allocations to implement irrigation systems, which allowed the proper use of natural resources and the provision of supplies to producers.

==== Peso devaluation, 1954 ====
During Holy Week of 1954, on 17 April, Ruiz Cortines devalued the peso from $8.50 to $12.50 per dollar. The new parity was undervalued, but the president said that he "did not want to spend the entire six-year term devaluing". The next devaluation would not occur until 1976. The government decided to devalue during Holy Week because banks would remain closed and thus uncontrolled purchases of dollars would be avoided.

==== Promotion of industry ====
Ruiz Cortines gave a major boost to industry, just as had occurred in previous administrations. In 1954, 20.2% of the budget for the parastatal sector was allocated to it; tax facilities were granted to private companies, which allowed considerable increases in extensions and taxes, reducing the ISR and other less significant subsidies. In addition, it was established that taxes would not be paid on salaries of $300 pesos per month, with the aim of improving the income of buyers of Mexican products.

With the policy of promoting industry, the government of Ruiz Cortines succeeded in ending the inflationary spiral, allowing Mexico to enter the stage of "stabilizing development", a triumph that caused great surprise internationally and was considered the "Mexican miracle." The economic situation began to change negatively toward the end of 1956 because, together with foreign direct investment, speculative capital had entered. As a result, the last year of the six-year term was characterized by demonstrations by the working classes over the high cost of living.

==== The March to the Sea ====
Ruiz Cortines considered, based on his experience in demographics and statistics, that Mexico had the advantage of its two extensive coastlines, such that the population could be redistributed if tourist, cabotage, and fishing ports were better developed. For this reason, Ruiz Cortines implemented the Maritime Progress Program, to which $750 million pesos were allocated during his six-year term, and which publicity summarized as "The March to the Sea". For the 10,000 kilometers of coastline possessed by Mexico, 70 ports were identified with the aim of improving them or constructing them from the beginning; links were established from the Mexican Plateau to the coasts and interoceanic communications.

=== Sociopolitical conflicts ===
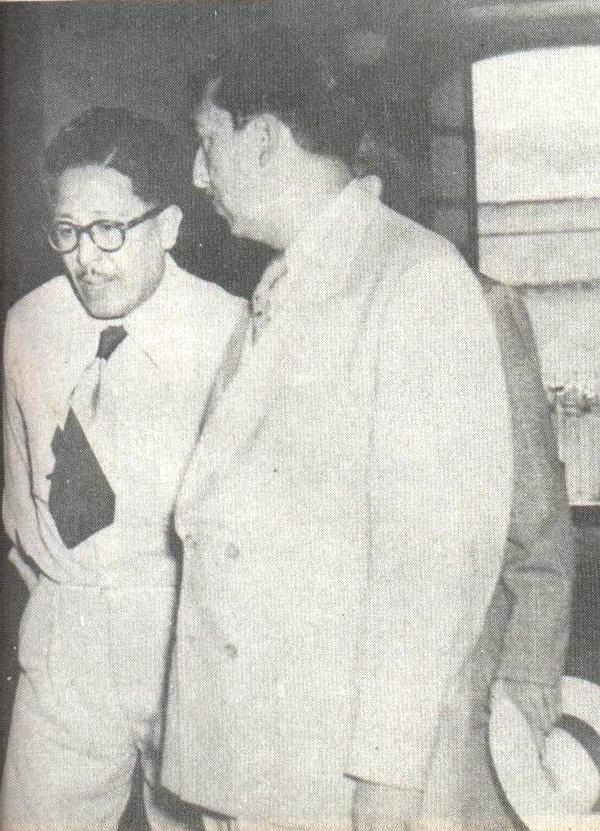
During the six-year term of Ruiz Cortines, several governors of different states of the country were opposed to him because they disliked the form of government he had implemented. One of the governors who was removed from office during his administration was the Governor of Guerrero Alejandro Gómez Maganda, a close friend of former president Miguel Alemán Valdés.

The leaders of the PRI collaborated in the dissolution of the Henriquista movement, which took place in February 1954. Several states disagreed with his government, which is why Ruiz Cortines imposed discipline to remove dissidents: the Governor of Yucatán Tomás Marentes Miranda resigned from office on 15 June 1953 and the governor of Guerrero Alejandro Gómez Maganda did the same on 20 May 1954. On 22 March 1955, Manuel Bartlett Bautista resigned from his post as Governor of Tabasco; on 9 August of the same year, Ruiz Cortines demanded the resignation of the governor of Chihuahua, Óscar Soto Maynez. Another opposition governor was that of the state of Oaxaca, General Manuel Cabrera Carrasqueado, who died of a heart condition on 1 October 1955. By the end of the six-year term, as Krauze says, Ruiz Cortines had "twenty-eight loyal governors out of twenty-nine possible."

In April 1952 the Revolutionary Confederation of Workers and Peasants was created, an association affiliated with the PRI, which soon entered into dispute with the CTM. In an attempt to achieve workers' unity, the government promoted the formation of the Workers' Unity Bloc, which for a time succeeded in grouping together federations and unions with differences among them.

Generals Marcelino García Barragán, Miguel Henríquez Guzmán, Celestino Gasca and Francisco J. Múgica maintained a distant relationship with the government of Ruiz Cortines because, in addition to being dissatisfied with his administration, they had the idea of taking up arms again. Ruiz Cortines took severe measures with some military figures: he dissolved the Federation of Parties of the Mexican People, to which the generals were affiliated; they were expelled from the PRI and discharged from the Mexican Army.

During his administration, the proportion of the budget allocated to the army was reduced from 9.7 to 8%. Other old generals of the Mexican Revolution, such as Jacinto B. Treviño and Juan G. Barragán, allied to form the Authentic Party of the Mexican Revolution. Ruiz Cortines facilitated their registration, personally granting it to them.

==== Agrarian problem ====
At the beginning of 1958, dissatisfied laborers and peasants in the north of the country began a period of invasions of private latifundia.

In Sinaloa, Baja California, Sonora and the Comarca Lagunera; thousands of peasants invaded private lands to expose the latifundia, with cases in which some invaders were forced to abandon the land by force. In the state of Sonora, the government expropriated the American latifundium of Cananea, which consisted of an area of half a million hectares. In this place, as in others where latifundism was explicit, Ruiz Cortines ordered the expropriation of the lands by decree issued on 21 August and proceeded to distribute them immediately. The police and the army repressed and imprisoned the leaders of the invasions, resolving the peasant conflict in this manner.

==== Teachers' strike ====
Many of the teachers of Section IX of the National Union of Education Workers disagreed with the direction their union had taken, which is why they organized a rebellion led by the teachers Othón Salazar and José Encarnación Pérez Rivero. In July 1956, the teachers' guild began a mobilization throughout the country demanding a salary increase because they refused to accept the poor raise offered by the president of the SNTE, Manuel Sánchez Vite.

The SNTE separated from the union controlled by the CTM and created the Revolutionary Teachers' Movement. Taking advantage of the approaching presidential elections, mobilization began in 1958 in search of salary improvements and recognition of the MRM within the SNTE.

The teachers, led by Othón Salazar, occupied the building of the Secretariat of Public Education for several months. Ruiz Cortines, following the advice of his wife, decided to give the order that any person who left would not be allowed back in. They had not been able to evict them earlier because the teachers entered and left freely.

With the large demonstration held in the Plaza de la Constitución in April 1958, the government sent the police of the Federal District and riot police to repress the dissidents and imprison their leaders. Othón Salazar was imprisoned in the Lecumberri prison. Since public opinion sided with the teachers, on the occasion of the celebration of Teacher's Day, Ruiz Cortines granted the social improvements demanded by Section IX of the National Union of Education Workers on 15 May 1958.

==== Railroad movement ====
The railroad movement was the most important during his administration. Workers were tired of the repressive methods that Jesús Díaz de León, secretary general of the Railroad Workers' Union of the Mexican Republic, implemented to repress any opposition and because their salaries had decreased by 1.35% during the six-year term from 1951 to 1957.

In 1958, dissatisfied railroad workers created the Great Wage Commission, in which the representative of Section XII of the National Union of Workers of petroleum, Demetrio Vallejo, began to stand out. The Commission clashed with the Executive Committee of the union, since while the latter demanded a salary increase of $200 pesos, the opposition demanded $350. In the end, the government of Ruiz Cortines decided to grant a raise of $215 pesos; the Great Commission and the Executive Committee agreed to accept it.

Ruiz Cortines resolved the problem temporarily on Wednesday, 2 July 1958; acceding to some workers' demands and dealing with labor pressure. The problem would be inherited by his successor, Adolfo López Mateos, who would have to deal with the 1959 Mexican railroad strike.

=== Earthquake of 1957 ===
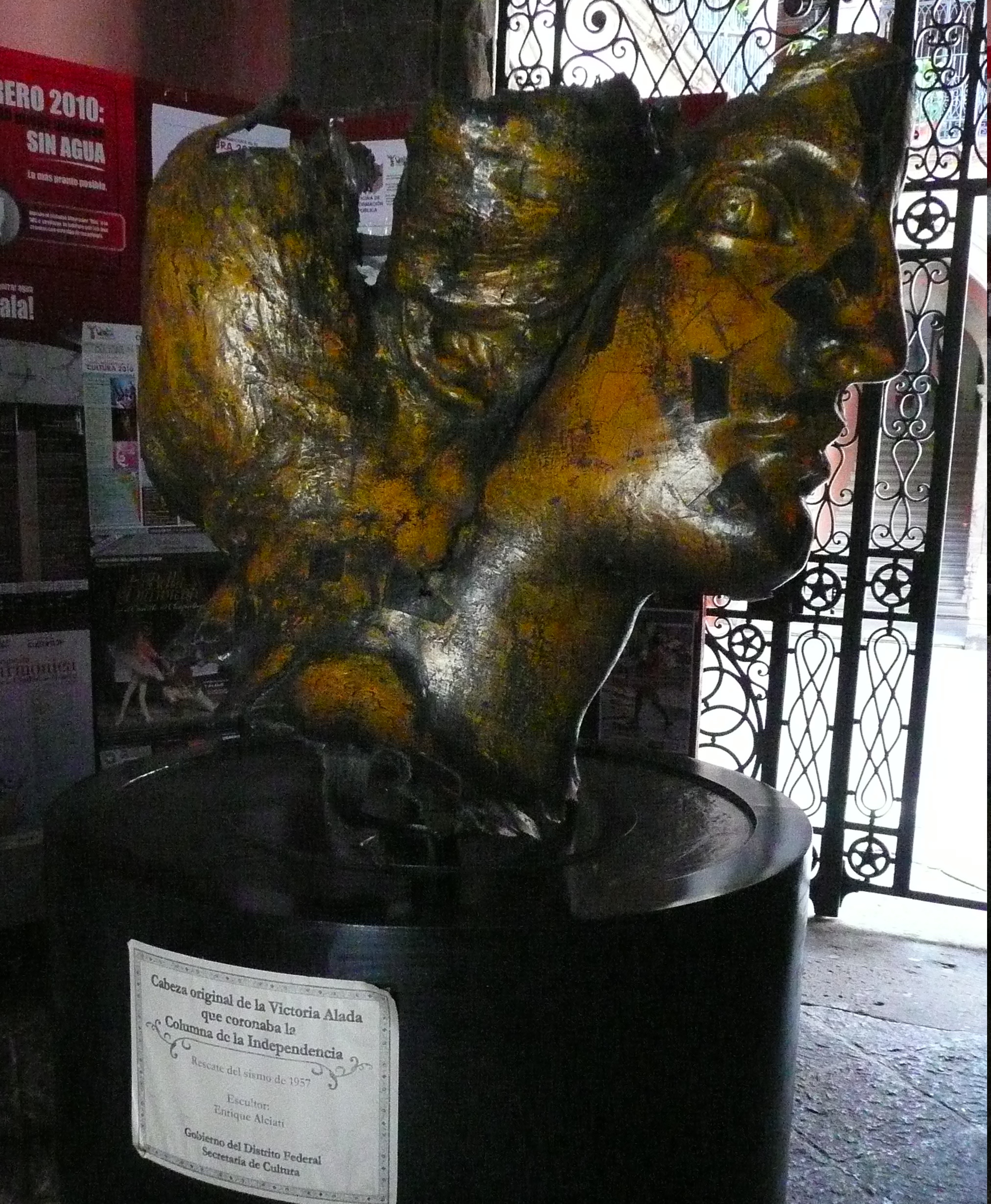
In 1957, an earthquake struck Mexico City and the Angel of Independence was toppled and destroyed at its base, so Ruiz Cortines ordered its immediate restoration.

At 2:44 in the morning on 28 July 1957, an earthquake with epicenter in the state of Guerrero shook Mexico City for about 90 seconds. It measured 7.7 on the Richter scale. Ruiz Cortines was in his office in the national palace at the time.

The Angel of Independence collapsed, as did some buildings such as the Rioma building, located on Insurgentes Avenue. Other buildings were seriously damaged and the authorities ordered their demolition. The disaster left a toll of 52 dead and 657 injured. That same day, the Seismological Observatory of Mexico City recorded thirty aftershocks of varying magnitudes.

From three in the morning, Ruiz Cortines ordered that assistance be rapidly provided to the victims. Uruchurtu and Ruiz Cortines toured the city to assess the damage; they ordered unstable buildings evacuated and instructed the police chief and the commander of the presidential guards to help those affected. Personnel from the Secretariats of Health, the Interior, and Communications received orders to assist victims in other parts of the country. The following day, civilians, members of the Mexican Army, the Red Cross, the fire department, and police collaborated with the authorities to quickly assist the victims.

=== Foreign relations ===
During Ruiz' Cortines's term, Mexico had cold diplomatic relationships with the United States because Ruiz Cortines refused to make any agreements that committed Mexico to participate in international wars. During his term, Ruiz Cortines completed the construction of projects like Falcon Dam, built with 58.6% American funds and 41.4% Mexican funds. The dam on the Rio Grande (Río Bravo in Mexico) was inaugurated on October 19, 1953, by Ruiz Cortines and United States President Dwight D. Eisenhower.

In 1956, Ruiz Cortines attended a meeting with US President Eisenhower and Canadian Prime Minister Louis St. Laurent of Canada. During the meeting, the leaders discussed immigration issues, economic cooperation, civil aviation and illegal fishing in coastal areas. In general, President Ruiz Cortines's foreign policy was conservative and respectful of the sovereignty of other nations. His administration was looking for a closer relationship with Latin America and sought the integration into the institutional system of Latin America, the Organization of American States (OAS). In the Conference of Caracas, held in 1954, Mexico failed in its attempt to defend the self-determination of the people.

In total, Ruiz Cortines only made three foreign visits during his term, which was deliberately a small amount, as he did not want to waste money on planes or waste time on boats.

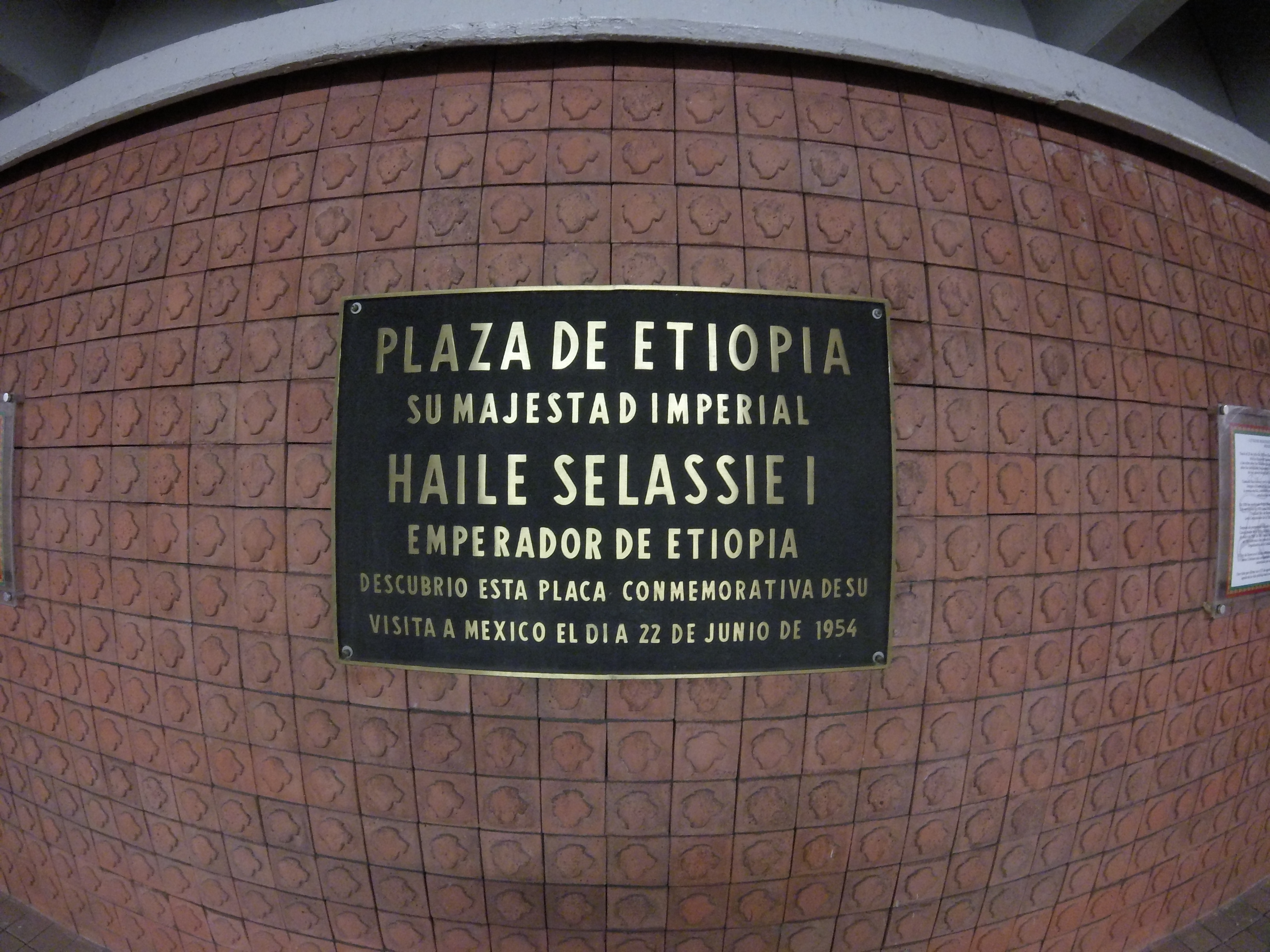
The plaque that Haile Selassie inaugurated in Mexico City

In 1935, under Lázaro Cárdenas, Mexico was one of only five countries to condemn Fascist Italy's invasion of Ethiopia (then the Ethiopian Empire or Abyssinia) during the Second Italo-Ethiopian War. In 1953, Ruiz Cortines invited Haile Selassie, the Emperor of Ethiopia, to visit Mexico, who used the opportunity to thank Mexico for condemning the invasion against him. In 1955, Selassie accepted the invitation, and inaugurated at plaque in Mexico City with his country's name on it. He inaugurated a plaque with Mexico's name on it in his country's capital in 1958.

==== Official international trips ====
This is a list of official trips abroad made by Ruiz Cortines during his presidency.

According to Article 88 of the Constitution of Mexico, the president may leave the country for up to seven days by informing the Senate or, where applicable, the Permanent Commission in advance of the reasons for the absence, as well as of the results of the measures carried out. For absences longer than seven days, permission from the Senate or the Permanent Commission is required.

Date	Destination	Main purpose
1953
19 October	Laredo (United States)	Ceremony for the inauguration of the Falcon Dam with President of the United States Dwight D. Eisenhower.
1956
26–28 March	White Sulphur Springs (United States)	Working meeting with President of the United States Dwight D. Eisenhower and Prime Minister of Canada Louis St. Laurent. During the meeting, the three leaders discussed migration issues, Mexican cotton sales to the United States, economic cooperation from the Eximbank, the development of civil aviation, and illegal fishing off the coasts.
21–24 July	Panama City (Panama)	Participation in the first Summit of the Organization of American States Heads of State and Government.

=== 1958 presidential succession ===
In 1957, Ruiz Cortines, as was tradition, was to announce the PRI's next presidential candidate. Taking input from ex-presidents Lázaro Cárdenas and Miguel Alemán Valdés, each symbolizing the left and right sectors of the PRI respectively, he announced his hard-working but little-known Labor Minister Adolfo López Mateos as the next candidate, with international observers seeing López Mateos as the sure winner despite his relative obscurity. López Mateos eventually won the election with 90% of the popular vote.

== Post-presidency ==
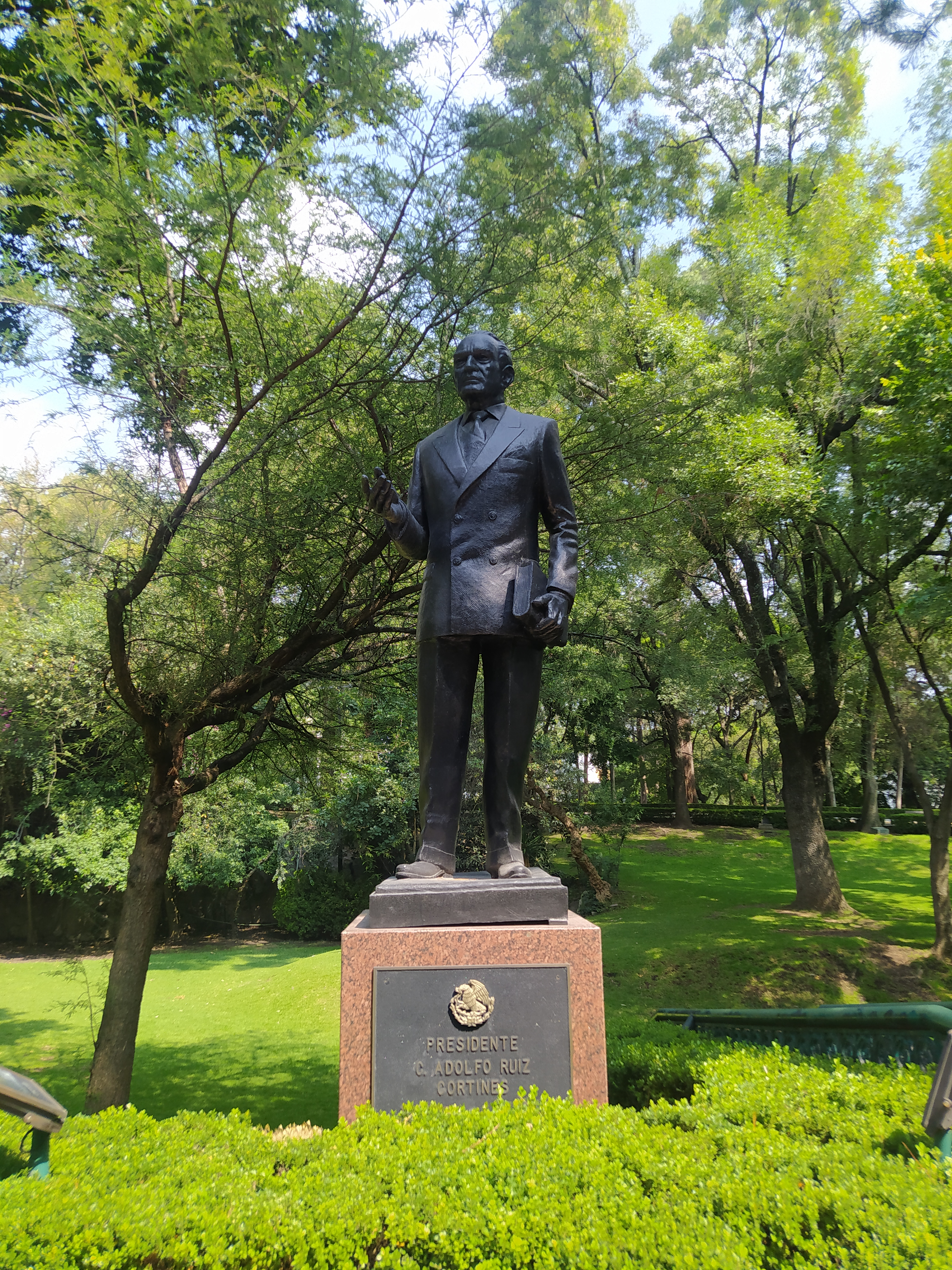
Statue of Ruiz Cortines in Los Pinos, Mexico City

On 1 December 1958, Ruiz handed over power to his successor López Mateos, and then he retired from public life almost altogether. In 1964, he attended the inauguration of López Mateos' successor, President Gustavo Díaz Ordaz.

According to Miguel Alemán Velasco, President Luis Echeverría once consulted Ruiz Cortines via telephone on an unspecified policy. Ruiz Cortines disagreed with Echeverría's idea, but Echeverría didn't take his advice.

In his last days, his friend Manuel Caldelas García, a politician whom he had known in his youth, began living with him at his home in Veracruz. Caldelas helped with household chores and took care of the former president. On the afternoon of 3 December 1973, the health status of Ruiz Cortines became critical. Dr. Mario Díaz Tejeda went to the home to treat the condition of the former president. When the drugs took effect on him, Ruiz Cortines fell asleep. At 9:05 am on Monday, 3 December 1973, Adolfo Tomás Ruiz Cortines died at 83 years of age, a victim of heart failure caused by arteriosclerosis.

== Personal life ==
In 1915 he married his first wife, Lucía Carrillo Guitiérrez, the daughter of Veracruz's then-governor, Lauro Carrillo. Ruiz Cortines and Lucía later divorced. Their first child, María Cristina Ruiz Carrillo, was born on 6 December 1917. Their second child, Lucía Ruiz Carrillo, was born on 1 May 1919. Their third child, Adolfo Ruiz Carrillo, was born on 28 November 1922.

He married his second wife, an old girlfriend named María de Dolores Izaguirre, in 1941, who would serve as his first lady. She became the first woman in Mexico to cast a vote after her husband passed the constitutional amendment promised during his campaign.

Ruiz Cortines was known to frequently play domino games.

== See also ==
- List of heads of state of Mexico
- Mexican Miracle

Chamber of Deputies (Mexico)
Preceded by Óscar Fano Viniegra	Member of the Chamber of Deputies for Veracruz's 3rd district 1937	Succeeded by Antonio Pulido
Political offices
Preceded by Jorge Cerdán Lara	Governor of Veracruz; 1944–1948	Succeeded by Ángel Carvajal Bernal
Preceded by Ernesto P. Uruchurtu	Secretary of the Interior; 1948–1951	Succeeded by Ernesto P. Uruchurtu
Preceded by Miguel Alemán Valdés	President of Mexico; 1952–1958	Succeeded by Adolfo López Mateos
Party political offices
Preceded by Miguel Alemán Valdés	PRI nominee for President of Mexico; 1952	Succeeded by Adolfo López Mateos
