= Mexican miracle =

Term for Mexico's economic growth, 1954–1970

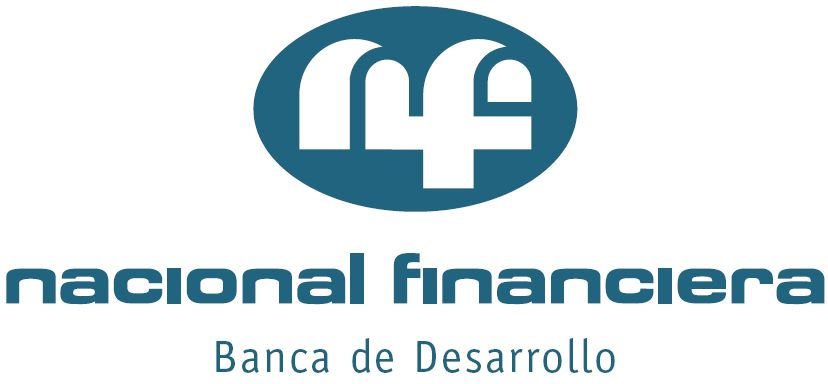
Logo of Nacional Financiera (NAFIN), the state development bank.

The Mexican miracle (Spanish: Milagro mexicano) is a term used to refer to the country's inward-looking development strategy that produced sustained economic growth. It is considered to be a golden age in Mexico's economy in which the Mexican economy grew 6.8% each year. It was a stabilizing economic plan which caused an average growth of 6.8% and industrial production to increase by 8% with inflation staying at only 2.5%. Beginning roughly in the 1940s, the Mexican government would begin to roll out the economic plan that they would call "the Mexican miracle", which would spark an economic boom beginning in 1954 spanning some 15 years and would last until 1970. In Mexico, the Spanish economic term used is "desarrollo estabilizador", or "stabilizing development".

== Conditions for sustained growth ==
An important factor helping sustained growth in the period 1940–1970 was the reduction of political turmoil, particularly around national elections, with the creation of a single, dominant party. In 1926, the party founded by Plutarco Elías Calles in the wake of President-elect Álvaro Obregón's assassination in 1928 changed its name to the Institutional Revolutionary Party. With the party's presidential choice in 1946, Miguel Alemán Valdés, Mexico elected its first civilian president since Francisco I. Madero in 1911. With the subsequent elections of Adolfo Ruiz Cortines (1952–58), Adolfo López Mateos (1958–64), and Gustavo Díaz Ordaz (1964–70), there were no political opposition challenges to the government's implementation of economic programs.

During the presidency of Lázaro Cárdenas, there were significant policies in the social and political spheres that had impacts on future economic policies in Mexico, in particular nationalization of oil in 1938, as well as land reform, and nationalization of railways. Cárdenas was succeeded by the politically more moderate Manuel Ávila Camacho, who initiated a program of industrialization in early 1941 with the Law of Manufacturing Industries. One scholar has called the inaugural date of this law "the birthday of the Institutional Revolution", since it was the inception of import substitution industrialization. Further legislation in 1946 under President Miguel Alemán Valdés, the Law for Development of New and Necessary Industries, was passed.

"In the long view, some of the permanent alterations in Mexico from World War II were economic." Mexico benefited significantly during World War II, by its participation on the side of the Allies. Mexico supplied labor to the U.S. via the Bracero Program, but its most significant contribution was in its supply of material to fight the war. It received cash payments for its material contributions, which meant that following the war the Mexican treasury had robust reserves. Although a participant in the war, like the U.S., Mexico was not a site of combat, so that in the post-war era, Mexico did not need to rebuild damaged infrastructure. However, with the resources available following the war, Mexico embarked on big infrastructure projects.

Ávila Camacho used part of the accumulated savings to pay off foreign debts, so that Mexico's credit standing substantially improved (increasing investors' confidence in the government). With increased revenues coming from the war effort, the government was now in a position to distribute material benefits from the Revolution more widely; he used funds to subsidize food imports that especially affected urban workers. Workers in Mexico received higher salaries during the war, but there was a lack of consumer goods to purchase, so that workers had both personal savings and pent up demand for goods. A key government institution for development, founded under Lázaro Cárdenas's administration was Nacional Financiera (abbreviated Nafin), the national development bank, which funded the expansion of the industrial sector.

Growth was sustained by the government's increasing commitment to primary education for the general population from the late 1920s through the 1940s. The enrollment rates of the country's youth increased threefold during this period; consequently when this generation was employed by the 1940s their economic output was more productive. Mexico also made investments in higher education that created a generation of scientists, social scientists, and engineers, who enabled Mexican industrial innovation. The founding of the Instituto Politécnico Nacional (IPN) in 1936 as a government-funded institution in the northern part of Mexico City, trained a new generation of Mexicans. In northern Mexico, the Monterrey Institute of Technology and Higher Education, known in Mexico as the Tec de Monterrey, was founded by northern industrialists in 1942, with the programs designed by a former faculty member of the IPN and modeled after the Massachusetts Institute of Technology. From a small, private inception, the Tec de Monterrey built a major campus inaugurated by President Alemán in 1946, and has been a magnet for students from other areas of Latin America.

=== Import-substitution program and infrastructure projects ===
In the years following World War II, President Miguel Alemán Valdés (1946–52) instituted a full-scale import-substitution program which stimulated output by boosting internal demand. The government raised import controls on consumer goods but relaxed them on capital goods (such as machinery for Mexican production of consumer goods), which it purchased with international reserves accumulated during the war. The government spent heavily on infrastructure, including major dam projects to produce hydroelectric power, supply drinking water to cities and irrigation water to agriculture, and control flooding. By 1950 Mexico's road network had expanded to 21,000 kilometers, of which some 13,600 were paved.

The economic stability of the country, high credit rating allowing borrowing, an increasingly educated work force, and savings allowing purchase of consumer goods were excellent conditions for the government's program of import substitution industrialization. Finished goods previously purchased abroad could be produced domestically with the purchase of machinery. One successful industry was textile production. Foreign transnational companies established branches in Mexico, such as Coca-Cola, Pepsi-Cola, and Sears (Mexico) under Mexican laws regulating foreign investment. The automotive industry in Mexico had already been established shortly after the end of the military phase of the Mexican Revolution, with Buick and Ford Motor Company bringing production to Mexico in 1921 and 1925 respectively. With a growing middle class consumer market for such expensive consumer goods, the industrial base of Mexico expanded to meet the demand.

The government fostered the development of consumer goods industries directed toward domestic markets by imposing high protective tariffs and other barriers to imports. The share of imports subject to licensing requirements rose from 28 percent in 1956 to an average of more than 60 percent during the 1960s and about 70 percent in the 1970s. Industry accounted for 22 percent of total output in 1950, 24 percent in 1960, and 29 percent in 1970. The share of total output arising from agriculture and other primary activities declined during the same period, while services stayed constant.

The government promoted industrial expansion through public investment in agricultural, energy, and transportation infrastructure. Cities grew rapidly during these years, reflecting the shift of employment from agriculture to industry and services. The urban population increased at a high rate after 1940. Growth of the urban labor force exceeded even the growth rate of industrial employment, with surplus workers taking low-paying service jobs.

=== Economic performance ===
Mexico's strong economic performance continued into the 1960s, when GDP growth averaged about 7 percent overall and about 3 percent per capita. Consumer price inflation averaged only 3 percent annually. Manufacturing remained the country's dominant growth sector, expanding 7 percent annually and attracting considerable foreign investment.

Mining grew at an annual rate of nearly 4 percent, trade at 6 percent, and agriculture at 3 percent. By 1970 Mexico had diversified its export base and become largely self-sufficient in food crops, steel, and most consumer goods. Although its imports remained high, most were capital goods used to expand domestic production.

== See also ==
- Economic history of Mexico
- Economy of Mexico
- La Década Perdida
- Tourism in Mexico
