= José López Lira =

Mexican lawyer and politician

José López Lira (1892–1965) was a Mexican lawyer and politician. He served in the cabinet of Adolfo Ruiz Cortines as the Secretary of National Assets and Administrative Inspection (Spanish: Secretaría de Bienes Nacionales e Inspección Administrativa).
