= Gilberto Loyo =

Mexican politician

Gilberto Loyo González (4 February 1901 – 10 April 1973) was a Mexican economist and politician. He was a member of the Institutional Revolutionary Party and Secretary of Industry and Commerce under President Adolfo Ruiz Cortines.
