= Miguel Alemán Valdés =

President of Mexico from 1946 to 1952

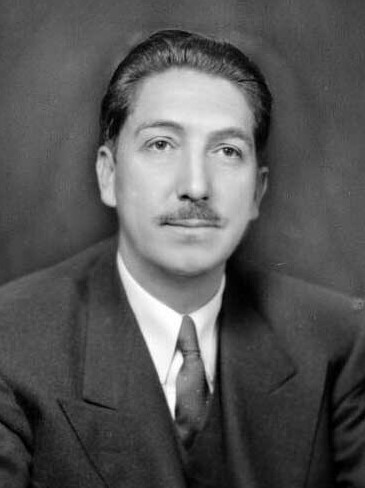
- Miguel Alemán Valdés, c. 1946-52

53rd President of Mexico
- In office 1 December 1946 – 30 November 1952
- Preceded by: Manuel Ávila Camacho
- Succeeded by: Adolfo Ruiz Cortines

Secretary of the Interior
- In office 1 December 1940 – 18 June 1945
- President: Manuel Ávila Camacho
- Preceded by: Ignacio García Téllez
- Succeeded by: Primo Villa Michel

Governor of Veracruz
- In office 1 December 1936 – 6 April 1939
- Preceded by: Ignacio Herrera Tejeda
- Succeeded by: Fernando Casas Alemán

Personal details
- Born: 29 September 1900 Sayula de Alemán, Veracruz, Mexico
- Died: 14 May 1983 (aged 82) Mexico City, Mexico
- Cause of death: Myocardial infarction
- Resting place: Basilica of Our Lady of Guadalupe
- Party: Institutional Revolutionary Party
- Spouse: Beatriz Velasco (m. 1931; died 1981)
- Education: National University of Mexico (LLB)

Miguel Alemán Valdés (Spanish pronunciation: [miˈɣel aleˈman]; 29 September 1900 – 14 May 1983) was a Mexican politician who served a full term as the President of Mexico from 1946 to 1952. He was the first civilian president after a string of revolutionary generals.

His administration was characterized by the country's rapid industrialization, often called the Mexican Miracle, but also for a high level of personal enrichment for himself and his associates. His presidency was the first of a new generation of leaders who had not directly participated in the Mexican Revolution, and many in his cabinet were also young, university-educated civilians, close friends from his days at university.

== Early life and career ==
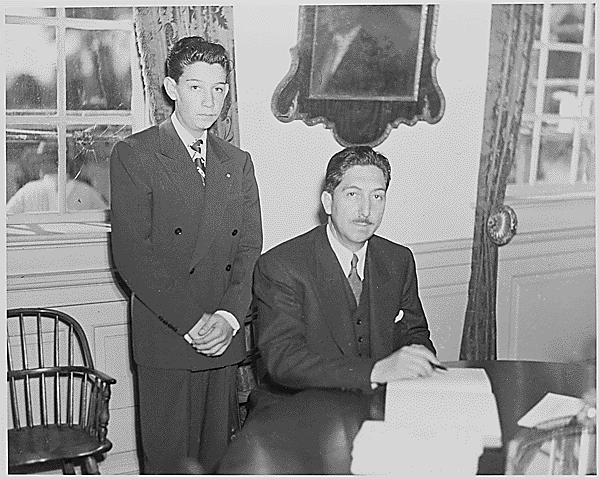
Mexican president Miguel Alemán Valdés and his son Miguel Alemán Velasco signing the guest book at Mount Vernon.

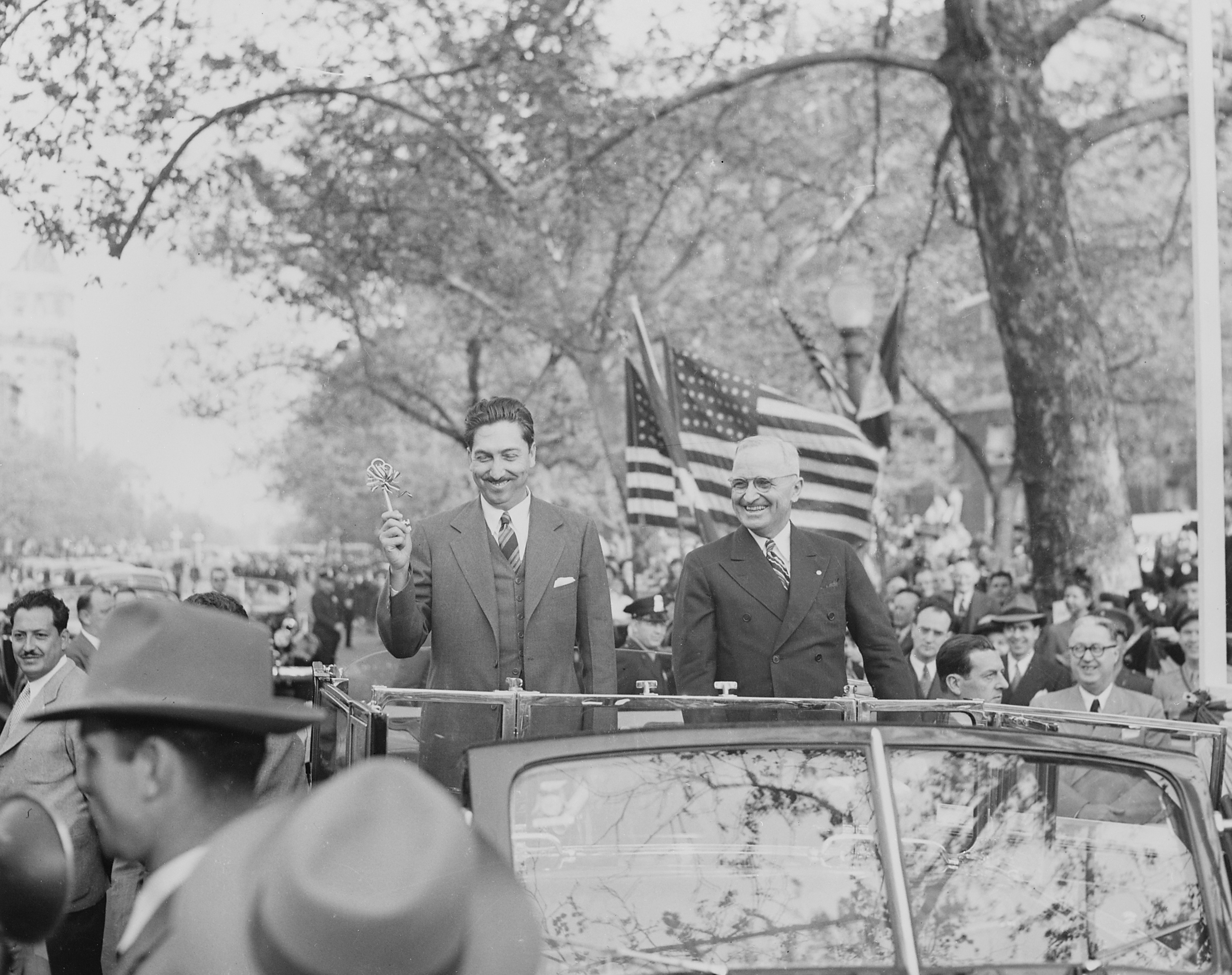
Miguel Alemán Valdés, president of Mexico (left) and Harry S. Truman, president of the United States (right) in Washington, D.C.

Alemán was born in Sayula in the state of Veracruz, the son of revolutionary Gen. Miguel Alemán González and Tomasa Valdés Ledezma. Both had been married before, with Alemán González having a son by his first wife. They had two sons together, Carlos and Miguel. The family lived in straitened circumstances, with Miguel remembering when he was young that when his huaraches hurt his feet, he would urinate on them to soften the leather. His father, Miguel Alemán González, began fighting before the outbreak of the Mexican Revolution, a so-called "precursor" in a region of Veracruz. He avidly read the tracts of Ricardo Flores Magón, of the Mexican Liberal Party and opposed the repressive regime of Porfirio Díaz. Alemán González left his family with his parents to fight with Cándido Aguilar, the son-in-law of Venustiano Carranza, against the Díaz regime. In 1920 the family moved to Mexico City, but with the accession to power of the Sonoran generals Adolfo de la Huerta, Álvaro Obregón, and Plutarco Elías Calles, Alemán González continued in opposition to the government. He was implicated in the murder of one of Obregón's commanders, Arnulfo R. Gómez, and was on the run. The general met his end in March 1929 in a hail of bullets, probably committing suicide.

Young Miguel had experienced first-hand the disruption of the impacts of the continuing violence in Mexico. Alemán's schooling was sporadic in his early years, because of needing to move frequently; he attended schools in Acayucan, Coatzacoalcos, and Orizaba. For a time, he worked at the British-owned Mexican Eagle Petroleum Company, where he first learned English and became fluent in it.

He recalled his father advised him of "the usefulness of returning to my studies and choosing an occupation more stable than the military." Alemán did that, attending the National Preparatory School in Mexico City from 1920 to 1925, founding the newspaper Eureka. He then went to the School of Law at the National University (UNAM) until 1928, completing his law degree with his thesis on occupational diseases and accidents among workers. At UNAM, he was the leader of a group of classmates, all of whom went on the prominence in Mexican life. They included Ángel Carvajal Bernal; Manuel Sánchez Cuen, who served as subdirector of PEMEX in the Alemán administration; Héctor Pérez Martínez; Andrés Serra Rojas; Manuel Ramírez Vázquez; Luis Garrido Díaz, who became rector of UNAM during Alemán's presidency; Antonio Carrillo Flores, who was director of the Fondo de Cultura Económica; and Alfonso Noriega Cantú, head of the Confederación de Cámaras Industriales.

As a successful attorney, his first practice was in representing miners suffering from silicosis. He won two notable legal victories in representing workers against corporations—the first was in securing compensation for dependents of railroad workers who were killed in revolutionary battles, the second was to gain indemnities for miners injured at work. These victories gained him considerable favor with Mexico's labor unions.

== Political career ==
=== First positions ===
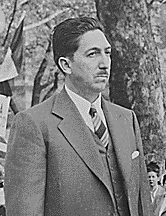
Miguel Alemán

Alemán started public service with a relatively minor appointment as legal adviser to the Secretary of Agriculture and Livestock (1928–30). Other positions followed, including the Federal Board of Conciliation and Arbitration in 1930. In 1933, he served as the President of the Unifying Committee for Plutarco Elías Calles, which brought him into prominence. He then served as a senator from his home state of Veracruz 1934–36, representing the Party of the Mexican Revolution (an earlier name of the party later known as the PRI). When governor-elect Manlio Favio Altamirano was assassinated, Alemán accepted appointment as governor from 1936 to 1939. The appointment can be seen as a political reward from the Cárdenas administration for helping oust Plutarco Elías Calles during the intra-party struggle. From 1940 to 1945, he served as Secretary of the Interior (Gobernación) under Manuel Ávila Camacho after directing Ávila's national presidential campaign. As Secretary of the Interior during World War II, he dealt with Axis espionage and the clerical fascist Sinarquistas.

== 1946 general election campaign ==
Logo of the Institutional Revolutionary Party. Alemán was the first president of the modern iteration of the party founded by Plutarco Elías Calles

President Ávila Camacho chose Alemán as the official candidate of the party in 1945, running for president in 1946. There were many possibilities for the president to choose among, both civilian and military, including Ávila Camacho's older brother, Maximino Ávila Camacho. The Ávila Camacho brothers shared ill health, and Maximino died in February 1945, following a banquet. His death averted a possible political crisis of succession. "There were some who wondered whether something more than seasoning had been added to Maximino's food" the day he died. Among the civilians were Javier Rojo Gómez, the head of government of the Federal District; Marte R. Gómez, Secretary of Agriculture; Dr. Gustavo Baz, secretary of Health; and Ezequiel Padilla, Secretary of Foreign Relations, and Alemán, who headed the most powerful ministry. Military men were also strong contenders, and all previous post-revolutionary presidents had participated in the Mexican Revolution. Miguel Henriquez Guzmán, Enrique Calderón, Jesús Agustín Castro, and Francisco Castillo Nájera were in consideration. Alemán received the backing of the Confederation of Mexican Workers (CTM). Ávila Camacho paved the way with the military for Mexico's first civilian president in the modern era. Prior to the summer election, the Partido de la Revolución Mexicana became the Institutional Revolutionary Party.

== Presidency (1946–1952) ==
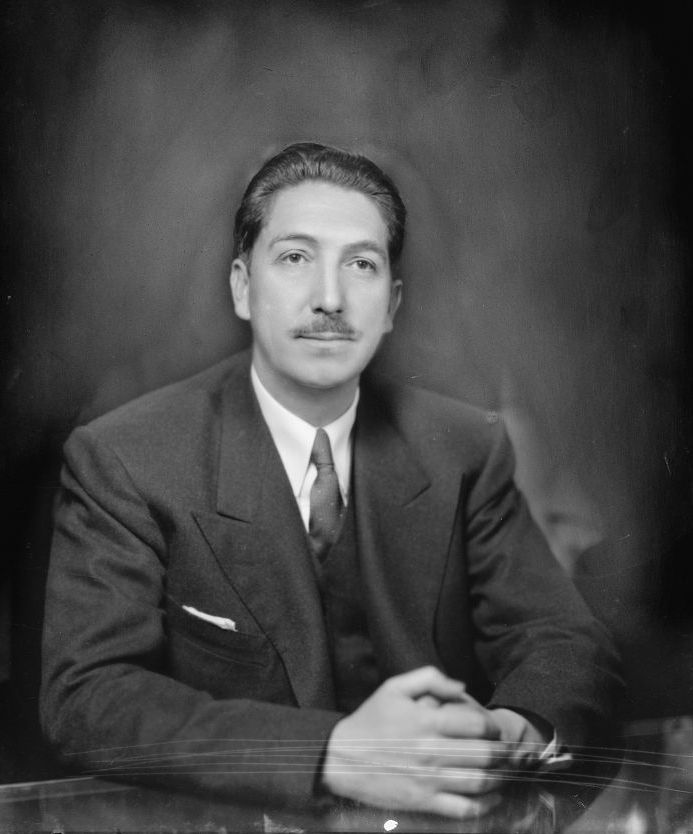
Miguel Alemán Valdés. President of Mexico.

Alemán was inaugurated as President of the Republic on 1 December 1946 and served until 1952, when barred from running from re-election, he returned to civilian life. He was enormously popular prior to his presidency and in his early years as president, but lost support in the waning days of his term.

As president he pushed the program of state-supported industrialization and was very friendly toward business. This stance on economic development was a key reason he was tapped to be the party's candidate rather than possible candidates with ideas similar to those of Cárdenas.

=== Cabinet ===
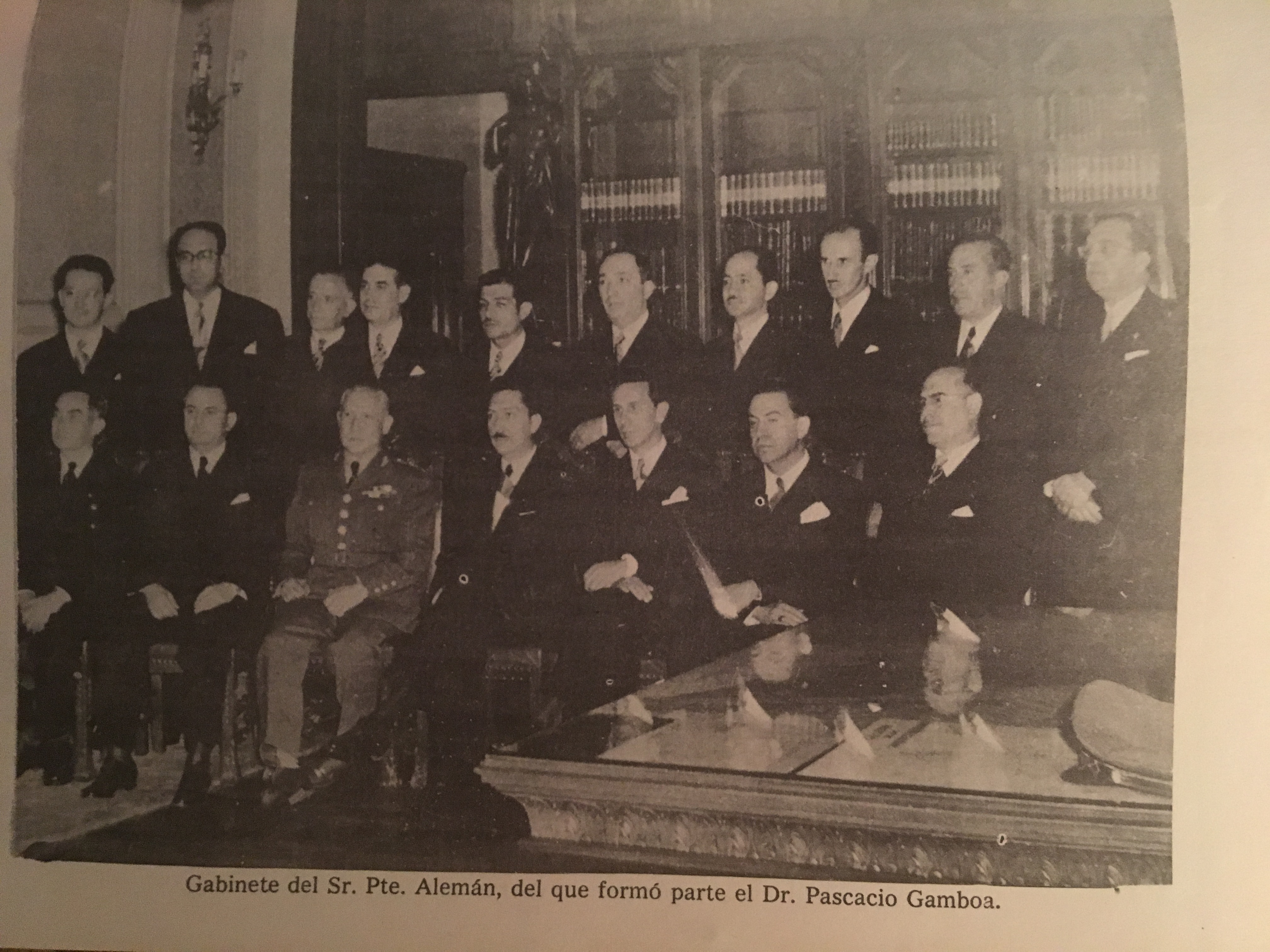
Alemán Valdés (front row, center) and his cabinet.

Alemán's cabinet members were similar in profile to the president himself, relatively young and without military experience, and highly educated, with personal ties to him. His Secretary of the Interior, Héctor Pérez Martínez; Secretary of Public works, Ángel Carvajal; and Secretary of Labor, both Manuel Ramirez Vázquez and Andrés Serra Rojas had all been part of his close-knit group from the Faculty of Law at UNAM.

=== Domestic policy ===
==== Economic policy ====
The Alemán administration reconciled the interests of businessmen and workers, with the purpose of making them forget class struggle and encouraging the development of capitalism, with the promise that both sectors would benefit economically.

==== Educational and cultural policy ====
The first facilities of Ciudad Universitaria, the main campus of the National Autonomous University of Mexico, were also inaugurated. Miguel Alemán met in Chihuahua, at the Government Palace, with the first leader of Section 42 of the SNTE (National Union of Education Workers), Arnulfo Acosta Ochoa, and requested salary equalization with federal teachers.

==== Labor and peasant policy ====
During his presidency, Miguel Alemán joined the anti-communist policy of the United States. A committee of anti-communist activities was created whose main objective was to harass intellectuals and politicians because of their Marxist affiliation, while the establishment of several political associations with this tendency proliferated, outlawing the Workers' Political Party and the Popular Party, both of leftist ideas.

Several demonstrations emerged because of the great discontent that existed in the peasant sector. During the presidency of Manuel Ávila Camacho, a trend had begun of reducing the distribution of land to peasants and encouraging the concentration of land in large estates, leading to strikes and demonstrations.

==== Creation of the Federal Security Directorate ====
In 1947, by decree, he ordered the creation of the Federal Security Directorate (DFS), attached to the Secretariat of the Interior, whose main task was to keep the president informed about the political and social situation of the country. It was originally composed of graduates of the Military College and later formed by personnel from various agencies. Its first director was Colonel Marcelino Iñurreta de la Fuente, who decided to train the institution's first members with special FBI courses in Washington and at other police schools in the United States.

==== Infrastructure ====
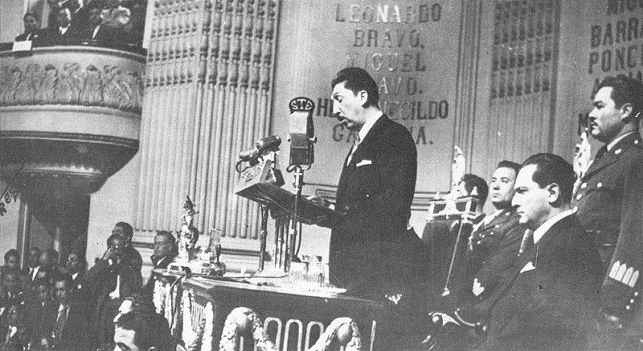
Miguel Alemán Valdés in the Congress.

Alemán directed government spending to state-sponsored industrial development and reduced military spending as had his predecessors. That development included investments in infrastructure, especially public works. Dam-building helped control flooding, expand irrigation, which allowed for the expansion of large-scale agriculture, and provided hydroelectric power. In 1947 he initiated a huge project in the state of Oaxaca, culminating with the opening of the Miguel Alemán Dam in 1955. In 1951 he oversaw completion of the diversion of the Lerma River, bringing Mexico City's water supply problems to an end.

Extending the nation's rail network, building and improving highways brought remote regions into the national economy. In Mexico City an existing airfield was enlarged and became the Mexico City International Airport.

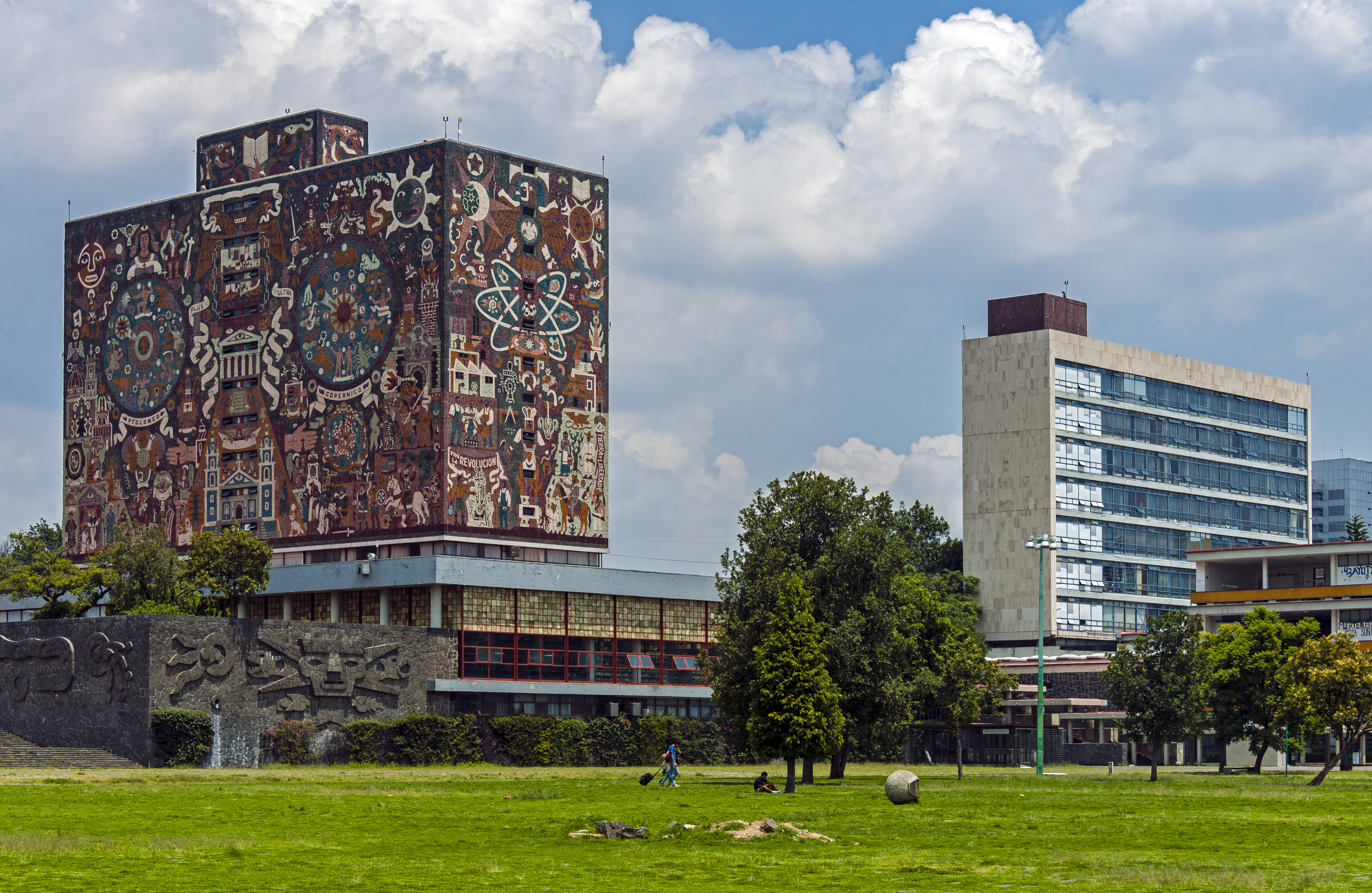
New campus of the National University in the Ciudad Universitaria.

His administration also built a new campus for the National University (UNAM) in the south of the city, moving it from its previous location in downtown Mexico City.

In 1952 his administration elevated Baja California to state status. Also during his term, he asserted power by forced imposition of state governors.

He played a major role in the development and support of the city of Acapulco as an international tourist destination.

=== Foreign policy ===
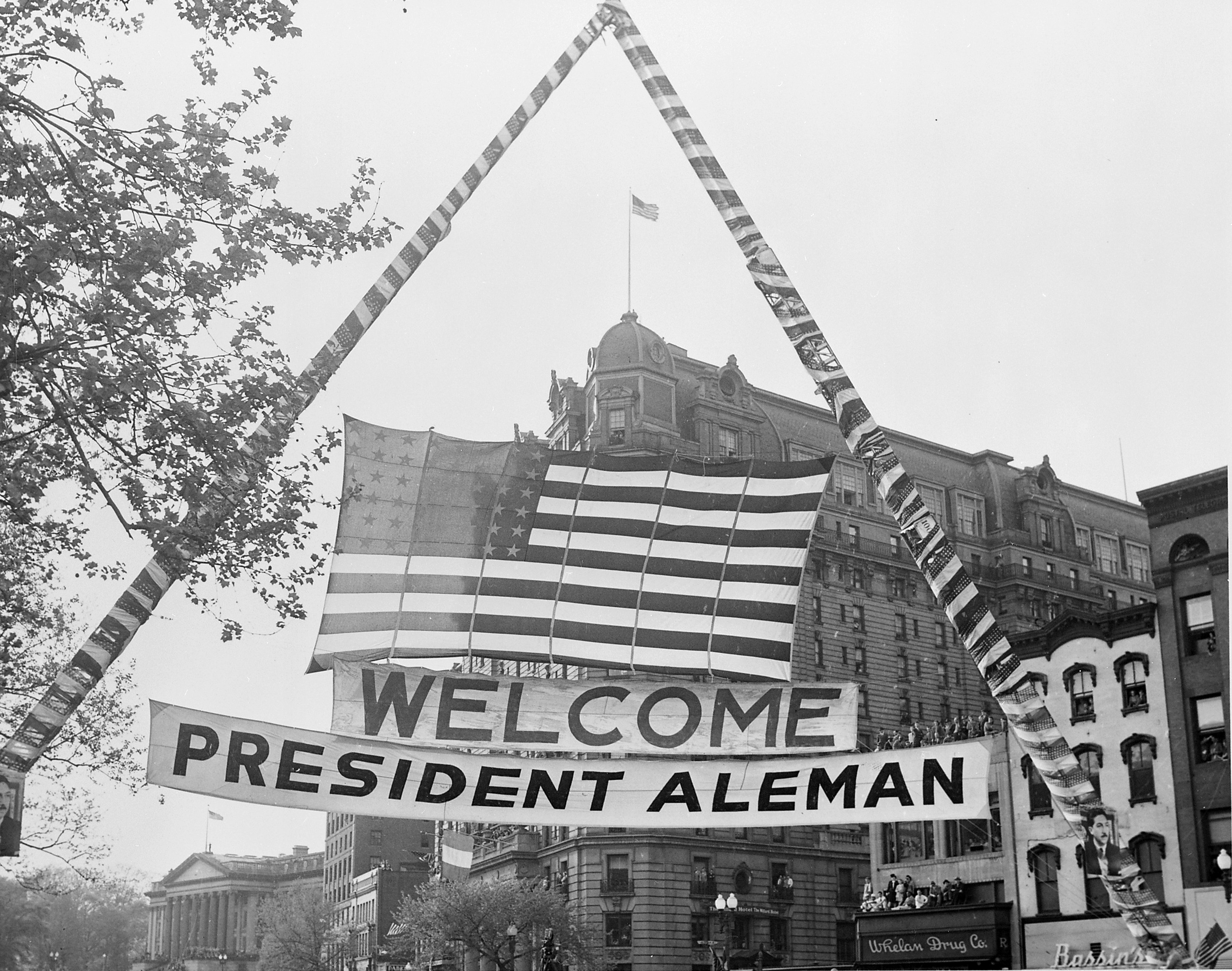
Banner in Washington, D.C. welcoming Alemán on his official visit in 1947.

During his administration the close relationship with the US developed during World War II continued, although he refused to send Mexican troops to participate in the Korean War.

In 1947, on the eve of the Cold War, he created the Mexican DFS intelligence agency to support and cooperate with CIA operations in Mexico. Its stated mission was "preserving the internal stability . . . against all forms of subversion".

He negotiated a major loan from the United States in 1947. Alemán and US President Harry S. Truman rode in a parade in Washington that attracted an estimated 600,000 well-wishers.

==== Official international trips ====
This is a list of official trips abroad made by Alemán Valdés during his presidency.

According to Article 88 of the Constitution of Mexico, the president may leave the country for up to seven days by informing the Senate or, where applicable, the Permanent Commission in advance of the reasons for the absence, as well as of the results of the measures carried out. For absences longer than seven days, permission from the Senate or the Permanent Commission is required.

Date	Destination	Main purpose
1947
29 April – 3 May	Washington, D.C., New York, Chattanooga and Kansas City (United States)	State visit and meeting with President of the United States Harry S. Truman to continue the dialogue initiated during the U.S. president's visit to Mexico in March, regarding a line of credit of 150 million dollars.

== 1952 general election ==
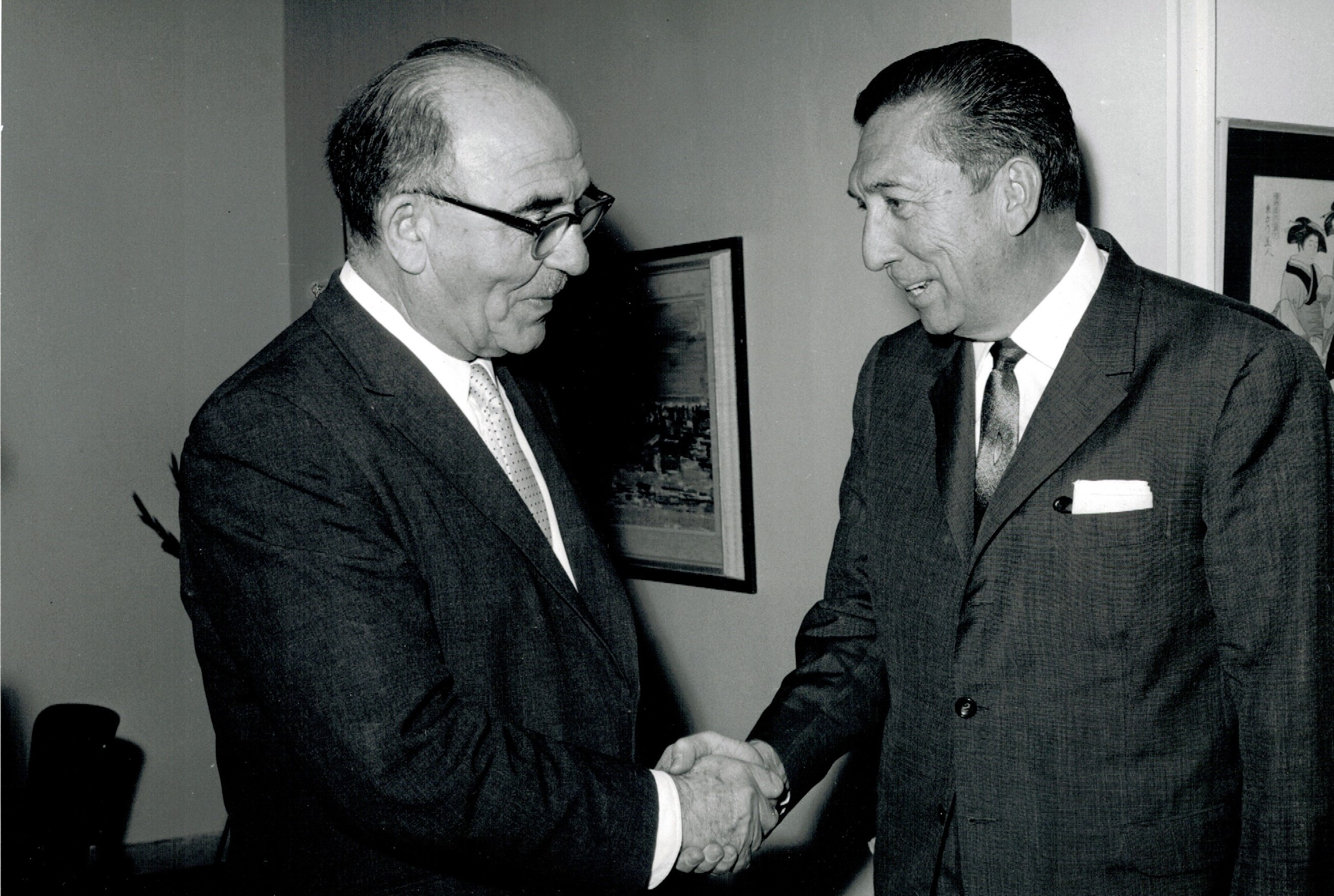
Former President Miguel Alemán Valdés meeting with Prime Minister Levi Eshkol, 1963.

In party tradition, Alemán designated his successor as PRI presidential candidate—and the foregone expectation of the next president. He selected Adolfo Ruiz Cortines, with a reputation for honesty and probity, a sharp contrast to his own record of considerable self-enrichment in office. Before the announcement (destape), there were rumors that Alemán wanted to hold onto power and the a constitutional amendment to allow re-election or extension of his existing term was in the works. The PRI party founder, Plutarco Elías Calles, had remained the power behind the presidency in the six years after president-elect Álvaro Obregón's assassination in 1928. That power void had led to the creation of the Partido Nacional Revolucionario, and Calles called the shots during three the presidencies of Emilio Portes Gil, Pascual Ortiz Rubio, and Abelardo L. Rodríguez. He had expected his control to continue during the presidency of his hand-picked candidate Lázaro Cárdenas. However, Cárdenas won the power struggle with Calles, exiling him. When Cárdenas's term was nearing its end in 1940, he did continue the tradition of the president choosing his successor and picked the more conservative Manuel Ávila Camacho (1940–46). But in contrast to Calles, Cárdenas stepped away from power, and Ávila Camacho was a fully empowered president. When the rumors of Alemán surfaced about seeking to hold onto power, Cárdenas vigorously objected, so although he did not directly take part in politics, he maintained a level of influence.

Unlike 1946's peaceful change of power, 1952 was another contested presidential election. Career military officer Miguel Henríquez Guzmán sought to be the candidate of the PRI. Henríquez was backed by some important politicians, including members of the Cárdenas family, who objected to the rightward turn of the party and the government. Among those who supported Henríquez were the Mexican ambassador to the U.S.; an ex-governor of the important state of Mexico; and a number of military officers. He gathered further support from some students, peasant groups, and discontented workers. According to historian Daniel Cosío Villegas, Alemán was in contact with former President Cárdenas, warning that the Henríquez challenge was a danger to the new system. Alemán chose Adolfo Ruiz Cortines as the PRI candidate. Once announced in the destape (unveiling of the official candidate), the CTM under the leadership of Fidel Velázquez mobilized their hundreds of thousands of members behind Ruiz Cortines. The PRI offered an opening to some Catholics, which was aimed at undermining the candidate for the National Action Party (PAN), Efraín González Luna. Marxist politician and labor leader Vicente Lombardo Toledano ran as well. In the end, the PRI defeated the opposition parties, taking 74.3% of votes cast, but opposition parties on the left and right showed that the PRI was not completely dominant. This election was the last until the election in 2000 with an open PRI campaign prior to president revealing his choice of successor.

== Post-presidency ==
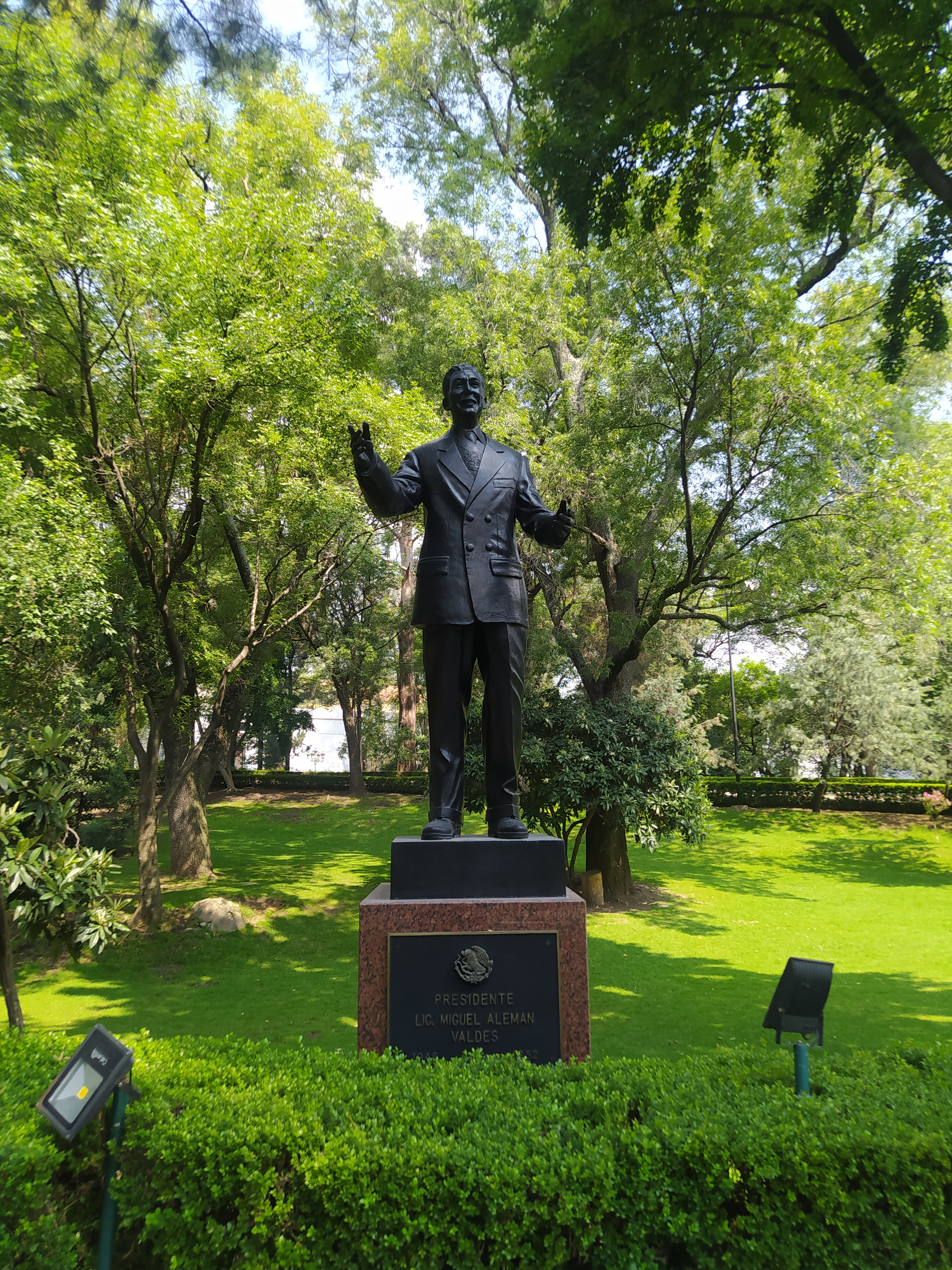
Statue of Miguel Alemán in Los Pinos, Mexico City.

Alemán accumulated a fortune during his lifetime. In his post-presidential years, he directed the country's tourism agency and a significant figure in the ownership of Mexican media, including the major television network Televisa. In politics, he was the leader of the right wing of the PRI. In 1961, he was named the president of the national tourist commission, and was influential in bringing the 1968 Summer Olympics to Mexico City. In addition, he was the first president of the Mr. Amigo Association in 1964, which celebrates the bi-national friendliness between the United States and Mexico in the Charro Days and Sombrero Festival celebrations held in Matamoros, Tamaulipas, and Brownsville, Texas. In 1987, his memoirs, entitled Remembranzas y testimonios, were published.

His son Miguel Alemán Velasco is the CEO of Grupo Alemán (Galem), which included Interjet.

== See also ==
- Institutional Revolutionary Party
- List of heads of state of Mexico
- Mexican Miracle
