= Governor of Veracruz =

Governor of Mexican state

- Gobernador de Veracruz

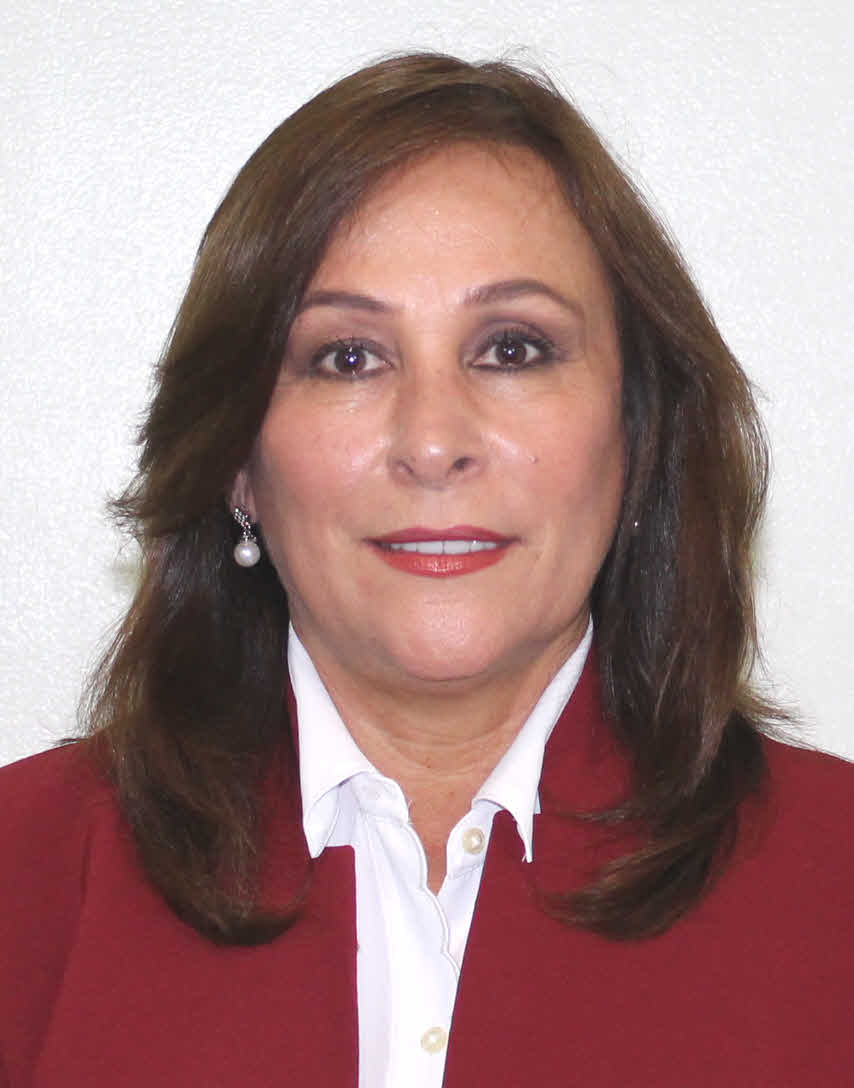
- Incumbent; Rocío Nahle García since December 1, 2024
- Member of: CONAGO
- Residence: State Government Palace
- Seat: Xalapa-Enríquez
- Appointer: Popular vote
- Term length: Six years, non-renewable.
- Constituting instrument: State Constitution
- Inaugural holder: Miguel Barragán
- Formation: 20 May 1825
- Salary: MXN$58,801.96
- Website: veracruz.gob.mx/gobiernover/gobernador/

The governor, according to the Political Constitution of the Free and Sovereign State of Veracruz de Ignacio de la Llave in Mexico, the Executive Power is invested in one individual, called "Constitutional Governor of the Free and Sovereign State of Veracruz de Ignacio de la Llave". The current governor is Rocío Nahle García, who assumed the position on December 1, 2024. She is a member of the National Regeneration Movement and the first woman to hold the office.

== Term ==
Governors are elected to serve for 6 years and they can not hold the title under any circumstance ever again. The governor takes office on the first day of December of the same electoral year and ends on November 30 six years after.

The State of Veracruz was created on 1824, being one of the original States of the Federation, it has experienced all the political systems implemented in Mexico, federalism and centralism, thus it has changed its name from "State of" to "Department of" to "State of" again.

== List of governors ==
The list with all the governors of the State since 1825 follows.

=== Nineteenth century ===
==== Free and Sovereign State of Veracruz ====
- (1824 – 1824): Guadalupe Victoria
- (1824 – 1825): Miguel Barragán (provisional)
- (1825 – 1829): Miguel Barragán
- (1829 – 1829): Sebastián Camacho Castilla (First Term)
- (1829 – 1829): Antonio López de Santa Anna (First Term)
- (1829 – 1829): Sebastián Camacho Castilla (Second Term)
- (1829 – 1829): Antonio López de Santa Anna (Second Term)
- (1829 – 1830): Antonio López de Santa Anna (Third Term)
- (1833 – 1833): Antonio Juille y Moreno (First Term)
- (1833 – 1834): Antonio Juille y Moreno (Second Term)

==== Department of Veracruz ====
From 1834 to 1857 there are no popular-elected governors due to Santa Anna's centralist Seven Laws.

==== Free and Sovereign State of Veracruz ====
- (1857 - 1857): Manuel Gutiérrez Zamora (First Term)
- (1857 - 1857): José de Emparán (Interim Governor)
- (1857 - 1861): Manuel Gutiérrez Zamora (Second Term)
- (1861 - 1862): Ignacio de la Llave y Segura Zevallos

==== Veracruz in the Second Empire ====
From 1864 to 1867.

==== Free and Sovereign State of Veracruz-Llave ====
- (1867 - 1871): Francisco Hernández y Hernández (First Term)
- (1871 - 1872): Francisco Hernández y Hernández (Second Term)
- (1872 - 1875): Francisco Landero y Cos
- (1875 - 1876): José María Mena Isassi
- (1877 - 1880): Luis Mier y Terán
- (1880 - 1883): Apolinar Castillo
- (1883 - 1884): José Cortés Frías (Interim Governor)
- (1884 - 1888): Juan de la Luz Enríquez (First Term)
- (1888 - 1892): Juan de la Luz Enríquez (Second Term)
- (1892 - 1892): Manuel Leví (Interim Governor)
- (1892 - 1892): Leandro M. Alcolea Sierra (Interim Governor)
- (1892 - 1896): Teodoro A. Dehesa Méndez (First Term)
- (1896 - 1900): Teodoro A. Dehesa Méndez (Second Term)
- (1900 - 1904): Teodoro A. Dehesa Méndez (Third Term)

=== Twentieth century ===
- (1904 - 1908): Teodoro A. Dehesa Méndez (Fourth Term)
- (1908 - 1911): Teodoro A. Dehesa Méndez (Fifth Term)
- (1911 - 1911): Emilio Léycegui (Interim Governor)
- (1911 - 1911): León Aillaud (Interim Governor)
- (1911 - 1912): Manuel María Alegre (Interim Governor)
- (1912 - 1912): Francisco Lagos Cházaro Mortero
- (1912 - 1913): Antonio Pérez Rivera
- (1917 - 1917): Mauro Loyo Sánchez (Interim Governor)
- (1917 - 1920): Cándido Aguilar Vargas
- (1920 - 1924): Adalberto Tejeda Olivares (First Term)
- (1924 - 1927): Heriberto Jara Corona
- (1927 - 1928): Abel S. Rodríguez
- (1928 - 1932): Adalberto Tejeda Olivares (Second Term)
- (1932 - 1935): Gonzalo Vázquez Vela, National Revolutionary Party, PNR
- (1935 - 1936): Guillermo Rebolledo (Interim Governor), PNR
- (1936 - 1936): Ignacio Herrera Tejeda (Interim Governor), PNR
- (1936 - 1939): Miguel Alemán Valdés, PNR
- (1939 - 1940): Fernando Casas Alemán (Interim Governor)
- (1940 - 1944): Jorge Cerdán Lara, Party of the Mexican Revolution, PRM
- (1944 - 1948): Adolfo Ruíz Cortines, PRM
- (1948 - 1950): Ángel Carvajal Bernal (Interim Governor)
- (1950 - 1956): Marco Antonio Muñoz Turnbull PRI
- (1956 - 1962): Antonio María Quirasco PRI
- (1962 - 1968): Fernando López Arias PRI
- (1968 - 1974): Rafael Murillo Vidal PRI
- (1974 - 1980): Rafael Hernández Ochoa PRI
- (1980 - 1986): Agustín Acosta Lagunes PRI
- (1986 - 1988): Fernando Gutiérrez Barrios PRI
- (1988 - 1992): Dante Delgado Rannauro (Interim Governor) PRI
- (1992 - 1998): Patricio Chirinos Calero PRI
- (1998 - 2004): Miguel Alemán Velasco PRI

=== Twenty-first century ===
==== Free and Sovereign State of Veracruz de Ignacio de la Llave ====
| No. | Portrait | Name | Governorship | Term of office | | | Political party | Notes |
| No. | Portrait | Name | Governorship | Took office | Left office | Time in office | Political party | Notes |
|---|---|---|---|---|---|---|---|---|
| | | Fidel Herrera Beltrán | Constitutional | 1 December 2004 | 30 November 2010 | 6 years, 0 days | PRI | |
| | | Javier Duarte de Ochoa | Constitutional | 1 December 2010 | 12 October 2016 | 5 years, 316 days | PRI | In October 2016, Duarte was declared a criminal by the Mexican government and was arrested in April 2017. The PRI issued an apology and expelled him from the political party. |
| | | Flavino Ríos Alvarado | Substitute | 12 October 2016 | 30 November 2016 | 50 days | PRI | Served as substitute governor, after Duarte leaving the position, he was later accused of aiding Duarte to escape, and sentenced to 1 year in prision, as a cautionary measure. |
| | | Miguel Ángel Yunes Linares | Constitutional | 1 December 2016 | 30 November 2018 | 2 years, 0 days | PAN | Governorship lasted only 2 years to align state elections with federal general elections |
| | | Cuitláhuac García Jiménez | Constitutional | 1 December 2018 | 30 November 2024 | 6 years, 0 days | Morena | |
| | | Rocío Nahle García | Constitutional | 1 December 2024 | Incumbent | 1 year, 329 days | Morena | |

== See also ==
- List of Mexican state governors
- State of Veracruz
