= León Aillaud =

Governor of Veracruz from June to December 1911

León Aillaud Barreiro

27th Governor of Veracruz
- In office June 22, 1911 – December 12, 1911
- Preceded by: Emilio Léycegui
- Succeeded by: Manuel María Alegre

Personal details
- Born: October 1, 1880 Veracruz, Veracruz
- Died: September 25, 1936 (aged 87) Mexico City, Mexico
- Spouse: Mercedes Cabrera

León Aillaud Barreiro was an interim Governor of the Mexican State of Veracruz in the period from June 22, 1911, to December 12, 1911.

Barreiro was born in the city and port of Veracruz, in the year 1880.

Preceded by Emilio Léycegui	Governor of Veracruz; 1911 - 1911	Succeeded by Manuel María Alegre
