= Othón Salazar =

- Born: May 17, 1924; Alcozauca de Guerrero, Guerrero
- Died: December 4, 2008 (aged 84); Tlapa de Comonfort, Guerrero

Othón Salazar Ramírez (1924–2008) was a Mexican normal school teacher and revolutionary. The Casa de Cultura Othón Salazar Ramírez is named after him.

== Education ==
The son of parents who operated a bakery, Othón worked from an early age, but also went to school. In 1942, Othón started attending the Oaxtepec Normal School. There, the teachers saw the last flashes of the Mexican Revolution, leaving them with many social concerns. He completed only the first year in Oaxtepec. He did his second year in the Ayotzinapa Rural Teachers' College and the third at the National Teachers College. Afterwards, he entered the Superior Normal School, where he studied for four years. There he specialized in social sciences to prepare him to teach civics.

== Activism ==
In 1954, Othón was an instrumental leader in the first strike of the Normal Superior. In 1956, when leaders of the Sindicato Nacional de Trabajadores de la Educación (SNTE) (National Association of Workers in Education) negotiated a wage increase which was not even half of what was initially demanded, Othón convened a protest rally. Shortly afterwards, an independent assembly elected him as representative to form the basis for the Movimiento Revolucionario del Magisterio (MRM) (Revolutionary Teachers Movement) which was formed in late 1957 and whose presence in the Federal District's elementary schools was expanding. The following year MRM was at the forefront of one of the largest teachers' struggles. The demonstrations that were organized were attended by a broad social sector. Government, in order to suppress them, as was done with the April 12, 1958 march, fostered social discontent that was simmering for years.

While authorities refused to recognize the MRM, its capacity to convene became increasingly effective and, on April 30 teachers took the offices of the Secretaría de Educación Pública (SEP) (Ministry of Education), forcing the government to negotiate. In August, in a parallel congress, teachers in Mexico City elected Othón as their legitimate representative, but with this gesture of trade union autonomy the government's position was hardening.

=== Arrest ===
The demonstration on September 8 was suppressed, and Othón apprehended. Officers arrived at his home early, tied and blindfolded him. They then subjected him to harsh interrogation and demanded that he confess how many rubles he was receiving from the Soviet Union. He was held hostage for nine days before processing. He was accused of social dissolution, was imprisoned in Lecumberri, but thanks to large demonstrations for his freedom, he remained there only three days.

In the year 1958, a year of great labor unrest, the MRM teachers were among the main protagonists. That same year the protests of the telegraph operators, tankers, and railroad workers shocked the country. The struggles had their origins in economic demands, but their desire for union democracy had much wider implications, and shook the structures of the Partido Revolucionario Institucional PRI (Or in English: The Institutional Revolutionary Party). Workers showed their dissatisfaction with working conditions that the statistics on miraculous economic growth concealed.

The government managed to defeat these movements that proposed democratizing the system. But the participants who remained engaged in keeping alive the popular causes could not be silenced. Othón continued his struggle in teaching, and in 1960, he participated in another strike at the National Teachers College. This action was repressed and Othón was fired for his role in the protests.

== Personal life ==
He was born in Alcozauca de Guerrero, Guerrero on May 17, 1924.

After being fired, Othón lived in a precarious economic situation, aggravated by his advanced age. He eventually returned to Alcozauca, his native village in Guerrero, and toured the region of Montaña, listening to and advising those who were organized there.

In 1980 he ran for governor of Guerrero for the Mexican Communist Party, becoming Mayor of this municipality (1987-1990).

He died of kidney disease on December 4, 2008 in the city of Tlapa de Comonfort, Guerrero at the age of 84.
