= Jorge Cerdán Lara =

Mexican politician

Jorge Cerdán Lara (23 July 1897 – 15 August 1958) was a Mexican attorney and politician who served as governor of the state of Veracruz from 1940 to 1944. He was a member of the Institutional Revolutionary Party (PRI).

Cerdán Lara was born in the city of Xalapa, Veracruz. He played a key role in the creation of the Universidad Veracruzana.

== See also ==
- Governor of Veracruz
