= Blanca Magrassi Scagno =

Blanca Margarita Magrassi Scagno (November 29, 1923 – October 9, 2015) was a Mexican women's rights activist, civil and pro-democracy activist, politician and leading figure within the National Action Party (PAN). Magrassi Scagno, the wife and political partner of Luis H. Álvarez, the former President of the National Action Party, served as a member of PAN's national executive committee from 1988 to 1990. She was considered a moral authority within PAN and Mexican politics.

== Biography ==
Blanca Magrassi Scagno was born in Tampico, Tamaulipas, on November 29, 1923. She completed middle school and high school at St. Teresa's Academy in San Antonio, Texas. Magrassi earned a bachelor's degree in 1944 from the University of the Incarnate Word in Texas. She later completed her master's degree in educational psychology from New Mexico State University in 1967. Her research was published in Mexican Psychology Magazine, the Center for Educational Studies Magazine, Educational Studies in Latin America Magazine and the National Council of Science and Technology.

She married Luis H. Álvarez. The couple had two children, Blanca Estela and Luis Jorge.

Magrassi was the PAN candidate for Municipal President, or Mayor, of Chihuahua in 1968. She was also nominated as the PAN candidate for the national Senate of the Republic, representing the state of Chihuahua, during the 1988 general election.

Magrassi's husband, Luis H. Álvarez, was elected Municipal President of Chihuahua in 1983. In 1986, Álvarez joined with Francisco Villarreal, the Mayor of Ciudad Juarez, and Víctor Manuel Oropeza, the state leader of the Mexican Workers' Party (PMT), and Heberto Castillo, the national President of PMT, began a hunger strike to protest electoral fraud in the gubernatorial election in Chihuahua state. To call attention to Chihuahua's electoral fraud and end the hunger strike, Blanca Magrassi Scagno and Luz María de Oropeza, the wife of Oropeza, traveled to Mexico City to request a meeting with Mexican President Miguel de la Madrid. Magrassi and Oropeza waited for hours before President de la Madrid agreed to meet with the duo. In the meeting, Magrassi frankly told the President, "No es un partido, es un pueblo que quiere vivir en democracia." The wives, with PAN President Pablo Emilio Madero, then held a press conference at PAN's national headquarters following the meeting.

Magrassi served as the Secretary for the Promotion of Women (Secretaria de Promoción Política de la Mujer) of PAN from 1987 to 1993. She was also a member of the National Action Party's (PAN) national committee from 1988 to 1990.

She was honored as "Woman of the Year" by the Association of Professional Women of Chihuahua (la Asociación de Mujeres Profesionales de Chihuahua) in 1996. She also received the Distinguished Alumni Award from the University of the Incarnate Word for education and community service in 1995, as well as the Distinguished Alumni Award and the Distinguished International Alumni Award from New Mexico State University in 2008.

Blanca Magrassi Scagno died on October 9, 2015, at the age of 92. She was survived by her husband, Luis H. Álvarez.
