= Gustavo Díaz Ordaz =

President of Mexico from 1964 to 1970

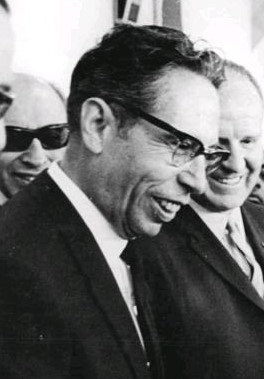
- Díaz in 1967

56th President of Mexico
- In office 1 December 1964 – 30 November 1970
- Preceded by: Adolfo López Mateos
- Succeeded by: Luis Echeverría

Secretary of the Interior of Mexico
- In office 1 December 1958 – 15 November 1964
- President: Adolfo López Mateos
- Preceded by: Ángel Carvajal Bernal
- Succeeded by: Luis Echeverría

Senator of the Congress of the Union for Puebla
- In office 1 September 1946 – 31 August 1952
- Preceded by: Noé Lecona Soto
- Succeeded by: Luis C. Manjarrez

Member of the Chamber of Deputies for Puebla's 1st district
- In office 1 September 1943 – 31 August 1946
- Preceded by: Martín Torres
- Succeeded by: Blas Chumacero

Personal details
- Born: Gustavo Díaz Ordaz Bolaños; 12 March 1911 San Andrés, Puebla, Mexico
- Died: 15 July 1979 (aged 68) Mexico City, Mexico
- Resting place: Panteón Jardín, Mexico City, Mexico
- Party: Institutional Revolutionary Party
- Spouse: Guadalupe Borja (m. 1937; died 1974)
- Children: 3
- Relatives: Chespirito (first cousin once removed)
- Education: University of Puebla (LLB)
- Profession: Politician

Gustavo Díaz Ordaz Bolaños (Spanish pronunciation: [ɡusˈtaβo ˈði.as oɾˈðas]; 12 March 1911 – 15 July 1979) was a Mexican politician and member of the Institutional Revolutionary Party (PRI). He served as the President of Mexico from 1964 to 1970. Previously, he served as a member of the Chamber of Deputies for Puebla's 1st district, a senator of the Congress of the Union for Puebla, and Secretary of the Interior.

Díaz Ordaz was born in San Andrés Chalchicomula, and obtained a law degree from the University of Puebla in 1937 where he later became its vice-rector. He represented Puebla's 1st district in the Chamber of Deputies from 1943 to 1946. Subsequently, he represented the same state in the Chamber of Senators from 1946 to 1952 becoming closely acquainted with then-senator Adolfo López Mateos. Díaz Ordaz was a CIA asset, known by the cryptonym, LITEMPO-2.

Díaz Ordaz joined the campaign of Adolfo Ruiz Cortines for the 1952 election and subsequently worked for the Secretariat of the Interior under Ángel Carvajal Bernal. He became the secretary following López Mateos' victory in the 1958 election, and exercised de facto executive power during the absences of the president, particularly during the Cuban Missile Crisis. In 1963, the PRI announced him as the presidential candidate for the 1964 election, he received 88.81% of the popular vote.

His administration is mostly remembered for the student protests that took place in 1968, and their subsequent repression by the Army and State forces during the Tlatelolco massacre, in which hundreds of unarmed protesters were killed. His presidency also took place during a period of high economic growth known as the Mexican Miracle, as well as hosting both the 1968 Summer Olympics and 1970 FIFA World Cup, the first country to have organized both showpiece events two years apart.

After passing on the presidency to his own Secretary of the Interior Luis Echeverría, Díaz Ordaz retired from public life. He was briefly the Ambassador to Spain in 1977, a position he resigned from after strong protests and criticism by the media. He died of colorectal cancer on 15 July 1979 at the age of 68.

Despite high economic growth during his presidency, Díaz Ordaz is considered one of the most unpopular and controversial modern Mexican presidents, largely for the Tlatelolco massacre and other repressive acts, which would continue into the presidencies of his successors.

== Early life and education ==
Gustavo Díaz Ordaz Bolaños was born on 12 March 1911 in San Andrés Chalchicomula (now Ciudad Serdán), Puebla. His family was of mixed Spanish and Indigenous ancestry. He had two older siblings, Ramón (born 1905) and María (born 1908), and two younger siblings, Ernesto and Guadalupe. In his later years his father, Ramón Díaz Ordaz Redonet, worked as an accountant. However, for a decade he served in the political machine of President Porfirio Díaz, becoming the jefe político and police administrator of San Andrés Chilchicomula. When Díaz was ousted by revolutionary forces in May 1911 at the outbreak of the Mexican Revolution, he lost his bureaucratic post in the regime change. Subsequently, the family's financial situation was insecure, and Díaz Ordaz's father took a number of jobs and the family frequently moved. He claimed ancestry with conqueror-chronicler Bernal Díaz del Castillo. Gustavo's mother, Sabina Bolaños Cacho de Díaz Ordaz, was a school teacher, described as "stern and pious". Gustavo, as well as his elder brother Rámon, had a weak chin and large protruding teeth and was skinny. "His mother would freely say to anyone, 'But what an ugly son I have!'" His lack of good looks became a way to mock him when he became president of Mexico.

The comedian Chespirito (real name Roberto Gómez Bolaños) was his first cousin once removed.

When the family lived for a time in Oaxaca, the young Díaz Ordaz attended the Institute of Arts and Sciences, whose alumni included Benito Juárez and Porfirio Díaz. He was a serious student, but due to his family's financial circumstances, he could not always buy the textbooks he needed. At one point, the family lived as a charity case with a maternal uncle in Oaxaca, who was a Oaxaca state official. The family had to absent themselves when powerful visitors came to the residence. While Gustavo attended the institute, his elder brother Ramón taught there after studies in Spain, teaching Latin. A student mocked Professor Ramón Díaz Ordaz's ugliness, and Gustavo defended his brother with physical force. Díaz Ordaz graduated from the University of Puebla on 8 February 1937 with a law degree. He became a professor at the university and served as vice-rector from 1940 to 1941.

== Early political career ==
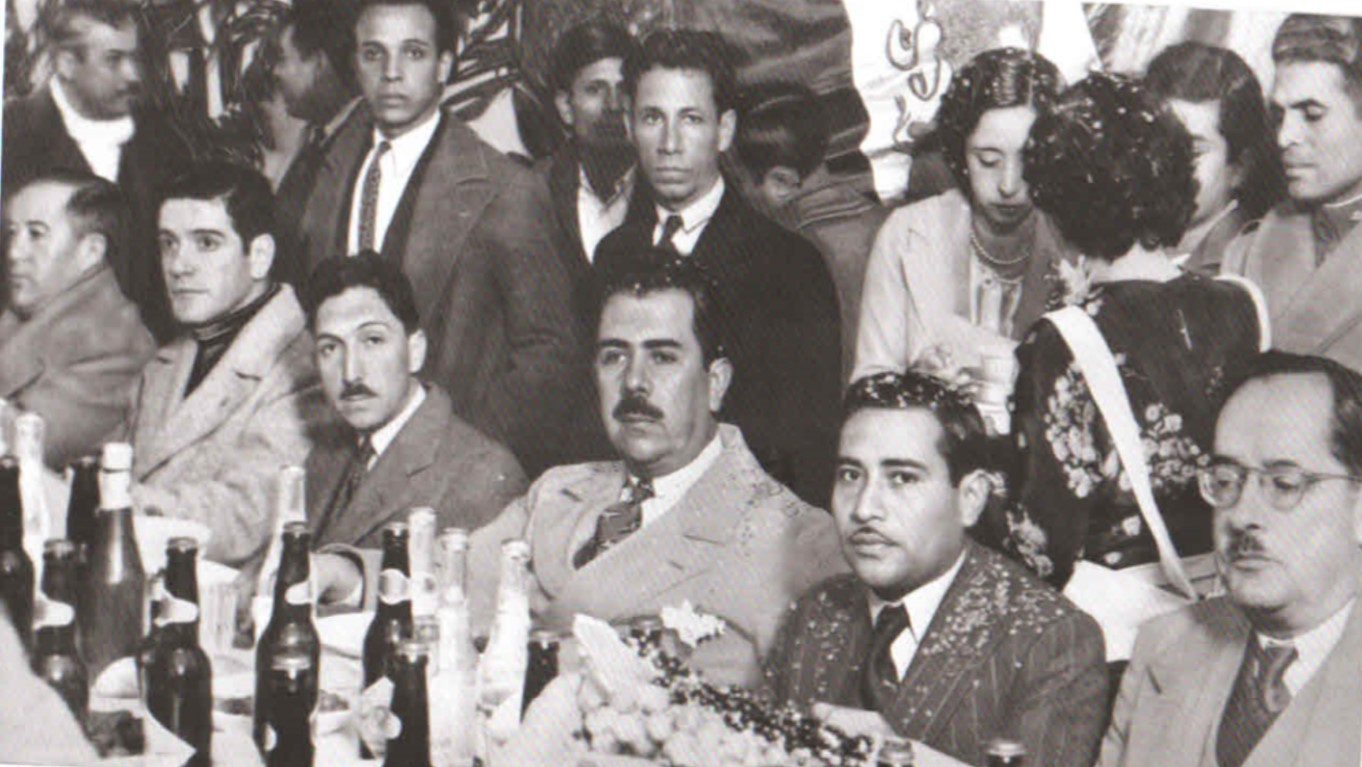
A young Díaz Ordaz in 1938, behind President Lázaro Cárdenas (front row, center), and future presidents Manuel Ávila Camacho (front row, farthest to the left), and Miguel Alemán (front row immediately left of center).

His political career had a modest start. He had not fought in the Revolution and his father had been part of Porfirio Díaz's regime, so his political rise was not straightforward. He served in the government of Puebla from 1932 to 1943. In the latter year he became a federal politician, serving in the Chamber of Deputies for the 1st federal electoral district of Puebla, and he served as a senator for the same state from 1946 to 1952. He came to national prominence in the cabinet of President President Adolfo López Mateos from 1958 to 1964, as Minister of the Interior (Gobernación). On 18 November 1963, he became the presidential candidate for the Institutional Revolutionary Party (PRI). Despite facing only token opposition, Díaz Ordaz campaigned as if he were the underdog. He won the presidential election on 5 July 1964, with 88.8% of the popular vote, while his main opponent, José González Torres of the National Action Party garnered only 10.9%.

== Presidency (1964–1970) ==
=== Inauguration ===
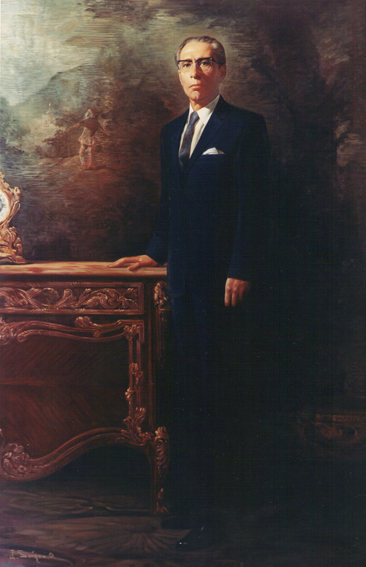
Portrait of President Díaz Ordaz, c. 1964–1969

Díaz Ordaz assumed the presidency on 1 December 1964 at the Palacio de Bellas Artes. There, he took the oath before the Congress of the Union presided over by Alfonso Martínez Domínguez. Former president Adolfo López Mateos turned over the presidential sash, and Díaz Ordaz delivered his inaugural address. The address lasted almost an hour, which was long for an inauguration speech in Mexico at the time. In his address, he promised to defend Mexico's constitution, submit to the will of Mexico's people, to prioritize the needs of Mexico's farmers, and (in response to criticism of the government's heavy involvement in business) that the government would not compete or supplant private investment. On foreign policy, he stated that Mexico would not break off relations with Fidel Castro's Cuba, and that foreign investment was always welcome in Mexico as long as laws were followed. He announced the members of his cabinet, retaining four ministers from López Mateos. Also at the inauguration were former presidents Emilio Portes Gil, Abelardo L. Rodríguez, Lázaro Cárdenas, Miguel Alemán Valdés, and Adolfo Ruiz Cortines.

=== Domestic policy ===
As president, Díaz Ordaz was known for his authoritarian manner of rule over his cabinet and the country in general. His strictness was evident in his handling of a number of protests during his term, in which railroad workers, teachers, and doctors were fired for taking industrial action. A first demonstration of this new authoritarianism was given when he used force to end a strike by medics. Medics of the Institute for Social Security and Services for State Workers, especially residents and interns, had organized a strike to demand better working conditions and an increased salary. His authoritarian style of governing produced resistance such as the emergence of a guerrilla movement in the state of Guerrero. Economically, the era of Díaz Ordaz was a time of growth. He established the Mexican Institute of Petroleum in 1965, an important step, for oil has been one of Mexico's most productive industries.

==== Economy ====
The government of Díaz Ordaz promoted the economic development of Mexico, continuing the model of the “stabilizing development”. National GDP maintained growth between 6 and 8%, and inflation remained at low levels at 2.7%, which would contrast with that of his successor, Luis Echeverría Álvarez, averaging 15%. Despite said economic growth, income inequality between the country's social classes and urban and rural environments, as well as levels of unemployment, were not contained.

During the presidency of Díaz Ordaz, petrochemicals and electrical service were expanded. The Mexican Petroleum Institute was created, along with eight refinery plants, dams, and communications towers in various parts of the country, eight airports, and a major highway network.

Construction of Mexico City Metro Line 1 was also completed. Díaz Ordaz inaugurated the line on 4 September 1969 with Alfonso Corona del Rosal, the Head of the Department of the Federal District. That morning, Díaz Ordaz became the first passenger of the Mexico City Metro.

==== Role in the 1968 Movement in Mexico ====
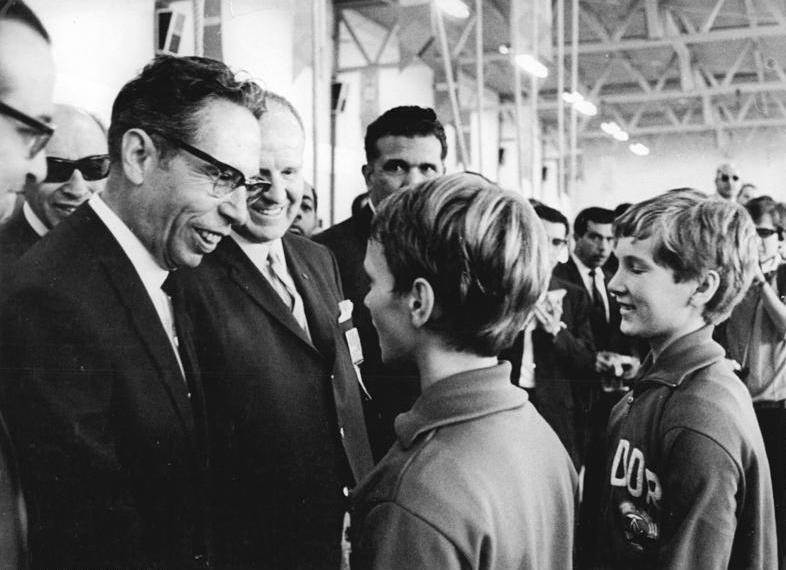
Díaz Ordaz at the 1968 Olympic Games in Mexico.

===== Overview =====
During his mandate, he ordered the repression of social movements, especially student protests such as the 1968 Movement in Mexico. When university students in Mexico City protested the government's actions around the time of the 1968 Summer Olympics, Díaz Ordaz oversaw the occupation of the National Autonomous University of Mexico and the arrest of several students, leading to the shooting of hundreds of unarmed protesters during the Tlatelolco massacre in Downtown Mexico City on 2 October 1968. The Mexican army fired ruthlessly because a group called "Battalion Olympia" started the shooting between the unarmed students and many other people who let the students take shelter inside their homes. Statistics concerning the casualties of this incident vary, often for political reasons. Some people were kept imprisoned for several years. The crackdown would eventually be denounced by Díaz Ordaz's successors, and ordinary Mexicans view the assault on unarmed students as an atrocity. The stain would remain on the PRI for many years.

Every year, on the anniversary of the Tlatelolco massacre, the statue of Díaz Ordaz in Zapopan, Jalisco, is vandalized by having a bucket of red paint splattered on it.

A later investigation by the Mexican prosecutor's office determined that during the government of Díaz Ordaz there were illegal detentions, mistreatment, torture, persecution, forced disappearances, espionage, criminalization, homicides, and extrajudicial executions with the aim of extinguishing the social movement present in Mexico City and some states of the republic.

Although decades later it would become known that this was false, Díaz Ordaz based his actions on the hypothesis of a connection between the student movement and international communism, and that from that sector acts of sabotage against the Olympic Games would be carried out. Díaz provided false information to the Embassy of the United States in Mexico and to that country's Central Intelligence Agency, of which he was an informant. According to this apocryphal version, the movement would lead to a revolution of communist ideology supported by the Soviet Union, Cuba, and China. This version appears in police reports from the Department of the Federal District and the Federal Security Directorate after the clashes of 26 and 27 July 1968, which triggered strong repression against the most visible local communist organizations: the Mexican Communist Party and the Central Nacional de Estudiantes Democráticos, whose offices were raided and whose members were arbitrarily detained on 27 July itself.

Such a hypothesis was known in the United States at least since September 1968. The government of Mexico, with the complicity of the United States, implemented a media campaign to reinforce the idea of the “communist conspiracy” among the population, tending to justify large-scale repression that would then eliminate a movement characterized as a risk to national security and sovereignty.

The Mexican state characterized two sectors of the population, students and communists, as a National Security problem and therefore they had to be treated with the same strategy of persecution and extermination.

— FEMOSPP, "Historical Report Presented to Mexican Society: FEMOSPP Special Prosecutor's Office", p. 24

In his fourth government report on 1 September 1968, Díaz associated social unrest before the Mexican congress with attempts to sabotage the 1968 Summer Olympics. “The youth disorders that have occurred in the world have frequently coincided with the celebration of an important event in the city where they occur; in Punta del Este, Uruguay, before the announcement of the meeting of the presidents of the Americas, student youth were used to provoke serious conflicts.” Therefore, he announced that he would not tolerate any effort to diminish the “splendor” of the Olympic Games. He argued that external causes influenced student actions in the country, since there was a “copying of the slogans used in other countries, the same banners, identical legends, sometimes in simple literal translation, other times in absurd parody”. “He showed himself deeply offended by the occupation of the cathedral and by the raising of a red-and-black banner on the flagpole of the Zócalo”, the then-United States ambassador to Mexico, Fulton Freeman, informed the United States.

The final order given by Díaz Ordaz culminated in the implementation of the military operation called Operation Galeana, which culminated in the massacre at the Plaza de las Tres Culturas (Tlatelolco, Mexico City) on 2 October 1968, thus making him intellectually responsible, together with his Secretaries of the Interior (Luis Echeverría Álvarez) and National Defense (Marcelino García Barragán), for the murder, detention, and disappearance of several hundred students. The operation involved the Secretariat of the Interior, the Mexican Army, the Secret Police, and a paramilitary body formed specifically for the repression of this movement called the Olympia Battalion.

On 1 September 1969, he declared in his fifth government report to Congress:

For my part, I fully assume the personal, ethical, social, legal, political, and historical responsibility for the government's decisions regarding the events of last year.

— Gustavo Díaz Ordaz, 1 September 1969.

His successor to the presidency, Luis Echeverría, declared to Jorge G. Castañeda in the book The Inheritance:

Because when they ask me, “Did you send the soldiers to Tlatelolco?” I always answer: “No, he was the supreme commander, I was not until the first day of December 1970.”

— Luis Echeverría

==== Attempt to democratize the PRI ====
Díaz Ordaz's authoritarian manner of rule also prevented any attempt to democratize the PRI. The president of the PRI, Carlos Madrazo, made such an attempt by proposing inner-party elections in order to strengthen the party's base. After his attempt failed, Madrazo resigned.

=== Foreign policy ===
==== United States ====
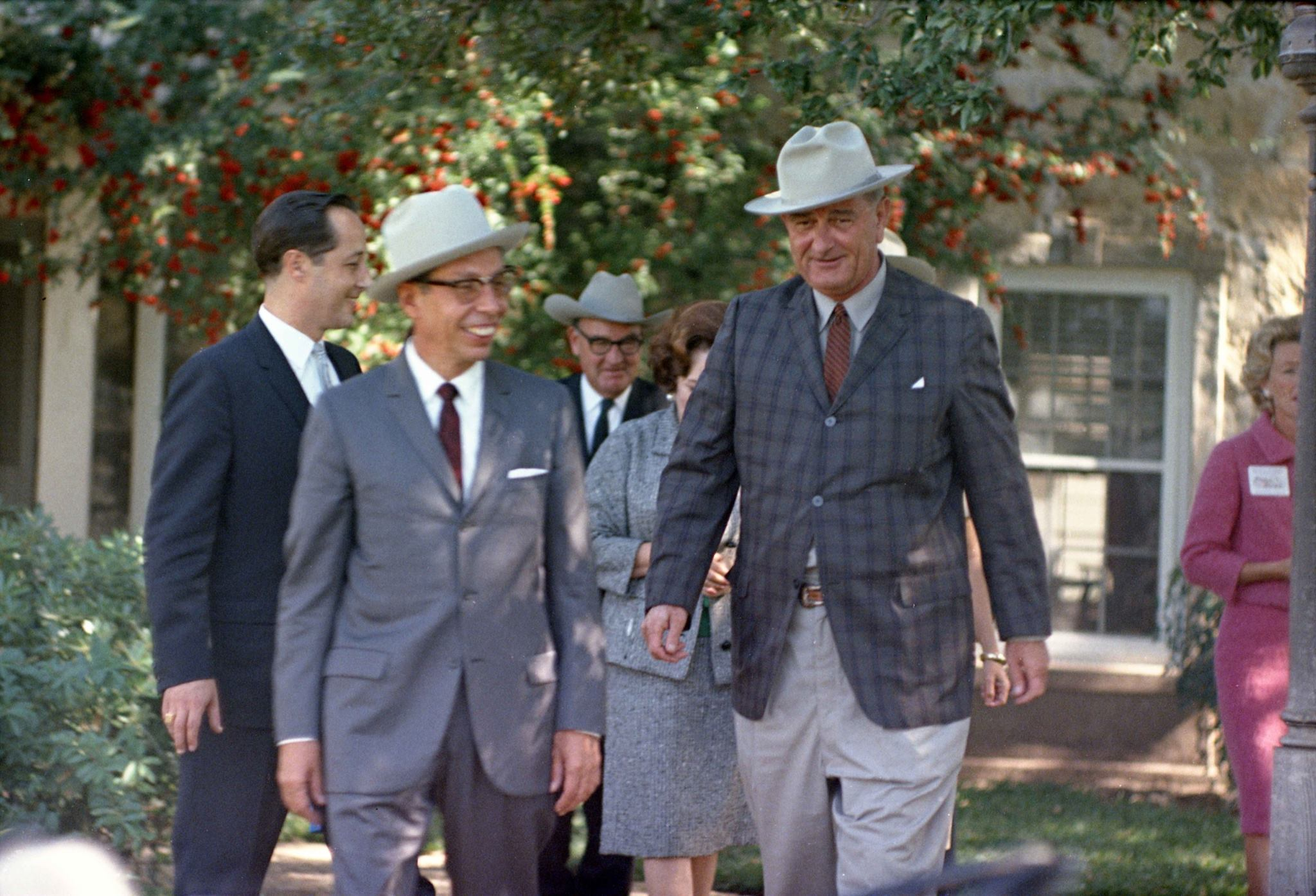
President Díaz Ordaz and President Lyndon Johnson in November 1964.

During the administration of Díaz Ordaz, relations with the US were largely harmonic, and several bilateral treaties were formed. On 8 September 1969, Díaz Ordaz and President Richard Nixon inaugurated the Amistad Dam in Texas. In Díaz Ordaz's honor, President Nixon hosted the first White House state dinner to be held outside Washington, D.C., at San Diego's Hotel del Coronado on 3 September 1970.

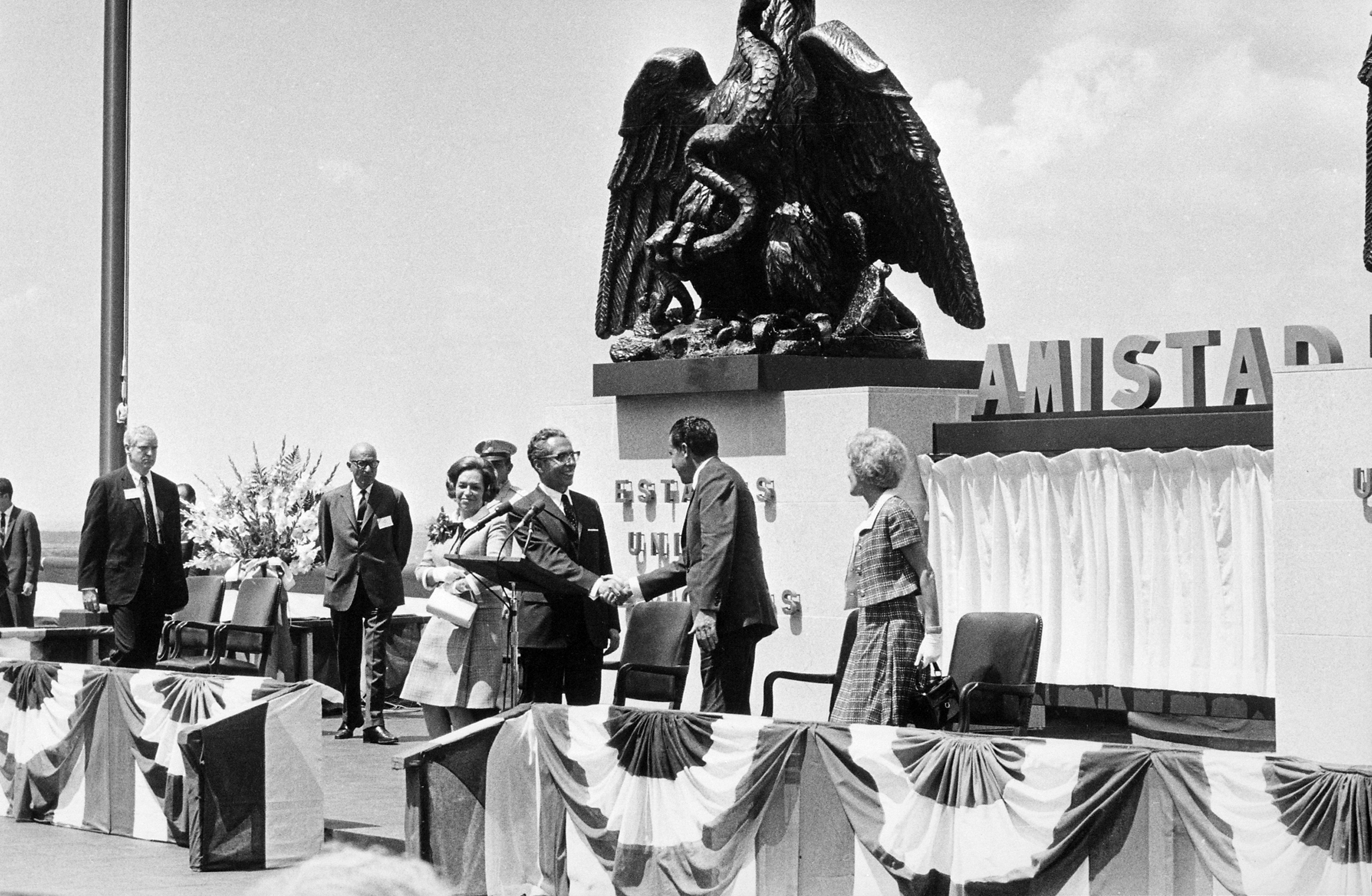
Díaz Ordaz with Richard Nixon at Lake Amistad, August 9, 1969.

However, there also were some points of conflict with the US. One was the antidrug Operation Intercept, conducted by the U.S.; between September and October 1969, all vehicles entering the US from Mexico were inspected. Mexico also embraced the doctrine of nonintervention, and Díaz Ordaz condemned the US invasion of Santo Domingo, the capital of the Dominican Republic.

==== Treaty of Tlatelolco ====
Under his administration, the Treaty of Tlatelolco prohibited the production, possession, or use of nuclear weapons in Latin America. Only peaceful use of nuclear energy was allowed. The treaty made Latin America a nuclear weapon-free zone.

==== Official international trips ====
This is a list of official trips abroad made by Díaz Ordaz during his presidency.

According to Article 88 of the Constitution of Mexico, the president may leave the country for up to seven days by informing the Senate or, where applicable, the Permanent Commission in advance of the reasons for the absence, as well as of the results of the measures carried out. For absences longer than seven days, permission from the Senate or the Permanent Commission is required.

Date	Destination	Main purpose
1964
No official foreign visits
1965
No official foreign visits
1966
10–12 January	Guatemala City (Guatemala)	State visit.
12–14 January	San Salvador (El Salvador)	State visit.
14–16 January	Tegucigalpa (Honduras)	State visit.
16–18 January	Managua (Nicaragua)	State visit.
18–20 January	San José (Costa Rica)	State visit.
20–22 January	Panama City and the Panama Canal Zone (Panama)	State visit.
1967
11–14 April	Montevideo and Punta del Este (Uruguay)	State visit and participation in the Summit of the Organization of American States Heads of State and Government.
26–28 October	Washington, D.C. and El Paso (United States)	State visit and speech before the House of Representatives.
1968
13 December	El Paso (United States)	Official visit for the opening of the López Mateos Channel of the Rio Grande.
1969
No official foreign visits
1970
3 September	Coronado (United States)	Meeting with President Richard Nixon.

=== Presidential succession ===
On 12 October 1969, Díaz Ordaz chose his Secretary of the Interior, Luis Echeverría, as his successor, the seventh successive such selection by a sitting president without incident. Other possible candidates were Alfonso Corona de Rosal, Emilio Martínez Manatou, and Antonio Ortiz Mena. He also considered Antonio Rocha Cordero, governor of the state of San Luis Potosí and former Attorney General, who was eliminated owing to his age (58), and Jesús Reyes Heroles, who was disqualified because a parent had been born outside Mexico, in this case Spain, which was prohibited by Article 82 of the Constitution. In the assessment of political scientist Jorge G. Castañeda, Echeverría was Díaz Ordaz's pick by elimination, not choice.

== Later life ==
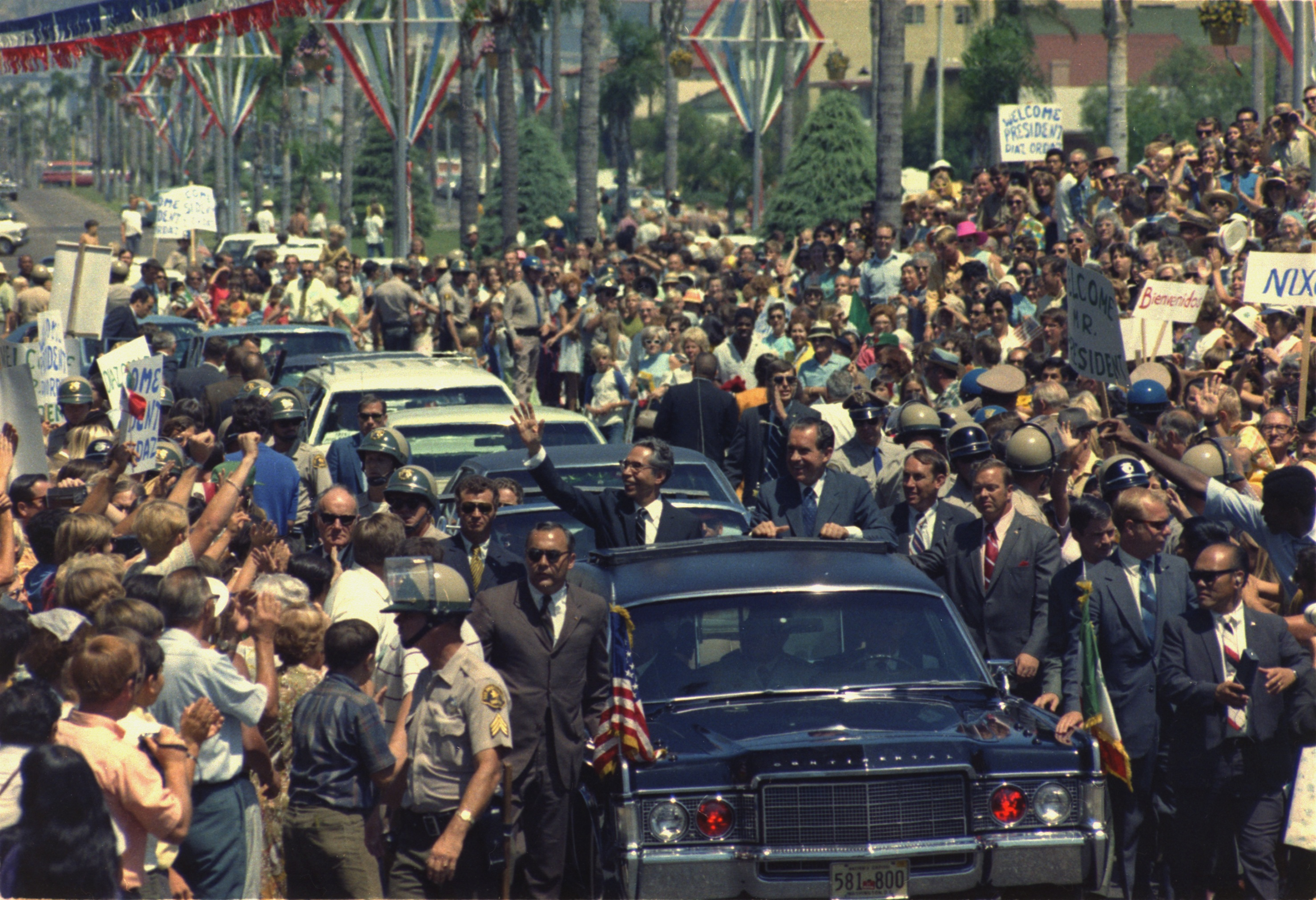
President Gustavo Díaz Ordaz (left) riding a presidential motorcade in San Diego, with US President Richard Nixon

After his term expired, Díaz Ordaz and his family vanished completely from the public eye; he was occasionally mentioned in newspapers (usually in a derogatory manner), he seldom gave interviews, and he was usually spotted only when voting in elections.

In 1977, a break from that obscurity came as he was appointed as the first Mexican Ambassador to Spain in 38 years, relations between the two countries having previously been broken by the triumph of Falangism in the Spanish Civil War. During his brief stint as Ambassador, he met with hostility from both the Spanish media and the Mexican media, as he was persistently asked questions about his actions as president. He resigned within several months because of that and his health problems. Popular discontent led to a catchphrase: "Al pueblo de España no le manden esa araña" ("To the people of Spain, do not send that spider").

Díaz Ordaz became a critic of Luis Echeverría's presidency, particularly his use of populist policies. Díaz Ordaz once referred to Echeverría as someone who was, "out of control. [Echeverría] talks about anything. He doesn't know what he is saying. He insists he's going to make changes, but he doesn't say to what end."

== Death ==
He died on 15 July 1979, aged 68 of colorectal cancer, at home in his bed in Mexico City, with his physician and children Gustavo, Guadalupe, and Ramón all present. His remains were buried at Panteón Jardín, with those of his wife.

== Legacy and public opinion ==
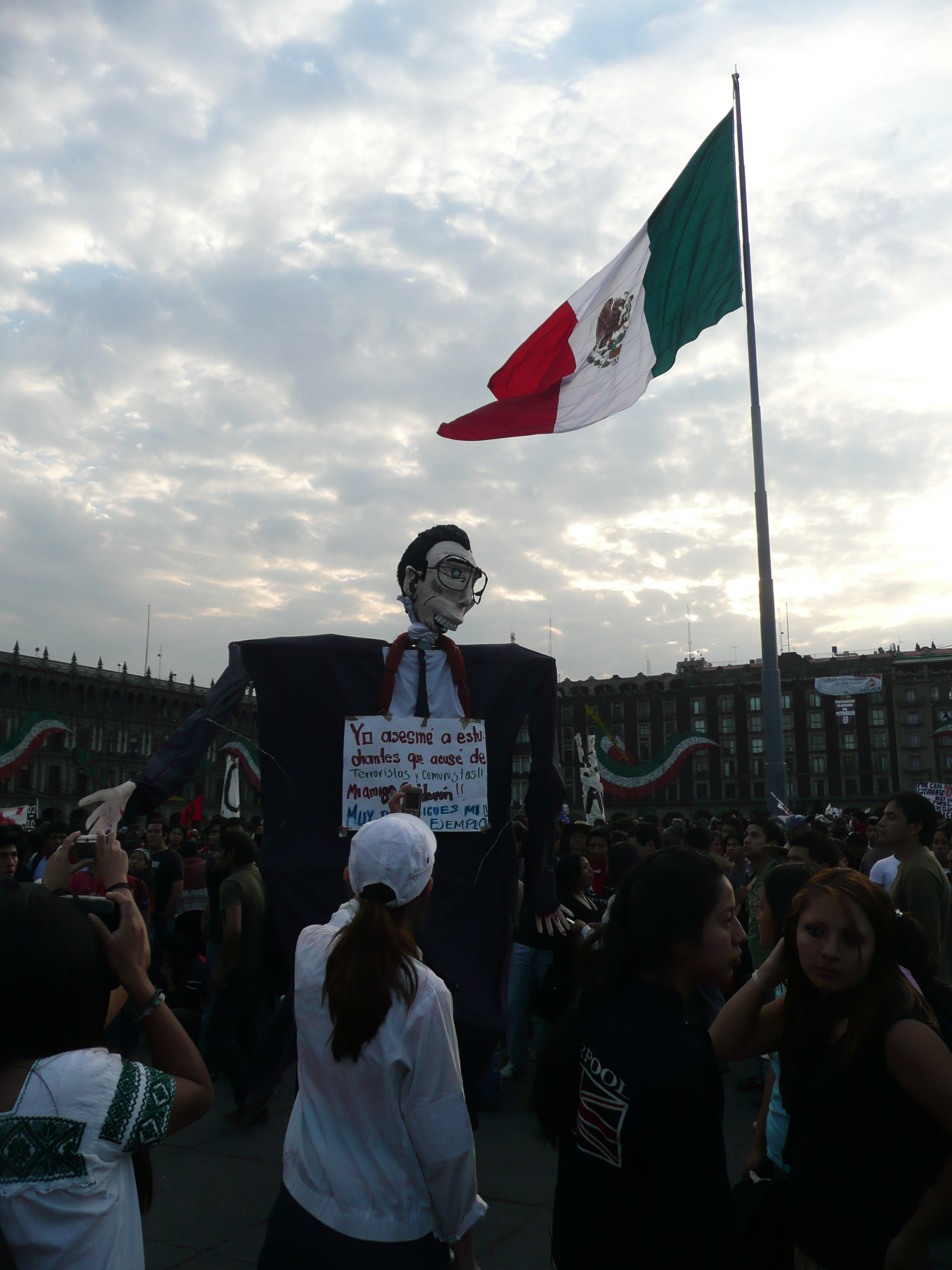
Effigy of Díaz Ordaz at an anti-government protest in 2007. The sign reads "I killed students whom I accused of being communists and terrorists. My friend Calderón, you're following my example very well!" (a reference to the controversial Drug War launched by Calderón's administration).

Licenciado Gustavo Díaz Ordaz International Airport in Puerto Vallarta is named after him.

Public opinion on the Díaz Ordaz administration and its legacy continues to be mostly negative, being associated with the Tlatelolco massacre and a general hardening of authoritarianism that would prevail during successive PRI administrations. Even during his lifetime, his appointment as Ambassador to Spain in 1977 was met with such rejection and protests that he had to resign shortly after.

In a national survey conducted in 2012, 27% of the respondents considered that the Díaz Ordaz administration was "very good" or "good", 20% responded that it was an "average" administration, and 45% responded that it was a "very bad" or "bad" administration.

In 2018, the Government of Mexico City retired all plaques from the Mexico City Subway system making reference to Díaz Ordaz that were installed during his administration.

== See also ==
- List of heads of state of Mexico

Political offices
Preceded by Adolfo López Mateos	President of Mexico; 1964–1970	Succeeded by Luis Echeverría
Party political offices
Preceded by Adolfo López Mateos	PRI presidential candidate 1964 (won)	Succeeded by Luis Echeverría Álvarez
Diplomatic posts
Preceded by Adalberto Tejeda Olivares	Mexican Ambassador to Spain; 1977	Succeeded by José Gómez Gordóa
