= Pedro Acosta (disambiguation) =

Pedro Acosta (born 2004) is a Spanish motorcycle racer.

Pedro Acosta may also refer to:

- Pedro Acosta (footballer) (born 1959), Venezuelan football manager and former player
- Pedro César Acosta (1936–2009), Mexican politician
