= Enrique Caballero Peraza =

Mexican politician, physician and psychologist

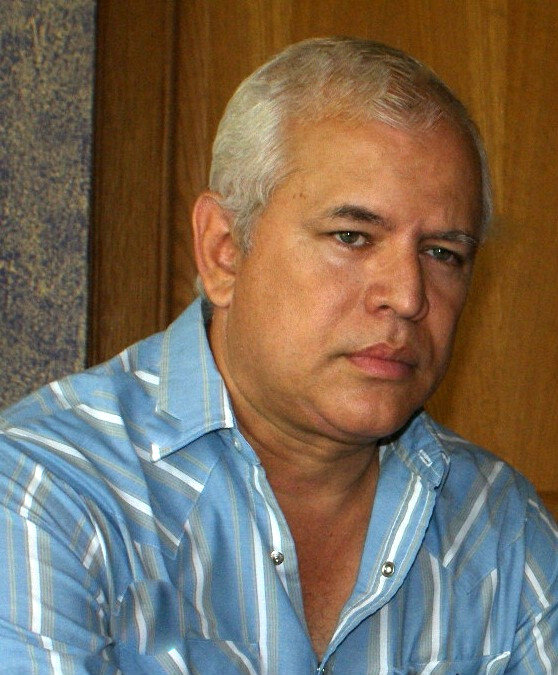

Member of the Chamber of Deputies
- In office 1 December 1991 – 30 November 1994
- Preceded by: Tere Cortés Cervantes
- Succeeded by: Max Tejeda Martinez

Member of the Congress of Guerrero
- In office 15 November 1996 – 14 November 1999
- Leader: Florencio Salazar Adame
- Preceded by: Cecilia Sánchez de la Barquera
- Succeeded by: Angel Pasta Muñúzuri

President of National Action Party (Mexico) in the state of Guerrero
- In office 1 November 1990 – 15 February 1997
- Preceded by: Carmelo Piña Sandoval
- Succeeded by: Miguel Angel Flores Mesino

Personal details
- Born: 27 October 1959 (age 66) Acapulco, Guerrero, Mexico
- Party: PAN
- Spouse: Cecilia Sánchez de la Barquera (m. 1982)
- Children: 3
- Education: Universidad La Salle; National Autonomous University of Mexico
- Profession: Politician, Physician, Psychologist

Military service
- Branch/service: Mexican Navy
- Years of service: 1982-1983

Enrique Caballero Peraza (born 27 October 1959) is a Mexican politician, physician and psychologist. He served in the LV Legislature of the Chamber of Deputies.

== Family ==
He is the youngest son of politician Enrique Caballero Aburto (1905–1975) and poet Yolanda Peraza Guzmán (1926–2006). He was also the nephew of the ex-governor of Guerrero Raúl Caballero Aburto.

He is the father of Enrique Caballero Maldonado, born 1985, son of Carolina Maldonado Arroyo (1956–2008) and of Daniela Caballero Sánchez de la Barquera, born 1988, and of Alexander Caballero Sánchez de la Barquera, born 1995, children of Cecilia Sánchez de la Barquera (1962–2005).

The paternal family (Caballero-Aburto) descends from Luis Caballero Galán, the bastard son of the controversial one Archbishop-Viceroy Antonio Caballero.

== Political activities ==
As a member of the National Action Party (PAN), he served as a federal deputy in the LV Legislature of the Chamber of Deputies from 1991 to 1994 and as a local deputy in the Congress of Guerrero from 1996 to 1999. He also ran for municipal president of Acapulco in 1996.

In July 2004, he registered as his party's pre-candidate for the governorship of Guerrero ahead of the 2005 elections.

Internally in National Action Party he was President of the Party in the State of Guerrero by a period of 6 years. (1990–1997), Member of the Council in the State and also National and member of the National Executive Committee that was chaired by Carlos Castillo Peraza (1993–1996).

== Education ==
He made his professional studies in the Mexican Medicine Faculty of Universidad La Salle and in the Faculty of Psychology of National Autonomous University of Mexico. Their studies of postgraduate were made in the Mexican Association of Dynamic Psychotherapy. Later he did their studies in Theory and Political Analysis as well as Political Philosophy, were made respectively in the Institute of Legislative Investigations of the UNAM, and in the Foundation Antonio Gramsci, in coordination with the UNAM and Autonomous University of Guerrero.

== Current activities ==
At the moment he is dedicated to his private practice and to teaching, even though it maintains entailment with the National Action of Party, in the federal electoral process of 2006, he was Operative Coordinator of Campaign in the presidential campaign of Felipe Calderón in the State of Oaxaca. In the 2009 federal electoral process, he was Operative Coordinator of Campaign, with National Action Party in Oaxaca.
