= 1958 Mexican general election =

6 July 1958
- Presidential election
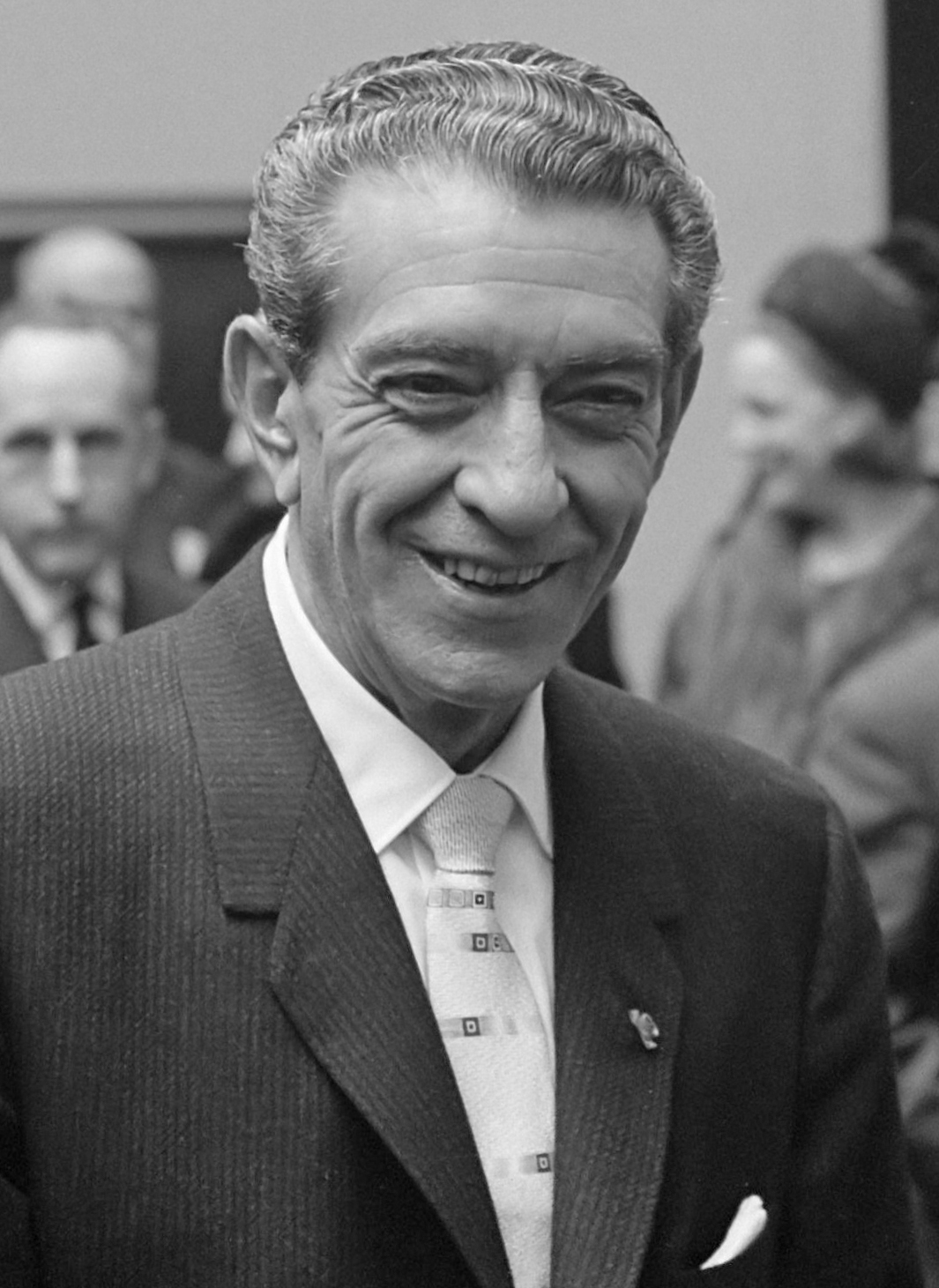

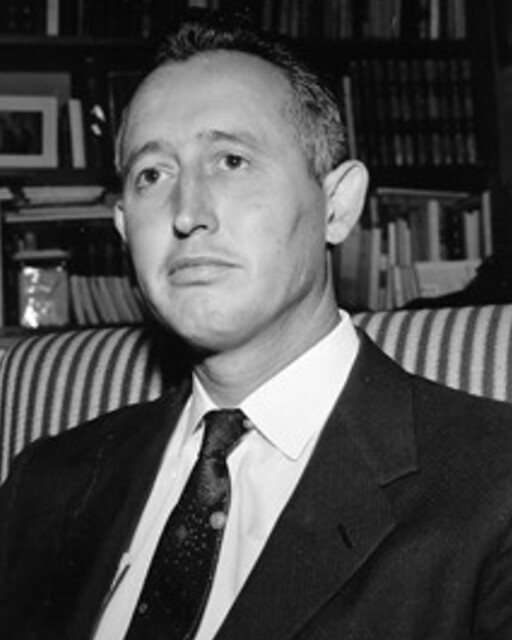
Nominee	Adolfo López Mateos	Luis Héctor Álvarez
Party	PRI	PAN
Popular vote	6,767,754	705,303
Percentage	90.44%	9.42%
President before election
Adolfo Ruiz Cortines
PRI
Elected President
Adolfo López Mateos
PRI

General elections were held in Mexico on 6 July 1958. The presidential elections were won by Adolfo López Mateos, who received 90.4% of the vote. In the Chamber of Deputies election, the Institutional Revolutionary Party (PRI) won 153 of the 162 seats. These were the first Mexican presidential elections in which women were allowed to vote.

== Campaign ==
During a campaign stop at the municipality of Jalpa, Zacatecas, the presidential candidate of the National Action Party (PAN), Luis H. Álvarez, was arrested and imprisoned for a couple of hours; according to Álvarez, the charge that was brought against him was "being a member of the opposition".

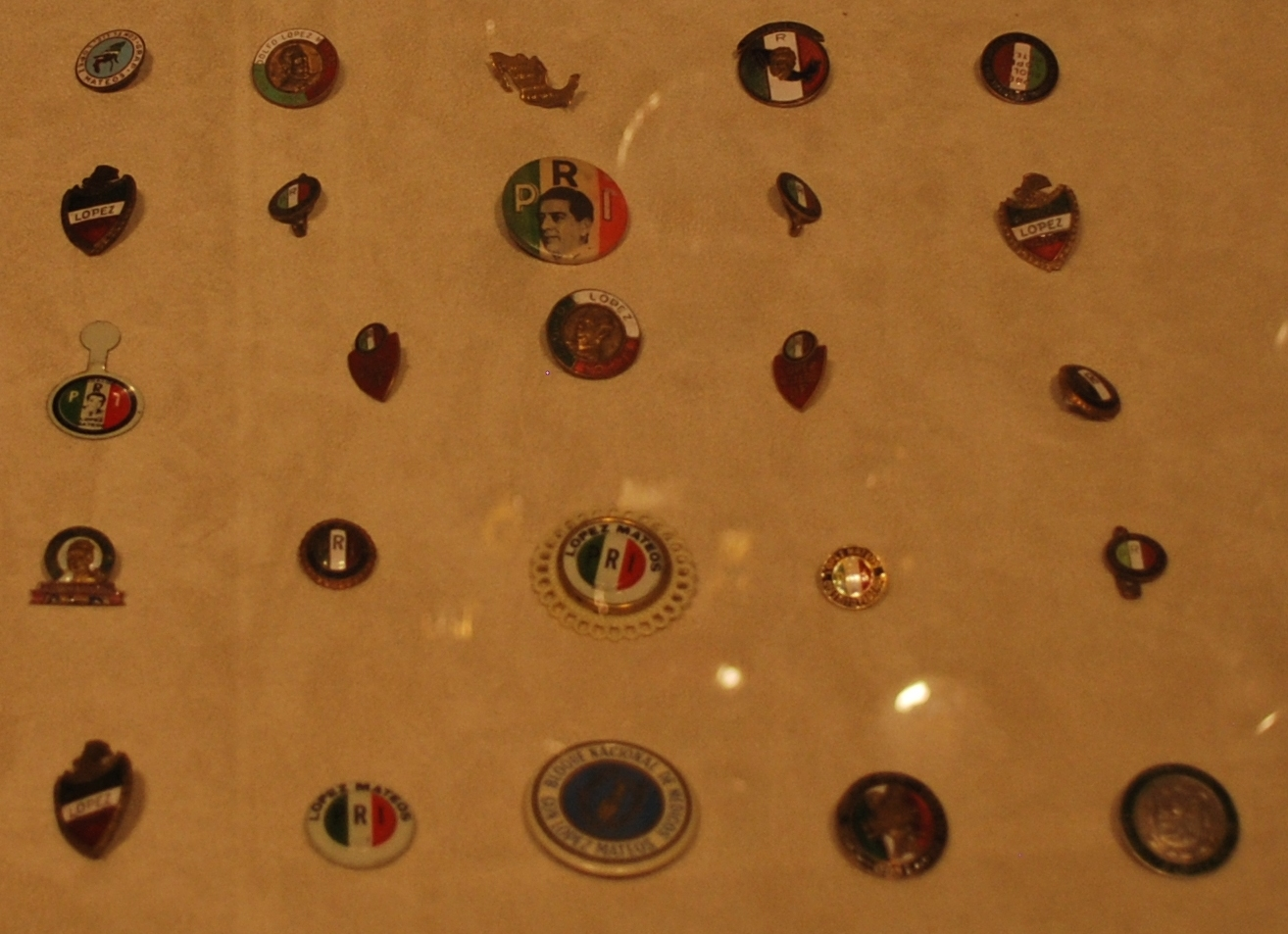
López Mateos campaign buttons.

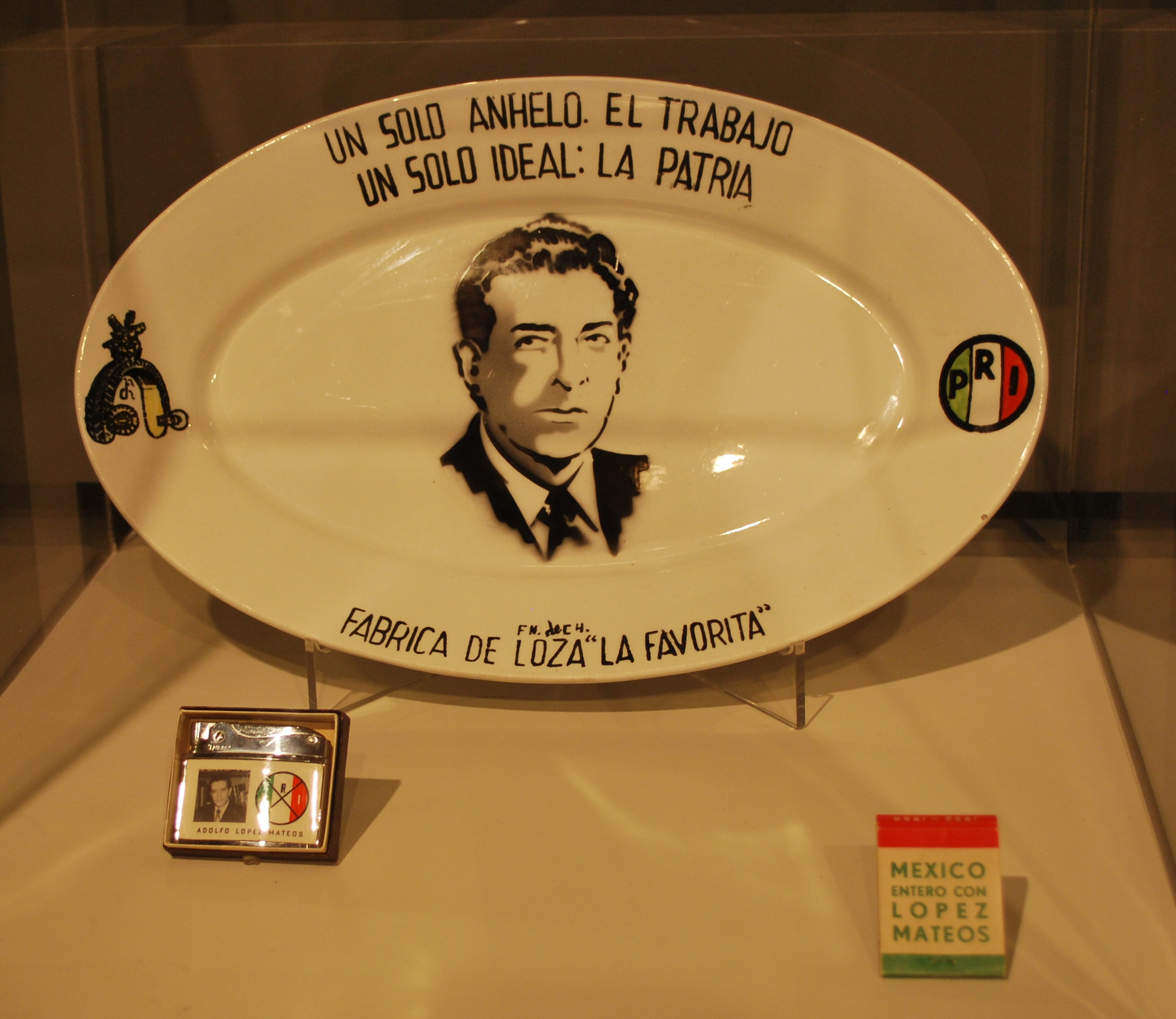
López Mateos campaign plate and other items.

== Results ==
=== President ===
Candidate	Party	Votes	%
Adolfo López Mateos	Institutional Revolutionary Party	6,767,754	90.44
Luis H. Álvarez	National Action Party	705,303	9.42
Other candidates		10,346	0.14
Total		7,483,403	100.00
Registered voters/turnout		10,443,465	–
Source: Nohlen

=== Chamber of Deputies ===
Party	Votes	%	Seats	+/–
Institutional Revolutionary Party (PRI)	6,467,493	88.20	153	0
National Action Party (PAN)	749,519	10.22	6	0
Popular Socialist Party (PPS)	50,145	0.68	1	–1
Authentic Party of the Mexican Revolution (PARM)	32,464	0.44	1	New
Nationalist Party of Mexico (PNM)	22,499	0.31	1	0
Non-registered candidates	10,309	0.14	0	New
Total	7,332,429	100.00	162	0
Registered voters/turnout	10,443,465	–		
Source: Nohlen, UNAM
