= Adolfo Christlieb Ibarrola =

Mexican politician (1919–1969)

President of the National Action Party
- In office 1962–1968
- Preceded by: José González Torres
- Succeeded by: Ignacio Limón Maurer

Personal details
- Born: 12 March 1919 Mexico City, Mexico
- Died: 6 December 1969 (aged 50) Mexico City, Mexico
- Party: National Action Party
- Spouse: Hilda Morales (m. 1940)
- Children: 7
- Education: National Autonomous University of Mexico

Adolfo Christlieb Ibarrola (12 March 1919 – 6 December 1969) was a Mexican lawyer and politician from Mexico City and former President of the National Action Party (Spanish: Partido Acción Nacional) (PAN).

== Education & teaching ==
Christlieb Ibarrola completed his primary studies at the Colegio Puente de Alvarado and his secondary studies at Colegio Frances Morelos. Following his primary and secondary studies, Christlieb Ibarrola went on to study at the School of Philosophy and Letters at the National Autonomous University of Mexico (Spanish: Universidad Nacional Autónoma de México) (UNAM). Between the years of 1937 and 1939 he became an adviser to the school. From 1939 to 1945, Christlieb Ibarrola returned to Colegio Frances Morelos as a Professor of Mexican History. On 27 August 1941, Christlieb Ibarrola completed his law degree from the National School of Law, UNAM, later returning in 1954 as a Professor of Constitutional Law.

== Partido Acción Nacional ==
Adolfo Christlieb Ibarrola's career in politics is centered around his membership and rise within PAN. His personal relationships with numerous founders; Manuel Gómez Morín, Efraín González Luna, Agustin Aragon, and Gustavo Molina Font, put him at the founding of the political organization. Christlieb Ibarrola was originally offered membership in 1939, he declined, however he did assist in collecting the required signatures for the certification of the political organization. In 1958 Christlieb Ibarrola finally joined PAN, beginning his rise.

As a member of PAN he is most recognized for moving the opposition party into a more favorable area, adopting a more cooperative style with the government then the aggressive electoral competition the Christian Democratic parties engaged in. Christlieb Ibarrola believed PAN should follow the Christian Democratic model, however not bring PAN into a fully clerical party. PAN's new cooperative attitude with the government scored it some successes; in 1963 President Adolfo López Mateos supported introduction of proportional representation through party congress-representative system; Chamber of Deputies produced PAN advocated legislation on federal electoral law, government regulations, foreign investment and labor laws. Christlieb Ibarrola is quoted as saying: "contact with public officials enables [one] to understand and resolve national demands with greater agility". In 1962 Christlieb Ibarrola was elected to the position of National Executive Committee (CEN) President of PAN, where he served until 1968, stepping down due to the onset of cancer. Christlieb Ibarrola has served on the following committee's and held the listed positions below:

- Federal Congressman, Federal District, dist 23, 1964–1967
- Leader of PAN delegation to congress – 1964
- President of the National Executive Committee (CEN) of PAN 1962-1968
- Member of foreign trade committee
- Member of legislative studies committee
- Member of second government committee
- Member of committee on mines

== Published writings ==
Adolfo Christlieb Ibarrola has written the following published works:

- Monopolio Educativo o Unidad Nacional, un problema de México (Editorial Jus, 1962);
- Solidaridad y Participación (Ediciones de Acción Nacional, 1962);
- Temas Políticos (Ediciones de Acción Nacional, 1964);
- Crónicas de la No-Reelección (Ediciones de Acción Nacional, 1965);
- La Oposición (Ediciones de Acción Nacional, 1965);
- Inversiones Extranjeras en México (Ediciones de Acción Nacional, 1965);
- Discurso para Conmemorar la Instalación del Congreso Constituyente (Ediciones de Acción Nacional, 1966);
- Acción Nacional, presencia viva de la juventud (Ediciones de Acción Nacional, 1967);
- Baja California, avanzada de la democracia (Ediciones de Acción Nacional, 1968);
- Las Razones de la Sinrazón (Compilación, EPESSA, 1987);
- Escritos Periodísticos (Compilación, EPESSA, 1994);
- Ideas Fuerza (Compilación, EPESSA, 1999).

Preceded by José González Torres	President of the National Action Party; 1962–1968	Succeeded by Ignacio Limón Maurer
