= National Action Party Jalisco =

Branch of Mexican political party

National Action Party Jalisco is a state branch of the National Action Party (Mexico), founded in Jalisco in 1939 by Efrain González Luna. The National Action Party (Mexico) was founded in Mexico City in 1939. González Luna had been an important leader of the Unión Nacional de Estudiantes Católicos (UNEC), a Jesuit-founded student group that had effectively opposed socialist education at the National Autonomous University of Mexico (UNAM) in the early 1930s. Leaders of UNEC, along with the rector of UNAM, Manuel Gómez Morín who had opposed socialist education went on to found the National Action Party in 1939. González Luna was a prolific writer, publishing on a variety of topics concerning political action and Mexican Catholicism.

The party is organized in district, municipal and state committees. Formerly, when the PRI ruled Mexico as the dominant party, like the axis of the Mexican political scheme, the PAN Jalisco was a truly opposition party, made up of urban professionals such as physicians, dentists, lawyers, accountants and small businesspeople. It had a unique democratic system to vote for party officials and leaders, as well as choosing who was considered the right candidates for general and midterm elections.

In 2008, it was the main political party of Jalisco: it controls politics in the State as it has won most of political spaces in public elections since 1995. Currently the State Governor, city majors of the capital area (Guadalajara, Zapopan, Tonala and Tlaquepaque) and the majority of Congressmen come from this party.

== History ==
In 1995, the party was described in the New York Times as a great challenge in Jalisco to the rule of President Ernesto Zedillo Ponce de León.

After few years of finally gaining the main post of the state of Jalisco, the Governorship to Alberto Cárdenas in 1995, the party began to lose some of its democratic credentials. In fact, with more elections won, most of newcomers within time won spaces in municipal administrations, Congress and even jobs in the State Governmental bodies.
