= 1964 Mexican general election =

- 5 July 1964
- Presidential election
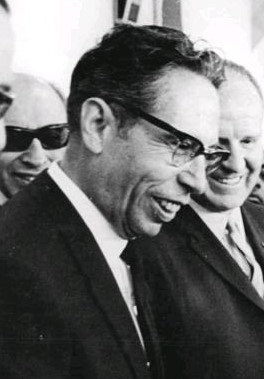

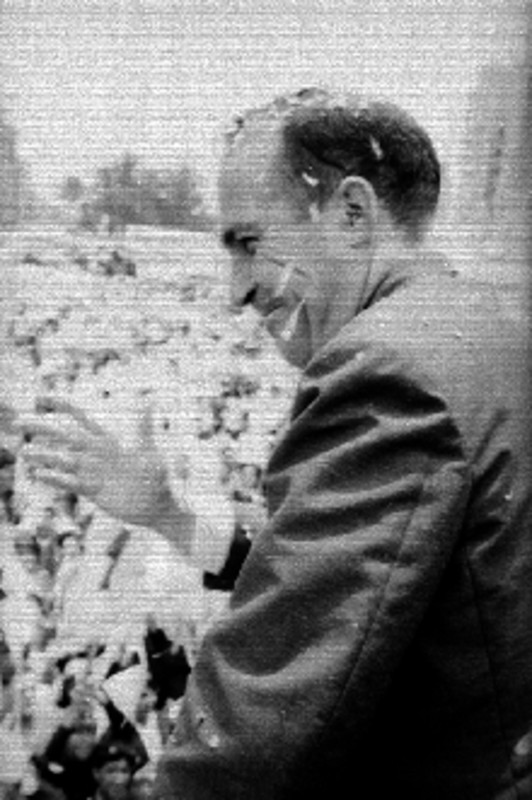
Nominee	Gustavo Díaz Ordaz	José González Torres
Party	PRI	PAN
Popular vote	8,368,446	1,034,337
Percentage	88.82%	10.98%
- Votes for Gustavo Díaz Ordaz by state: 70–80% 80–90% 90–100%
President before election
Adolfo López Mateos
PRI
Elected President
Gustavo Díaz Ordaz
PRI

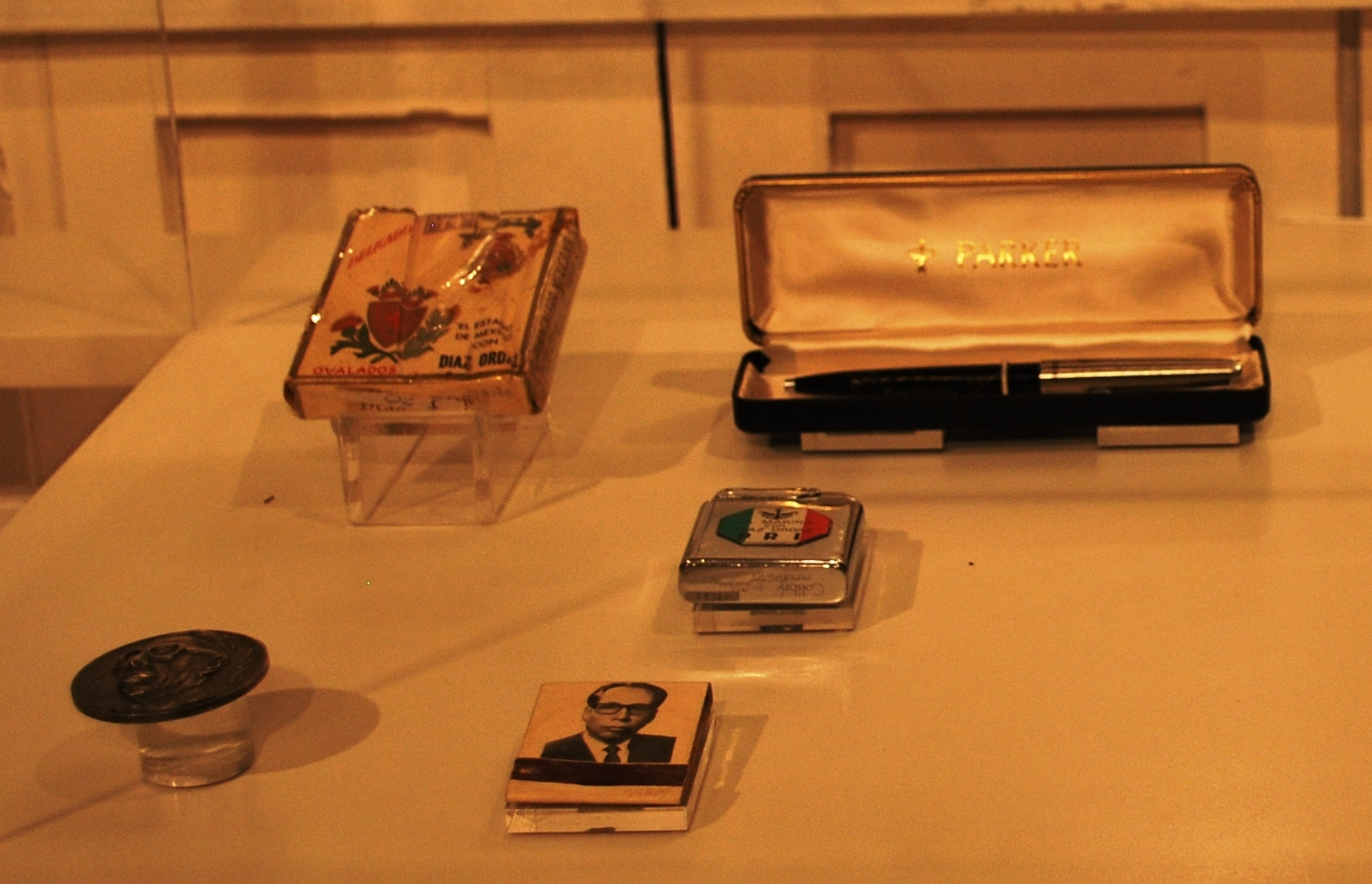
Díaz Ordaz campaign items

General elections were held in Mexico on 5 July 1964. The presidential elections were won by Gustavo Díaz Ordaz, who received 89% of the vote. In the Chamber of Deputies election, the Institutional Revolutionary Party won 175 of the 210 seats.

The elected deputies served from 1964 to 1967 (46th Congress) while the senators served from 1964 to 1970 (46th and 47th Congresses).

The 1964 election was the first to use the party deputy mechanism: a form of proportional representation through which three parties other than the hegemonic Institutional Revolutionary Party (PRI) – none of which won any first-past-the-post districts – were allocated 32 seats.

== Results ==
=== President ===
Candidate	Party	Votes	%
Gustavo Díaz Ordaz	Institutional Revolutionary Party	8,368,446	88.82
José González Torres	National Action Party	1,034,337	10.98
Other candidates		19,402	0.21
Total		9,422,185	100.00
Registered voters/turnout		13,589,594	–
Source: Nohlen

==== By State ====
State	Díaz Ordaz (PRI + PARM + PPS)		González Torres (PAN)		Total
State	Votes	%	Votes	%	Total
Aguascalientes	67.338	91.26%	6.453	8.74%	73.791
Baja California	142.948	78.59%	38.946	21.41%	181.894
Baja California Sur	25.975	96.91%	827	3.09%	26.802
Campeche	56.811	95.96%	2.394	4.04%	59.205
Chihuahua	223.952	79.34%	58.332	20.66%	282.284
Coahuila	247.125	93.41%	17.436	6.59%	264.561
Colima	34.613	87.45%	4.967	12.55%	39.580
Durango	206.653	86.41%	32.490	13.59%	239.143
Federal District	1.061.862	74.90%	355.798	25.10%	1.417.660
Guanajuato	333.521	79.62%	85.350	20.38%	418.871
Guerrero	385.251	97.01%	11.867	2.99%	397.118
Hidalgo	339.873	98.43%	5.407	1.57%	345.280
Jalisco	512.957	87.05%	76.328	12.95%	589.285
Michoacán	335,805	86.12%	54,116	13.88%	389,911
Morelos	110.361	94.24%	6.740	5.76%	117.101
Nayarit	70.698	92.56%	5.679	7.44%	76.377
Nuevo León	220.568	84.41%	40.733	15.59%	261.301
Oaxaca	432.773	96.64%	15.036	3.36%	447.809
Puebla	519.146	93.81%	34.275	6.19%	553.421
Querétaro	101.996	91.30%	9.725	8.70%	111.721
Quintana Roo	16.954	96.99%	526	3.01%	17.480
San Luis Potosí	259.682	91.30%	24.757	8.70%	284.439
Sinaloa	209.828	98.09%	4.084	1.91%	213.912
Sonora	155.277	98.46%	2.424	1.54%	157.701
State of Mexico	463.269	91.74%	54.116	8.26%	504.969
Tabasco	146.654	99.38%	914	0.62%	147.568
Tamaulipas	290.026	96.61%	10.185	3.39%	300.211
Tlaxcala	100.834	98.30%	1.740	1.70%	102.574
Veracruz	660.419	96.81%	21.759	3.19%	682.178
Yucatán	177.794	85.93%	29.106	14.07%	206.900
Zacatecas	141.426	79.29%	36.942	20.71%	178.368
Total	8.384.515	87.69%	1.040.718	10.98%	9.444.645
Source: CEDE

=== Senate ===
Party	Votes	%	Seats
Institutional Revolutionary Party	7,837,364	87.83	60
National Action Party	1,001,045	11.22	0
Popular Socialist Party	57,617	0.65	0
Authentic Party of the Mexican Revolution	13,007	0.15	0
Non-registered candidates	13,968	0.16	0
Total	8,923,001	100.00	60
Registered voters/turnout	13,589,594	–	
Source: Nohlen, Sachs

=== Chamber of Deputies ===
Party	Votes	%	Seats	+/–
Institutional Revolutionary Party	7,807,912	86.26	175	+3
National Action Party	1,042,396	11.52	20	+15
Popular Socialist Party	123,837	1.37	10	+9
Authentic Party of the Mexican Revolution	64,409	0.71	5	+5
Non-registered candidates	12,970	0.14	0	0
Total	9,051,524	100.00	210	+32
Registered voters/turnout	13,589,594	–		
Source: Nohlen
