= Carlos Castillo Peraza =

Mexican politician

Carlos Enrique Castillo Peraza (Mérida, Yucatán, April 17, 1947 – Bonn, Germany, September 8, 2000) was an intellectual, journalist and Mexican politician, member of the National Action Party (PAN) of which he was the 15th President from 1993 to 1996.

Carlos Castillo Peraza was a lawyer at the University of Fribourg, Switzerland, was a collaborator and contributor of many newspapers of the country and began as journalist in El Diario de Yucatán. From 1967 he became a member of the PAN and occupied an ample variety of positions in his local and national structure. During their management as National President of the PAN, their nearer collaborators were Jesus Galván Muñoz, ex-president Felipe Calderón, Enrique Caballero and Luis Correa Mena.

In 1980 and 1988, he was candidate to Governor of Yucatán and in 1984 to Municipal President of Mérida, he was elect Federal Deputy to the LIV Legislature and National President of the PAN and in 1997 he became a candidate of the Head of Government of the Federal District and being third in the elections, when finishing this process moved away officially of the policy and resigned to its active militancy in the PAN dedicating itself to academic activities until his passing. He died in from a sudden heart attack in his sleep, since he was attending an invitation from Konrad Adenauer Foundation in Bonn, Germany.

In 2007 he was awarded (post mortem) the Belisario Domínguez Medal of Honor.

== See also ==
- National Action Party

Party political offices
Preceded by Luis H. Álvarez	President of the National Action Party; 1993–1996	Succeeded by Felipe Calderón
Awards
Preceded by Jesús Kumate Rodríguez	Belisario Domínguez Medal of Honor; 2007	Succeeded by Miguel Ángel Granados Chapa
