= Luis H. Álvarez =

Mexican politician

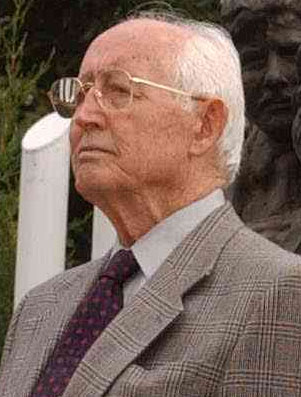

Senator of the Congress of the Union
- In office 1 September 1994 – 31 August 2000
- Succeeded by: Jorge Doroteo Zapata

Director General of the National Institute of Indigenous Peoples
- In office 15 December 2006 – 31 December 2009
- President: Felipe Calderón
- Preceded by: Xóchitl Gálvez Ruiz
- Succeeded by: Xavier Abreu Sierra

President of the National Action Party
- In office 9 March 1987 – 9 March 1993
- Preceded by: Pablo Emilio Madero
- Succeeded by: Carlos Castillo Peraza

Mayor of Chihuahua
- In office 9 March 1983 – 9 March 1986
- Preceded by: Ramiro Cota Martínez
- Succeeded by: Pedro César Acosta

Personal details
- Born: Luis Héctor Álvarez; October 25, 1919 Camargo, Chihuahua, Mexico
- Died: May 18, 2016 (aged 96) León, Guanajuato, Mexico
- Party: National Action Party
- Spouse: Blanca Magrassi Scagno (m. 1947; died 2015)
- Education: University of Texas at Austin
- Occupation: Businessman

Luis Héctor Álvarez Álvarez (October 25, 1919–May 18, 2016) was a Mexican industrialist and politician. Álvarez was a member of the National Action Party. In 1958 he was a candidate for the Presidency of Mexico. He also served as Mayor of Chihuahua, president of his party and was the coordinator of the dialogues for peace in Chiapas.

== Political career ==
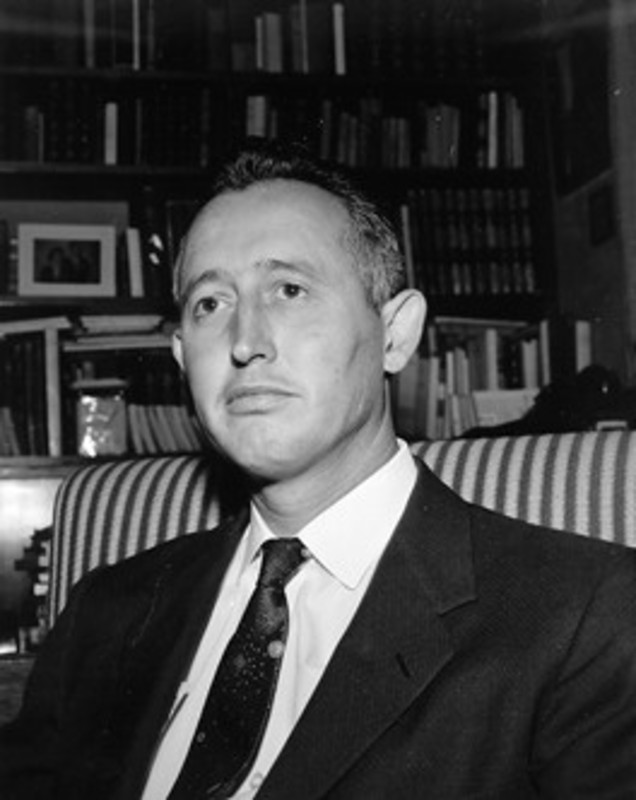
Álvarez candidate for president in 1958.

Luis Héctor Álvarez dedicated most of his life to the textile industry. He first became involved in politics in Ciudad Juárez. In 1956 the PAN nominated him as candidate to Governor of Chihuahua. He lost the election to PRI candidate Teófilo Borunda. After the election an electoral fraud was claimed by Álvarez and his party. In an act of civil disobedience, Alvarez headed a caravan from Chihuahua to Mexico City. In 1958, he ran as the PAN candidate in the federal election against Adolfo López Mateos where he lost.

=== Municipal President of Chihuahua ===
In the following years Álvarez dedicated himself mainly to his private enterprise, until 1983 when he was elected Municipal President of Chihuahua. As an opposition figure, Álvarez constantly clashed with the state and federal governments. Álvarez claimed he was not given the proper legal resources and participation in his city's decisions. In protest, Álvarez started a hunger strike that lasted 40 days. The strike also contested the 1986 elections in Chihuahua in which opposition parties claimed an electoral fraud had taken place once again.

=== PAN party president ===
In 1987 he was elected 14th president of the PAN party and in 1990 he won the re-election. His tenure as president of the party is controversial. His supporters claim that during his administration the party became the strongest opposition force in Mexican politics. His detractors on the other hand claim that his party strayed away from its original doctrine and was now run by the “neo-panistas” (e.g. Manuel Clouthier, Vicente Fox, Francisco Barrio Terrazas and Ernesto Ruffo Appel). Prominent party members, including Pablo Emilio Madero, Jesus González Schmal, Jose González Torres and Bernardo Bátiz, left the PAN in protest arguing that Álvarez's policy of dialogue with Carlos Salinas de Gortari legitimized his government which was under intense national criticism of perpetrating an electoral fraud.

=== Senate ===
He was elected to the Senate for Chihuahua from 1994 to 2000, during which period he served as a member of the Commission of Concord and Pacification in Chiapas that was in charge of the peace negotiation between the Federal Government and the Zapatista Army of National Liberation. In 2000, President Vicente Fox designated him Coordinator of the Dialogue for La Paz in Chiapas. During this time he never was able to contact the leadership of the EZLN.

On December 15, 2006, President Felipe Calderón Hinojosa designated him head of the Commission for the Development of the Indigenous People.

== Family ==
Álvarez's wife, Blanca Magrassi Scagno, an activist and important figure within the PAN, died on October 9, 2015, at the age of 92.

Party political offices
Preceded by Efraín González Luna	PAN presidential candidate 1958 (lost)	Succeeded by José González Torres
Preceded by Pablo Emilio Madero	President of the National Action Party; 1987–1993	Succeeded by Carlos Castillo Peraza
Awards
Preceded by Javier Barros Sierra	Recipient of the Belisario Domínguez Medal of Honor; 2010	Succeeded by Cuauhtémoc Cárdenas
