= Pedro César Acosta =

Mexican politician (1936–2009)

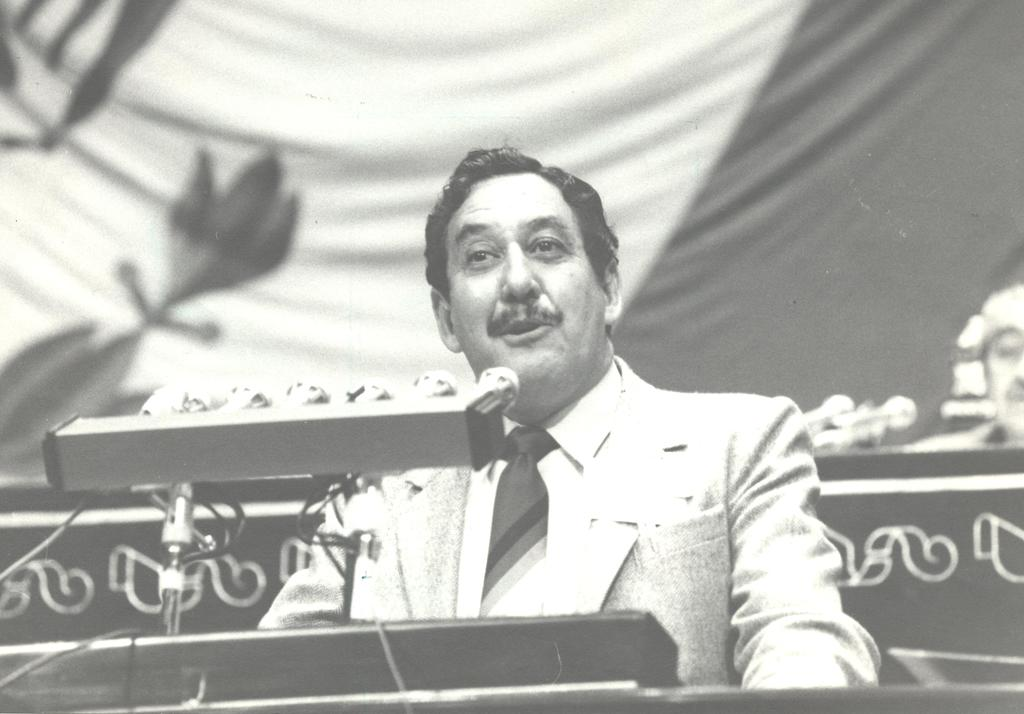
Pedro César Acosta in the Chamber of Deputies, 1988.

Pedro César Acosta Palomino (30 September 1936 – 18 May 2009) was a Mexican politician who was a member of the National Action Party (PAN). He served as a plurinominal federal deputy and as municipal president of Chihuahua in 1986.

== Biography ==
Pedro César Acosta was born on 30 September 1936, in Nuevo Casas Grandes, Chihuahua, from where he later emigrated to study as a normal teacher in city of Chihuahua. Later he relocated to Mexico City where he studied public accounting at the National Autonomous University of Mexico (UNAM). He later returned to the state of Chihuahua where he practiced his profession, working as a teacher in various schools as well as an accountant in multiple companies in the private sector.

In 1963 he joined the National Action Party, and in 1986 he was municipal president of Chihuahua after Luis H. Álvarez requested a leave of absence. In 1988 he was a candidate for federal deputy: he lost to the candidate of the Institutional Revolutionary Party but was elected deputy by the multi-member route for the 54th Congress, during which he served as adviser to the legislative power in the General Council of the Federal Electoral Institute in 1991.

In 1992 he was elected deputy to the LVII Legislature of the Congress of Chihuahua by multi-member route, being coordinator of the first bench with a PAN majority in the Congress of Chihuahua. He was president of the Municipal Steering Committee of the PAN in Chihuahua on one occasion as well as a state and national councilor on several occasions.

He died on 18 May 2009 in the city of Chihuahua at the age of 72.
