= Pablo Emilio Madero =

Mexican politician

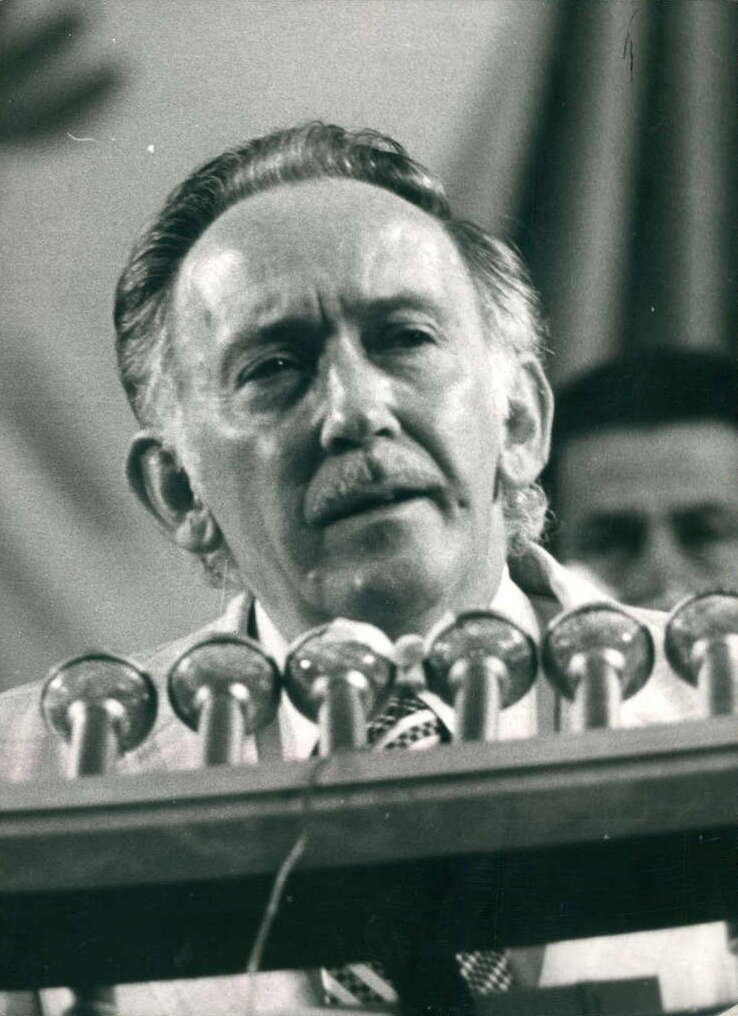

President of the National Action Party
- In office 1984–1987
- Preceded by: Abel Vicencio Tovar
- Succeeded by: Luis H. Álvarez

Member of the Chamber of Deputies Proportional representation
- In office 1 November 1991 – 31 October 1994
- In office 1 September 1979 – 31 August 1982

Personal details
- Born: Pablo Emilio Madero Belden; August 3, 1921 San Pedro, Coahuila, Mexico
- Died: March 16, 2007 (aged 85) Monterrey, Nuevo León, Mexico
- Party: Mexican Democratic Party (1994-1997)
- Other political affiliations: National Action Party (1939-1991)
- Spouse: Norma Morelos Zaragoza Luquin
- Children: 8
- Education: National Autonomous University of Mexico

Pablo Emilio Madero Belden (August 3, 1921 – March 16, 2007) was a Mexican politician. He was the 13th president of the National Action Party (PAN, 1984–1987) and a presidential candidate who represented both the PAN and the defunct Mexican Democratic Party (Partido Demócrata Mexicano, PDM).

Pablo Emilio Madero Belden was the son of General Emilio Madero González and Mercedes Belden Gutiérrez. He graduated as a chemical engineer from the National Autonomous University of Mexico in 1945 as a Sugar and Oil specialist. Six years earlier, in 1939, he had joined the National Action Party (PAN) on December 6, 1939, as a youth group member, an institution he represented twice in the Chamber of Deputies (1979–1982 and 1991–1994, as a plurinominal deputy on both occasions) and presided both locally and nationally before leaving it in the early 1990s. He was Vice-President of the National Transformation Industry Chamber (CANACINTRA) and President of the Glass Producers Association of Latin America, among other positions.

Madero Belden left the PAN in 1991. In the 1994 general election, he stood as the presidential candidate of the Mexican Democratic Party but he lost with 97,935 votes or 0.28 percent of the total vote.

Madero Belden was married to Norma Morelos Zaragoza Luquin, with whom he had eight children: Norma Alicia, Pablo, Marcela, Leticia, Mercedes, Mónica, Guillermo and Jorge.

In 2007 Pablo Emilio Madero died at the age of 85, in Monterrey, Nuevo León.

Party political offices
Preceded by No candidate in 1976; Efraín González Morfín in 1970	PAN presidential candidate 1982 (lost)	Succeeded by Manuel Clouthier
Preceded by Abel Vicencio Tovar	President of the National Action Party; 1984–1987	Succeeded by Luis H. Álvarez
