= José González Torres =

Mexican politician (1919–1998)

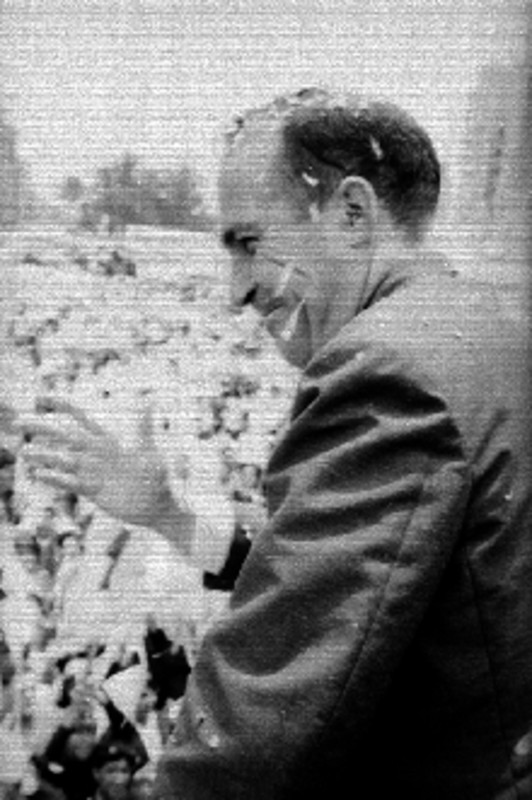
- González Torres during his campaign for the presidency of Mexico in 1964.

Member of the Chamber of Deputies Proportional representation
- In office 1 September 1982 – 31 August 1985

President of the National Action Party
- In office 1958–1962
- Preceded by: Alfonso Ituarte Servín
- Succeeded by: Adolfo Christlieb Ibarrola

Personal details
- Born: 16 September 1919 Cotija de la Paz, Mexico
- Died: 1 November 1998 (aged 79) Cancún, Mexico
- Party: National Action Party
- Education: National Autonomous University of Mexico; Escuela Libre de Derecho

José González Torres (Note: In this name that follows Hispanic American naming customs, the first or paternal surname is González and the second or maternal family name is Torres.) (16 September 1919 – 1 November 1998) was a Mexican politician, lawyer, and president of the National Action Party.

== Biography ==
González Torres was born on 16 September 1919 in Cotija de la Paz, Michoacán. He studied from primary to high school in the city of Guadalajara. In the 1940s, González Torres moved to Mexico City, where he studied law at the National Autonomous University of Mexico (UNAM), graduating as a lawyer in 1945. He was a history professor at the Escuela Libre de Derecho in Mexico City.

From 1947 to 1949, he was world president of the Catholic international organization Pax Romana, based in Geneva, Switzerland. In 1963, the former chaplain of Pax Romana–Italia, Giovanni Battista Montini, was elected Pope of the Catholic Church, taking the name Paul VI.

From 1949 to 1952, he was president of Mexican Catholic Action.

He was General Secretary of the National Action Party between 1956 and 1958, and president of the party from 1959 to 1962.

In the 1964 general election, he was the party's candidate for the presidency.

In the 1982 general election, he was elected to a plurinominal seat in the Chamber of Deputies, where he served during the 52nd Congress (1982–1985).

Pope Pius XII named him a Knight of the Order of St. Gregory and the Order of the Holy Sepulchre.

In 1988, he received an honorary doctorate in canon law from the Salesian Pontifical University of Rome.

He died on 1 November 1998 in Cancún, Quintana Roo, aged 79.

== Notes ==
Preceded by Alfonso Ituarte Servín	President of the National Action Party; 1958–1962	Succeeded by Adolfo Christlieb Ibarrola
