= National Action Party (Mexico) =

Mexican political party

National Action Party Partido Acción Nacional
- Abbreviation: PAN
- President: Jorge Romero Herrera
- Secretary-General: Michel González Márquez
- Senate leader: Guadalupe Murguía Gutiérrez
- Chamber leader: Noemí Luna Ayala
- Founder: Manuel Gómez Morín... and others (Note: Gómez Morín founded the National Action Party of Mexico along with Roberto Cossío y Cosío, Juan Landerreche Obregón, Daniel Kuri Breña, Juan José Páramo Castro, Bernardo Ponce, Francisco Fernández Cueto, Carlos Ramírez Zetina and Enrique Manuel Loaeza Garay.)
- Founded: 16 September 1939; 87 years ago
- Headquarters: Av. Coyoacán No. 1546 Col. Del Valle, Benito Juárez, Mexico City
- Newspaper: La Nación
- Youth wing: Acción Juvenil
- Membership (2026): ▲366,104
- Ideology: National conservatism Christian democracy
- Political position: Centre-right to right-wing
- Religion: Roman Catholicism
- Regional affiliation: Christian Democrat Organization of America
- Electoral alliance: Fuerza y Corazón por México
- International affiliation: Centrist Democrat International
- Colours: Blue White
- Slogan: Patria, familia y libertad (Homeland, family and freedom)
- Anthem: "Himno de Acción Nacional" (lit. 'Anthem of National Action')
- Chamber of Deputies: 69 / 500
- Senate: 21 / 128
- Governorships: 4 / 32
- State legislatures: 161 / 1,123
- Mayors: 226 / 2,052

Website
- www.pan.org.mx

The National Action Party (Spanish: Partido Acción Nacional, PAN) is a conservative political party in Mexico founded in 1939. It is one of the main political parties in the country, and, since the 1980s, has had success winning local, state, and national elections.

In the historic 2000 Mexican general election, PAN candidate Vicente Fox was elected president, the first time in 71 years that the Mexican presidency was not held by the traditional ruling party, the PRI. Six years later, PAN candidate Felipe Calderón succeeded Fox after winning the 2006 presidential election. In the 2006 legislative elections, the party won 207 out of 500 seats in the Chamber of Deputies and 52 out of 128 senators. In the 2012 legislative elections, the PAN won 38 seats in the Senate and 114 seats in the Chamber of Deputies, but the party did not win the presidential election in 2012, 2018, or 2024. The members of this party are colloquially called panistas.

Notably, the two presidents elected as PAN candidates (Vicente Fox and Felipe Calderón) have both left the party. Fox supported Institutional Revolutionary Party presidential candidates in 2012 and 2018, while Calderón founded his own party called México Libre, Fox eventually rejoined the party in 2021.

== History ==
=== 20th century ===
==== Founding ====
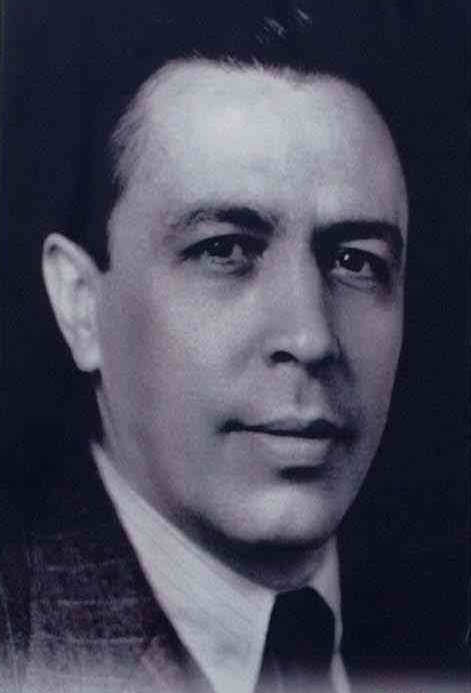
Manuel Gómez Morín, founder of the PAN in 1939

The National Action Party was founded in 1939 by Manuel Gómez Morín, who had held a number of important government posts in the 1920s and 1930s. He saw the need for the creation of a permanent political party rather than an ephemeral organization to oppose the expansion of power by the post-revolutionary Mexican state. When Gómez Morín was rector of UNAM between 1933 and 1935, the government attempted to impose socialist education. In defending academic freedom, Gómez Morín forged connections with individuals and groups that later came together in the foundation of the PAN in September 1939. The Jesuit student organization, Unión Nacional de Estudiantes Católicos (UNEC), provided a well-organized network of adherents who successfully fought the imposition of a particular ideological view by the state. Gómez Morín was not himself a militant Catholic, but he was a devout believer who rejected liberalism and individualism. In 1939, Gómez Morín and a significant number of UNEC's leadership came together to found the PAN. The PAN's first executive committee and committees on political action and doctrine also had former Catholic student activists, including Luis Calderón Vega, the father of Felipe Calderón, who became President of Mexico in 2006. The PAN's "Doctrine of National Action" was strongly influenced by Catholic social doctrine articulated in Rerum novarum (1891) and Quadragesimo anno (1931) and rejected Marxist models of class warfare. The PAN's newspaper, La Nación was founded by another former UNEC member, Carlos Séptien García.

Efraín González Luna, a former member of the Mexican Catholic Student Union (Unión Nacional de Estudiantes Católicos) (UNEC), a long-time militant Catholic and practicing lawyer from Guadalajara, helped broker the party's informal alliance with the Catholic Church. However, the relationship between the PAN and the Catholic Church was not without tension. The party's founder Gómez Morín was leery of clerical oversight of the party, although its members were mainly urban Catholic professionals and businessmen. For its part, the Church hierarchy did not want to identify itself with a particular political party, since the Constitution of 1917 forbade it. In the 1950s, the PAN, which had been seen to be Catholic in its makeup, became more ideologically secular.

==== Electoral results ====
The PAN initially was a party of "civic example", an independent loyal opposition that generally did not win elections at any level. However, in the 1980s it began a transformation to a political power, beginning at the local and state levels in the North of Mexico. A split in the PAN occurred in 1977, with the pro-Catholic faction and the more secular wing splitting. The PAN had updated its positions following the Second Vatican Council, toward a greater affinity for the poor; however, more traditional Catholics were critical of that stance and nonreligious groups were also in opposition, since they wanted the party to be less explicitly Catholic and draw in more urban professionals and business groups, who would vote for a nonreligious opposition party. The conflict came to a head, and in 1977 the progressive Catholic wing left the party.

The PAN had strength in Northern Mexico and its candidates had won elections earlier on, but these victories were small in comparison to those of the Institutional Revolutionary Party. In 1946, PAN members Miguel Ramírez Munguía (Tacámbaro, Michoacán), Juan Gutiérrez Lascurain (Federal District), Antonio L. Rodríguez (Nuevo León) and Aquiles Elorduy García (Aguascalientes) became the first four federal deputies from the opposition in post-revolutionary Mexico. The following year, Manuel Torres Serranía from Quiroga, Michoacán became the party's first municipal president and Alfonso Hernández Sánchez (from Zamora, Michoacán) its first state deputy. In 1962, Rosario Alcalá (Aguascalientes) became the first female candidate for state governor and two years later Florentina Villalobos Chaparro (Parral, Chihuahua) became the first female federal deputy. In 1967, Norma Villarreal de Zambrano (San Pedro Garza García, Nuevo León) became the first female municipal president.

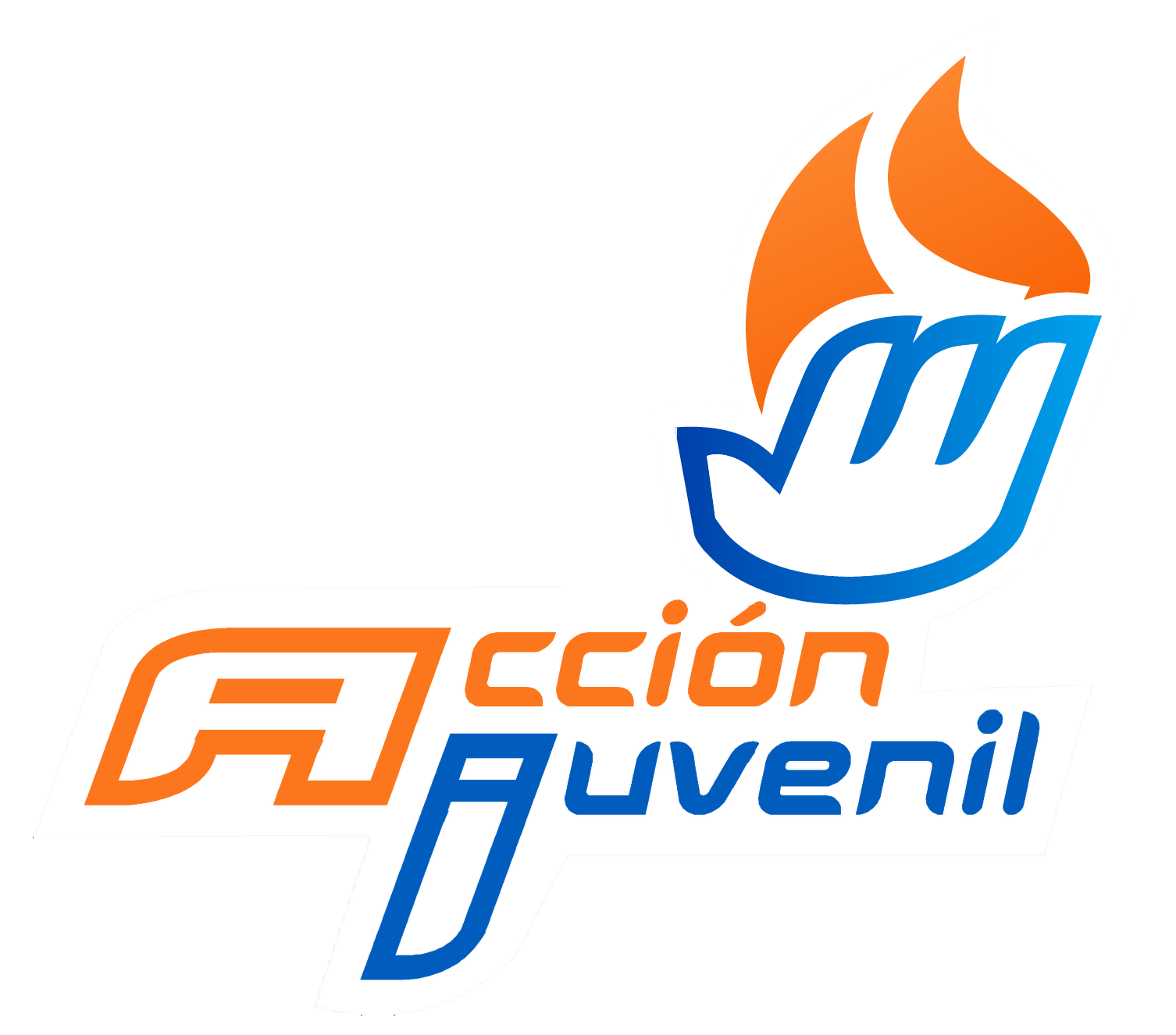
Acción Juvenil official logo

Until the 1980s, the PAN was a weak opposition party that was considered pro-Catholic and pro-business, but never garnered many votes. Its strength, however, was that it was pro-democracy and pro-rule of law, so that its political profile was in contrast to the dominant Institutional Revolutionary Party (PRI) that was widely and increasingly seen as corrupt. The PAN came to be viewed as viable opposition party for a wider range of voters as it became more secular and as Mexicans increasingly moved to cities. As the PAN increasingly called for end of fraud in Mexican elections, it appealed to a wider range of people.

In 1988, the newly created Assembly of Representatives of the Federal District had, for the first time, members of the PAN. In 1989, Ernesto Ruffo Appel (Baja California) became the first opposition governor. Two years later, his future successor in the Baja California government, Héctor Terán Terán, became the first federal senator from the PAN. From 1992 to 2000, PAN candidates won the elections for governorships in Guanajuato, Chihuahua, Jalisco, Querétaro, Nuevo León, Aguascalientes, Yucatán and Morelos.

=== 21st century ===
==== Electoral victory for the presidency, 2000 ====
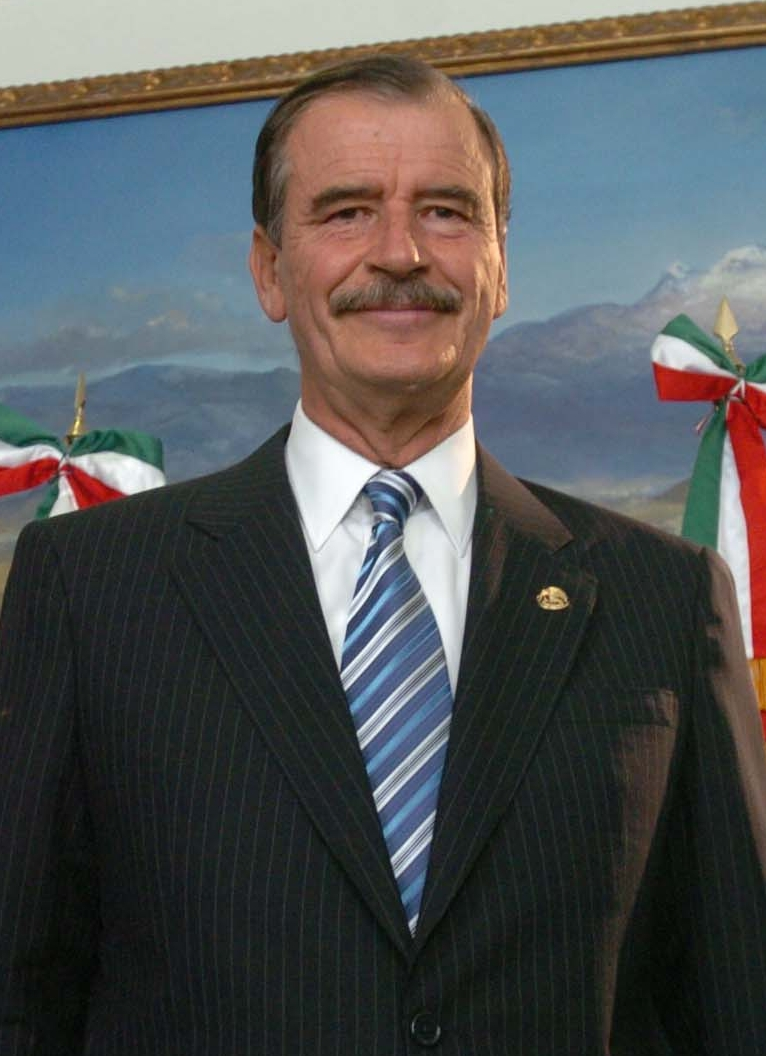
Vicente Fox, the first PANista to be elected president of Mexico (2000–06), ended more than 70 years of PRI rule.

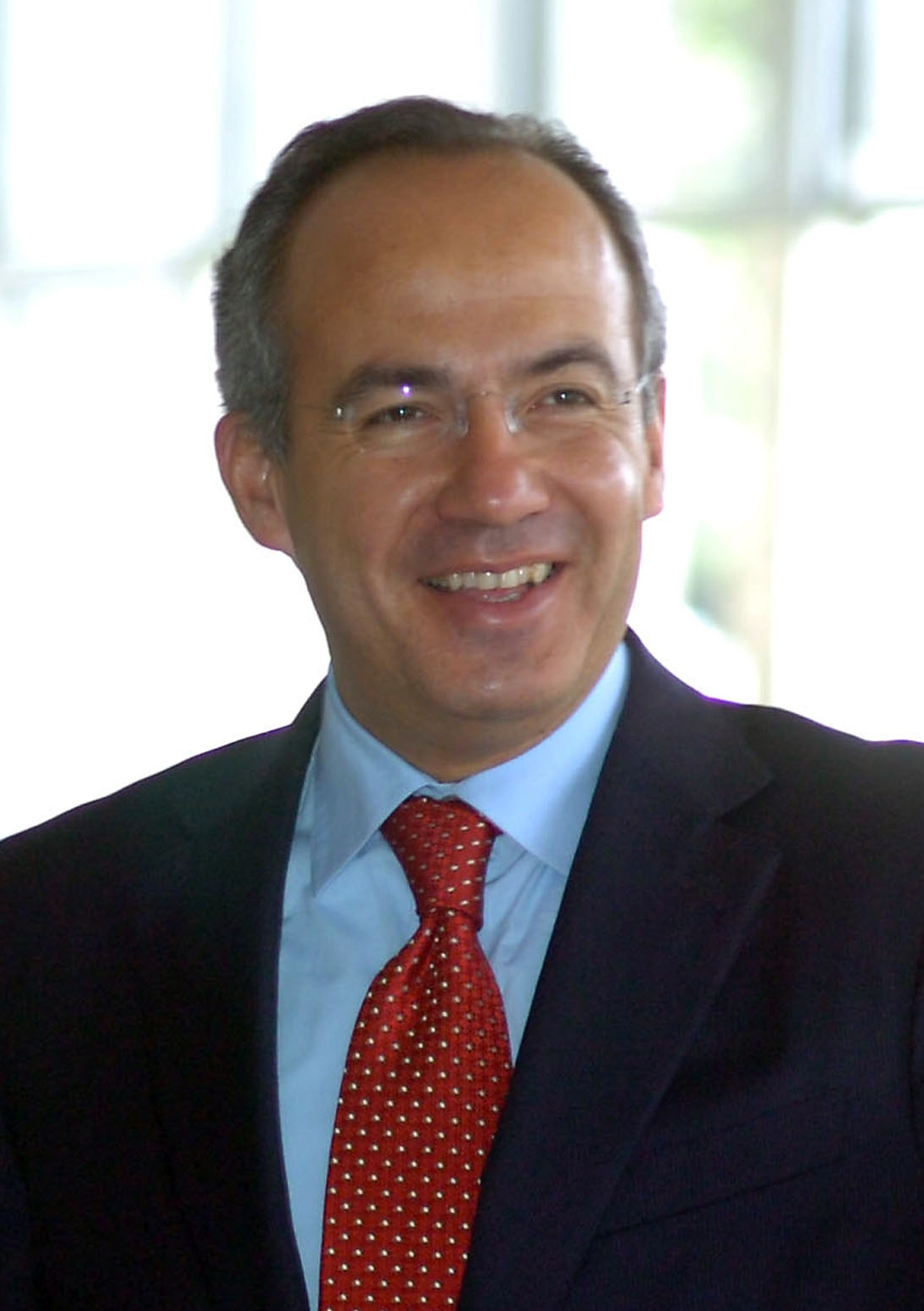
Felipe Calderón, President of Mexico (2006–12)

In the 2000 presidential elections, the candidate of the Alianza por el Cambio ("Alliance for Change"), formed by the PAN and the Ecologist Green Party of Mexico (PVEM), Vicente Fox Quesada won 42.5% of the popular vote and was elected president of Mexico. Fox was the first opposition candidate to defeat the candidate of the Institutional Revolutionary Party (PRI) and its precursors after 71 years. It was a significant victory not only for the PAN, but Mexican democracy.

In the senate elections of the same date, the Alliance won 46 out of 128 seats in the Senate. The Alliance broke off the following year and the PVEM has since participated together with the PRI in most elections.

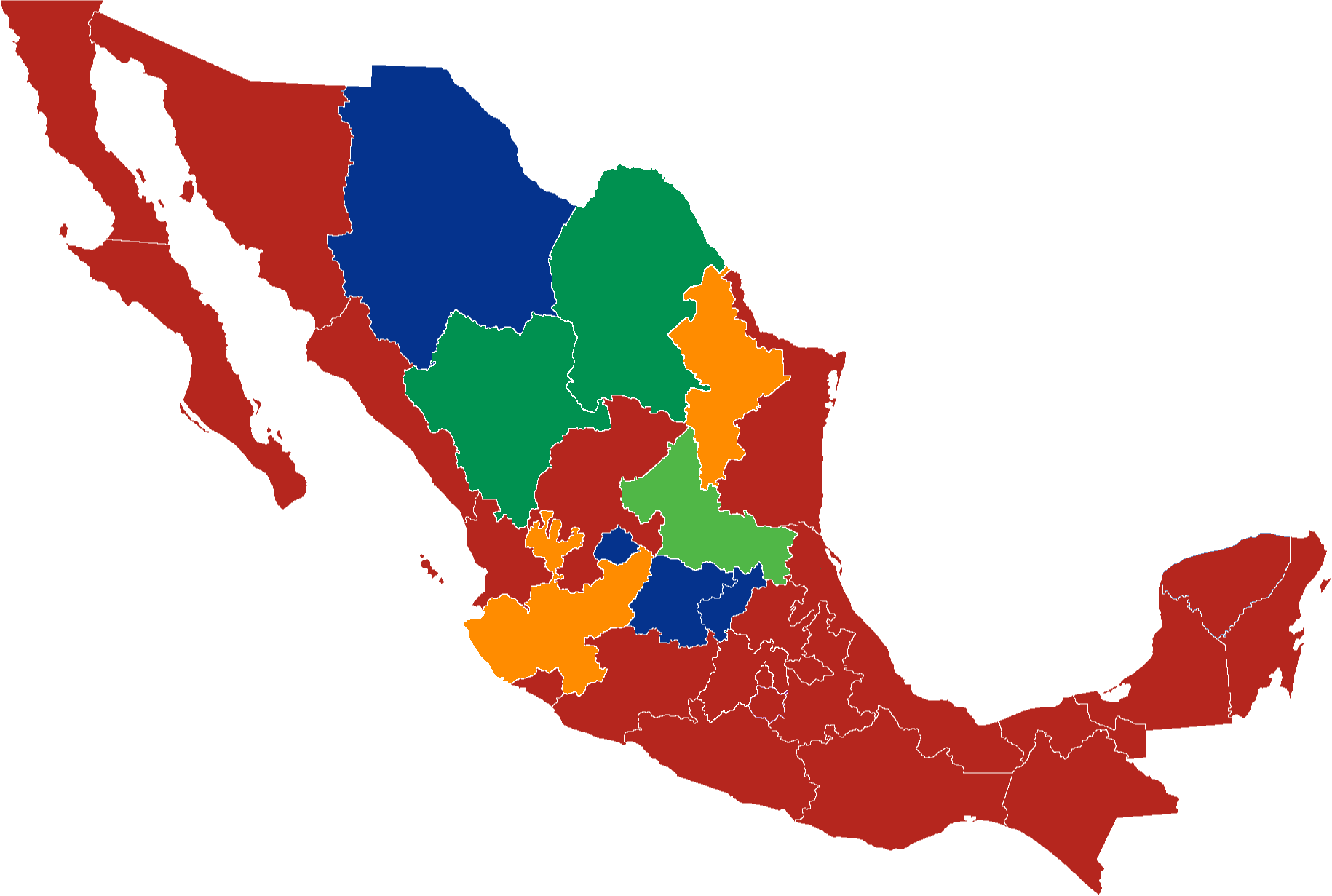
States governed by the PAN (2026)

In the 2003 mid-term elections, the party won 30.74% of the popular vote and 153 out of 500 seats in the Chamber of Deputies. In 2003, the PAN lost the governorship of Nuevo León to the PRI and, the following year, failed to win back the state of Chihuahua from the PRI. Coupled with a bitterly fought election in Colima that was cancelled and later re-run, these developments were interpreted by some political analysts to be a significant rejection of the PAN in advance of the 2006 presidential election. In contrast, 2004 did see the PAN win for the first time in Tlaxcala, in a state that would not normally be considered PAN territory, although its candidate was a member of the PRI until a few months before the elections. It also managed to hold on to Querétaro (by a mere 3% margin against the PRI) and Aguascalientes (although in 2007, it lost most of the municipalities and the local Congress to the PRI). However, in 2005 the PAN lost the elections for the state government of Mexico State and Nayarit to the PRI. The former was considered one of the most important elections in the country because of the number of voters involved, which is higher than the elections for head of government of the Federal District. (See: 2003 Mexican elections, 2004 Mexican elections and 2005 Mexican elections for results.)

Significantly in the 2006 presidential election in 2006, the PAN candidate Felipe Calderón was elected to succeed Vicente Fox. Calderón was the son of one of the founders of the PAN, and was himself a former party president. He was selected as the PAN's candidate, after beating his opponents Santiago Creel (Secretary of the Interior during Fox's term) and Alberto Cárdenas (former governor of Jalisco) in every voting round in the party primaries. On 2 July 2006, Felipe Calderón secured a plurality of the votes cast. Finishing less than one percent behind was Andrés Manuel López Obrador, who challenged the results of the election on possible grounds of electoral fraud. In addition to the presidency, the PAN won 206 seats in the Chamber of Deputies and 52 in the Senate, securing it the largest single party blocs in both houses.

In 2007, the PAN lost the governorship and the majority in the state congress of Yucatán to the PRI as well as the municipal presidency of Aguascalientes, but kept both the governorship and the majority in the state congress of Baja California. The PRI also obtained more municipal presidents and local congresspeople in Chihuahua, Durango, Zacatecas, Aguascalientes, Chiapas and Oaxaca. The PRD obtained more posts than the PAN in Zacatecas, Chiapas and Oaxaca.

In 2009, the PAN held 33 seats in the Senate and 142 seats in the Chamber of Deputies.

==== Return of the PRI to presidency ====
Logo used until October 2025

In 2012, the PAN lost the Presidential Election to Enrique Peña Nieto of the PRI. They also won 38 seats in the Senate (a gain of 3 seats), and 114 seats in the Chamber of Deputies (a loss of 28 seats). The government of president of Mexico Enrique Peña Nieto (EPN) has faced multiple scandals, and allegations of corruption. Reforma who has run surveys of presidential approval since 1995, revealed EPN had received a mere 12% approval rating, the lowest since they started to survey for presidential approval.

== Ideology ==
Supporters of the PAN party marching in Mexico City in October 2025

The PAN has been linked to a conservative stance in Mexican politics since its inception, but the party does not consider itself a fundamentally conservative party. The party ideology, at least in principle, is that of "National Action" which rejects a fundamental adherence to left- or right-wing politics or policies, instead requiring the adoption of such policies as correspond to the problems faced by the nation at any given moment. Thus both right- and left-wing policies may be considered equally carefully in formulation of national policy.

This theory of National Action politics, rejecting a fundamental adherence to right or left, is held within a strongly Christian context, and falls under the umbrella of Christian democracy.

The party theory was largely developed by early figures such as Gómez Morín and his associates. However, some observers consider the PAN claim to National Action politics to be weakened by the apparent persistent predominance of conservatism in PAN policy in practice. The PAN has similarities with Europe and Latin America's Christian democratic parties.

=== Economic policies ===
The PAN currently occupies the right of Mexico's political spectrum, advocating free enterprise, pragmatism, small government, privatization and libertarian reforms as well. The PAN is a member of the Christian Democrat Organization of America. In general, PAN claims to support free enterprise and thus free trade agreements.

=== Social policies ===
==== Abortion ====
Carlos Abascal, secretary of the interior in the latter part of the Fox administration, called emergency contraception a "weapon of mass destruction" in July 2005. It was during Fox's term, however, that the "morning-after" pill was legalized, even though the Church had condemned the use of these kind of pills, calling them "abortion pills".

The PAN produced a television spot against state-financed abortion, one that features popular comedian Chespirito (who was also featured on a TV spot promoting Vicente Fox in the 2000 presidential elections) and a second one that accuses the PRI and PRD of wanting to kill the unborn. After the abortion bill, which made abortion available, anonymous, and free or government-paid, was approved at the local legislature, the PAN requested the Human Rights Commission of the Federal District (CDHDF) to enact actions on the unconstitutionality of the measure, the CDHDF rejected the request as it found no basis of unconstitutionality. After unsuccessfully appealing to unconstitutionality, the PAN declared that it may request the remotion of Emilio Álvarez Icaza, the president of the Human Rights Commission of the Federal District, for his lack of moral quality. The PAN, with the members of the Association of Catholic Lawyers, gathered signatures and turned them in to the Federal District Electoral Institute (IEDF) to void the abortion bill and force a referendum, which was also rejected by the IEDF. In May 2007, the PAN started a campaign to encourage rejections to perform abortion among doctors in the Federal District based on conscience.

==== LGBT issues ====
The party has historically maintained a cautious and evolving stance on LGBT rights, marked by legislative resistance alongside growing public openness.

During Vicente Fox's presidency (2000–2006), his administration implemented several human rights initiatives, including establishing the National Council to Prevent Discrimination (CONAPRED), and did not oppose civil unions. However, PAN legislators voted against the civil union laws passed in Mexico City and Coahuila in 2006, the first two Mexican jurisdictions to enact such legislation. In February 2007, PAN deputies filed a challenge to the Coahuila law before the State Supreme Court, which was dismissed.

Between 2009 and 2010, the PAN opposed same-sex marriage legalization in Mexico City and filed a constitutional challenge before the Supreme Court of Mexico. President Felipe Calderón (2006–2012) stated that, under the Constitution at the time, marriage was defined as between a man and a woman, and emphasized that the matter should be resolved judicially; he denied that the party's opposition was motivated by prejudice. In 2010, the court ruled that banning same-sex marriage was discriminatory, setting a precedent that facilitated its gradual state-level recognition and culminating in nationwide legalization in 2022. The party’s stance varied by state: it opposed same-sex marriage in most legislatures but occasionally supported it unanimously, as in Nayarit (2015) and Campeche (2016).

In 2024, four PAN deputies were the only legislators to vote against the federal bill banning conversion therapies, which was approved and criminalized the practice nationwide. The party justified its opposing votes, arguing that the proposal was based on a "misinterpretation of its wording". During the 2024 presidential campaign, Fuerza y Corazón por México candidate Xóchitl Gálvez, whose coalition included PAN, publicly supported LGBTQ rights and met with advocacy groups. In October 2025, amid the party’s "renewal," PAN president Jorge Romero Herrera stated that the party sought to defend family values, including respect for same-sex marriage and parenting.

== Party presidents ==
- Manuel Gómez Morín 1939–1949
- Juan Gutiérrez Lascuráin 1949–1956
- Alfonso Ituarte Servín 1956–1959
- José González Torres 1959–1962
- Adolfo Christlieb Ibarrola 1962–1968
- Ignacio Limón Maurer 1968–1969
- Manuel González Hinojosa 1969–1972
- José Ángel Conchelo Dávila 1972–1975
- Efraín González Morfín 1975^{1}
- Raúl González Schmall 1975 (interim)
- Manuel González Hinojosa 1975–1978
- Abel Vicencio Tovar 1978–1984
- Pablo Emilio Madero 1984–1987
- Luis H. Álvarez 1987–1993
- Carlos Castillo Peraza 1993–1996
- Felipe Calderón 1996–1999
- Luis Felipe Bravo Mena 1999–2005
- Manuel Espino Barrientos 2005–2007
- Germán Martínez Cázares 2007–2009
- César Nava Vázquez 2009–2010
- Gustavo Madero Muñoz 2010–2014
- Cecilia Romero Castillo 2014
- Ricardo Anaya 2014–2015
- Gustavo Madero Muñoz 2015
- Ricardo Anaya 2015–2017^{1}
- Damián Zepeda Vidales 2017–2018
- Marcelo Torres Cofiño 2018
- Marko Cortés Mendoza 2018–2024
- Jorge Romero Herrera 2024–present

_{1.- Resigned to run for president}

== Election results ==
=== Presidential elections ===
Election	Candidate	# votes	% vote	Result	Note
1952	Efraín González Luna	285,555	7.8	✗ Defeated	
1958	Luis H. Álvarez	705,303	9.4	✗ Defeated	
1964	José González Torres	1,034,337	11.0	✗ Defeated	
1970	Efraín González Morfín	1,945,070	14.0	✗ Defeated	
1976	No Candidate			✗ Did not run	
1982	Pablo Emilio Madero	3,700,045	16.4	✗ Defeated	
1988	Manuel Clouthier	3,208,584	16.8	✗ Defeated	
1994	Diego Fernández de Cevallos	9,146,841	25.9	✗ Defeated	
2000	Vicente Fox	15,989,636	42.5	✓ Elected	Coalition: Alianza por el Cambio
2006	Felipe Calderón	15,000,284	35.8	✓ Elected	
2012	Josefina Vázquez Mota	12,786,647	25.4	✗ Defeated	
2018	Ricardo Anaya	12,609,472	22.3	✗ Defeated	Coalition: Por México al Frente
2024	Xóchitl Gálvez	16,502,697	28.11	✗ Defeated	Coalition: Fuerza y Corazón por México

=== Congressional elections ===
Note: Only elections where the party won seats are listed.

==== Chamber of Deputies ====
Election	Constituency		PR		# of seats	Position	Presidency	Note
Election	votes	%	votes	%	# of seats	Position	Presidency	Note
1946	51,312	2.2			4 / 147	Minority	Miguel Alemán Valdés	
1952	301,986	8.3			5 / 161	Minority	Adolfo Ruiz Cortines	
1958	749,519	10.2			6 / 162	Minority	Adolfo López Mateos	
1964	1,042,396	11.5			20 / 210	Minority	Gustavo Díaz Ordaz	
1970	1,893,289	14.2			20 / 213	Minority	Luis Echeverría Álvarez	
1976	1,358,403	9.0			20 / 237	Minority	José López Portillo	
1982	3,663,846	17.5			51 / 400	Minority	Miguel de la Madrid	
1988	3,276,824	18.0			101 / 500	Minority	Carlos Salinas de Gortari	
1994	8,664,834	25.8	8,833,468	25.8	119 / 500	Minority	Ernesto Zedillo	
1997	7,696,197	25.9	7,792,290	25.9	121 / 500	Minority	Ernesto Zedillo	
2000	14,212,032	38.2	14,321,975	38.3	223 / 500	Minority	Vicente Fox	Coalition: Alliance for Change
2003	8,189,699	30.7	8,219,649	30.7	151 / 500	Minority	Vicente Fox	
2006	13,753,633	33.4	13,845,121	33.4	206 / 500	Minority	Felipe Calderón	
2009	9,679,435	28.0	9,714,181	28.0	143 / 500	Minority	Felipe Calderón	
2012	12,895,902	25.9	12,971,363	25.9	114 / 500	Minority	Enrique Peña Nieto	
2015	8,346,846	22.06	8,379,270	22.06	108 / 500	Minority	Enrique Peña Nieto	
2018	697,595	1.25	10,096,588	17.93	83 / 500	Minority	Andrés Manuel López Obrador	Coalition: For Mexico to the Front
2021	3,828,228	7.83	8,969,288	18.25	111 / 500	Minority	Andrés Manuel López Obrador	Coalition: Va por México
2024	372,670	0.66	10,049,375	17.55	72 / 500	Minority	Claudia Sheinbaum	Coalition: Fuerza y Corazón por México

==== Senate elections ====
Election	Constituency		PR		# of seats	Position	Presidency	Note
Election	votes	%	votes	%	# of seats	Position	Presidency	Note
1994			8,805,038	25.7	25 / 128	Minority	Ernesto Zedillo	
1997			7,880,966	26.1	33 / 128	Minority	Ernesto Zedillo	
2000	14,208,973	38.1	14,339,963	38.2	60 / 128	Minority	Vicente Fox	Coalition: Alliance for Change
2006	13,889,159	33.5	14,035,503	33.6	52 / 128	Minority	Felipe Calderón	
2012	13,126,478	26.3	13,245,088	26.3	38 / 128	Minority	Enrique Peña Nieto	
2018	600,423	1.07	9,971,804	17.59	23 / 128	Minority	Andrés Manuel López Obrador	Coalition: For Mexico to the Front
2024	1,148,920	2.01	10,107,537	17.54	22 / 128	Minority	Claudia Sheinbaum	Coalition: Fuerza y Corazón por México

== Bibliography ==
- Chand, Vikram K. Mexico's Political Awakening, Notre Dame: University of Notre Dame Press 2001.
- Espinosa, David. Jesuit Student Groups, the Universidad Iberoamericana, and Political Resistance in Mexico. Albuquerque: University of New Mexico Press 2014.
- Loaeza, Soledad. El Partido de Acción Nacional: La larga marcha, 1939–1994: Oposición leal y partido de protesta. Mexico: Fondo de Cultura Económico 1999.
- Loaeza, Soledad. "Partido de Acción Nacional." In Encyclopedia of Mexico, vol. 2, pp. 1048–1052. Chicago: Fitzroy Dearborn 1997.
- Mabry, Donald J. Mexico's Acción Nacional: A Catholic Alternative to Revolution. Syracuse: Syracuse University Press 1973.
- Nuncio, Abraham. El PAN: Alternativa de poder o instrumento de la oligarquía empresarial. Mexico: Editorial Nuevo Imagen 1986.
- Shirk, David A. "Mexico's New Politics: The PAN and Democratic Change" Boulder: Lynne Rienner Publishers 2005.
- Von Sauer, Franz A. The Alienated "Loyal" Opposition: Mexico's Partido de Acción Nacional. Albuquerque: University of New Mexico Press 1974.
- Ward, Peter. "Policy Making and Policy Implementation among Non-PRI Government: The PAN in Ciudad Juárez and in Chihuahua." In Victoria E. Rodríguez and Peter M. Ward, Opposition Government in Mexico pp. 135–52. Albuquerque: University of New Mexico Press 1995.

== See also ==
- National Action Party Jalisco
- History of democracy in Mexico
- List of political parties in Mexico
