= Rodolfo Sánchez Taboada =

Mexican politician and military officer (1895-1955)

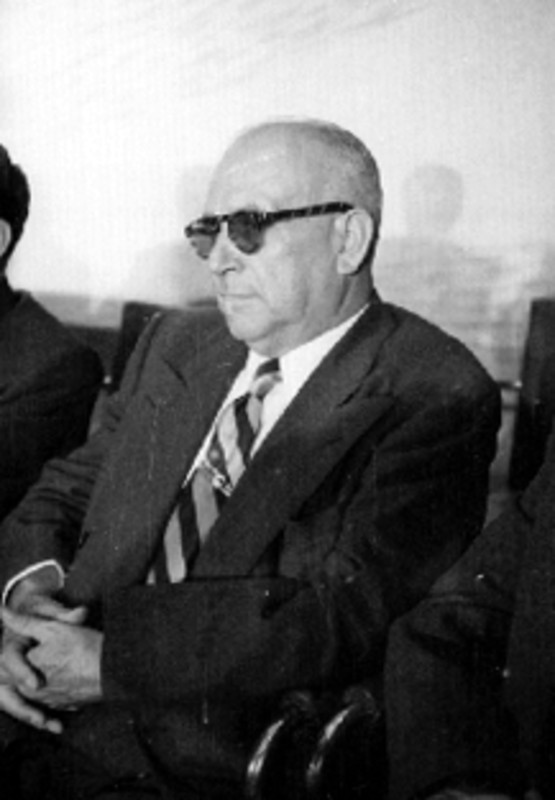
- Sánchez Taboada, c. 1955

Secretary of the Navy
- In office 1 December 1952 – 2 May 1955
- President: Adolfo Ruiz Cortines
- Preceded by: Raúl López Sánchez
- Succeeded by: Alfonso Poire Ruelas

President of the Institutional Revolutionary Party
- In office 4 December 1946 – 4 December 1952
- Preceded by: Rafael Pascasio Gamboa Cano
- Succeeded by: Gabriel Leyva Velázquez

Governor of Baja California
- In office 1 March 1937 – 31 July 1944; Acting: 22 February – 1 March 1937
- Preceded by: Rafael Navarro Cortina
- Succeeded by: Juan Felipe Rico Islas

Personal details
- Born: March 22, 1895 Acatzingo de Hidalgo, Acatzingo, Puebla, Mexico
- Died: May 2, 1955 (aged 60) Mexico City, Mexico
- Party: Institutional Revolutionary Party
- Spouse: Emma Cruz
- Children: 3
- Relatives: Germán Sierra Sánchez (grandson)

Military service
- Branch/service: Constitutional Army, Mexican Armed Forces
- Rank: Brigadier general
- Battles/wars: Mexican Revolution; Delahuertista Rebellion; Escobar Rebellion

Rodolfo Sánchez Taboada (22 March 1895 – 2 May 1955) was a Mexican military officer and politician who served as secretary of the navy from 1952 until his death in 1955, during the presidency of Adolfo Ruiz Cortines. He previously served as the governor of the territory of Baja California from 1937 to 1944 and as president of the Institutional Revolutionary Party (PRI) from 1946 to 1952.

Born in the state of Puebla, Sánchez Taboada attended the University of Puebla before dropping out to join the Constitutional Army during the Mexican Revolution. He took part in the assassination of Emiliano Zapata in 1919, and subsequently rose through the ranks, supporting the government during several rebellions. He was appointed as governor of Baja California, then a federal territory, in 1937 by President Lázaro Cárdenas. As governor, Sánchez Taboada promoted the Good Neighbor policy with the United States. He resigned in 1944 and returned to service in the army.

In 1946, Sánchez Taboada became the president of the ruling PRI, and was reelected the position in 1950, the first to do so. He implemented an anti-communist platform for the party and directed the successful presidential campaign of Ruiz Cortines in 1952. He also mentored and gave appointments to a generation of future PRI politicians, the most prominent of which was Luis Echeverría, a future president of Mexico. In 1952, he left his position to become secretary of the navy under Ruiz Cortines. He oversaw the implementation of the March to the Sea program, which sought to modernize and expand the usage of the country's maritime resources. He died in office in 1955. Several locations have been named after him, including Mexicali International Airport and a borough in Tijuana.

== Family and education ==
Rodolfo Sánchez Taboada was born on 22 March 1895 in Acatzingo de Hidalgo in the municipality of Acatzingo, Puebla. (Note: Most sources cite his year of birth as 1895 without giving a specific date, although Arturo Sánchez Gutiérrez mistakenly says that he was born in 1885. According to Baja California's state archives, he was born on 22 March 1895. Patricia Galeana gives his date of birth as 7 May 1895.) His parents, Tirso "Charro" Sánchez Limón and Margarita Taboada, were middle-class farmers. His brother Ruperto Sánchez Taboada was a federal deputy for Puebla from 1946 to 1949, and his brother Tirso Sánchez Taboada was a Supreme Court justice from 1941 to 1942.

Sánchez Taboada received his elementary education in San Sebastián Villanueva. He completed his secondary education at the Colegio de San José and Hospicio de Puebla. He then attended the University of Puebla. He completed two years of a pre-medical program at the university, but ended his studies in 1914 to fight in the Mexican Revolution.

He was married to Emma Cruz. Their children were Rodolfo, Margarita, and Matilde "Maty" Sánchez Cruz. Sánchez Taboada had three grandchildren through his son Rodolfo Sánchez Cruz; Laura Alicia, Manuel, and Rodolfo Sánchez Corro. Though his daughter Matilde Sánchez Cruz, Sánchez Taboada had another grandson, Germán Sierra Sánchez. Sánchez Taboada's son Rodolfo Sánchez Cruz was also a PRI politician representing Puebla, as was his grandson Sierra Sánchez.

== Military career ==
=== Mexican Revolution ===
In February 1913, during the Mexican Revolution, President Francisco I. Madero was overthrown by Victoriano Huerta. This inspired Sánchez Taboada to join the Constitutionalist forces, serving under Fortunato Maycotte. He enrolled in the Heroic Military Academy on 10 November 1914 as a sub-lieutenant to join the medical corps. He fought Zapatistas in the state of Morelos under the command of Col. Jesús Guajardo.

On 10 April 1919, Guajardo's troops assassinated the revolutionary general Emiliano Zapata in Chinameca, Morelos. Sánchez Taboada participated in the operation. Sánchez Taboada is said by some to have been the one who gave Zapata the coup de grâce, according to the magazine Zeta. Sánchez Taboada later stated of the event:

I did in fact form part of the forces which liquidated Zapata, and I was one of the first to see his cadaver. I want to express to you that at the time he had taken up arms against the government of the Republic and it was the Republic's soldiers who killed him.

If the dearest and most respected of my friends were to take up arms against the Republic and its institutions and I as a soldier were entrusted with the task of pursuing and exterminating him, I would do it, following my duty. Yes, I saw Zapata fall. By the way, he had very big and beautiful eyes.

He reportedly said this in conversation with Gonzalo N. Santos and Leobardo Reynoso, who stated that he was not at the Chinameca hacienda where Zapata was killed. Sánchez Taboada and Guajardo were reportedly promoted for taking part in the operation. Sánchez Taboada supported General Álvaro Obregón's Plan of Agua Prieta against President Venustiano Carranza in 1920.

=== Post-revolution and political beginnings ===
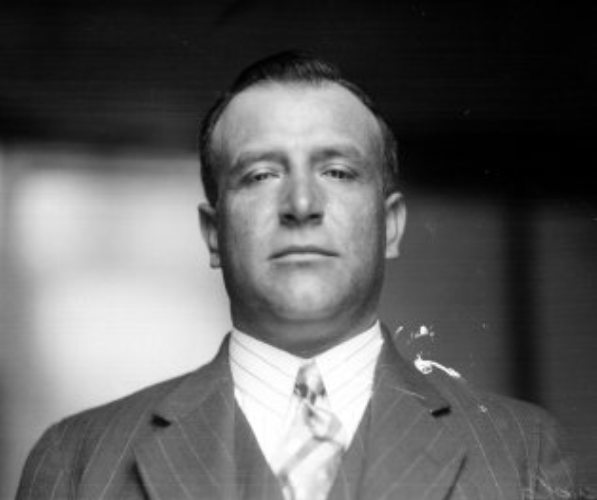
Sánchez Taboada, c. 1925

He remained loyal to Obregón's government during the Delahuertista Rebellion of 1923 to 1924 and to Emilio Portes Gil's government during the Escobar Rebellion of 1929. Also in 1929, Plutarco Elías Calles founded the Institutional Revolutionary Party (Spanish: Partido Revolucionario Institucional), or PRI. (Note: Origninally named the National Revolutionary Party (Spanish: Partido Nacional Revolucionario), its name was changed to the Party of the Mexican Revolution (Spanish: Partido de la Revolución Mexicana) in 1938, and it adopted its current name in 1946.) The party would rule Mexico uninterrupted from 1929 until 2000. Its one-party rule was characterized as a restricted democracy, with elections being regularly held and some opposition parties allowed in a way that propped up a mostly antidemocratic regime. Sánchez Taboada was a founding member of the party.

Sánchez Taboada was a friend of General Lázaro Cárdenas. It is unknown if they were in contact prior to 1932, which is their earliest confirmed meeting, and Sánchez Taboada is not known to have previously been involved in politics. Sánchez Taboada accompanied Cárdenas on his presidential campaign in 1933 and 1934. Cárdenas won the election.

Sánchez Taboada served as an assistant to President Cárdenas in 1935. That same year, he also served as the budget director for the office of the presidency. Sánchez Taboada achieved the rank of colonel on 4 October 1939. After the end of his governorship in 1944, Sánchez Taboada returned to service in the army. He was at the direct disposal of President Manuel Ávila Camacho from 1 August 1944 until 15 October 1945. In 1950, a group of Zapatista veterans wrote in La Prensa that Sánchez Taboada should be removed from the army for his role in assassinating Zapata. He was promoted to the rank of brigadier general on 1 November 1952.

== Governor of Baja California ==
=== Administration ===
Sánchez Taboada was governor of Baja California (in red), which was a federal territory until 1952

On 22 February 1937, President Cárdenas discharged the governor of Baja California, Rafael Navarro Cortina, due to complaints of gambling resurfacing along the Mexico–United States border, and appointed Sánchez Taboada to serve as governor. Sánchez Taboada assumed the office on 1 March 1937. While Sánchez Taboada was serving as governor of Baja California, Manuel J. Contreras served as the military commander of the Northern District of Baja California, which left Sánchez Taboada in charge of civilian authorities and Contreras in charge of military authorities.

Like many northern governors, Sánchez Taboada supported Manuel Ávila Camacho for the PRI candidacy during the 1940 presidential election. Ávila Camacho ultimately won the election. It was reported by the Los Angeles Times in August 1941 that Ávila Camacho was going to replace Sánchez Taboada with Edmundo Sánchez Cano. However, this did not happen. Sánchez Taboada's term ended on 31 July 1944. He resigned, being given permission by Baja California's legislature to leave office, reportedly due to dissatisfaction with the perceived incompetence of his appointments. He was succeeded by Juan Felipe Rico Islas, who had been chosen for the role the previous year.

=== Domestic affairs ===
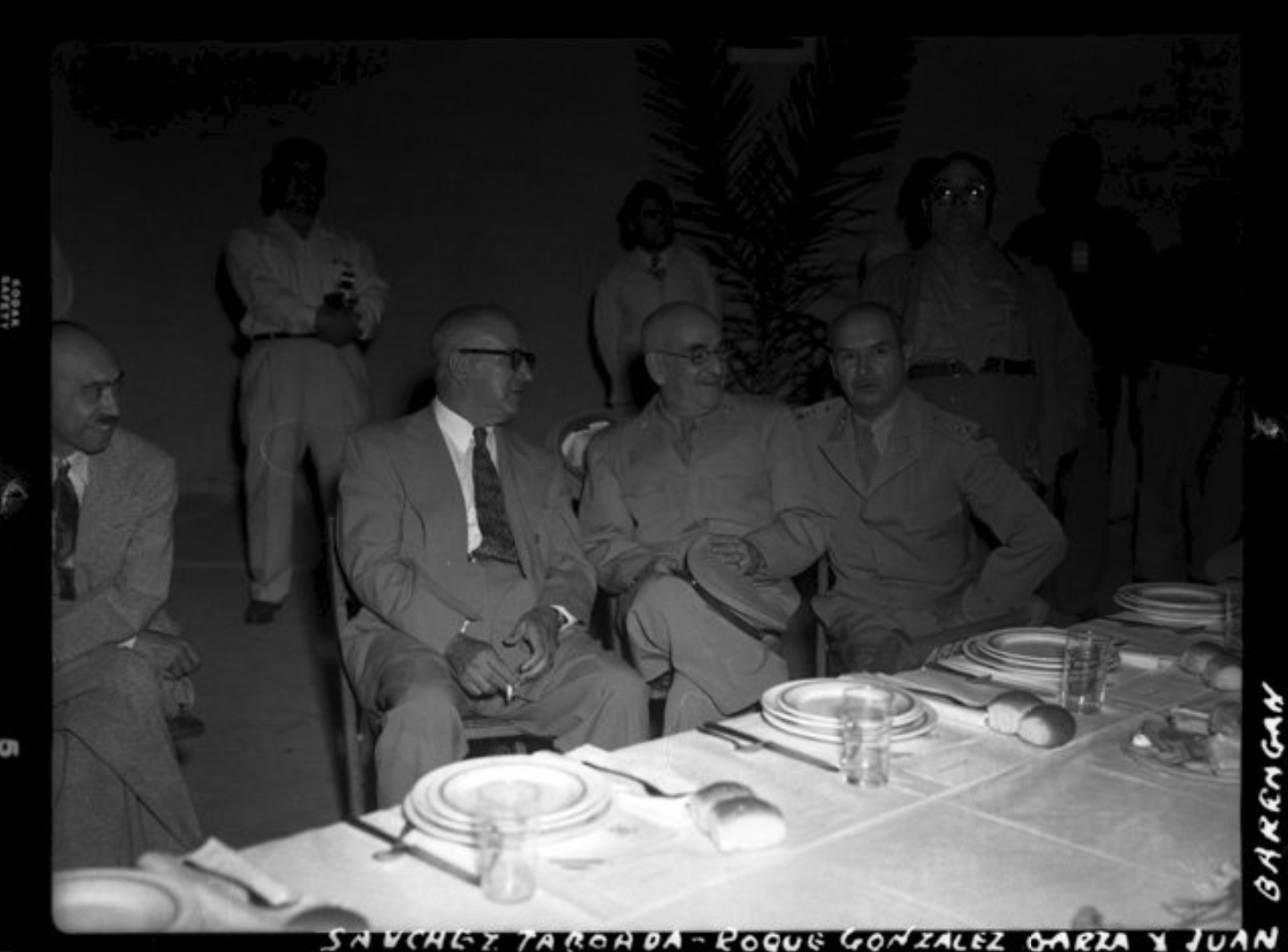
Sánchez Taboada (left) with Roque González Garza (center) and Juan Barragán at a banquet in 1938

At the time of his governorship, Baja California was a federal territory. During his administration, the second Pro-State Committee (Spanish: Comité Pro-Estado) was formed in 1940, following the first in 1929. The territory would ultimately become a state in 1952.

Sánchez Taboada supported Cárdenas's vision for land reform. By April 1937, more than 100,000 acres of American-owned land in Baja California had been taken under government control for redistribution. This led to 11,000 ranchers protesting throughout April and May, demanding immediate cash payment for the work that they had done on the land they no longer controlled. Sánchez Taboada averted a general strike by agreeing to the ranchers' general demands.

Parts of Mexicali, the state's capital, were damaged in the 1940 El Centro earthquake, including by fire and flooding. Sánchez Taboada placed affected areas under governmental care and promised immediate aid in rebuilding.

During World War II, a national directive was issued that ordered governors to remove their Japanese populations to designated zones of Mexico City and Guadalajara. Sánchez Taboada quickly rounded up his state's Japanese population and forced them on trains and trucks bound for the zones. He gave them only twenty-four hours to evacuate, but ex-president Cárdenas, who was in charge of military operations in the Pacific zone, expanded the timeframe to one week.

=== Mexico–United States relations ===
In March 1937, Sánchez Taboada traveled to the city of Calexico, California, and met with the city's officials in an effort to promote the Good Neighbor policy in place between Mexico and the United States at the time. In May 1938, Sánchez Taboada met the governor of California, Frank Merriam, in San Ysidro, San Diego. In February 1941, Sánchez Taboada and California governor Culbert Olson met at the border of the two countries, then Sánchez Taboada once again visited Calexico, followed by Olsen's visit to Mexicali. In December 1942, the governor-elect of California, Earl Warren, visited Sánchez Taboada in Mexicali, and Sánchez Taboada again traveled to Calexico. In April 1943, for Pan American Day, Sánchez Taboada attended a good neighbor luncheon in El Centro, pledging close ties between the two countries, which was received warmly by now-governor Warren.

== President of the PRI ==
=== First term ===
Sánchez Taboada served as president of the Regional Committee of the PRI for the Federal District in 1946 during the presidential campaign of Miguel Alemán Valdés. Alemán won the election by a large margin. Afterwards, Sánchez Taboada expected to be included in the new administration, with a post such as the secretary of agriculture or the head of the Department of the Federal District. However, Alemán did not give him such a position. Instead, Sánchez Taboada became the president of the PRI's National Executive Committee (Spanish: Comité Ejecutivo Nacional, CEN) (Note: Named the Central Executive Committee (Spanish: Comité Central Nacional, CCE) until 1950) on 4 December 1946, succeeding Rafael Pascasio Gamboa Cano. The latter was appointed by the then-candidate Alemán in an attempt to "civilianize" the party. However, Gamboa was largely unknown and unpopular, and within less than a year Alemán replaced him with Sánchez Taboada.

During Alemán's presidency, the PRI branded itself as more decentralized, but the party remained heavily centralized. The PRI's National Assembly only met twice under Alemán and Sánchez Taboada, grassroots PRI organizations were virtually nonexistent, and only the state committees and the CEN held real power within the party structure. Sánchez Taboada and the CEN led a vast party membership drive in 1947, but this did not turn the PRI into a "party of citizens". Sánchez Taboada became the first of four PRI presidents in a row from 1946 to 1964 who were all generals and some of Mexico's most prominent military figures. (Note: Those four were Sánchez Taboada, Gabriel Leyva Velázquez, Agustín Olachea, and Alfonso Corona del Rosal.)

We declare with firmness and clarity that we are not Communists and we will not be Communists; that we love above all else liberty and we do not accept any imperialism; that we affirm our belief in and our commitment to democracy, and that we are ready to fight at the side of the people, including against those who, with pretentious displays of verbal gymnastics, tend to expound ideas that do not accord with Mexican realities.

— Sánchez Taboada, 1947

Following the declaration of the Truman Doctrine in the United States in 1947, the PRI followed its lead in adopting increasingly anti-communist stances. The party declared itself to be "neither extreme left nor extreme right" (Spanish: ni extrema izquierda ni extrema derecha). Sánchez Taboada declared that from that point on the PRI would not accept people from other parties, which was intended to allow for the expulsion of communists from the party. That same year, U.S. President Harry S. Truman visited Mexico City. During the visit, Sánchez Taboada denounced communism as a "pernicious influence" and derided the left-wing politician Vicente Lombardo Toledano as an agent of Moscow. Sánchez Taboada also led a push to drive communists out of the Secretariat of Public Education.

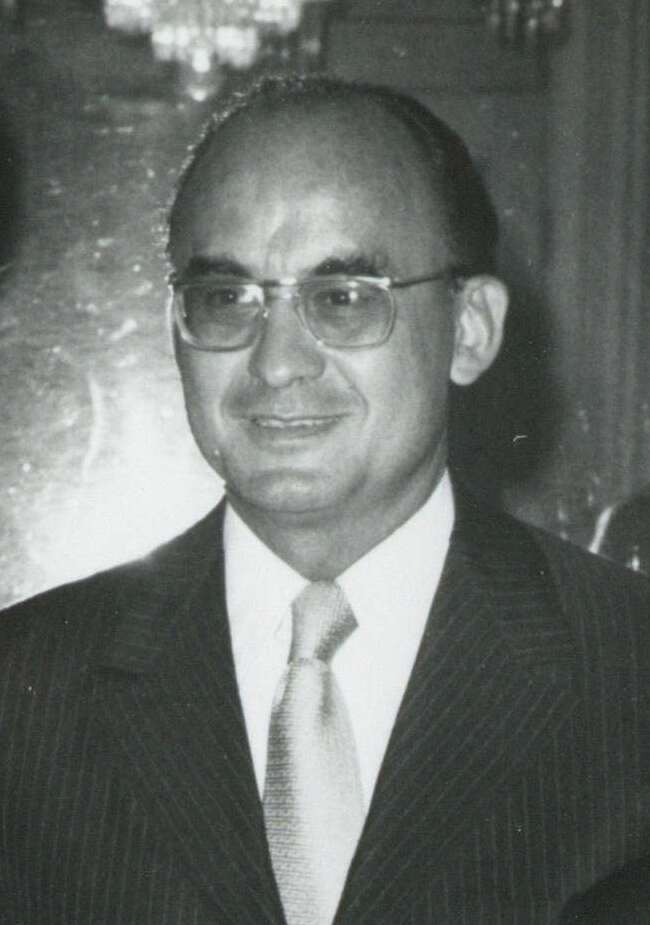
Sánchez Taboada was a mentor to Luis Echeverría Álvarez (pictured), who later became president of Mexico.

Sánchez Taboada was a mentor to one of the most influential political groups in Mexican politics, a generation which attained power in the 1970s. In 1946, while he was serving as president of the PRI, he hired Luis Echeverría Álvarez to serve as his personal secretary. Echeverría would later serve as president of Mexico from 1970 to 1976. Echeverría's father, Rodolfo Echeverría, had served as paymaster to an army unit that Sánchez Taboada commanded. Sánchez Taboada also made him director general of press and propaganda of the PRI in 1949.

Also in 1946, Sánchez Taboada appointed Teófilo Borunda, who would later serve as the governor of Chihuahua, as General Secretary of the PRI. Under Sánchez Taboada's guidance, Echeverría, future Michoacán governor Agustín Arriaga Rivera, and future Baja California Sur governor Hugo Cervantes del Río served as youth members of the PRI's National Committee. Other protégées of Sánchez Taboada's include future Baja California governor Milton Castellanos Everardo, future Guanajuato governor Rafael Corrales Ayala, future Durango governor Armando del Castillo Franco, future Nuevo León deputy Margarita García Flores, future Jalisco governor Flavio Romero de Velasco, future Tabasco governor Leandro Rovirosa Wade, future Sinaloa governor Leopoldo Sánchez Celis, and future Hidalgo governor José Luis Suárez Molina.

=== Second term ===
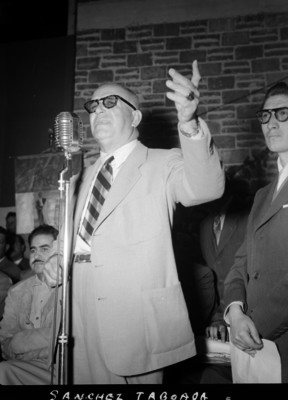
Sánchez Taboada giving a speech, c. 1946-1952

From 2 February to 4 February 1950, the PRI held its National Assembly, and Sánchez Taboada became the first president of the PRI to be reelected to the position. His reelection had been opposed by some older PRI members, so to satisfy them, the party removed the provisions from the party's statutes that called for primaries, and all candidates from that point on would be elected by assemblies. Elements at the assembly also supported futurism, which was opposed by the higher authorities of the PRI. Sánchez Taboada attempted to control this sentiment by stating in April that he did not oppose futurism if it was a constructive attitude that emphasized the wellbeing of Mexicans.

Sánchez Taboada also sought to make the party amiable with the Catholic Church. In a 1951 tour of Mexico's southeast, he arranged several church visits and assured the press of the PRI's respect for "the religious beliefs of the pueblo". His outreach efforts to Catholics were done to weaken conservative support for Efraín González Luna and the National Action Party (PAN).

In 1951, Sánchez Taboada called for a national convention to select the PRI's presidential candidate for the 1952 election, to be held from 11 October to 14 October. On 13 October, he proposed the secretary of the interior, Adolfo Ruiz Cortines, as the candidate. He subsequently became the candidate the following day. Sánchez Taboada served as the director of his presidential campaign. Ruiz Cortines used the slogan "austerity and work" (Spanish: austeridad y trabajo) and endorsed women's suffrage. He faced three opponents: Miguel Henríquez Guzmán of the FPP, González Luna of the PAN, and Lombardo Toledano of the PP. The election was held on 6 July 1952. Ruiz Cortines won in a landslide with 2,713,419 votes, which represented 74.3% of the total vote. Sánchez Taboada's presidency of the PRI ended on 4 December 1952. He was succeeded by Gabriel Leyva Velázquez.

== Navy secretary and death ==
Upon assuming the presidency, Ruiz Cortines nominated Sánchez Taboada to serve as secretary of the navy. Succeeding Raúl López Sánchez, he assumed office on 1 December 1952. Sánchez Taboada named Echeverría as General Director of Accounts and Administration of the Secretary of the Navy, and Cervantes del Río as his personal secretary.

During his term, Sánchez Taboada carried out the project Programa de Progreso Marítimo ("Maritime Progress Program"), popularly known as the Marcha al Mar ("March to the Sea"). The project was planned by the Ruiz Cortines administration to bring surplus populations from Mexico's highlands into costal areas and to make better use of maritime resources. It also called for the improvement of ports, and the modernization of rail and highway communications between ports and inland cities. The six-year project was given a budget of 750,000,000 pesos, with 150,000,000 pesos being spent in its first year under Sánchez Taboada.

Sánchez Taboada also commissioned the ship Orizaba as a training ship at the Heroica Escuela Naval Militar under the name Zaragoza II. He also deployed more ships to stop Cuban and American shrimp poachers in the Gulf of Mexico. In October 1954, Sánchez Taboada and several other high-ranking naval officials visited Washington, D.C. to tour American naval institutions and promote the Marcha al Mar.

Sánchez Taboada died in office of a myocardial infarction on 2 May 1955 in Mexico City. (Note: Fernández Pavón cites his death date as 1 May at 9 PM. A contemporary report in the New York Times states that he died in the morning on 2 May, a date which Roderic Ai Camp and Alejandro Domínguez also give. Galeana states that he died on 3 May.) He was buried in the Panteón Francés de Puebla in the city of Puebla on 3 May. On 9 May, Ruiz Cortines nominated Alfonso Poire Ruelas to succeed Sánchez Taboada.

== Legacy ==
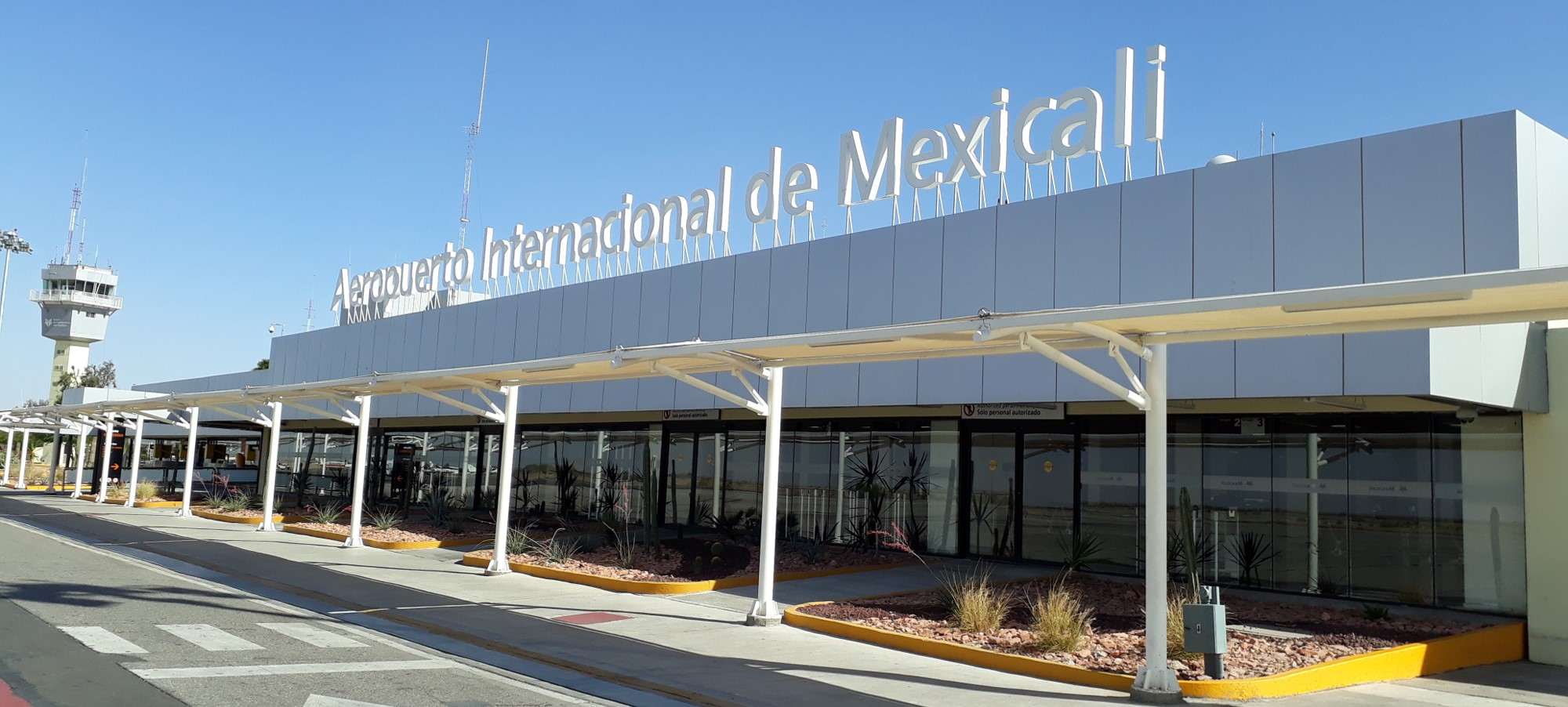
Mexicali International Airport (pictured) is named after Sánchez

Following Sánchez Taboada's death, Echeverría was made a senior officer of the Secretariat of Public Education. He progressed through several further positions in the following years, becoming secretary of the interior in 1964 and ultimately becoming president of Mexico in 1970. Echeverría named one of his sons, Rodolfo, after Sánchez Taboada. He attributed his political career to Sánchez Taboada, stating:

When I was received I wanted to enter into political activities and I went to ask General Sánchez Toboada for work and he gave it to me and that decided everything... he decided my life.

Spanish: Cuando me recibí quise entrar en actividades políticas y fui a pedirle al general Sánchez Toboada trabajo y me lo dio y eso decidió todo... decidió mi vida.

Mexicali International Airport is named after Sánchez Taboada. A borough in the area of the Tijuana River also bears his name. The roundabout Glorieta Rodolfo Sánchez Taboada, located in the port of Mazatlán, Sinaloa, is also named after him. Boulevard General Rodolfo Sánchez Taboada is a street in Tijuana, Baja California. A bust of Sánchez Taboada existed on a street named after him in Guaymas, Sonora, but it was stolen in 2012. In 2020, a replacement bust was unveiled.
