= Efraín =

Efraín is a masculine Spanish given name, a cognate of Ephraim. Notable people with the name include:

- Efrain Chacurian (1924–2019), Argentine-born naturalised American soccer player
- Efraín Cortés (born 1984), Colombian football defender
- Efraín Escudero (born 1986), Mexican mixed martial arts fighter
- Efraín Flores (born 1958), Mexican football manager
- Efraín Forero Triviño (1932–2022), Colombian cyclist
- Efraín Goldenberg (1929–2025), Peruvian politician
- Efrain Gonzalez Jr. (born 1948), Puerto-Rico born New York senator
- Efraín González Luna (1898–1964), Mexican politician and presidential candidate
- Efraín González Morfín (1929–2012), Mexican politician and presidential candidate, son of the above
- Efrain Guigui (1925–2007), US-based Panamanian clarinetist and conductor.
- Efraín Guzmán (circa 1937–2002), Colombian guerrilla leader
- Efraín Huerta (1914–1982), Mexican poet
- Efraïn Jonckheer (1917–1987), Netherlands Antilles prime minister
- Efraín Juárez (born 1988), Mexican football player
- Efraín López Neris (born 1937), Puerto Rican actor
- Efraín Medina (born 1979), Mexican singer
- Efraín Morote (1921–1989), Peruvian anthropologist
- Efraín Ríos Montt (1926–2018), former de facto President of Guatemala
- Efraín Rivera Pérez (1951–2013), Associate Justice of the Supreme Court of Puerto Rico
- Efraín Sánchez (1926–2020), Colombian footballer
- Efraín Valdez (born 1966), Dominican Republic baseball player
- Efraín Velarde (born 1986), Mexican football player
