= Efraín González =

Efraín González may refer to:

- Efraín González Luna (1898–1964), Mexican politician and lawyer, presidential candidate in 1952
- Efraín González Morfín (1929–2012), Mexican lawyer and politician, presidential candidate in 1970
- Efraín González Téllez (1933–1965) Colombian bandolero, participated in La Violencia
- Efrain Gonzalez Jr. (born 1948), U.S. politician and convicted felon
