= Miguel Enríquez =

Miguel Enríquez may refer to:

- Miguel Enríquez (privateer), Puerto Rican merchant and privateer
- Miguel Enríquez (politician), Chilean politician
- Mike Enriquez, Filipino broadcast journalist

== See also ==
- Miguel Henríquez Guzmán
