= Celi =

Celi is an Italian surname. Notable people with the surname include:

- Adolfo Celi (1922–1986), Italian film actor and director
- Alessandra Celi (born 1966), Italian actress
- Ara Celi (born 1974), American actress
- Elizabeth Celi, Australian psychologist
- Guillermo Celi (born 1976), Ecuadorian politician
- Yuriel Celi (born 2002), Peruvian footballer

== See also ==
- Celi Bee, American disco musician
- CELI, Certificato di Conoscenza della Lingua Italiana
- Celis (disambiguation)
- Celli, surname
