= Sánchez Taboada (borough) =

- Borough (Delegación) of Tijuana
- Delegación Sánchez Taboada
- Location in Tijuana
- Coordinates: 32.465429°N 116.977884°W
- Country: Mexico
- State: Baja California
- Municipality (municipio): Tijuana
- Area code: 664

Sánchez Taboada is a borough of the municipality of Tijuana in Baja California, Mexico, and is located south of the city center and southwest of La Mesa. The borough was named after Mexican military general and politician Rodolfo Sánchez Taboada, who acted as the governor of the territory of Baja California from 1937-1944.

It was created in 2004 due to the increase of population density in the area. Since 2008, the district's crime numbers have been the highest in the city.

Sánchez Taboada borough is located south of the city center and southwest of La Mesa.
