= Statue of Efraín González Luna =

Statue in Guadalajara, Jalisco, Mexico

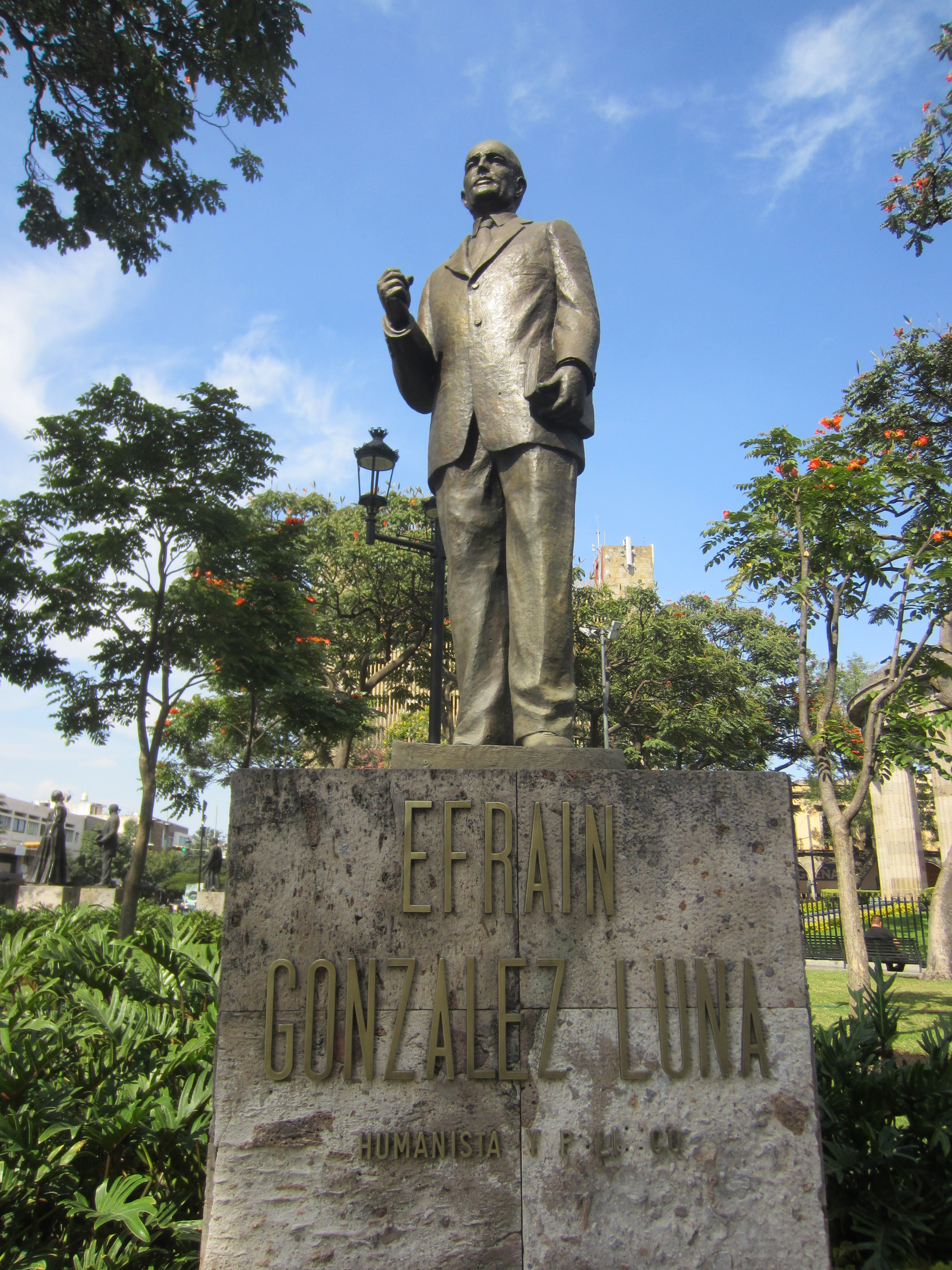
- The statue in 2021
- Subject: Efraín González Luna
- Location: Guadalajara, Jalisco, Mexico; 20°40′39″N 103°20′50.1″W

A statue of Efraín González Luna is installed along the Rotonda de los Jaliscienses Ilustres, in Centro, Guadalajara, in the Mexican state of Jalisco.
