= Vermont Symphony Orchestra =

American non-profit symphony orchestra

- Short name: VSO
- Founded: 1934
- Music director: Andrew Crust
- Website: www.vso.org

The Vermont Symphony Orchestra (VSO) is a symphony orchestra based in, and supported in part by, the U.S. state of Vermont. It is a 501(c)(3) corporation. It is one of the few, and the oldest, state-supported symphony orchestras in the United States.

== Organization ==
As of 2026 the VSO has 54 contracted musicians, represented by the Boston Musicians Association AFM Local 9-535. It presents an average of 35 to 40 concerts a year, and its annual budget is approximately $2.2 million. While operating statewide, the VSO's home offices are found in Burlington, Vermont.

== History ==
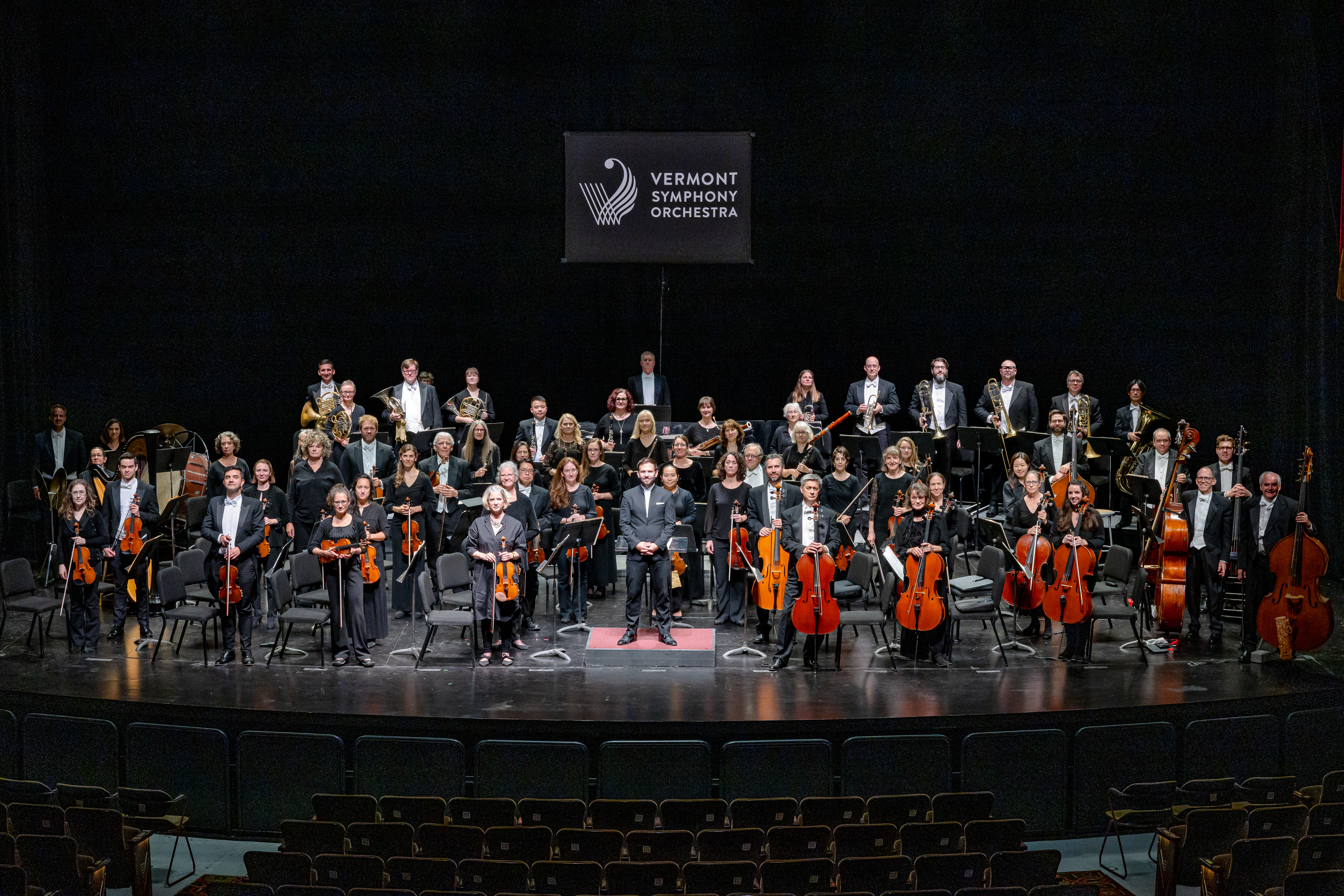
Music Director Andrew Crust and the VSO ensemble during his debut performance at the Flynn.

Founded in Woodstock, Vermont in 1934 by conductor Alan Carter, the VSO was established with the goal of creating a statewide musical ensemble. Unlike many urban orchestras, the VSO was designed as a touring entity, performing in diverse venues such as gymnasiums, armories, and outdoor hillsides to reach rural audiences. The early roster of musicians consisted of local residents from various professions, including farmers, doctors, and mail carriers.

In 1939, the Vermont State Legislature provided $1,000 in funding to send the orchestra to the New York World’s Fair, beginning a tradition of state support that continues today.

It performed in each of the state's 251 cities and towns between 1984 and 1986

Efrain Guigui led the orchestra from 1974 to 1989. Kate Tamarkin was music director from 1991 to 1999. Jaime Laredo was appointed music director in 2000. The current music director, Andrew Crust, was appointed in 2023.

== Mission ==
A part of the founding mission of the VSO is to make symphonic music accessible, at an affordable cost, to Vermont's mostly rural citizens. The Vermont Symphony Orchestra does not have a single home hall.

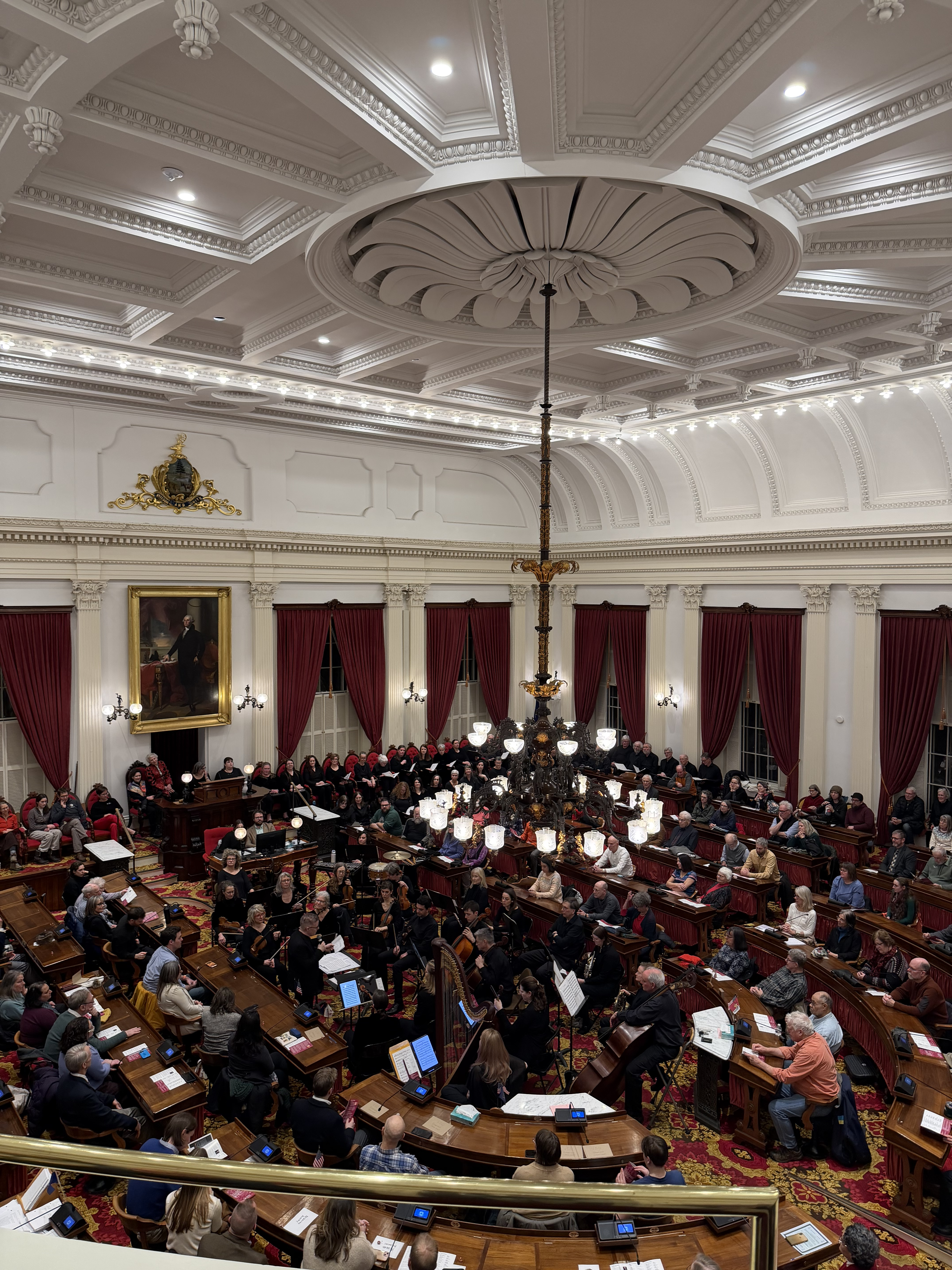
The Vermont Symphony Orchestra performs during the Farmers’ Night concert series in the chamber of the Vermont Legislature at the Vermont State House, February 11, 2026.

Chartered to bring music to the citizenry, the VSO performs in a broad range of settings including Robert Todd Lincoln's estate Hildene, the public lawn of the Vermont State House at Montpelier, the Flynn Center in Burlington, Shelburne Farms on the shore of Lake Champlain in Shelburne, Vermont, Trapp Concert Meadow and many town commons, opera houses and university art centers including Johnson State College, Middlebury College, Castleton State College, Lyndon State College, and the University of Vermont.

The VSO has extensive educational outreach with its Musicians-in-the-Schools and SymphonyKids youth orchestral concert programs.
