= Leopoldo Sánchez Celis =

Mexican politician

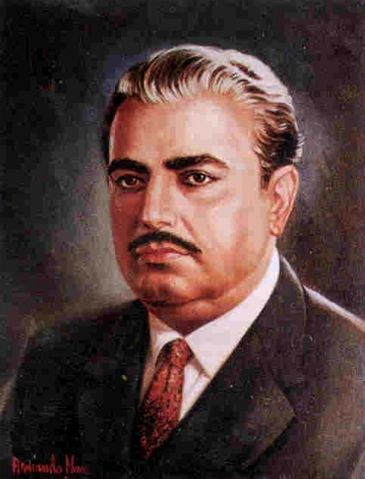

Governor of Sinaloa
- In office 1 January 1963 – 31 December 1968
- Preceded by: Gabriel Leyva Velázquez
- Succeeded by: Alfredo Valdés Montoya

Personal details
- Born: 14 February 1916 Cosalá, Sinaloa
- Died: 7 August 1989 (aged 73) Cuernavaca, Morelos
- Party: Institutional Revolutionary Party
- Profession: Politician

Leopoldo Sánchez Celis (Note: In this Mexican name, the surname is Sánchez and the second or maternal family name is Celis.) (14 February 1916 – 7 August 1989) was a Mexican politician who was governor of Sinaloa from 1963 to 1968.

He belonged to the Institutional Revolutionary Party (PRI). He served in the Congress of Sinaloa, the federal Chamber of Deputies (for Sinaloa's 4th district, 1955–1958) and, from 1958 to 1964, in the Senate representing Sinaloa.

One of his personal bodyguards was the drug trafficker and ex-police officer Miguel Ángel Félix Gallardo, with whom he maintained an extensive friendship, so much so that Félix Gallardo was the best man at the wedding of one of his sons, Rodolfo Sánchez Duarte, in 1983.

He was tortured and murdered, allegedly on the orders of Félix Gallardo after some fight between Sánchez Celis and him, or because of the alleged links of the governor with drug trafficking.
