= Efraín González Luna =

Mexican politician and lawyer (1898–1964)

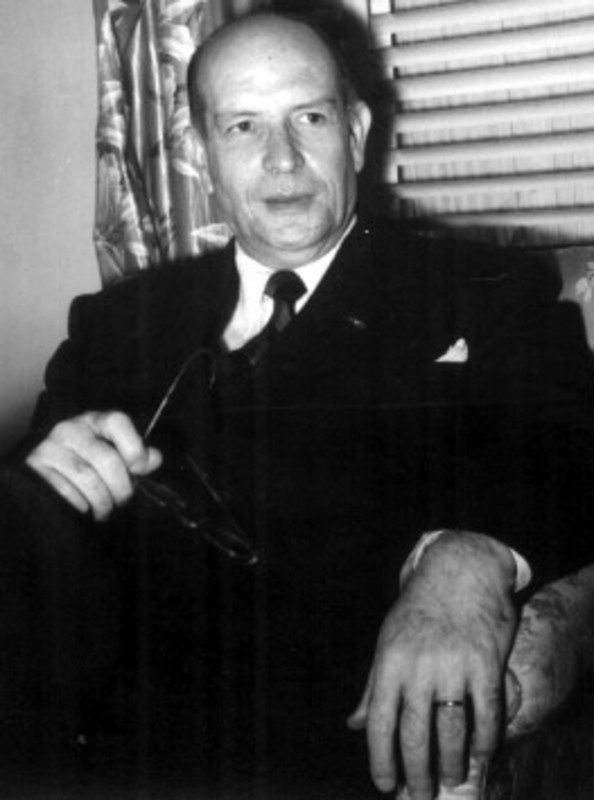
- González Luna in 1951

National Action Party positions
- 1940–1951: President of the Jalisco Regional Committee

Personal details
- Born: 18 October 1898 Autlán, Jalisco, Mexico
- Died: 10 September 1964 (aged 65) Guadalajara, Jalisco, Mexico
- Party: National Action
- Spouse: Amparo Morfín (m. 1923)
- Children: 8, including Efraín
- Relatives: Luis Barragán (brother-in-law)
- Education: University of Guadalajara

Efraín González Luna (18 September 1898 – 10 September 1964) was a Mexican politician and lawyer who was one of the founders and leaders of the National Action Party (PAN). He unsuccessfully ran for president in the 1952 presidential election, making him the party's first presidential candidate. A devout Catholic and a Christian democrat, he played an important role in establishing the party's ideology and its connections to the Catholic Church.

Born in Jalisco to a wealthy family, González Luna studied law at the University of Guadalajara. He became involved in Catholic activism, and in 1939, with Manuel Gómez Morín and others, he co-founded the PAN, a conservative party committed to Christian humanism and liberalism. He served as the president of the party's Jalisco branch from 1940 until 1951. The party did not run presidential candidates in the elections of 1940 and 1946, finally making González Luna their first presidential nominee in the 1952 election. He competed against Adolfo Ruiz Cortines of the incumbent Institutional Revolutionary Party (PRI), and two other candidates, Miguel Henríquez Guzmán and Vicente Lombardo Toledano. Ruiz Cortines won in a landslide, with González Luna coming in a distant third.

Following his loss, he continued to promote the PAN's candidates in Jalisco until his death. In Guadalajara, there is a street named after him and a statue bearing his likeness. The party that he co-founded remained in opposition until rising to prominence in the 1980s and finally winning the presidency in 2000. González Luna's son, Efraín González Morfín, was the PAN's presidential candidate in 1970.

== Early life ==
Efraín González Luna was born on 18 October 1898 in Autlán de la Grana (now Autlán de Navarro), Jalisco. His parents were Mauro Heliodoro González Álvarez and María del Rosario Luna Michel. González Luna was the fifth of eleven children. The family was one of the wealthiest in the region.

González Luna conducted his elementary studies at the Jesuit Colegio del Sagrado Corazón in Autlán from 1906 to 1908. His secondary schooling took place at the Instituto San José from 1908 to 1911. In 1911, the family moved to Guadalajara. González Álvarez served as the mayor of the city from 1913 to 1914. González Luna studied at Morelos University from 1911 to 1914. From 1916 to 1920, he studied law at the Escuela Libre de Jurisprudencia at the University of Guadalajara. He received his degree on 29 October 1920.

From 1925 to 1935, he was a professor of law at the University of Guadalajara, retiring from the position in 1935 after new administrators were appointed that he did not agree with. He ran a private law practice in Guadalajara from 1920 to 1964. During the presidency of Plutarco Elías Calles, González Luna served on the National League for Religious Freedom (Spanish: Liga Nacional de la Libertad Religiosa), which sought to end the conflict between church and state known as the Cristero War through armed means. He joined the Asociación Católica de la Juventud Mexicana (ACJM) in 1921, and served as its president in the early 1930s.

== National Action Party ==
=== Founding the PAN ===
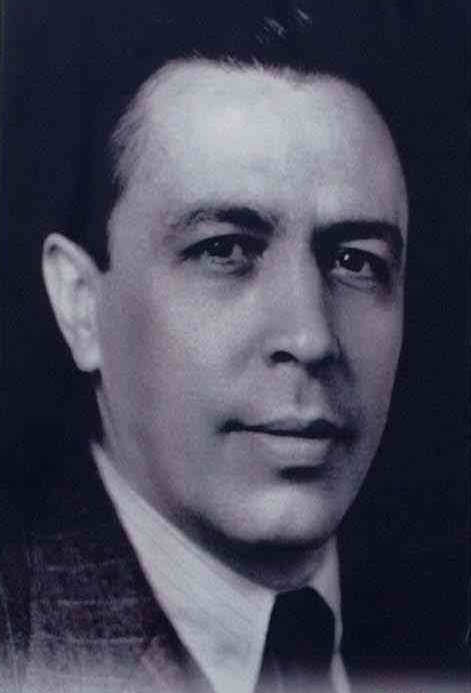
Manuel Gómez Morín, with whom González Luna founded the PAN

In 1939, González Luna met Manuel Gómez Morín, who invited González Luna to form a new party. Gómez Morín was formerly an economic policymaker. At the time, the ruling party was the Institutional Revolutionary Party (Spanish: Partido Revolucionario Institucional), or PRI. The PRI, founded in 1929 by Calles, ruled Mexico hegemonically until the end of the century. The same year as their meeting, Gómez Morín and González Luna, with others, founded the National Action Party (Spanish: Partido Acción Nacional), or PAN. The PAN was conservative, being committed to Catholic humanism and liberalism, and representing a generation dissatisfied with the aftermath of the Mexican Revolution and the "extremism" of Cardenismo, the left-wing populist policies of President Lázaro Cárdenas.

On 30 October 1940, the PAN held a constituent assembly to protocolize and register the party in Jalisco. González Luna became the first president of the PAN's Jalisco Regional Committee, serving from 1940 to 1951. González Luna wrote the PAN's Party Doctrine. He also contributed to La Nación (transl. 'The Nation'), the PAN's official magazine.

=== Early elections ===
The PAN was formed shortly before the 1940 elections. The party debated whether to present a presidential candidate. They ultimately did not, instead endorsing the opposition candidate Juan Andreu Almazán, who lost to Manuel Ávila Camacho of the incumbent PRI. In 1943, the PAN ran their own candidates for the first time. They presented 21 candidates for federal deputies, with them garnering 25,000 votes across the country. González Luna was the PAN's candidate for Jalisco's third electoral district.

For the 1946 elections, the PAN again contemplated running a presidential candidate. At the party's convention, González Luna proposed Luis Cabrera as a "unity candidate" who could appeal to more than just PAN members. Cabrera, who did not have strong support from the party, declined. The PAN then abandoned presidential ambitions for that year, again endorsing an opposition candidate, Ezequiel Padilla Peñaloza. The PAN did run candidates for the Chamber of Deputies and the Senate. They received 51,312 votes, or 2.18% of the total vote. González Luna ran for the same seat that he had sought three years earlier. This time, he attracted a larger vote, but the government did not recognize his victory. The PRI's Miguel Alemán Valdés defeated Padilla.

=== 1952 presidential campaign ===
The PAN held its tenth national convention in 1951. It lasted three days and was attended by 5,000 delegates. On 20 November, The delegates unanimously selected González Luna as the party's presidential candidate for the 1952 election. This made him the PAN's first presidential candidate. His campaign was directed by Jaime Robles León, a fellow PAN co-founder. The other candidates were the PRI's Adolfo Ruiz Cortines, Miguel Henríquez Guzmán of the FPP, and Vicente Lombardo Toledano of the PPS.

From December 1951 until July 1952, González Luna toured most of the country for an intense campaign. In 1951, Rodolfo Sánchez Taboada, the president of the PRI, staged several church visits to promote the party as friendly to Catholics. This was intended to weaken conservative support for González Luna and the PAN. González Luna was endorsed by the National Synarchist Union (UNS), a small far-right party.

González Luna received 285,555 votes, representing 7.82% of the total vote. Ruiz Cortines won with 2,173,419 votes, while Henríquez came in second with 579,745 votes, and Lombardo came in a more distant fourth, with 72,482 votes. The PAN regarded the number of votes González Luna received as a show of strength. He performed best in Mexico City with 51,175 votes, and worst in the territory of Baja California Sur, with 52 votes. In his home state of Jalisco, González Luna placed second with 37,250 votes. He did not get the most votes in any state or territory. Meanwhile, the PAN won five deputies.

=== Final years ===
In 1953, Ruiz Cortines' government passed a law granting women the right to vote in federal elections. González Luna voiced support for the law. José González Torres' term as president of the PAN ended in 1962, and González Luna endorsed Adolfo Christlieb Ibarrola as his successor, who was ultimately successful. In his final years, González Luna focused on directing the PAN in Jalisco, and supported the party's presidential candidates in 1958 and 1964.

== Ideology ==
Ideologically, González Luna was a Christian democrat. Political scientist Judith Gentleman described González Luna as a "militant Catholic". He was convinced of the need for an explicitly Christian political party, and argued that such a group could appeal to the masses, as Mexico had a large Catholic majority. Although González Luna sympathized with the demands of the Catholic militants during the Cristero War, he personally opposed violence, instead supporting nonviolence to protect the rights of Catholics. González Luna being from Guadalajara helped cement the city as a stronghold for Mexico's right-wing, also helped by the city's strong Catholic presence.

== Personal life ==
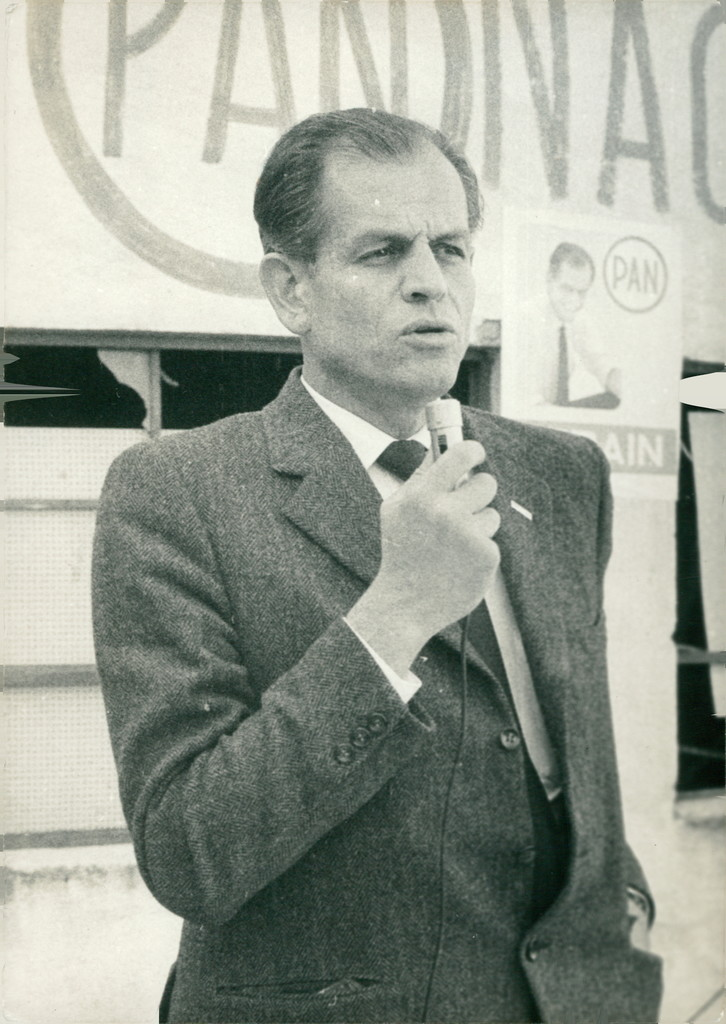
González Luna's son Efraín González Morfín, who was also a PAN politician and presidential candidate

González Luna married Amparo Morfín González on 12 January 1923. They had eight children. Efraín González Luna Morfín, or simply Efraín González Morfín, like his father, was a presidential candidate for the PAN, unsuccessfully running in 1970. Gómez Morín was González Morfín's godfather. Through González Morfín, González Luna had four grandchildren. González Morfín's son Ignacio, like his grandfather, was a PAN candidate in Jalisco in 1964 and 1967, and the president of the PAN in Jalisco from 1965 to 1967.

The house that the family lived in was designed by the famous architect Luis Barragán, who was González Luna's brother-in-law, being married to González Luna's wife's sister. González Luna's brother, Ramiro González Luna, was a federal deputy for PAN from 1967 to 1970, but left the party in 1968.

== Death and legacy ==
González Luna died on 10 September 1964 in a hospital in Guadalajara, after suffering from a cerebral hemorrhage several days earlier. He was buried in the Panteón de Mezquitán. Upon learning of González Luna's death, Gómez Morín reportedly said, "What am I going to do? My brain of the [National Action] Party has died" (Spanish: ¿Qué voy hacer? Se me murió el cerebro del Partido [Acción Nacional]). A street in Guadalajara is named after González Luna. There is a statue of González Luna in the Rotonda de los Jaliscienses Ilustres in Guadalajara, which was finished in 2006.

González Luna's son Efraín González Morfín was the PAN's candidate for the 1970 presidential election. He received 13.98% of the vote, the highest for the party up to that point. González Morfín became president of the PAN in 1975, but resigned the position the same year, and in 1978 he resigned from the party altogether. The party that González Luna co-founded would remain in opposition for much of the 21st century. The PAN finally began seeing larger success in the 1980s after winning several mayorships and finally governorships. They finally obtained the presidency in the 2000 and 2006 presidential elections, governing the country from 2000 to 2012 under Presidents Vicente Fox and Felipe Calderón. They lost the 2012 presidential election, having been in opposition since.
