= Celli =

Celli is an Italian surname. Notable people with the surname include:

- Angelo Celli (1857–1914), Italian physician
- Antonio Celli (1595–1645), Italian Roman Catholic bishop
- Camus Celli, American songwriter, record producer and entrepreneur
- Claudio Maria Celli (born 1941), Italian Roman Catholic archbishop
- Giorgio Celli (1935–2011), Italian politician
- Gregorio Celli (1225–1343), Italian Roman Catholic priest
- Joseph Celli (born 1944), American musician and composer
- Luca Celli (born 1979), Italian cyclist
- Oscar Celli Gerbasi (1946–2016), Venezuelan politician
- Ottorino Celli (born 1980), Italian cyclist
- Paola Celli (born 1967), Italian swimmer
- Rita Celli (born c. 1969), Canadian radio journalist
- Rose Celli (1895–1982), French novelist, playwright, translator and poet
- Teresa Celli (born 1924), American actress
- Vincenzo Celli (1900–1988), Italian-American ballet dancer and choreographer

== See also ==
- Celi, surname
