= 1952 Mexican general election =

- 7 July 1952
- Presidential election
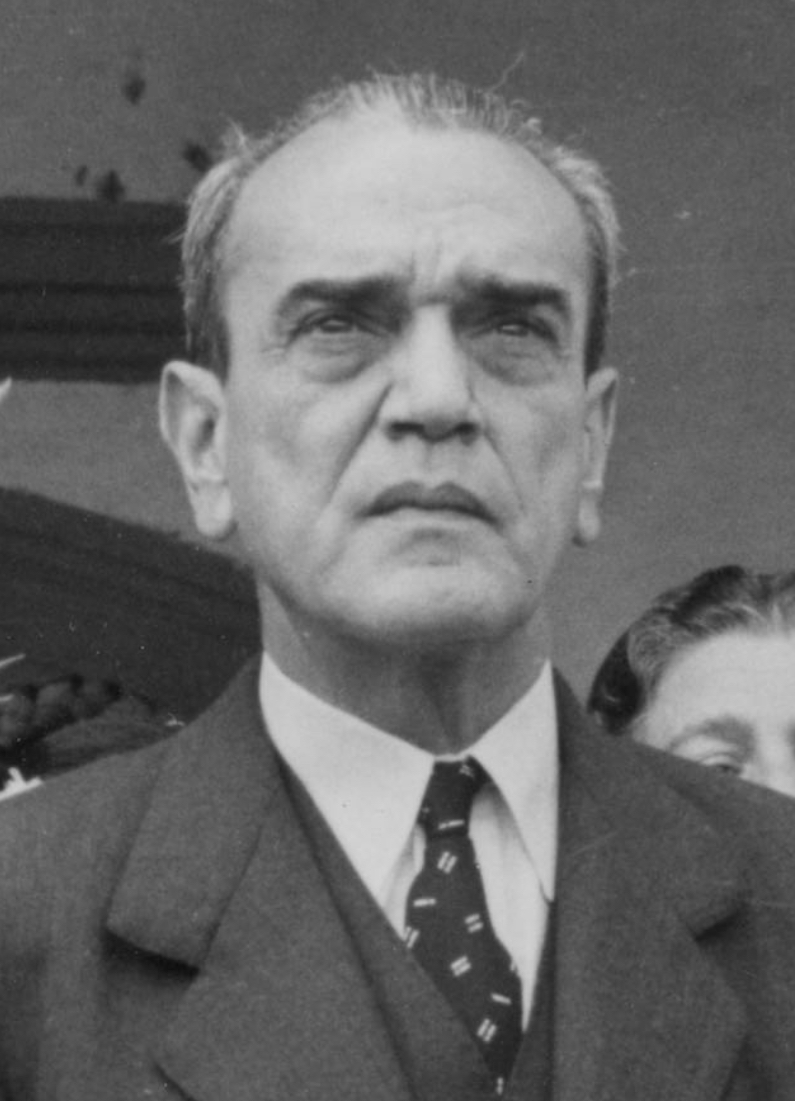

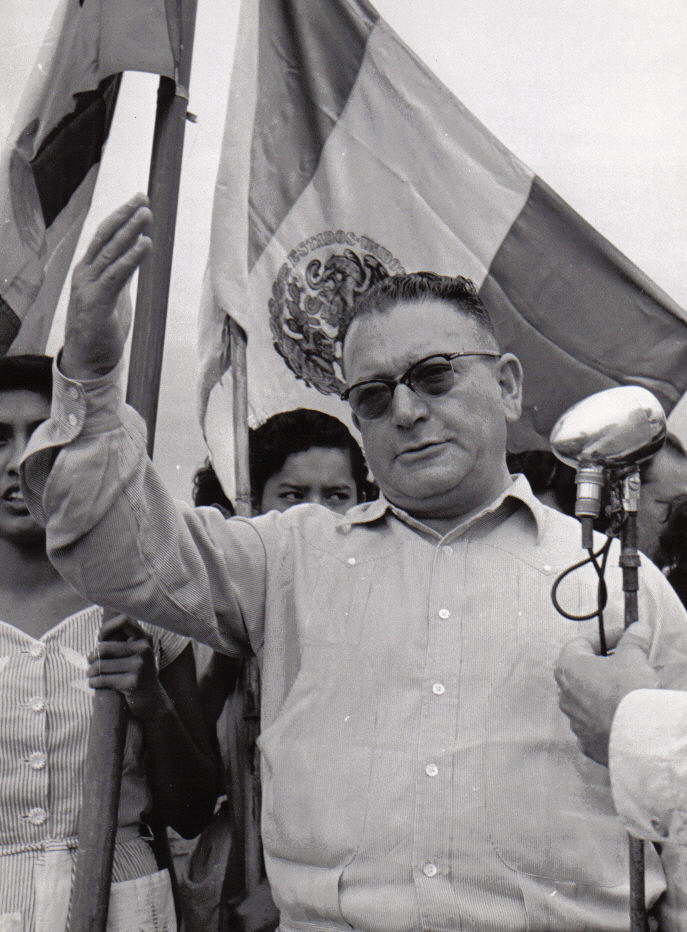

Nominee	Adolfo Ruiz Cortines	Miguel Henríquez Guzmán	Efraín González Luna
Party	PRI	FPPM	PAN
Home state	Veracruz	Coahuila	Jalisco
Popular vote	2,713,419	579,745	285,555
Percentage	74.31%	15.88%	7.82%
President before election
Miguel Alemán Valdés
PRI
Elected President
Adolfo Ruiz Cortines
PRI

General elections were held in Mexico on 7 July 1952. The presidential elections were won by Adolfo Ruiz Cortines of the Institutional Revolutionary Party (PRI), who received 74.3% of the vote. In the Chamber of Deputies election, the PRI won 151 of the 161 seats. These were the last presidential elections in Mexico in which women were not allowed to vote.

== Campaign ==
President Miguel Alemán Valdés appointed his Secretary of the Interior, Adolfo Ruiz Cortines, as the PRI's presidential candidate. The coordinator of Ruiz Cortines's campaign was Adolfo López Mateos, who later succeeded him as president.

Miguel Henríquez Guzmán, a former priísta who left the party in 1951, was nominated as the candidate of the Federation of the Mexican People's Parties (FPPM). The National Action Party (PAN) nominated Efraín González Luna as their first-ever presidential candidate. Finally, the well-known union leader Vicente Lombardo Toledano ran as the candidate of the Popular Party (PP).

The 1952 campaign season saw the model of political advertising aimed at praising the virtues of a party's candidate adopted. It was also the first time in Mexican history that market research was used in a political campaign.

Among the opposition candidates, Henríquez Guzmán became particularly popular. His campaign used a mariachi tune composed for him by Manuel Ramos Trujillo to promote his candidacy. Though this use of campaign jingles was condemned by critics who saw it as taking away the seriousness of politics, the success of the song throughout many regions of the country led to widespread adoption of this and other marketing techniques in future campaigns.

The alleged role of the family of Lázaro Cárdenas (president in 1934–1940) in this election has been widely commented: Amalia Solórzano and Cuauhtémoc Cárdenas — respectively the wife and son of the former president — reportedly supported Henríquez Guzmán's candidacy, while Dámaso Cárdenas (brother of Lázaro and governor of Michoacán at the time) emphatically campaigned in favour of Ruiz Cortines; Lázaro himself was rumoured to be a sympathizer of Henríquez Guzmán, although officially he supported Ruiz Cortines, albeit in a rather discreet manner.

Former Governor of Baja California Sur Francisco José Múgica (by then estranged from the PRI) made some statements during the campaign accusing Ruiz Cortines of having collaborated with the invaders during the 1914 US occupation of Veracruz. Ruiz Cortines denied the accusations and claimed that at the time he was in Mexico City in service of the Revolution under the command of Alfredo Robles Domínguez and Heriberto Jara Corona. Later in the campaign, during a visit to Veracruz on 7 June, the Municipality of Xalapa honoured him with a parchment denying the accusations and naming him a "Patriot and Illustrious Son of Veracruz".

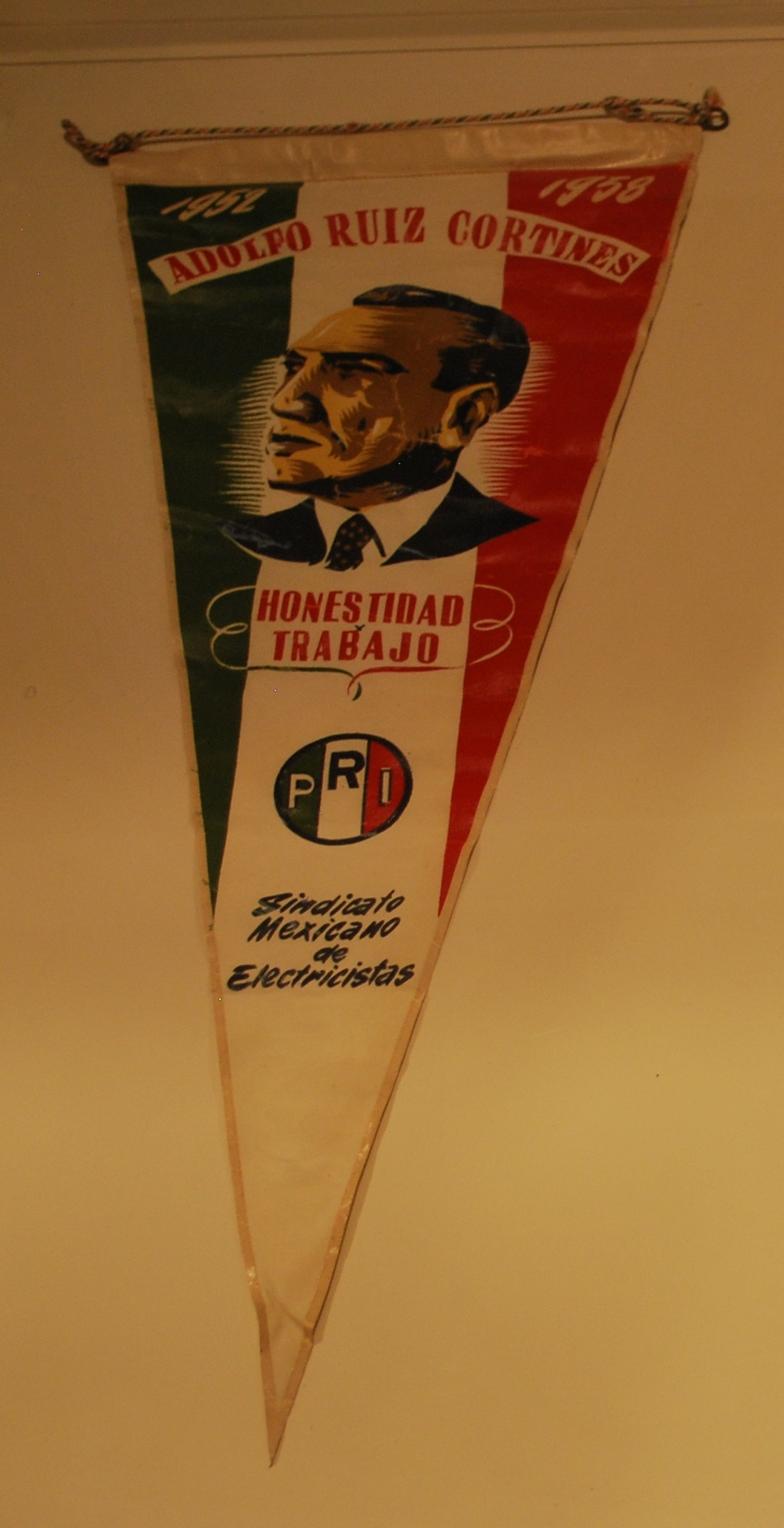
An item from the Ruiz Cortines campaign.

== Results ==
=== President ===
Candidate	Party	Votes	%
Adolfo Ruiz Cortines	Institutional Revolutionary Party (PRI)	2,713,419	74.31
Miguel Henríquez Guzmán	Federation of Parties of the Mexican People (FPPM)	579,745	15.88
Efraín González Luna	National Action Party (PAN)	285,555	7.82
Vicente Lombardo Toledano	Popular Party (PP)	72,482	1.99
Other candidates		282	0.01
Total		3,651,483	100.00
Registered voters/turnout		4,924,293	–
Source: Nohlen

=== Senate ===
Party	Seats
Institutional Revolutionary Party (PRI)	60
Total	60
Source: UNAM

=== Chamber of Deputies ===
Party	Votes	%	Seats	+/–
Institutional Revolutionary Party (PRI)	2,713,419	74.31	151	+9
Federation of the Mexican People's Parties (FPPM)	579,745	15.88	2	New
National Action Party (PAN)	301,986	8.27	5	+1
Popular Party (PP)	32,194	0.88	2	+1
Nationalist Party of Mexico (PNM)	24,139	0.66	1	New
Total	3,651,483	100.00	161	+14
Registered voters/turnout	4,924,293	–		
Source: Nohlen, Chamber of Deputies, UNAM

== Aftermath ==
In the official election count, Ruiz Cortines won with more than 74 percent of the popular vote, followed by Henríquez Guzmán with 16 percent. These results set off a wave of protests in several states by Henríquez supporters, which were violently suppressed by the administration of Miguel Alemán Valdés. Among those calling for justice were the former Mexican ambassador to Honduras, José Muñoz Cota Ibáñez, and Alicia Pérez Salazar.

Some military chiefs, sympathizers of Henríquez Guzmán and aligned with former president Lázaro Cárdenas, seized the opportunity and proposed to carry out a coup d'état so that Henríquez would become president. However, it was Henríquez himself who rejected the plan, and instead he asked his supporters to stop the violent protests. Despite the intensity of the protests, the results stood, and as a result Henríquez Guzmán then retired from public life.

Many years after the election, Ruiz Cortines revealed that only five weeks before he was scheduled to take office, he underwent a surgery to get rid of a hernia; to keep the surgery as a secret from the media, an operating room was temporally installed in Ruiz Cortines's Mexico City residence. After the successful surgery, Ruiz Cortines took office as scheduled on 1 December.
