= Celis =

Celis may refer to:

- Celis, Spain, a town in Cantabria, Spain
- Celis (beer), a Texas-based beer brand

== People ==
- Celis Pérez (1939–2008), birth name of Argentine artist Pérez Celis

== Surname ==
- Alfonso Celis Jr., Mexican race driver
- Eduardo Martínez Celis (1890–1943), Mexican journalist, author
- Eulogio F. de Celis, American landowner and newspaper publisher
- Guillermo Celis (born 1993), Colombian footballer
- Gustavo Celis, American music engineer, mixer and producer
- Johanna Ismael Celis, better known as Kiráy, Filipina actress
- Matías Celis (born 1989), Chilean footballer
- Mely Romero Celis, Mexican politician
- Nicolás Celis (born 1984), Peruvian footballer
- Pérez Celis, Argentinian artist
- Pierre Celis (1925–2011), Belgian brewer
- Raúl Celis López (1955–2025), Peruvian journalist
- Ricardo Celis, Mexican sportscaster
- Sancho Dávila y Fernández de Celis (1905–1972), Spanish politician
- Santiago José Celis (1782-1814), Salvadoran physician and activist
- Stijn Celis, Belgian choreographer
- Vera Celis (born 1959), Belgian politician

== See also ==
- Celes (disambiguation)
- Celi (disambiguation)
