= Germán Sierra Sánchez =

Mexican politician

- Born: 27 September 1956 (age 69); Puebla, Puebla, Mexico
- Occupation: Politician
- Political party: PRI

Germán Sierra Sánchez (born 27 September 1956) is a Mexican politician affiliated with the Institutional Revolutionary Party (PRI).

Sierra Sánchez was elected to the Chamber of Deputies in the 1985 mid-term election (53rd session of Congress) for Puebla's 12th congressional district.

He later served in the Senate for the state of Puebla during the 55th and 56th sessions of Congress (1991–1997), and again during the 58th and 59th sessions (2000–2006).
