= Efrain Guigui =

Panama-born clarinetist and conductor (1925–2007)

- Born: September 19, 1925; Panama
- Died: June 18, 2007 (aged 81); Los Angeles, California, U.S.
- Education: Student Music Conservatory; Boston University
- Occupations: Clarinetist, conductor
- Children: 2

Efrain Guigui (September 19, 1925 – June 18, 2007) was a US-based Panamanian born clarinetist and conductor.

== Early life ==
Guigui was born on September 19, 1925, in Panama. He grew up in Argentina, where he attended the Student Music Conservatory in Buenos Aires. He graduated from Boston University with a degree in conducting and composition.

== Career ==
At the age of 15, Guigui was the youngest clarinetist to ever play first chair in the Buenos Aires Symphony Orchestra, at the Teatro Colón, where he played under the tutelage of such conductors as Herbert von Karajan, Otto Klemperer and Arturo Toscanini.

In the 1950s Guigui met and worked with composer Aaron Copland, who later invited Guigui to the United States to conduct in Tanglewood, where Guigui remained, studying at Boston University, graduating with high honors. Guigui and his wife Elena moved to New York City in 1960 where Guigui played clarinet in the New York Philharmonic under the direction of Leonard Bernstein. Guigui made his American debut as conductor at The Town Hall and went on to tour with the American Ballet Theatre.

Guigui was then invited by Pablo Casals to San Juan, Puerto Rico, to play clarinet with the Casals Festival and conduct the Puerto Rico Symphony Orchestra. Guigui and his family all moved to and lived in Puerto Rico, where Guigui was also a full-time professor at the Conservatory of Music. Guigui went on to work alongside the likes of Itzhak Perlman, Isaac Stern, Yehudi Menuhin, Daniel Barenboim, Luciano Pavarotti, Plácido Domingo, and Alexander Schneider.

Guigui was the conductor of the Vermont Symphony Orchestra from 1974 to 1989. He also conducted orchestras as a guest in South America. Additionally, he was a guest conductor at the Juilliard School in New York City.

Guigui taught clarinet and conducting at Dartmouth College where he also conducted the Dartmouth Symphony.

Guigui founded the Panama Youth Orchestra.

Guigui established a children's orchestra in Mexico. He was the recipient of the Governor's Award for Excellence in the Arts from the Vermont Council on the Arts in 1989.

In 1986 Guigui won the Ditson Conductor's Award.

Guigui and his childhood best friend, Pulitzer Prize-winning composer Mario Davidovsky, ran the Composers Conference for 40 years, with Guigui making over 3,000 recordings.

Just prior to his death, Guigui conducted three sold-out nights of the Rachmaninoff Competition at Walt Disney Concert Hall in Los Angeles, to standing ovations.

== Death ==
Guigui died on June 18, 2007, of complications from sarcoma cancer, in Los Angeles, California.
