= 1970 Mexican general election =

- 5 July 1970
- Presidential election
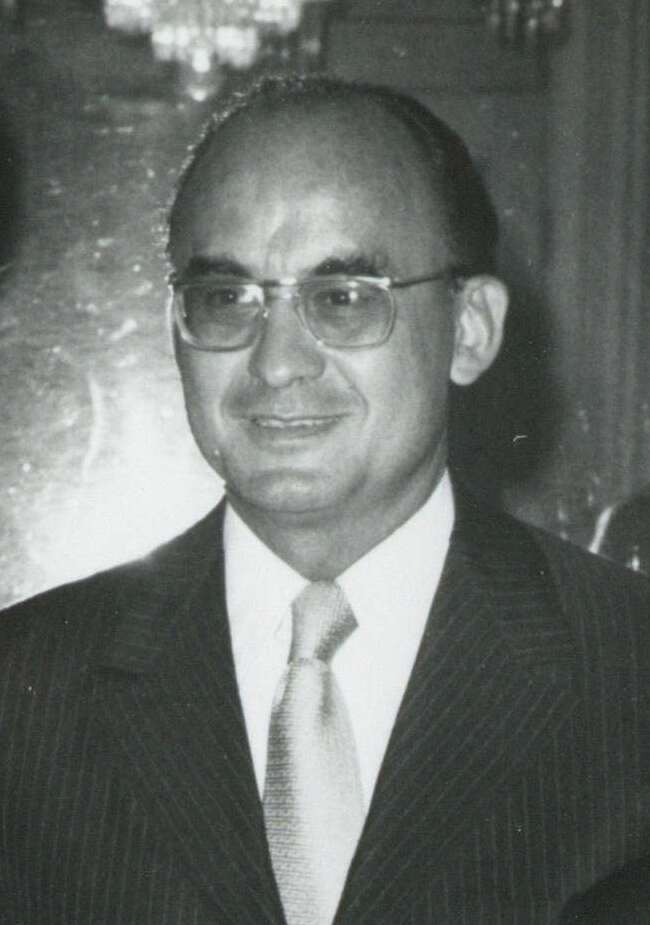

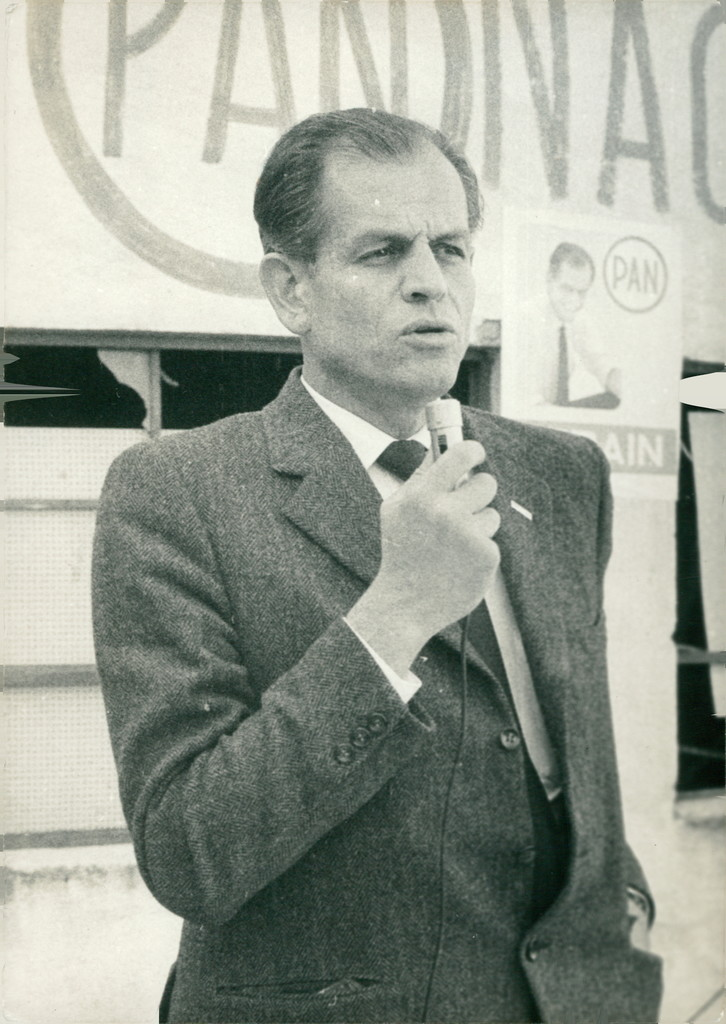
Nominee	Luis Echeverría	Efraín González Morfín
Party	PRI	PAN
Popular vote	11,970,893	1,945,070
Percentage	86.02%	13.98%
- Votes for Luis Echeverría by state: 60–70% 70–80% 80–90% 90–100%
President before election
Gustavo Díaz Ordaz
PRI
Elected President
Luis Echeverría
PRI

General elections were held in Mexico on 5 July 1970. The presidential elections were won by Luis Echeverría, who received 86% of the vote. In the Chamber of Deputies election, the Institutional Revolutionary Party won 178 of the 213 seats, as well as winning all 64 seats in the Senate election. Voter turnout in the legislative elections was 64%.

== Designation of the PRI presidential candidate ==
Among the many individuals considered by President Díaz Ordaz to succeed him were Alfonso Corona del Rosal (Head of the Federal District Department), Luis Echeverría (Secretary of the Interior) and Emilio Martínez Manatou (Secretary of the Presidency).

According to Jorge G. Castañeda, Díaz Ordaz arrived at a final decision in the aftermath of the 1968 Tlatelolco massacre, in which the Army killed a multitude of unarmed protesters in Mexico City after months of student protests across the country. The massacre was a turning point in Mexican history, and the exact responsibility of the officials involved in it continues to be debated, with many asserting that the Secretary of the Interior, Echeverría, was the one who ordered the troops to shoot at the protesters.

With the 1970 elections ahead, Díaz Ordaz "disqualified" both Corona del Rosal and Martínez Manatou from becoming the PRI presidential candidates: in the former's case, because Díaz Ordaz feared that, in the aftermath of the Tlatelolco massacre, Corona del Rosal would be rejected by the population due to his military background; while in the case of Martínez Manatou, he was seen as too close to the dissident sectors that had been behind the 1968 movement.

Therefore, Díaz Ordaz decided on Echeverría, who didn't have a military background but had unmistakably been a loyal hardliner not just during the events of 1968, but during the entire Díaz Ordaz administration.

In an extraordinary move, during his annual Address to the Congress on 1 September 1969, President Díaz Ordaz assumed the full "personal, ethical, social, judicial, political and historical responsibility" for the government's decisions during the 1968 events. This was interpreted by many as the definitive signal that the President had decided on Echeverría to be his successor, as Díaz Ordaz was assuming complete responsibility for the repression, clearing Echeverría of any culpability. Indeed, two months later, on 8 November 1969 the PRI formally announced that Echeverría would be the party's candidate for the 1970 presidential elections.

Before being nominated as presidential candidate, Echeverría had never held a popularly elected post; he would be the first in a series of PRI presidential candidates (and thus Presidents of Mexico) until 1993, (Note: In 1993 the PRI nominated Luis Donaldo Colosio, who had previously been elected to the Congress as Deputy and Senator, but after his assassination in March 1994 he was replaced by Ernesto Zedillo, who had never held a popularly elected post before.) who had never been elected to any office before receiving the presidential nomination.

== Campaign ==
In addition to being nominated by the PRI, Echeverría was also nominated by the Authentic Party of the Mexican Revolution (PARM) and the Popular Socialist Party (PPS), two traditional PRI satellites. The coordinator of the Echeverría campaign was Alfonso Martínez Domínguez, who was also President of the PRI. The only opposition candidate in the presidential race was Efraín González Morfín, a former legislator, nominated by the right-wing National Action Party (PAN)

Whereas Echeverría had been a hardliner during the Díaz Ordaz administration, and had been known as a discreet bureaucrat during his entire career, upon becoming the Presidential candidate he radically changed his image, adopting a populist rhetoric towards the peasants and the students; this was likely to shake off the accusations that he had been responsible for the Tlatelolco massacre. As Enrique Krauze puts it, Echeverría became "immediately obsessed with making people forget that he had ever done it."

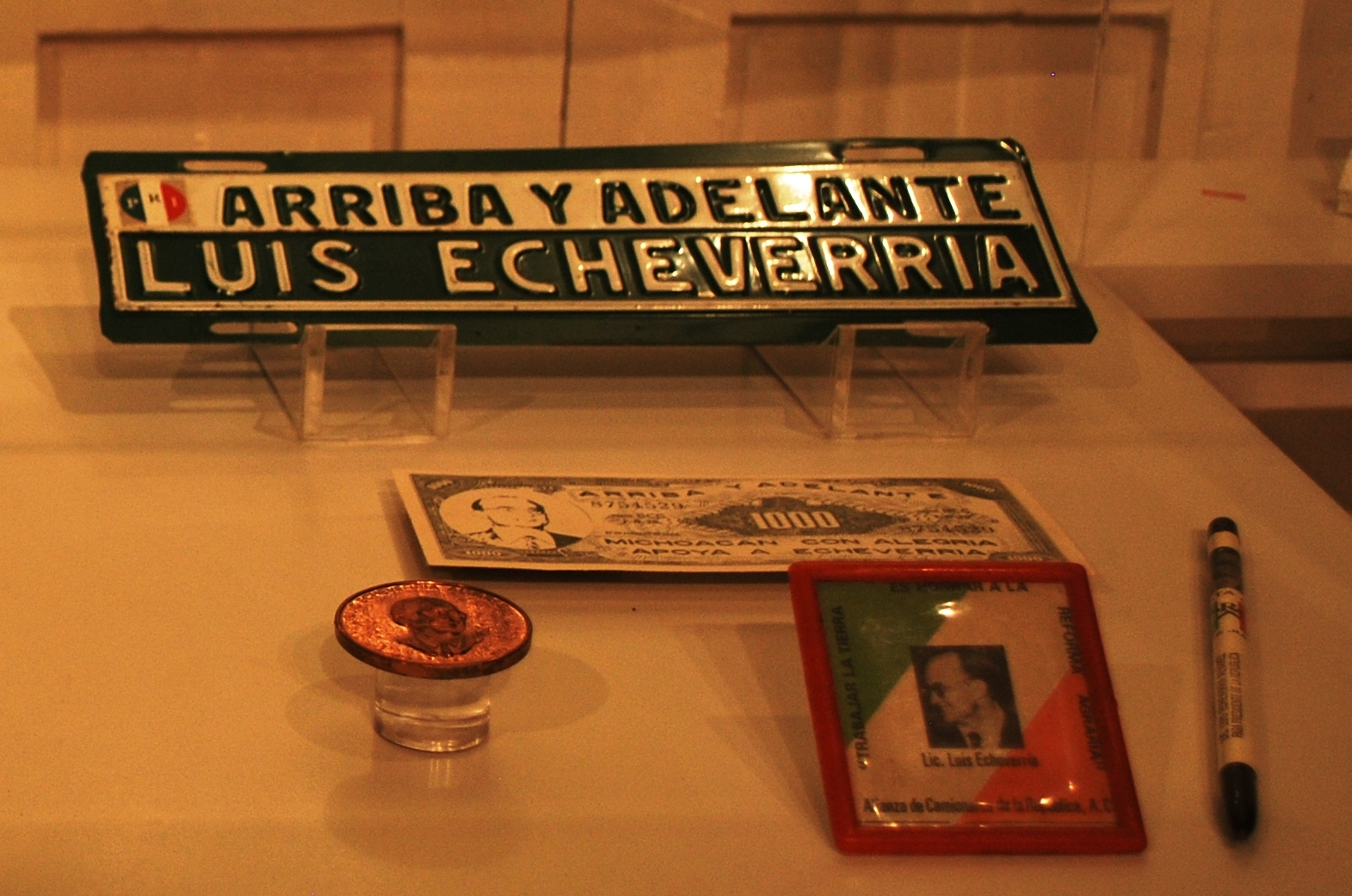
Various Echeverría campaign items; the sign at the top features his campaign motto "Arriba y adelante" ("Upwards and onwards").

A confusing incident in November 1969 (shortly after Echeverría was officially nominated as the PRI presidential candidate) provoked controversy and almost led to Echeverría being replaced. During a visit to the Universidad Michoacana de San Nicolás de Hidalgo (popularly known as the "Nicolaita University"), Echeverría gave an address that had a mixed reception among the students present. Shortly after finishing the address and as the candidate prepared to leave the building, one of the students shouted demanding everyone present to keep a minute of silence in memory of the students massacred in Tlatelolco. Echeverría and his aides were shocked, and he agreed to keep a minute of silence "for the dead, for both the students and the soldiers who died in Tlatelolco", after which the entire audience, including Echeverría, kept the minute of silence.

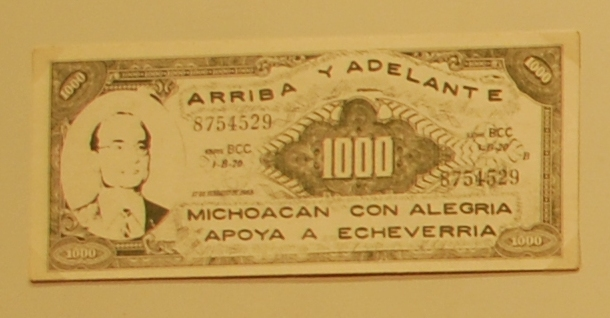
A contribution bond for the Echeverría campaign.

The military chiefs, including the Secretary of the Defense Marcelino García Barragán, were outraged by the incident and expressed their indignation to president Díaz Ordaz, stating that the Armed Forces would no longer support Echeverría and demanding that he be replaced as the party's candidate. Nonetheless, Díaz Ordaz stood by Echeverría, who the next day gave an address in which he praised the Armed Forces. In early January 1970, Echeverría and García Barragán met at the latter's ranch in Autlán to definitely put aside the conflict.

Traditionally, PRI presidential candidates would undertake extensive tours of the national territory during their campaigns, and Echeverría in particular visited more than 900 towns, was seen in person by 10 million people and traveled more than 56,000 kilometers on his campaign bus, which he named "Miguel Hidalgo" after the independence hero. Echeverría was notorious for usually wearing guayaberas on his tours and campaign rallies.

Echeverría promised that his government would not be "neither to the right nor to the left, but upward and onward". The tensions with the students continued, and on one occasion, Echeverría defended the jailing of the students who had participated in the 1968 protests, stating that no one had been arrested "for writing a novel or a poem or for his way of thinking". Echeverría was also contrary to the implementation of policies to lower the high population growth rate (which was then of 3.5% per year), stating that the size of families was "a private matter for parents to decide" and that it wasn't "a proper area for the state".

There were many songs written for the Echeverría campaign; two of them, "Corrido de Luis Echeverría" and "Arriba y Adelante" were recorded by popular ranchera singer Francisco "Charro" Avitia.

== Results ==
=== President ===
Candidate	Party	Votes	%
Luis Echeverría	Institutional Revolutionary Party	11,970,893	86.02
Efraín González Morfín	National Action Party	1,945,070	13.98
Total		13,915,963	100.00
Registered voters/turnout		21,654,217	–
Source: Nohlen

==== By state ====
State	Echeverría Álvarez (PRI + PARM + PPS)		González Morfín (PAN)		Unregistered candidates		Null votes		Total
State	Votes	%	Votes	%	Votes	%	Votes	%	Total
Aguascalientes	82,845	87.05%	11,959	12.56%	355	0.37%	0	0%	95.159
Baja California	207,126	73.28%	72,175	25.53%	374	0.13%	2,945	1.04%	282,620
Baja California Sur	35,661	93.84%	2,023	5.32%	103	0.27%	211	0.55%	37,998
Campeche	90,018	97.44%	1,768	1.91%	269	0.29%	323	0.34%	92,378
Chiapas	442,335	98.91%	4,853	1.08%	0	0%	0	0%	447,188
Chihuahua	356,852	78.33%	83,120	18.24%	882	0.19%	14,709	3.22%	455,563
Coahuila	314,547	91.09%	30,350	8.78%	187	0.05%	207	0.05%	345,291
Colima	49,085	90.43%	5,005	9.22%	10	0.01%	175	0.32%	54,275
Durango	188,934	86.67%	28,895	13.25%	143	6.56%	0	0%	217,972
Federal District	1,567,509	66.18%	696,641	29.41%	13,784	0.58%	90,563	3.82%	2,368,497
Guanajuato	459,328	80.74%	108,938	19.15%	56	0.009%	539	0.09%	568,861
Guerrero	451,436	95.63%	20,341	4.30%	242	0.05%	0	0%	472,019
Hidalgo	438,739	97.00%	12,798	2.82%	198	0.04%	561	0.12%	452,296
Jalisco	804,838	81.67%	167,629	17.01%	1,877	0.19%	11,037	1.12%	985,381
Michoacán	544,176	86.25%	82,909	13.14%	221	0.03%	3,603	0.57%	630,909
Morelos	163,512	90.17%	17,583	9.69%	22	0.01%	211	0.11%	181,328
Nayarit	129,067	80.03%	4,686	2.90%	27	0.01%	27,486	17.04%	161,266
Nuevo León	360,328	83.65%	67,704	15.71%	1,040	0.24%	1,668	0.38%	430,740
Oaxaca	661,068	96.57%	23,465	3.42%	0	0%	0	0%	684,533
Puebla	568,028	84.76%	96,313	14.37%	381	0.05%	5,380	0.80%	670,102
Querétaro	133,480	90.35%	13,620	9.21%	43	0.02%	582	0.39%	147,732
Quintana Roo	32,069	97.86%	528	1.61%	3	0.009%	167	0.50%	32,767
San Luis Potosí	331,999	90.04%	35,947	9.74%	126	0.03%	625	0.16%	368,697
Sinaloa	269,202	94.29%	15,440	5.40%	282	0.09%	572	0.20%	285,486
Sonora	211,673	93.34%	14,714	6.48%	384	0.16%	0	0%	226,771
State of Mexico	744,826	84.19%	134,949	15.25%	1,142	0.12%	3,753	0.42%	884,670
Tabasco	235,763	99.01%	2,355	0.98%	0	0%	0	0%	238,118
Tamaulipas	374,493	91.45%	34.209	8.35%	285	0.06%	512	0.12%	409,499
Tlaxcala	117,357	93.86%	7,098	5.67%	90	0.07%	35	0.02%	125,028
Veracruz	1,068,571	90.48%	84,422	7.14%	252	0.02%	27,668	2.34%	1,180,913
Yucatán	205,284	85.24%	35,546	14.76%	0	0%	0	0%	240,830
Zacatecas	261,556	90.74%	26,643	9.24%	37	0.01%	0	0%	288,236
Total	11,902,153	84.63%	1,944,626	13.82%	22,815	0.16%	193,539	1.37%	14,063,133
Source: CEDE

=== Senate ===
Party	Votes	%	Seats	+/–
Institutional Revolutionary Party	11,154,003	84.35	60	0
National Action Party	1,889,157	14.29	0	0
Popular Socialist Party	143,648	1.09	0	0
Authentic Party of the Mexican Revolution	3,476	0.03	0	0
Non-registered candidates	33,568	0.25	0	0
Total	13,223,852	100.00	60	0
Valid votes	13,223,852	94.86		
Invalid/blank votes	717,010	5.14		
Total votes	13,940,862	100.00		
Registered voters/turnout	21,654,217	64.38		
Source: Nohlen

Four other senators from the governing PRI took their seats in a by-election in 1975 to conclude the 1970-1976 term.

=== Chamber of Deputies ===
Party	Votes	%	Seats	+/–
Institutional Revolutionary Party	11,125,770	83.31	178	+1
National Action Party	1,893,289	14.18	20	0
Popular Socialist Party	188,854	1.41	10	0
Authentic Party of the Mexican Revolution	111,883	0.84	5	0
Non-registered candidates	35,192	0.26	0	0
Total	13,354,988	100.00	213	+1
Valid votes	13,354,988	95.80		
Invalid/blank votes	585,874	4.20		
Total votes	13,940,862	100.00		
Registered voters/turnout	21,654,217	64.38		
Source: Nohlen
