= Acatzingo de Hidalgo =

- Location within Puebla (state)
- Coordinates: 18°58′54″N 97°46′56″W
- Country: Mexico
- State: Puebla
- Municipality: Huatabampo
- Elevation: 2,140 m (7,020 ft)

Population (2010)
  - Total: 52,078
- Time zone: UTC-6 (Central Standard Time)

Acatzingo de Hidalgo is a city and the seat of Acatzingo municipality located in, Puebla, Mexico, at 2,140 meters above sea level. The urban center is located between Citlaltépetl and Malinche at a distance of about 50 km from the city of Puebla de Zaragoza.
