= Gabriel Leyva Velázquez =

Politician and military man of Sinaloa

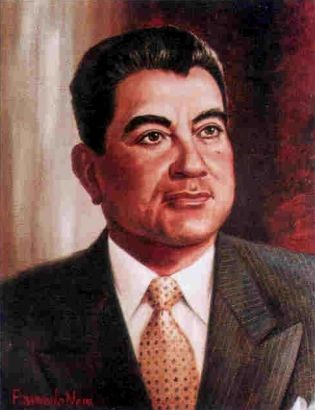
- Portrait of Gabriel Leyva Velázquez

Governor of Sinaloa
- In office January 1, 1957 – December 31, 1962
- Preceded by: Rigoberto Aguilar Pico
- Succeeded by: Leopoldo Sánchez Celis

Personal details
- Born: June 30, 1896 Los Humayes, San Ignacio, Sinaloa
- Died: March 19, 1985 (aged 88) Mexico City

Gabriel Leyva Velázquez (June 30, 1896 - March 19, 1985) was a Mexican military man and politician. He was born in Los Humayes, San Ignacio, Sinaloa, on June 30, 1896. At the age of 14 he was orphaned. He studied at the Normal School of Teachers in Mexico City. He was appointed a member of Pablo Macías Valenzuela's General Staff. Once the revolution was over he fought in the Cristero War. He held various positions in the federal government and was interim governor of Sinaloa in 1935. He was governor of Sinaloa from January 1, 1957 to December 31, 1962. During his mandate, several works were carried out, such as the Theater of the Americas at the General Insurgentes Secondary School in Guasave, the Constitución Civic Center and the Sinaloa History Museum. Several decree initiatives were given to be analyzed and voted on in the State Congress, such as the Bill for the Promotion of Popular Housing and Reforms to the Law of Urban Subdivisions. He died in Mexico City on March 19, 1985.
