= Federation of Parties of the Mexican People =

Defunct political party in Mexico

Federation of Parties of the Mexican People Federación de Partidos del Pueblo Mexicano
- Abbreviation: FPPM
- Leader: Genovevo de la O
- Founded: 1945
- Dissolved: 1954
- Ideology: Socialism; Factions: Zapatismo; Cardenism; Agrarianism
- Political position: Left-wing

The Federation of Parties of the Mexican People (Spanish: Federación de Partidos del Pueblo Mexicano) was a federation of socialist political parties that existed from 1945 to 1954.

The alliance was founded by Genovevo de la O, a former Zapatista commander, in 1945. The FPPM drew most of its support from left wing academics and soldiers who had grown disillusioned with the almost omnipotent Institutional Revolutionary Party (PRI) and believed the PRI no longer represented the ideas of the Mexican Revolution. Notable members of the FPPM were Marcelino García Barragán, Rubén Jaramillo, Francisco José Múgica, José C. Valadés and Miguel Henríquez Guzmán. Most of them had been supporters of Emiliano Zapata and other revolutionary leaders, and the FPPM was notable for being the last split from the PRI that included leaders who had participated in the Revolution.

Henríquez Guzmán was the presidential candidate for the FPPM in the 1952 presidential elections. Henríquez claimed to have been victorious, but the official result showed PRI candidate Adolfo Ruiz Cortines to be the winner. FPPM supporters organized a protest march against the alleged election fraud, but the government responded with a violent crackdown on the protesters.

In 1954 the government accused the alliance of involvement in a terrorist attack against an army barracks in Ciudad Madera, Chihuahua, and the alliance was banned.

== See also ==
- es:Masacre en La Alameda: government crackdown on the demonstration by FPPM supporters in central Mexico City on 7 July 1952
