= Miguel Henríquez Guzmán =

Mexican politician and military officer

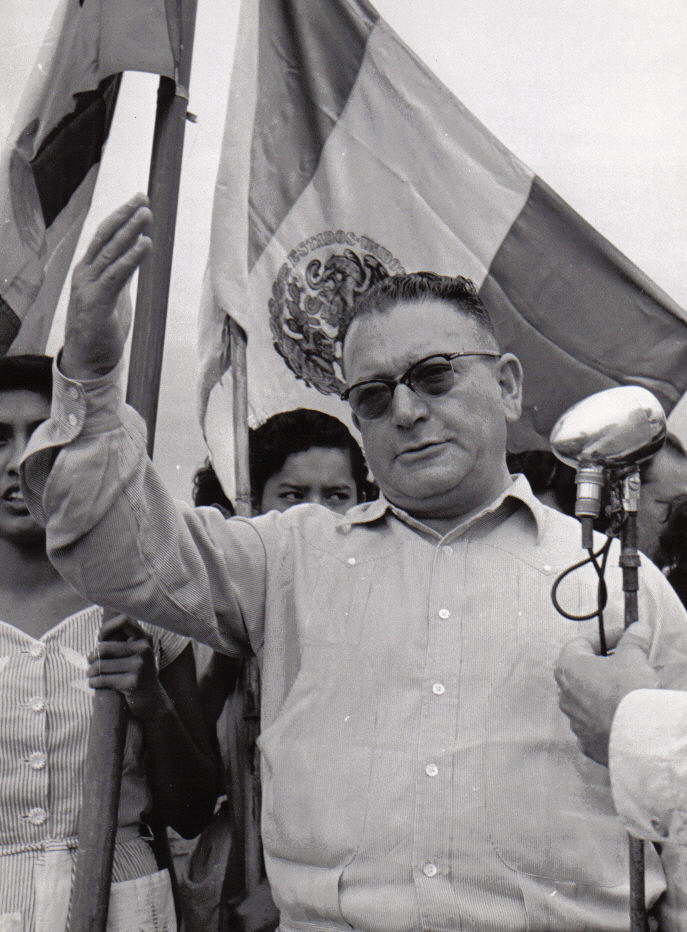

Personal details
- Born: August 4, 1898 Piedras Negras, Coahuila
- Died: August 29, 1972 (aged 74) Mexico City, Mexico
- Party: Institutional Revolutionary Party
- Relations: Jorge Henríquez Guzmán
- Occupation: Politician, Military officer

Miguel Henríquez Guzmán (August 4, 1898 – August 29, 1972) was a Mexican politician and military officer.

== Biography ==
Henríquez Guzmán was born on August 4, 1898, in Piedras Negras, Coahuila.

In the 1952 general election, he was the presidential candidate of the Federation of the Mexican People's Parties. He won 579,745 votes, which was 15.87% of the popular vote. He came in second to the winner, Adolfo Ruiz Cortines, but his vote count was higher than Efraín González Luna and Vicente Lombardo Toledano.

After his loss, he retired from politics and devoted himself to studying Mexico's social problems. He died in Mexico City on August 29, 1972.

Party political offices
Preceded by None	FPPM presidential candidate 1952 (lost)	Succeeded by None
