= Efraín González Morfín =

Mexican politician

Efraín González Morfin
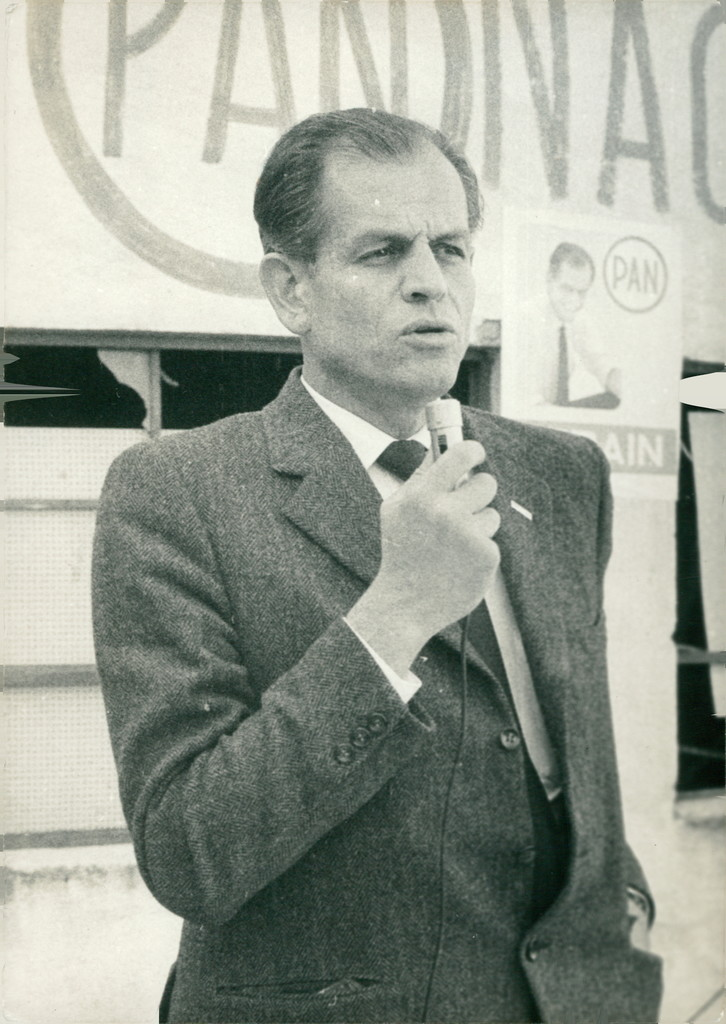

Secretary of Education of Jalisco
- In office 1 March 1995 – 16 December 1998
- Governor: Alberto Cárdenas
- Preceded by: Guillermo Reyes Robles
- Succeeded by: Miguel Agustín Limón Macías

President of the National Action Party
- In office 9 March 1975 – 13 December 1975
- Preceded by: José Ángel Conchello
- Succeeded by: Raúl González Schmal

Member of the Chamber of Deputies
- In office 1 September 1967 – 17 August 1970

Personal details
- Born: June 5, 1929 Guadalajara, Mexico
- Died: October 21, 2012 (aged 83) Zapopan, Mexico
- Party: National Action Party
- Spouse: Monica Marseille
- Children: 4
- Parents: Efraín González Luna (father); Amparo Morfín González (mother)
- Education: Universidad Iberoamericana
- Occupation: Lawyer, politician

Efraín González-Luna Morfín (June 5, 1929 – October 21, 2012) was a Mexican lawyer and politician who ran for president in the 1970 Mexican general election as a member of the National Action Party.

== Early life ==
Born on June 5, 1929, into a marriage between Efraín González Luna (one of the PAN's founders) and Amparo Morfín González, Efraín is the fourth of eight children.

He enrolled in the Society of Jesus' novitiate in the province of Mexico when he was 16 years old. Just before receiving his priestly ordination in 1959, he made the decision to depart as a Jesuit while studying theology in Innsbruck, Austria. He afterwards attended Paris's Sorbonne to study. After returning to Mexico, he joined the National Action Party and graduated from Universidad Iberoamericana with a law degree.

He married Monique Marseille Orendain in 1960 at age 31, and they both eventually raised 4 children. He held positions as director of the law department and professor at Ibero, as well as teaching positions at Iteso and the University of Guadalajara.

== Career ==
He served as a federal deputy in the 47th Congress (1967–1970), representing the Federal District's eighth district for the National Action Party. Two years later he assumed the Regional leadership of the National Action Party in the Federal District.

=== 1970 Mexican General election ===
He was selected by the National Action Party in 1969 to run for president in the 1970 general election, but Luis Echeverría Álvarez of the Institutional Revolutionary Party defeated him.

1,945,000 votes, or roughly 13.82% of the total, were cast in favor of González Morfín.

==== President of the National Action Party ====
González Morfín was also President of the National Action Party, elected to that position in 1975.

==== Secretary of Education of Jalisco ====
The last position he held was that of Secretary of Education of the government of Jalisco, during the six-year term of Alberto Cárdenas from 1995 to 1998.

== Later life ==
González Morfín died on October 21, 2012, at the age of 83 after having suffered health complications that kept him in intensive care.
