= 2018 in Mexico =

- Decades: 1990s; 2000s; 2010s; 2020s
- See also: History of Mexico; List of years in Mexico; Timeline of Mexican history

This is a list of events that happened in 2018 in Mexico. The article also lists the most important political leaders during the year at both federal and state levels.

== Incumbents ==
=== President ===
- President
  - Enrique Peña Nieto Institutional Revolutionary Party PRI, until November 30
  - Andrés Manuel López Obrador (AMLO) MORENA, starting December 1

=== Governors ===
- Aguascalientes: Martín Orozco Sandoval PAN
- Baja California: Francisco Vega de Lamadrid PAN
- Baja California Sur: Carlos Mendoza Davis PAN
- Campeche: Alejandro Moreno Cárdenas PRI
- Chiapas:
  - Manuel Velasco Coello PVEM, until December 7
  - Rutilio Escandón MORENA, starting December 8
- Chihuahua: Javier Corral Jurado PAN
- Coahuila: Miguel Ángel Riquelme Solís PRI
- Colima: José Ignacio Peralta PRI
- Distrito Federal / Mexico City:
  - Miguel Ángel Mancera, Independent, until March 29, 2018
  - José Ramón Amieva, PRD March 29, 2018 – December 4, 2018
  - Claudia Sheinbaum MORENA, starting December 5, 2018
- Durango: José Rosas Aispuro PAN
- Guanajuato:
  - Miguel Márquez Márquez, until September 25
  - Diego Sinhué Rodríguez Vallejo PAN, starting September 26
- Guerrero: Héctor Astudillo Flores PRI
- Hidalgo: Omar Fayad PRI
- Jalisco:
  - Aristóteles Sandoval, until December 5
  - Enrique Alfaro Ramírez, Independent, starting December 6
- México (state): Alfredo del Mazo Maza PRI
- Michoacán: Silvano Aureoles Conejo PRD
- Morelos:
  - Graco Ramírez PRD, until October 1
  - Cuauhtémoc Blanco, PSD, starting October 1
- Nayarit: Antonio Echevarría García PAN
- Nuevo León
  - Manuel Florentino González Flores, Interim governor PRI, January 1 to July 2 (Note: Jaime Rodríguez Calderón (El Bronco") took a leave of absence in 2018 to run for President as the first independent candidate in history.)
  - Jaime Rodríguez Calderón (El Bronco"), Independent, starting July 2
- Oaxaca: Alejandro Murat Hinojosa PRI
- Puebla:
  - José Antonio Gali Fayad PAN, until December 13, 2018
  - Martha Érika Alonso PAN, December 14 – December 24 (died in office)
  - Jesús Rodríguez Almeida PAN, Interim governor starting December 24
- Querétaro: Francisco Domínguez Servién PAN
- Quintana Roo: Carlos Joaquín González PAN
- San Luis Potosí: Juan Manuel Carreras PRI
- Sinaloa: Quirino Ordaz Coppel PRI
- Sonora: Claudia Pavlovich Arellano PRI
- Tabasco: Arturo Núñez Jiménez, until December 31
- Tamaulipas: Francisco Javier García Cabeza de Vaca PAN
- Tlaxcala: Marco Antonio Mena Rodríguez PRI
- Veracruz:
  - Miguel Ángel Yunes, until November 30
  - Cuitláhuac García Jiménez, starting December 1
- Yucatán:
  - Rolando Zapata Bello, until September 30
  - Mauricio Vila Dosal PAN, starting October 1
- Zacatecas: Alejandro Tello Cristerna PRI

== Events ==
=== January through March ===
- January 23 — Marco Antonio Sanchez Flores, a student at Prepa 8 in Mexico City, is detained by the Secretaria de Seguridad Publica and the Policia Auxiliar. Several hours later, he was released in Melchor Ocampo, State of Mexico. Months later, the detention is unexplained.
- February 16 — A helicopter of the SEDENA crashes, leaving 14 dead. The helicopter, which was carrying the Secretary of the Interior, Alfonso Navarrete Prida and the Governor of Oaxaca, Alejandro Murat, crashed in Santiago Jamiltepec, Oaxaca, as it was inspecting the damage caused by an earthquake with a magnitude of 7.2 that had taken place at 5:39 p.m.
- February 18 – Five minors are killed and three are injured when their car crashes on Eje 10 Sur in Mexico City. They had visited a fair in Santa Catarina Yecahuízotl, Tláhuac.
- March 19: Three film students from the Universidad de Medios Audiovisuales (CAAV), Javier Salomón Aceves Gastélum, Daniel Díaz y Marcos Ávalos, disappeared in Tonalá, Jalisco. Later it was discovered that the students were beaten and killed, and their bodies were dissolved in acid.
- March 20 – A man walks into a store in "Reforma 222" shopping mall in Mexico City, shoots his ex-wife, and causes panic among the shoppers.
- March 30 – Campaigning for the 2018 Mexican general election begins.

=== April through June ===
- April 5 — U.S. President Donald Trump threatens to militarize its southern border.
- April 10 – Despite not having sufficient signatures, Jaime Rodríguez Calderón "El Bronco" is allowed to run for President as an independent candidate.
- April 11 – After two weeks, a capuchin monkey is captured and taken to Chapultepec Zoo.
- April 22 – First Presidential debate, in Mexico City is watched by 11.4 million people.
- May 8 – A crack in the high-speed lane of Viaducto Miguel Alemán in Iztacalco, Mexico City, frightens motorists. It requires 1,100 m^{3} of concrete to be repaired.
- May 16 – Margarita Zavala, the only female candidate for President, drops out.
- May 18 — An airplane crash in Cuba results in the deaths of 112 people, including the seven members of the crew, all Mexicans.
- May 20 – Second Presidential debate, in Tijuana, Baja California
- June
  - Floods cause multiple problems throughout the country, particularly in Mexico City, Guadalajara, and Guanajuato.
  - Two dismembered bodies, presumably belonging to drug traffickers, are found on Avenida Insurgentes Norte y Flores Magón in Nonoalco Tlatelolco, Mexico City.

=== July through September ===
- July 1 — Andrés Manuel López Obrador wins the presidency.
- July 12
  - A shopping center in Álvaro Obregón, Mexico City partially collapses. No one is hurt, and it reopens 40 days later.
  - Third Presidential debate, in Mérida, Yucatán.
- August 7 – Elba Esther Gordillo Morales is cleared of charges of money laundering and organized crime membership, after spending five years in prison.
- August 8 – Roberto Moyado Esparza, a.k.a. ‘El Betito’, presumed leader of La Unión de Tepito drug gang, is arrested.
- August 17 — The government issues a new MXN $500 bill, featuring Benito Juarez.
- September 4 — A group of pseudo-students known as porros attack a peaceful march by students from the Colegio de Ciencias y Humanidades (CCH) Azcapotzalco, Universidad Nacional Autónoma de México (UNAM), who were demanding greater security measures on campus. Several students are injured.
- September 15 – Peña Nieto leads the Independence Day Celebration for the last time.

=== October through December ===
- October 2 – 50th anniversary of the Tlatelolco massacre.
- October 11 - The collapse of a shopping mall under construction in the Mexican city of Monterrey results in at least 7 deaths and nine people missing. 15 others are injured.
- October 19
  - A caravan of migrants from Central America begins a trek across Mexico in defiance of Donald Trump's anti-immigrant rhetoric. A fence separating Guatemala and Ciudad Hidalgo, Chiapas is torn down.
  - 'El Calavera' is arrested for sexually abusing 39 children in the "Marcelino de Champagnat" preschool in Mexico City.
- October 31 — Repairs to the water system in Mexico City and the State of Mexico leave millions without water for a week.
- November 5 — The trial of Joaquín "El Chapo" Loera Guzman begins in New York, accused of drug trafficking.
- December 1 — President Andrés Manuel López Obrador is inaugurated.
- December 15 — At 18:57 local time, Popocatepetl spews lava, ash and rock.
- December 24 — The governor of Puebla, Martha Erika Alonso and her husband, Rafael Moreno Valle Rosas, a senator and former state governor, die in a helicopter crash.
- December 28 – Seven minor children burn to death in a fire in their home in Buenavista, Iztapalapa, Mexico City.

== Holidays, festivities, and special events ==
- January 1 – New Year's Day, statutory holiday
- January 6 – Feast of the Epiphany
- February 2 – Feast of Candlemas
- February 5 – Constitution Day, statutory holiday
- February 14
  - Day of Love and Friendship
  - Ash Wednesday
- February 20 – Mexican Army Day, civic holiday
- February 24 – Flag Day, civic holiday
- March 8 – International Women's Day
- March 18 – Anniversary of the Mexican oil expropriation, civic holiday
- March 19 – Benito Juárez's Birthday, statutory holiday
- March 20 – March equinox
- March 25 to 30 – Holy Week
- March 29 – Holy Thursday
- March 30 – Good Friday
- April 21 – Heroic Defense of Veracruz, civic holiday
- April 30 – Children's Day
- May 1 – Labour Day, statutory holiday
- May 5 – Cinco de Mayo, civic holiday
- May 8 – Miguel Hidalgo y Costilla's Birthday, civic holiday
- May 10 – Mother's Day
- May 15 – Teachers' Day
- May 23 – Students' Day
- June 1 – Mexican Navy Day, civic holiday
- June 17 – Father's Day
- June 21 – June solstice
- July 1 – 2018 Mexican general election
- September 13 – Anniversary of the "Heroic Cadets", civic holiday
- September 15 – Cry of Dolores, civic holiday
- September 16 – Independence Day, statutory holiday
- September 30 – José María Morelos's Birthday, civic holiday
- October 12 – Day of the Race, civic holiday
- November 1 – All Saints' Day
- November 2 – Day of the Dead
- November 19 – Revolution Day, statutory holiday
- December 1 – Presidential Inauguration Day
- December 12 – Feast of Our Lady of Guadalupe
- December 16 to 24 – Las Posadas
- December 21 – December solstice
- December 24 – Christmas Eve
- December 25 – Christmas Day, statutory holiday

== Awards ==
- Belisario Domínguez Medal of Honor – Carlos Páyan
- Order of the Aztec Eagle
  - Pratibha Devisingh Patil, former President of India
  - Jared Kushner, U.S. beneficiary of nepotism
- National Prize for Arts and Sciences
  - Linguistics and literature – Angelina Muñiz-Huberman
  - Physics, Mathematics, and Natural Sciences – Carlos Alberto Aguilar Salinas and Mónica Alicia Clapp Jiménez Labora
  - Technology and Design – Ricardo Chicurel Uziel and Leticia Myriam Torres Guerra
  - Popular Arts and Traditions – Leonor Farlow Espinoza
  - Fine arts – Ricardo Chicurel Uziel and Leticia Myriam Torres Guerra
- National Public Administration Prize
- Ohtli Award
  - Sarahi Espinoza Salamanca
  - Joseph I. Castro

== Deaths ==
=== January ===
- January 1
  - Santiago Elias Castro Escobedo, former mayor of Piedras Negras, Coahuila; heart attack.
  - Carlos Tirado Montero, 70, businessperson and politician (b. 1947).
- January 5
  - Glafiro Alanís Flores, 73, biologist and educator (author of El valor de nuestras plantas, and Flora nativa ornamental para Monterrey); illness (b. 1944).
  - Isauro Medina Hinojos, 95, businessperson and former mayor of Parral, Chihuahua (b. 1922).
- January 6
  - Rubén Amaro Rodarte, 81, businessperson (b. 1936).
  - Jose Gerardo Martinea, 35, journalist (El Universal; murdered during robbery.
  - Enrique Caballero Vela, 65, actor; lumbar cáncer (b. 1952).
  - Salvador Reyes Montellano, journalist.
- January 7: Roberto López y Garza ("Bob Logar"), 82, journalist and publicicist; heart attack (b. 1936).
- January 8
  - Salvador Borrego, 102, pro-Nazi journalist and writer (b. 1915).
  - Francisco McManus Soto, educator and environmentalist ("Radio Ecologica").
- Joel Alanís (47), rock músician; sclerosis.
- January 10: Eugenio Ramírez (60), polítician from Guerrero; heart attack.
- January 12: Hugo Betancourt Morales (59), dancer and art director (b. 1958).
- January 13: Carlos Domínguez, independent journalist ("Diario de Nuevo Laredo"); murdered.
- January 16: Rogelio Benavides Chapa, 77, former mayor of Guadalupe, Nuevo León; complications from surgery.
- January 17: Rafael Villegas Attolini, 72, businessperson and former mayor of Gómez Palacio Municipality.
- January 19: Andrés Marcelo Sada Zambrano (87), engineer and businessperson ("Grupo Cydsa").
- January 21: Rafael Anaya González, rector of Universidad Don Vasco.
- January 22: Rogelio Padilla, 62, sociologist, activist for children's rights, founder of MAMA, A.C. (b. 1955)
- January 24: Ramón "Diablo" Montoya Lerma (78), baseball center-fielder (Diablos Rojos) and member of Hall of Fame (b. 1940).
- January 25: Sahori (María Jovita Ramírez Zamora), Mexican wrestler; cáncer.
- January 26
  - Ramiro Cota, 91, former mayor of Chihuahua Municipality, Chihuahua (1980-1983, PRI).
  - Francisco Savín, 88, composer and director Xalapa Symphony Orchestra (1963-1967); (b. 1929).
- January 27
  - Graciela Bernardo, actress.
  - Manuel Cevallos Urueta, 73, notary public and former mayor of Querétaro City, Querétaro.
- January 28: Salvador Aguilar García, mayor of Cohetzala, Puebla; auto accident.

=== February ===
- February 1
  - Gonzalo Aguilar Zinser, lawyer and social activist; heart attack.
  - Rumaldo Velázquez Quiñónez (56), politician and Yaqui Indigenous leader; diabetes.
- February 2: María Alicia Martínez Medrano (76), cultural promoter (Momentos Sagrados de los Mayas).
- February 3
  - Félix Hernández López (50), journalist; automobile accident.
  - Luis Santiago Catarina, academic, politician (PRD), social activist; heart attack.
  - Felipe Valdez Licea, politician and farm leader in Amealco de Bonfil, Queretaro.
- February 5: Francisco Rojas San Román, 59, polítician (PRI), federal Deputy (2009-2012); murdered (b. 1958).
- February 9
  - Javier Manuel Hernandez Ramirez, laborer, movie actor.
  - Agustín Sánchez Altamirano (75), writer and novillero (bullfighter) (b. 1942).
- February 10
  - Eduardo Arce Becerra, coach and sports promoter; heart attack.
  - Nohemi Hermosillo, model ("Capitol's Model") and businessperson; auto accident.
- February 11: Pablo Garza Lugo, politician (PRI) and businessperson; auto accident.
- February 12: Evaristo Gómez Hernández (78), polítician and union leader (National Educational Workers Union, SNTE); heart attack (b. 1939).
- February 13
  - Dante Bucio, photojournalist (Excélsior) and academic.
  - Carmela Rey (86), actress and singer; heart attack (b. 1931).
- February 16:
  - Jorge Hernández Andrés (64), businessperson and rejoneador (bullfighter); suicide (b. 1954).
  - Guillermo Zambrano Lozano (87), businessperson (Metalsa); lung infection.
- February 17: "Don Sshinda" (Gumercindo España Olivares), 83, wooden toy handicrafter (b. 1935).
- February 18: Tadeusz Kępka (85), Polish track coach, nationalized Mexican; home accident (b. 1932).
- February 19
  - Rafael Castro Torres (93), businessperson (b. 1924).
  - Leopoldo Corona, lawyer and boxer.
- February 20: Soledad Ricarte Bravo, journalist (XEU Noticias).
- February 21: José Luis Ibarra (72), baseball player (Tigres de Quintana Roo); diabetes.
- February 23: Magdalena Pueblito Espinosa Rodríguez, polítician from Queretaro; cáncer.
- February 24
  - Claudia Reyes (46), teacher (b. 1971).
  - Carlos Armando Torres Lagarda, lawyer and academic.
- February 25
  - Manuel Granados Enríquez (82), businessperson and former mayor of Valle de Santiago, Queretaro.
  - Teresita Saad, actress ("Como dice el dicho”, “El diez”, “Código Postal” and “La Rosa de Guadalupe”).
- February 27: Tomás Morales (85), journalist and baseball sportscaster (b. 1932).
- February 28
  - Rogelio Guerra, 81, actor.
  - Jorge Rubén Nordhausen González (67), polítician (Senator, PAN); stroke (b. 1950).

=== March ===
- March 1
  - Enrique Cárdenas González, 91, Mexican politician, Governor of Tamaulipas (1975–1981), Municipal President of Ciudad Victoria, and Senator (1968–1971).
  - Maria Rubio, 83, actress (Cuna de lobos, Imperio de cristal, Querida enemiga).
- March 2: Adela Calva Reyes (50), Otomi writer (Ra hua ra hiä / Alas a la palabra and Maga pädihu te’ä ra b’edi ra nanoteknología / Vamos a conocer la nanotecnología) (b. 1967).
- March 3: Aarón Vargas Contreras, political scientist and chronicler of Papantla, Veracruz.
- March 4
  - Cuauhtémoc García Pineda (El Matador), photographer and journalist who filmed the Tlatelolco massacre in 1968.
  - Ricardo Ponce Espejo (50), Yucatan businessperson.
- March 5
  - Catalina Eibenschutz Hartman, physician, researcher, and académic; cofouner of the Medicina Social y la Salud Colectiva en México y América Latina.
  - Marcela Lombardo Otero (92), politician, Deputy (1976–1979, 1988–1991), presidential candidate (1994-PPS).
- March 6
  - Octavio Novaro, 78, Mexican physicist specialized in theoretical catalysis, awarded the National Prize for Arts and Sciences (1983) and UNESCO Science Prize (1993).
  - Benito Rosel Isaac (79), Yucatan politician (PAN) (b. 1939).78
- March 7: Ricardo Espinosa Cárdenas (79), writer, actor, theater director, television presenter
- March 8
  - Samuel 'Tuxpan' González (72), soccer player for Tiburones Rojos de Veracruz; heart attack.
  - Arcelia Larrañaga (77), actress.
  - Rafael 'Cobra' Mendoza (80), boxing promototer and representative (Vicente Saldívar, Daniel Zaragoza, Pipino Cuevas) (b. 1937).
- March 11
  - Gabriel Berumen Castillo (80), photographer (El Heraldo de Saltillo).
  - Misael Meneses Carmona (19), 3rd division soccer player in Puebla; drowning.
- March 12: Daniela Magdaleno (23), bullfighting photographer; brain aneurism (b. 1995).
- March 14: Carlos Aurelio González Villarreal (87), physician and composer ("Ojos cafés") (b. 1930).
- March 16
  - Ezequiel Orozco, 29, Mexican soccer player (Murciélagos F.C.), lung cancer.
  - Sergio Chávez Saldaña (88), Chihuahua surgeon and teacher (b. Oct 17, 1929).
- March 18: Sergio García (78), Monterrey theater director; pneumonia and brain surgery complications (b. 1940).
- March 19: Adriana Cortés Mercado, journalist and communicator ("Radar News"); cáncer.
- March 21: Saúl Montoya Beltrán (66), baseball player; heart attack (b. 1951).
- March 22:
  - Jaime Puga, actor and singer.
  - Adela Peralta Leppe (88), actress, first female clown in Mexico (b. 1929).
  - América Rodríguez Camacho, Mezquitic, Jalisco polítician (PAN); stroke.
  - Maximino Alberto Wood Hernández, Coatzacoalcos lawyer and politician (PAN).
- March 25: Jacinto Adriano Wong Romero (99), Progreso, Yucatán priest (b. 1918).
- March 27: Eva Izaguirre Camacho, first female mayor of Poza Rica, Veracruz (PRI: 1992-1994); cáncer.
- March 28
  - Ernesto Salinas Flores (89), businessperson from Piedras Negras, Coahuila; lymphoma.
  - Elena Subirats (70), tennis player, medalist in 1963 and 1967 Pan American Games; natural causes (b. 1947).
- March 29: Alan Durbecq Anton, cellist; autombolile accident.

=== April ===
- April 3: Tomas Villa, 34, featherweight boxer, traffic collision.
- April 5: Erberto Shinagawa Montoya (88), journalist ("La Voz de Sinaloa", "El Sol de Sinaloa"), chronicler, and historian (b. Jan 26, 1930).
- April 6: Urbano Zea, 49, Mexican swimmer, heart attack.
- April 8: Rito Valdés Salinas (86), former mayor of Piedras Negras (1990-1993); long-time illness.
- April 9
  - Claudia Chablé Ek, journalist; cáncer.
  - Felipe Tejeda García, 83, Mexican Roman Catholic prelate, Auxiliary Bishop of México (2000–2010) (b. Jan. 21, 1935).
- April 10
  - Alejandro Hernández (74), journalist (Aguascalientes TV and Heraldo de Aguascalientes); heart attack.
  - Emilia Martell, actress and singer; suicide.
- April 11:
  - Rafael Villegas Attolini, businessperson and politician.
  - Alfonso Zaragoza Moreno (85), Culiacán businessperson (b. March 24, 1933).
- April 12: Sergio Pitol, 85, writer (El mago de Viena), translator, and diplomat; complications of progressive aphasia (b. March 18, 1933).
- April 13
  - Manuel Hernández Salomón (82), chronicler and writer.
  - Joy Laville, Mexican painter and sculptor born in the U.K.; stroke (b. 1923).
- April 14: Armando Salgado (79), photojournalist who filmed the killing of 120 students in the Corpus Christi massacre in 1971 (b. 1938).
- April 16: Sendy Arlet Guerrero Montejo, journalist; bone cancer.
- April 17: Martha Meza, journalist (El Diario de Xalapa); cáncer.
- April 18: Rubén Díaz Alcántara (50), priest, murdered (b. 1968).
- April 19: Graciela Agudelo, 72, Mexican pianist and composer (Premio Xochipilli—INBA, 2002).
- April 21
  - Jesús Ramírez Elisea (87), businessperson (Hotel Fiesta Mexicana).
  - Ignacio Solorio Arroyo (65), lawyer (director of "El Vigia"); heart attack.
- April 22: María Loreto Elba Rojas Bruschetta (68), lawyer and judge in Puebla; illness related to tobacco (b. 1950).
- April 25: Gregorio Casal, 82, actor (La Choca); dehydration.
- April 26: Armando Contreras González, journalist, reporter, television host (TV Azteca); cáncer.
- April 27
  - Guillermo Aldrett (43), businessperson ("Industriales Potosinos A.C."); automobile accident.
  - Juan Carlos Olivas, 34, actor ("El Güero" in "El Chapo (TV series)"); cáncer (b. 1984).
- April 28: As Charro (69), professional wrestler.

=== May ===
- May 1: Wrestler Universo 2000 (Andrés Reyes), 55, heart attack in León, Guanajuato.
- May 3
  - Feliciano Guirado Méndez (77), journalist.
  - Federico Terrazas Torres (85), businessperson (Cementos de Chihuahua).
- May 7: Jesús Kumate Rodríguez (93), pediatritian, polítician, and Secretary of Health (1988-1994) (b. Nov. 12, 1924).
- May 8
  - Ana Marisa Lugo Miranda (55), publicity person.
  - Felipe Muñoz Barba (54), polítician; diabetes (b. 1964).
- May 10: Mexican actor Fela Fabregas died at 87 due to a cardio-pulmonary illness (b. 1930).
- May 14: María Elena Meneses Rocha, 56, Mexican journalist, technologist and academic (Monterrey Institute of Technology and Higher Education).
- May 11
  - José Remedios Aguirre Sánchez, polítician; murdered.
  - Nicanor Moreira Ruiz, businessperson and politician.
- May 14: José Manuel García Arreola, social activist; cáncer.
- May 15 José Lavat, 69, Mexican voice actor, renal failure.
- May 16: Alejandro Caballero Vértiz, lawyer and judge.
- May 17: Hernán de Mata Quinta, Oaxaca politician (PT); murdered.
- May 19: Carlos Ximénez Estrada (81), cultural journalist and writer.
- May 20: Jacinto Contreras Martínez (89), polítician (b. 1928).
- May 23: Adrián Páez Martínez, businessperson (Comercial America).
- May 29
  - Arturo Antonio Szymanski Ramírez, 96, first archbishop of San Luis Potosí.
  - René Yañez, 75, Mexican-born American artist, founder of Galería de la Raza, cancer.

=== June ===
- June 3: Héctor Miranda (57), voice actor (b. 1961).
- June 5: Mauricio Caro (42), actor.
- June 7: Fernando Purón Johnston (43), polítician; murdered (b. 1975).
- June 11: Martín Luna (50), television producer (TV Azteca).
- June 13: Arkangel de la Muerte, 52, Mexican professional wrestler (CMLL), heart attack.
- June 25: Jaime Bermúdez Cuarón (94), polítician and businessperson (b. 1923).
- June 29: María Luisa Mendoza, 88, Mexican journalist, novelist and politician.

=== July ===
- July 5: Trinidad Martínez Tarragó (89), Spanish-born economist, writer, and académic (b. 1928).
- July 6: Antonio Toledo Corro, Governor of Sinaloa 1981–1986 (b. 1919)
- July 8: Piratita Morgan, 49, professional wrestler.
- July 11: Television producer Santiago Galindo was murdered in his car in Alvaro Obregon, Mexico City. Another report is that he committed suicide.
- July 19: Wrestler Maximino "Max" Linares Moreno, a.k.a. Rayo de Jalisco died of natural causes at the age of 85 in Mexico City.
- July 24: Rubén Pat, Quintana Roo journalist and reporter; murdered.
- July 26: Alfredo del Águila (83), soccer player (b. 1935).
- July 30: Claudia Heinze, model; heart failure.
- July 31: Rafael Amador, 58, soccer player (Pumas UNAM and national team) and coach (Pumas UNAM).

=== August ===
- August 2: Gabriel Covarrubias Ibarra, 88, politician, Senator (1997–2000), Mayor of Guadalajara (1989–1992).
- August 13: Rico Pontvianne, 74, basketball player, Pan American championship silver medalist (1967).
- August 15: Musician Fabio Melanitto was murdered while riding his motorcycle in Colonia Navarette, Mexico City. He was 32.
- August 18: Gabriel López Zapiain, 75, soccer player (Irapuato, Guadalajara, national team).
- August 21: Villano III (Arturo Díaz Mendoza), 66, professional wrestler (UWA, CMLL, AAA), cerebral infarction.
- August 26: Federico Barbosa Gutiérrez, 66, Mexican jurist and politician, member of the Congress of the Union (2003–2006), heart attack.
- August 31: José Luis Dibildox Martínez, 75, bishop of the Roman Catholic Dioceses of Tarahumara (1993–2003) and Tampico (2003–2018); long-time illness (b. 1943)

=== September ===
- September 5
  - Roger Aguilar Salazar 79, Mexican politician, deputy-elect for Moreno from Yucatan, died of leukemia (b. 1938)
  - José Antonio Fernández Salazar (62), journalist Televisa; cáncer.
- September 6: Ernesto Juárez Frías (87), músician and composer (b. 1931).
- September 9: Javier Usabiaga Arroyo, 79, Mexican politician, Minister of Agriculture (2000–2005) and Deputy (2009–2012); cancer (b. 1939).
- September 27: Virginia Ramos, 65, Mexican-born American chef.

=== October ===
- October 4: José Sacal (63) writer (b. 1955).
- October 5: Yolanda Martínez actress
- October 12: Marbella Ibarra, soccer coach and promoter of women's soccer (b. 1972); murdered.
- October 17: Elizabeth Nava Hernández 55, politician Morena; cancer (b. 1963)
- October 19: Martha Beatriz Isela Fregoso Zepeda (51), journalist (Excélsior) and executive (b. 1967).
- October 26: César Zambrano Pérez, polítician (Acapulco) and businessperson; murdered.
- October 31: Arnulfo "Fito" Avilán Cruz 94, soccer player (Rayados).

=== November ===
- November 1: Manuel Villamor Reyes 90, Mexican-Belizean painter and muralist (b. 1928)
- November 4:
  - Melquiades Sánchez Orozco (90), journalist and radio announcer (b. 1928).
  - Sofía Tejeda Becerra (82), actress (b. 1936).
- November 6: José Lothario, 83, Mexican professional wrestler and manager (NWA, WWF, CWF).
- November 7: José Fortunato Álvarez Valdez 50, Catholic bishop of Gomez Palacio, Durango died after a long illness (b. 1967).
- November 11
  - Pedro Aranda-Díaz Muñoz, 85, Mexican Roman Catholic prelate, Archbishop of Tulancingo (1975–2008).
  - Olga Harmony, 90, Mexican playwright.
- November 14:
  - Chilean singer of boleros Lucho Gatica, a long-time resident of Mexico, died at the age of 90.
  - Mexican writer Fernando del Paso died at the age of 85 in his home in Mexico City.
- November 18: Héctor Beltrán Leyva 53, Mexican drug lord, died of a heart attack (b. 1965)
- November 19: Isidro Olace (83), actor (b. 1935).
- November 20: Lorena Villegas, voice actress.
- November 21: Luis Trujillo Llame (32), Catholic priest; accident (b. 1986)
- November 26: Patricia Quintana, 72, Mexican chef, writer and academic; natural causes.
- November 27: Benjamín Gallegos Soto 58, Mexican pilot and politician, member of PAN, Senator from Aguascalientes (b. 1960)

=== December ===
- December 5: Carlos “Bobby” Treviño, 70, baseball player (California Angels); sudden death (b. 1948).
- December 14: Salvador Flores Huerta, 84, Mexican Roman Catholic prelate, Bishop of Ciudad Lázaro Cárdenas (1993–2006).
- December 16: Juan L. Maldonado, 70, Mexican-born American education administrator, President of Laredo Community College (2007–2016).
- December 18: Ángeles Bravo (73) Spanish-Mexican doubling actress (b. 1945)
- December 19: Raúl Mata, 71, Mexican professional wrestler (EMLL, CWF, NWA Hollywood).
- December 22: Angélica García Arrieta (64), Mexican accountant and politician, founder of Morena (b. 1958)
- December 24: The governor of Puebla, Martha Erika Alonso (b. 1973) and her husband, senator and former governor Rafael Moreno Valle Rosas died in a helicopter crash.
- December 27
  - Lourdes Deschamps (68), actress and producer (b. 1950).
  - Martha Elena Venier (80), professor and researcher (b. 1938).
- December 29: Rosenda Monteros (83), actress, director, and producer (b. 1935).

=== Date unknown ===
- Agustín Bernal, actor.
- Teresa Saad, actress.
