= 1927 in Mexico =

- Decades: 1900s; 1910s; 1920s; 1930s; 1940s
- See also: History of Mexico; List of years in Mexico; Timeline of Mexican history

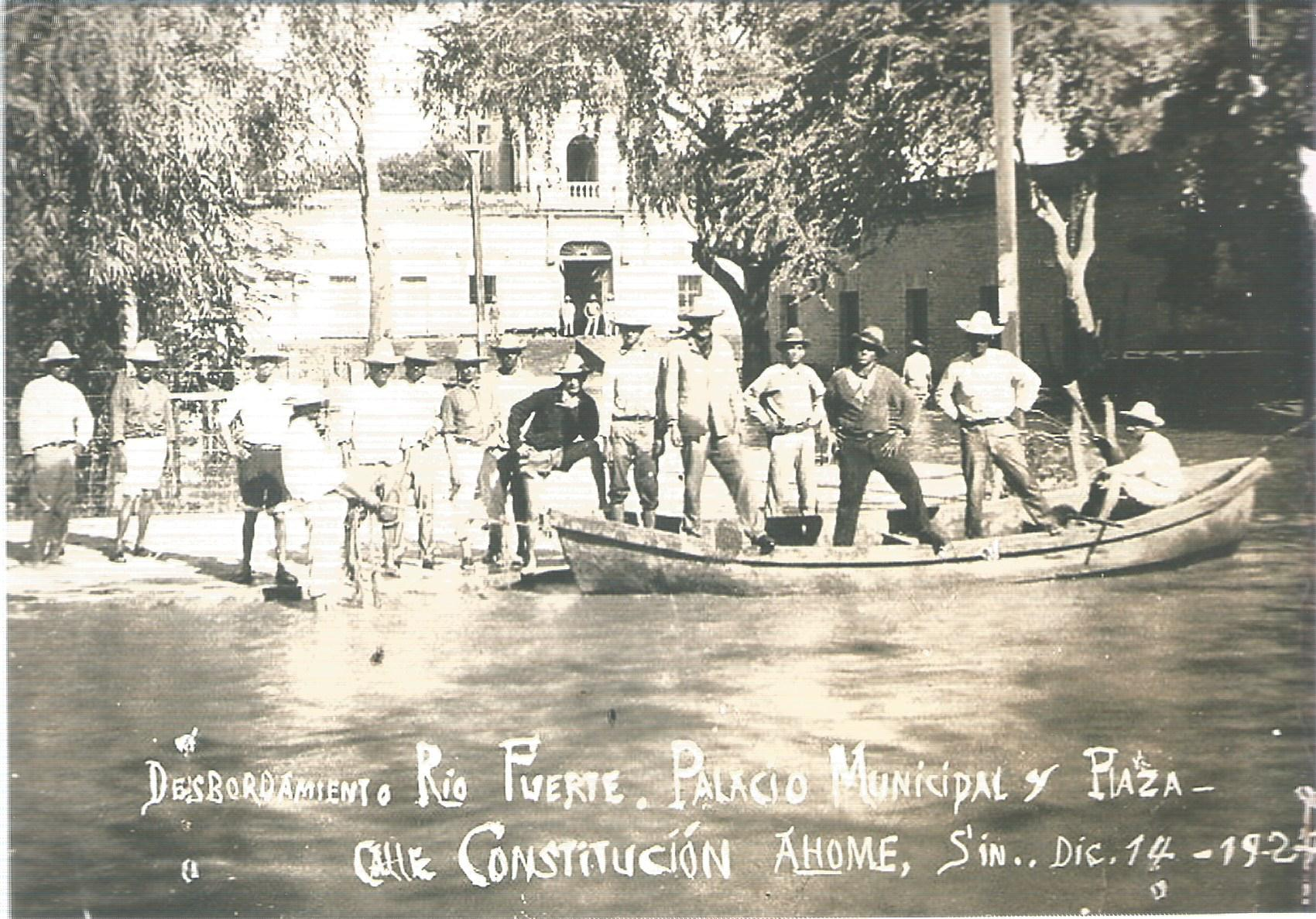
Overflow of the Río Fuerte in 1927

Events from the year 1927 in Mexico.

== Incumbents ==
=== Federal government ===
- President: Plutarco Elías Calles

=== Governors ===
- Aguascalientes: Isaac Díaz de León
- Campeche: Ángel Castillo Lanz/Silvestre Pavón Silva
- Chiapas: Luis P. Vidal/Federico Martínez Rojas
- Chihuahua: Jesús Antonio Almeida/Manuel Mascareñas/Fernando Orozco
- Coahuila: Manuel Pérez Treviño
- Colima: Laureano Cervantes
- Durango:
- Guanajuato: Agustín Arroyo
- Guerrero: Héctor F. López
- Hidalgo: Matías Rodríguez
- Jalisco: Enrique Cuervo/Daniel R. Benítez/Margarito Ramírez
- State of Mexico: Carlos Riva Palacio
- Michoacán: : Enrique Ramírez Aviña
- Morelos: Ambrosio Puente
- Nayarit: José de la Peña Ledón
- Nuevo León: José Benítez
- Oaxaca: Genaro V. Vázquez
- Puebla: Donato Bravo Izquierdo
- Querétaro: Abraham Araujo
- San Luis Potosí: Saturnino Cedillo
- Sinaloa: vacant
- Sonora: Fausto Topete
- Tabasco: Tomás Taracena Hernández
- Tamaulipas: Juan Rincón
- Tlaxcala: Ignacio Mendoza
- Veracruz: Abel S. Rodríguez
- Yucatán: Álvaro Torre Díaz
- Zacatecas: Fernando Rodarte

== Events ==
- January 1 – Cristero War: Rebellion begins with a manifesto issued by René Capistrán Garza.
- Sara García makes her only screen appearance between 1918 and 1933, as an extra in Yo soy tu padre.

== Births ==
- January 1 – Raúl Valerio, actor (d. 2017)
- February 3 – Sarah Jiménez, engraving artist, member of the Salón de la Plástica Mexicana; (d. 2017)
- February 4 — Enrique Cárdenas González, politician (PRI), Governor of Tamaulipas (1975-1981) (d. 2018).
- August 27 – Adolfo Mexiac, graphic artist (d. 2019).
- August 28 — Claudio Brook, actor, winner of two Ariel Awards (d. 1995).
- September 15 – Ricardo Miledi, neuro-scientist (Academia Mexicana de Ciencias y de la Academia Nacional de Medicina de México) (d. 2017).
- October 26 – Fernando Gutiérrez Barrios, politician (d. 2000)
- October 28 – Rafael Gallardo García, bishop of Roman Catholic Diocese of Linares (1974-1987) and Roman Catholic Diocese of Tampico (1987-2003), d. January 30, 2021
- November 27 – Sergio Bravo, footballer

== Deaths ==
- January 17 – Jenaro Sánchez Delgadillo, Catholic priest (born 1886; executed by the Mexican military during the Cristero War)
- February 6 – Mateo Correa Magallanes, Catholic priest (born 1866; executed).
- April 1 – José Dionisio Luis Padilla Gómez, priest (born 1899; executed)
- April 21 – Román Adame Rosales (born 1859; executed)
- April 27 – Anacleto González Flores, lawyer (born 1888; executed)
- May 25 – Cristóbal Magallanes Jara (born 1869; executed) and Agustín Caloca Cortés (born 1898; Catholic priests, executed)
- June 26 – José María Robles Hurtado, Catholic priest (born 1888; executed)
- August 7 – Miguel de la Mora de la Mora, Catholic priest (executed)
- October 28 – Rodrigo Aguilar Alemán, Catholic priest (executed)
- November 13 – Miguel Pro, Catholic priest (executed)
