= 1924 in Mexico =

- Decades: 1900s; 1910s; 1920s; 1930s; 1940s
- See also: History of Mexico; List of years in Mexico; Timeline of Mexican history

The following lists events that happened in 1924 in Mexico.

== Incumbents ==
=== Federal government ===
- President: Álvaro Obregón (until 30 November); Plutarco Elías Calles (from 1 December)
- Interior Secretary (SEGOB): Romeo Ortega
- Secretary of Foreign Affairs (SRE): Aarón Sáenz Garza
- Communications Secretary (SCT):
- Education Secretary (SEP):

=== Supreme Court ===
- President of the Supreme Court:

=== Governors ===
- Aguascalientes: Victorino Medina
- Campeche: Ángel Castillo Lanz
- Chiapas: Rogelio García Castro
- Chihuahua: Vicente N. Mendoza
- Coahuila: Carlos Garza Castro
- Colima: Gerardo Hurtado Sánchez
- Guanajuato: Jesús S. Soto (interim), Arturo Sierra (interim)
- Guerrero: Francisco Figueroa Mata
- Jalisco: José Guadalupe Zuno
- State of Mexico: Abundio Gómez
- Michoacán: Sidronio Sánchez Pineda then Enrique Ramírez Aviña
- Morelos: Alfredo Ortega; Amilcar Magaña; Ismael Velazco
- Nayarit: Pascual Villanueva Paredes
- Nuevo León:
- Oaxaca: Manuel García Vigil
- Puebla:
- Querétaro: Julián Malo Juvera
- San Luis Potosí: Aurelio Manrique De Lara
- Sinaloa: Ángel Flores
- Sonora: Alejo Bay
- Tabasco: Tomás Garrido Canabal
- Tamaulipas: Benecio López Padilla/Pelayo Quintana/Candelario Garza/Gregorio Garza Salinas
- Veracruz: Adalberto Tejeda Olivares (until November 30); Heriberto Jara Corona (from December 1)
- Yucatán: Felipe Carrillo Puerto/José María Iturralde Traconis
- Zacatecas: Felipe Carrillo Puerto/Juan Ricárdez Broca/Miguel Cantón (acting)/José María Iturralde Traconis

== Events ==
- The federal government reports that troops loyal to President Álvaro Obregón have defeated rebels led by Adolfo de la Huerta near Zacualpan.
- February 5 – Anti-government rebels retreat from Veracruz when federal troops are victorious at Córdoba.
- February 7 – Former president and rebel leader Adolfo de la Huerta escapes by boat to Mérida, Yucatán, after federal troops recapture Veracruz.
- February 10 – Federal troops decisively defeat rebels at Ocotlán.
- February 15 – Grupo Sonido 13, directed by Julián Carrillo, holds the first concert of microtonal music in Mexico City.
- February 24 – Federal troops defeat rebels in the oil region of Tamaulipas.
- Land belonging to Mexican President-elect Plutarco Elías Calles is expropriated in accordance with agrarian laws.

== Births ==
- January 16 – Katy Jurado, actress (died 2002)
- February 29 – Agustín Hernández Navarro, architect and sculptor (died 2022)
- March 13 — Raúl Córdoba, international footballer (died 2017)
- June 26 – Juan Gómez, footballer (died 2009)
- November 13 — Jesús Kumate Rodríguez, physician and politician (died 2018)

== Deaths ==
- January 3 — Felipe Carrillo Puerto, journalist, politician and revolutionary (born 1874)
- June 10 — Salvador Alvarado, politician and soldier (born 1880)
