= 1928 in Mexico =

- Decades: 1900s; 1910s; 1920s; 1930s; 1940s
- See also: History of Mexico; List of years in Mexico; Timeline of Mexican history

Events from the year 1928 in Mexico

== Incumbents ==
=== Federal government ===
- President:
  - Plutarco Elías Calles (until November 30)
  - Emilio Portes Gil (starting December 1)
- Interior Secretary (SEGOB): Adalberto Tejeda then Gonzalo Vázquez Vela then Emilio Portes Gil then Felipe Canales
- Secretary of Foreign Affairs (SRE):
- Communications Secretary (SCT): Ramón Ross then Javier Sánchez Mejorada
- Education Secretary (SEP): José Manuel Puig Casauranc then Moisés Sáenz then Ezequiel Padilla

=== Supreme Court ===
- President of the Supreme Court:

=== Governors ===
- Aguascalientes: Isaac Díaz de León (1926-1928), Alberto Díaz de León Bocanegra (1928), Benjamín de la Mora (1928), Manuel Carpio Velázquez (1928-1929)
- Campeche: Silvestre Pavón Silva (1927-1928), Pedro Tello Andueza (1928), Ramiro Bojórquez Castillo (1928-1931)
- Chiapas: Federico Martínez Rojas (1927–1928), Amador Coutiño (1928), Rosendo Delabre Santeliz (1928), Raymundo E. Enríquez (1928-1929)
- Chihuahua: Fernando Orozco (1927-1928), Marcelo Caraveo (1928-1929)
- Coahuila: Manuel Pérez Treviño
- Colima: Laureano Cervantes
- Durango:
- Guanajuato: Agustín Arroyo
- Guerrero: Héctor F. López (1925–1928), Enrique Martínez (1928), Adrián Castrejón National Revolutionary Party (1928–1933)
- Hidalgo: Matías Rodríguez
- Jalisco: Margarito Ramírez
- State of Mexico: Carlos Riva Palacio
- Michoacán: : Enrique Ramírez Aviña (1924–1928), Lázaro Cárdenas (1928–1929)
- Morelos: Ambrosio Puente (interim)
- Nayarit: José de la Peña Ledón
- Nuevo León: José Benítez
- Oaxaca: Genaro V. Vázquez (1925–1928), Francisco López Cortés (1928–1932)
- Puebla: Donato Bravo Izquierdo
- Querétaro: Abraham Araujo
- San Luis Potosí: Saturnino Cedillo
- Sinaloa: vacant
- Sonora: Fausto Topete
- Tabasco: Tomás Taracena Hernández
- Tamaulipas: Juan Rincón
- Tlaxcala: Ignacio Mendoza
- Veracruz: Abel S. Rodríguez (1927-1928), Adalberto Tejeda Olivares (Second Term, 1928-1932)
- Yucatán: Álvaro Torre Díaz
- Zacatecas: Leobardo C. Ruiz

== Events ==
- July 1: 1928 Mexican general election: Álvaro Obregón is elected president for a second time.
- July 17: Cristero War: José de León Toral, a Roman Catholic who supported the Cristeros, assassinates Álvaro Obregón.
- December 1: Emilio Portes Gil becomes president.

== Sports ==
- 1927–28 Primera Fuerza season, won by Club América.
- Mexico at the 1928 Summer Olympics
- Mexico at the 1928 Winter Olympics

== Births ==
- March 19 – Josefina Leiner, actress (d. 2017).
- March 30 – Lilia Prado, actress during the Golden Age of Mexican Cine; (d. 2006)
- April 23 – Olga Harmony, playwright and drama teacher at the Escuela Nacional Preparatoria; (d. 2018).
- April 28 – Evangelina Elizondo, actress (Premio Arlequín 2014; voice of Cinderella in the Walt Disney film), (d. October 2, 2017).
- May 24 – Jacobo Zabludovsky, television anchor (24 Horas), (d. July 2, 2015).
- July 21 – Josefina Echánove, actress, model and journalist
- August 23 – Heberto Castillo, civil engineer and politician from Veracruz; (d. 1997)
- October 5 – Enrique González Rojo Jr., poet, philosopher and teacher (d. March 5, 2021)
- October 7 – Sergio Corona, actor from Hidalgo
- October 24 – Rafael Barraza Sánchez, bishop of Mazatlan (1981-2005), born in Durango; (d. 2020)
- December 25 – Juan Robinson Bours, businessman from Ciudad Obregón, Sonora (d. 2017).
- Date unknown
  - Jacinto Contreras Martínez, polítician (d. May 20, 2018).
  - Melquiades Sánchez Orozco, journalist and radio announcer (d. November 4, 2018)
  - Luisa Josefina Hernández, writer and playwright

== Deaths ==
- February 10 – José Sánchez del Río, Mexican Cristero (b. 1913)
- February 25 – Toribio Romo González, Roman Catholic priest (b. 1900)
- April 22 – José Mora y del Río, Archbishop of Mexico, died in exile in San Antonio, TX; (b. 1854 in Michoacan)
- July 1 – Atilano Cruz Alvarado, Saint of the Cristero War (b. 1901)
- July 12 – Emilio Carranza, pilot (b. Coahuila 1905)
- July 17 – Álvaro Obregón, 39th President of Mexico; assassinated after being reelected in 1928 (b. 1880)
