= 2001 in Mexico =

- Decades: 1980s; 1990s; 2000s; 2010s; 2020s
- See also: History of Mexico; List of years in Mexico; Timeline of Mexican history

Events in the year 2001 in Mexico.

== Incumbents ==
=== Federal government ===
- President: Vicente Fox PAN
- Interior Secretary (SEGOB): Santiago Creel
- Secretary of Foreign Affairs (SRE): Jorge Castañeda Gutman
- Communications Secretary (SCT): Pedro Cerisola
- Education Secretary (SEP): Reyes Tamez
- Secretary of Defense (SEDENA): Gerardo Clemente Vega
- Secretary of Navy (SEMAR): Marco Antonio Peyrot González
- Secretary of Labor and Social Welfare (STPS): José Carlos María Abascal Carranza
- Secretary of Welfare (SEDESOL): Josefina Vázquez Mota
- Tourism Secretary (SECTUR): Leticia Navarro
- Secretary of the Environment (SEMARNAT): Víctor Lichtinger
- Secretary of Health (SALUD): Julio Frenk
- Attorney General of Mexico (PRG): Rafael Macedo de la Concha

=== Supreme Court ===
- President of the Supreme Court: Genaro David Góngora Pimentel

=== Governors ===
- Aguascalientes: Felipe González González PAN
- Baja California
  - Alejandro González Alcocer PAN, until October 31.
  - Eugenio Elorduy Walther PAN, starting November 1.
- Baja California Sur: Leonel Cota Montaño PRD
- Campeche: José Antonio González Curi
- Chiapas: Pablo Salazar Mendiguchía PRD
- Chihuahua: Patricio Martínez García PRI
- Coahuila: Enrique Martínez y Martínez PRI
- Colima: Fernando Moreno Peña PRI
- Durango: Ángel Sergio Guerrero Mier PRI
- Guanajuato: Juan Carlos Romero Hicks PAN
- Guerrero: René Juárez Cisneros PRI
- Hidalgo: Manuel Ángel Núñez Soto PRI
- Jalisco: Alberto Cárdenas PAN
- State of Mexico: Arturo Montiel PRI
- Michoacán: Víctor Manuel Tinoco Rubí PRI
- Morelos: Sergio Estrada Cajigal Ramírez PAN.
- Nayarit: Antonio Echevarría Domínguez
- Nuevo León: Fernando Canales Clariond PAN
- Oaxaca: José Murat Casab PRI
- Puebla: Melquíades Morales PRI
- Querétaro: Ignacio Loyola Vera PAN
- Quintana Roo: Joaquín Hendricks Díaz PRI
- San Luis Potosí: Fernando Silva Nieto
- Sinaloa: Juan S. Millán PRI
- Sonora: Armando López Nogales
- Tabasco: Enrique Priego Oropeza PRI, acting governor January 1-December 31
- Tamaulipas: Tomás Yarrington PRI
- Tlaxcala: Alfonso Sánchez Anaya PRD
- Veracruz: Miguel Alemán Velasco PRI
- Yucatán: Víctor Cervera Pacheco PRI
- Zacatecas: Ricardo Monreal PRD
- Head of Government of the Federal District: Andrés Manuel López Obrador PRD

== Events ==
=== January ===
- Soldiers on patrol near Lindavista, Guerrero shoot at two unarmed civilians, killing 14-year-old Esteban Martínez Nazario.
- Five workers at the Kukdong apparel factory in Puebla are dismissed for organizing an independent union, sparking a work stoppage.

=== March ===
- March 16: Mexico City’s municipal government announces plans to transition city computers to the Linux operating system, with the goal of reducing software costs.

=== April ===
- April 29: The Guadalajara Mexico Temple is opened in Mexico City.

=== June ===
- Mexican presidential expenses controversy - The newspaper Milenio reports that President Vicente Fox’s office spent around US$440,000 redecorating two cabins in Los Pinos, including $400 towels and $1,500 sheets, sparking a public controversy.

=== July ===
- The PAN win the gubernatorial election in Baja California, while the PRI regain the mayoralty of Chihuahua and make gains in Durango and Zacatecas.

=== August ===
- Gay activist César Salazar Gongora is kidnapped and assaulted in Mérida, Yucatán, later facing threats for filing a complaint.

=== September ===
- September 11: The 9/11 Terrorist attacks in the U.S. kill 31 Mexican citizens and prompt widespread sympathy in Mexico.
- September 28: Nuestra Belleza México 2001

=== October ===
- October 18: Human rights lawyer Digna Ochoa is found murdered in her Mexico City office; with a note left at the scene threatening her colleagues.

=== November ===
- November 22: The Mexican Council on Foreign Relations is established
- November 27: President Vicente Fox appoints a special prosecutor to investigate more than 500 forced disappearances from the 1970s.

=== December ===
- Ernesto Fonseca Carrillo, convicted in the 1985 killing of DEA agent Enrique Camarena, is acquitted of drug trafficking charges but remains imprisoned.

=== Undated ===
- Mexico launches the e-México initiative, aiming to provide nationwide Internet access and offer online educational, health, and government services. The project receives no funding in 2001.
- Pemexgate is uncovered.

== Awards ==
- Belisario Domínguez Medal of Honor – José Ezequiel Iturriaga Sauco
- Order of the Aztec Eagle
- National Prize for Arts and Sciences
- National Public Administration Prize
- Ohtli Award
  - Marco Antonio Firebaugh
  - Raúl Héctor Castro
  - Carlos Cortez
  - Enrique Moreno
  - Cecilia Muñoz

== Births ==
- January 17 - Angie Vazquez, Mexican singer, and banded from Vazquez Sounds.
- August 24 – Mildred Maldonado, rhythmic gymnast

== Deaths ==
- June 3 – Anthony Quinn, Mexican-American actor, painter, writer, and film director (b. 1915)

== Hurricanes ==
- August 14–22: Tropical Storm Chantal (2001)
- September 21 – October 3: Hurricane Juliette (2001)
- October 4–9: Hurricane Iris

== Film ==
- List of Mexican films of 2001

== Sport ==
- Primera División de México Verano 2001
- Primera División de México Invierno 2001
- Mexico loses 2001 Copa América final to Colombia
- Sin Piedad (2001)
- Juicio Final (2001)
- 2001 Centrobasket is held in Toluca,
- Estudiantes de Altamira and Estudiantes de Xalapa are founded.
