= 1929 in Mexico =

- Decades: 1900s; 1910s; 1920s; 1930s; 1940s
- See also: History of Mexico; List of years in Mexico; Timeline of Mexican history

Events from the year 1929 in Mexico

== Incumbents ==
=== Federal government ===
- President: Emilio Portes Gil
- Interior Secretary (SEGOB): Felipe Canales
- Secretary of Foreign Affairs (SRE):
- Communications Secretary (SCT): Javier Sánchez Mejorada
- Education Secretary (SEP): Ezequiel Padilla

=== Supreme Court ===
- President of the Supreme Court:

=== Governors ===
- Aguascalientes: Manuel Carpio Velázquez (PNR)
- Campeche: Ramiro Bojórquez Castillo
- Chiapas: : Raymundo E. Enríquez (1928–1929), Ernesto Constantino Herrera (1929), Alvaro Cancino (1929)
- Chihuahua: 1928 - 1929: Marcelo Caraveo (1928-1929), Luis L. León (1929), Francisco R. Almada (1929), Luis L. León (1929), Francisco R. Almada (1929-1930)
- Coahuila: Manuel Pérez Treviño (1925-1929), es:Nazario S. Ortiz Garza (PNR, 1929–1933)
- Colima: Laureano Cervantes
- Durango:
- Guanajuato: Agustín Arroyo
- Guerrero: Adrián Castrejón (PNR)
- Hidalgo: Matías Rodríguez (1925–1929), Bartolomé Vargas Lugo (1929–1933)
- Jalisco: Margarito Ramírez (1927–1929), José María Cuellar (1929–1930)
- State of Mexico: Carlos Riva Palacio, (1925–1929), Filiberto Gómez (PNR, 1929–1933)
- Michoacán: : Lázaro Cárdenas (1928–1929), Dámaso Cárdenas del Río (1929–1930)
- Morelos: Ambrosio Puente (interim)
- Nayarit: José de la Peña Ledón
- Nuevo León: Plutarco Elías Calles (son) (PNR, 1929), National Revolutionary Party, PNR, Generoso Chapa Garza, (PNR 1929), Aarón Sáenz, (PNR, 1929–1931)
- Oaxaca: Francisco López Cortés
- Puebla: Donato Bravo Izquierdo (1927-1929), Leónides Andrew Almazán (PNR, 1929-1932)
- Querétaro: Abraham Araujo (1927-1929), Ángel Vázquez Mellado (1929), Ramón Anaya (1929-1931)
- San Luis Potosí: Saturnino Cedillo
- Sinaloa: Macario Gaxiola (PNR)
- Sonora: Fausto Topete (1927–1929), Francisco S. Elías (PNR, 1929–1931)
- Tabasco: vacant
- Tamaulipas: Juan Rincón (1928–1929), Baudelio Villanueva (PNR), Francisco Castellanos (PNR, 1929–1933)
- Tlaxcala: Ignacio Mendoza (1925-1929), Adrián Vázquez Sánchez (PRI, 1929-1933)
- Veracruz: Adalberto Tejeda Olivares (Second Term)
- Yucatán: Álvaro Torre Díaz
- Zacatecas: Leobardo C. Ruiz

== Events ==
- March 3 – Escobar Rebellion: A revolt by Generals José Gonzalo Escobar and Jesús María Aguirre, challenging the power of Plutarco Elías Calles, ends in failure.
- June 21 – Cristero War: The Mexican government and Archbishop Leopoldo Ruiz y Flóres sign an agreement which allowed worship to resume in Mexico and granted three concessions to the Catholics, bringing an end to the Cristero War.
- November 17 – 1929 Mexican presidential election: Pascual Ortiz Rubio of the National Revolutionary Party is elected the new President. It is now widely thought that the election was rigged.

=== Ongoing ===
- Mexican Repatriation (1929–1936)

== Births ==
- January 4 – Aldo Monti, actor (died 2016)
- February 24 – Modesta Lavana, healer and activist for indigenous rights in Hueyapan (died 2010)
- March 24 – Ángela Gurría, sculptor (died 2023)
- April 5 – Vicente García Bernal, Bishop of Roman Catholic Diocese of Ciudad Obregón (1988–2005). (died 2017)
- April 28 – Evangelina Elizondo, actress (died 2017)
- July 28 – José Solé, stage actor and director (Premio Nacional de Ciencias y Artes) (d. 2017)
- August 20 – Carlos Ancira, film actor (died 1987)
- October 17 — Sergio Chávez Saldaña, Chihuahua surgeon and teacher (d. 2018).
- November 18 — Francisco Savín, composer and director of Xalapa Symphony Orchestra (1963-1967); (d. 2018).
- Date unknown — Adela Peralta Leppe, actress, first female clown in Mexico (d. 2018)

== Deaths ==
- 10 January – Julio Antonio Mella, activist
- March 20 – Miguel Alemán González, general (born 1884)

=== Date unknown ===
- Benigno Montoya Muñoz, architect, sculptor and painter (b. 1865)
