= 2002 in Mexico =

- Decades: 1980s; 1990s; 2000s; 2010s; 2020s
- See also: History of Mexico; List of years in Mexico; Timeline of Mexican history

Events in the year 2002 in Mexico.

== Incumbents ==
=== Federal government ===
- President: Vicente Fox PAN
- Interior Secretary (SEGOB): Santiago Creel
- Secretary of Foreign Affairs (SRE): Jorge Castañeda Gutman
- Communications Secretary (SCT): Pedro Cerisola
- Education Secretary (SEP): Reyes Tamez
- Secretary of Defense (SEDENA): Gerardo Clemente Vega
- Secretary of Navy (SEMAR): Marco Antonio Peyrot González
- Secretary of Labor and Social Welfare (STPS): José Carlos María Abascal Carranza
- Secretary of Welfare (SEDESOL): Josefina Vázquez Mota
- Tourism Secretary (SECTUR): Leticia Navarro
- Secretary of the Environment (SEMARNAT): Víctor Lichtinger
- Secretary of Health (SALUD): Julio Frenk
- Attorney General of Mexico (PRG): Rafael Macedo de la Concha

=== Supreme Court ===
- President of the Supreme Court: Genaro David Góngora Pimentel

=== Governors ===
- Aguascalientes: Felipe González González PAN
- Baja California: Eugenio Elorduy Walther PAN
- Baja California Sur: Leonel Cota Montaño, PRD
- Campeche: José Antonio González Curi
- Chiapas: Pablo Salazar Mendiguchía PRD
- Chihuahua: Patricio Martínez García PRI
- Coahuila: Enrique Martínez y Martínez PRI
- Colima: Fernando Moreno Peña PRI
- Durango: Ángel Sergio Guerrero Mier PRI
- Guanajuato: Juan Carlos Romero Hicks PAN
- Guerrero: René Juárez Cisneros PRI
- Hidalgo: Manuel Ángel Núñez Soto PRI
- Jalisco: Alberto Cárdenas PAN
- State of Mexico: Arturo Montiel PRI
- Michoacán
  - Víctor Manuel Tinoco Rubí PRI (date not available)
  - Lázaro Cárdenas Batel PRD (date not available)
- Morelos: Sergio Estrada Cajigal Ramírez PAN.
- Nayarit: Antonio Echevarría Domínguez
- Nuevo León: Fernando Canales Clariond PAN
- Oaxaca: José Murat Casab PRI
- Puebla: Melquíades Morales PRI
- Querétaro: Ignacio Loyola Vera PAN
- Quintana Roo: Joaquín Hendricks Díaz PRI
- San Luis Potosí: Fernando Silva Nieto
- Sinaloa: Juan S. Millán PRI
- Sonora: Armando López Nogales PRI
- Tabasco: Manuel Andrade Díaz PAN, starting January 1
- Tamaulipas: Tomás Yarrington PRI
- Tlaxcala: Alfonso Sánchez Anaya PRD
- Veracruz: Miguel Alemán Velasco PRI
- Yucatán: Víctor Cervera Pacheco PRI
- Zacatecas: Ricardo Monreal PRD
- Head of Government of the Federal District: Andrés Manuel López Obrador PRD

== Events ==
- January 23 – La Espuela Coal Mine disaster caused the death of 13 miners
- February 28 – The El Heraldo de Mexico Awards took place.
- March 18 – The Monterrey Consensus from the International Conference on Financing for Development begins in Nuevo Leon.
- September 20 – Hurricane Isidore (category 3) reaches the Yucatán Peninsula
- October 25 – Hurricane Kenna (category 5) reaches Puerto Vallarta
- October 30 – Banco Azteca begins operations
- November 10 – The ITU World Triathlon Series take place in Cancún.

== Awards ==
- Belisario Domínguez Medal of Honor – Héctor Fix Zamudio
- Order of the Aztec Eagle
- National Prize for Arts and Sciences
- National Public Administration Prize
- Ohtli Award
  - Rosa Ramirez Guerrero
  - Richard Joel Noriega

== Popular culture ==
- March 3 – Beginning of the reality show Big Brother
- May 15 – The Los Premios MTV Latinoamérica 2002 take place in Mexico City
- June 30 – The reality show La Academia begins.
- July 4 – The TV y Novelas Awards take place in Mexico City.

=== Sports ===
- Primera División de México Verano 2002
- Primera División de México Apertura 2002

=== Film ===
==== Documentaries ====
- Gabriel Orozco
- Niños de la calle
- Los últimos zapatistas, héroes olvidados
- Acosada (De piel de víbora)

==== Fiction ====
- Amar te duele
- Aro Tolbukhin. En la mente del asesino
- Dark Cites (Ciudades oscuras)
- El crimen del padre Amaro
- eXXXorcismos
- Francisca (... De qué lado estás?)
- El gavilán de la sierra
- La habitación azul
- Seres humanos
- El tigre de Santa Julia
- Una de dos
- La virgen de la lujuria

== Births ==
- February 5 – Paulina Villarreal, drummer

== Deaths ==
- January 3 – Juan García Esquivel (84), musician
- February 10 – Ramón Arellano Félix (37), drug lord
- April 8 – María Félix, 88, Mexican actress (b. April 8, 1914)
- October 11 – Emilio García Riera, 70, actor, writer and cinema critic (b. 1931)
- October 19 – Manuel Alvarez Bravo (100), photographer
- November 6 – Alfonso Martínez Domínguez (80), politician
- November 21 – Arturo Guzmán Decena
- December 2 – Ivan Illich, Austrian Catholic priest and philosopher who co-founded the Centro Intercultural de Documentación in Cuernavaca (b. 1926).
