= 2005 in Mexico =

- Decades: 1980s; 1990s; 2000s; 2010s; 2020s
- See also: History of Mexico; List of years in Mexico; Timeline of Mexican history

Events in the year 2005 in Mexico.

== Incumbents ==
=== Federal government ===
- President: Vicente Fox PAN
- Interior Secretary (SEGOB): Santiago Creel
- Secretary of Foreign Affairs (SRE): Luis Ernesto Derbez
- Communications Secretary (SCT): Pedro Cerisola
- Education Secretary (SEP): Reyes Tamez
- Secretary of Defense (SEDENA): Gerardo Clemente Vega
- Secretary of Navy (SEMAR): Marco Antonio Peyrot González
- Secretary of Labor and Social Welfare (STPS)
  - José Carlos María Abascal Carranza (date of resignation not available)
  - Francisco Javier Salazar Sáenz (date of appointment not available)
- Secretary of Welfare (SEDESOL): Josefina Vázquez Mota
- Tourism Secretary (SECTUR): Rodolfo Elizondo Torres
- Secretary of the Environment (SEMARNAT)
  - Alberto Cárdenas Jiménez, until June 23
  - José Luis Luege Tamargo, starting June 23
- Secretary of Health (SALUD): Julio Frenk
- Attorney General of Mexico (PRG)
  - Rafael Macedo de la Concha, until April 27
  - Daniel Cabeza de Vaca, starting April 28

=== Supreme Court ===
- President of the Supreme Court: Mariano Azuela Güitrón

=== Governors ===
- Aguascalientes: Luis Armando Reynoso PAN
- Baja California: Eugenio Elorduy Walther PAN
- Baja California Sur
  - Leonel Cota Montaño PRD, until April 5.
  - Narciso Agúndez Montaño PRD, starting April 5.
- Campeche: Jorge Carlos Hurtado Valdez PRI
- Chiapas: Pablo Salazar Mendiguchía PRD
- Chihuahua: José Reyes Baeza Terrazas PRI
- Coahuila
  - Enrique Martínez y Martínez PRI, until February 15
  - Humberto Moreira PRI, starting February 17
- Colima: Gustavo Vázquez Montes PRI
- Durango: Ismael Hernández PRI
- Guanajuato: Juan Carlos Romero Hicks PAN
- Guerrero
  - René Juárez Cisneros PRI, date not available
  - Zeferino Torreblanca PRD, date not available
- Hidalgo
  - Manuel Ángel Núñez Soto PRI, until March 31
  - Miguel Ángel Osorio Chong PRI, starting April 1
- Jalisco: Alberto Cárdenas PAN
- State of Mexico
  - Arturo Montiel PRI, until September 16
  - Enrique Peña Nieto PRI, starting September 16
- Michoacán: Lázaro Cárdenas Batel PRD
- Morelos: Sergio Estrada Cajigal Ramírez PAN
- Nayarit
  - Antonio Echevarría Domínguez, until September
  - Ney González Sánchez, starting September
- Nuevo León: Fernando Canales Clariond PAN
- Oaxaca: Ulises Ruiz Ortiz PRI
- Puebla
  - Melquíades Morales PRI, until January 31
  - Mario Plutarco Marín Torres PRI, starting February 1
- Querétaro: Francisco Garrido Patrón PAN
- Quintana Roo
  - Joaquín Hendricks Díaz PRI, until April 4
  - Félix González Canto PRI, starting April 5
- San Luis Potosí: Jesús Marcelo de los Santos PAN
- Sinaloa: Juan S. Millán PRI, until December 31
- Sonora: Eduardo Bours PRI
- Tabasco: Manuel Andrade Díaz PAN, starting January 1
- Tamaulipas
  - Tomás Yarrington PRI, until February 1
  - Eugenio Hernández Flores PRI, starting February 5
- Tlaxcala: Alfonso Sánchez Anaya PRD
- Veracruz: Fidel Herrera Beltrán PRI
- Yucatán: Víctor Cervera Pacheco PRI
- Zacatecas: Amalia García PRD
- Head of Government of the Federal District: Alejandro Encinas Rodríguez PRD

== Events ==
- CUMEX is formed.
- The Socialist Alliance (Mexico) is formed.
- The Centro de Investigaciones Cientifícas de las Huastecas 'Aguazarca' is founded.
- January 30 – New Alliance Party founded.
- March 23 – The Security and Prosperity Partnership of North America is signed by the leaders of Canada, Mexico and the United States in Waco, Texas.
- March 29 – Ariel Award in 2005
- April 7 – The Chamber of Deputies votes to lift Andrés Manuel López Obrador's constitutional immunity against prosecution (desafuero).
- April 16–17 – National Assembly of the Socialist Left
- May 8 – 2005 Denver police officer shooting
- June 8: Alejandro Domínguez Coello is murdered.
- July 18 – Hurricane Emily (category 4) hits the Yucatán Peninsula.
- September 2 – Nuestra Belleza México 2005
- September 8 – The Mexican Army is received with honors at Kelly Air Force Base, Texas in response to Hurricane Katrina.
- October 4 – Hurricane Stan (category 1) hits the state of Veracruz.
- October 21 – Hurricane Wilma (category 4) hits the Yucatán Peninsula.
- November 4 – Start of the Mar del Plata Summit of the Americas.
- November 7 – radio program El Weso starts airing.
- November 10 – Beginning of the 2005 Mexico and Venezuela diplomatic crisis.
- December 9 – the Mesoamerican Energy Integration Program was signed between by Mexico, Colombia, Dominican Republic and Central America.
- December 25 — The Popocateptl volcano's crater produced an explosion which ejected a large column of smoke and ash about 3 km (1.9 mi) into the atmosphere and expulsion of lava.

== Elections ==
- 2005 Coahuila state election
- 2005 Colima gubernatorial election
- 2005 State of Mexico election

== Awards ==
- Belisario Domínguez Medal of Honor - Gilberto Borja Navarrete
- Order of the Aztec Eagle
- National Prize for Arts and Sciences
- National Public Administration Prize
- Ohtli Award
  - Marylou Olivarez Mason
  - Miguel D. Wise
  - Blanca Alvarado
  - Ruben Barrales

== Popular culture ==
=== Sports ===
- Primera División de México Clausura 2005
- Primera División de México Apertura 2005
- 2005 InterLiga
- Fútbol Americano
- 2005 Mexican Figure Skating Championships
- 2005 Gran Premio Telmex/Tecate
- 2005 Desafío Corona season
- 2005 Rally México
- 2005 Caribbean Series in Mazatlán
- Homenaje a Dos Leyendas (2005)
- 2005 IIHF World Championship Division III won by Mexico in Mexico.

=== Film ===
- March 29 – The XLVII edition of the Ariel Award by the Mexican Academy of Film takes place at the Palacio de Bellas Artes in Mexico City
- November 4 – La mujer de mi hermano

=== Literature ===
Carlos Monsiváis won the National Prize for Arts and Sciences (Premio Nacional de Ciencias y Artes)

=== TV ===
==== Telenovelas ====
- July 18 – Amor en custodia on TV Azteca
- July 18 – La esposa virgen on Televisa
- September 26 – El Amor No Tiene Precio on Televisa
- October 3 – Machos on TV Azteca

== Notable deaths ==
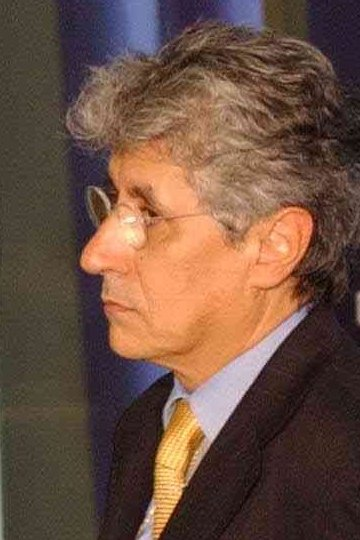
Adolfo Aguilar Zínser

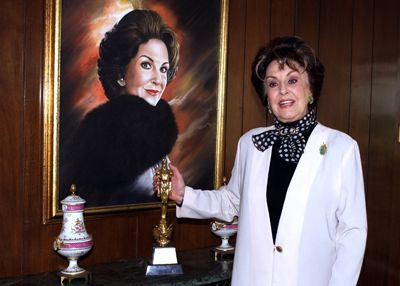
Marga López

- January 5 – Eduardo Hay (89), International Olympic Committee
- January 14 – Ofelia Guilmain (83), Spanish -born film and stage actress
- January 18 – Teodoro Herrera Sosa, politician PRI, former municipal president, Soto la Marina, Tamaulipas;murdered along with wife and two children.
- January 22 – Consuelo Velázquez (88), songwriter and lyricist, and author of the enduring song Bésame Mucho
- February 24 – Gustavo Vázquez Montes (42), incumbent governor of Colima
- March 27 – Rigo Tovar (58), popular singer and composer
- April 10 – Raúl Gibb Guerrero (53), newspaper editor
- April 16 – Dolores Guadalupe García Escamilla (39), journalist
- April 16 – Jaime Fernández (67), actor
- April 29 – Mariana Levy (39), actress
- May 5 – Édgar Ponce (30), actor
- June 5 – Oscar Morelli (59), actor
- June 5 – Adolfo Aguilar Zínser (55), scholar, diplomat and politician
- June 8 – Alejandro Domínguez (52), chief of police of Nuevo Laredo, Tamaulipas
- July 2 – Martin Sanchez (26), boxer
- July 6 – Marga López (81), Argentine -born screen and television actress
- August 6 – Leonardo Rodríguez Alcaine (86), trade union leader
- September 21 – Ramón Martín Huerta (48), minister of public security of the federal government
- November 6 – Ignacio Burgoa Orihuela (87), lawyer and professor
