= 1926 in Mexico =

- Decades: 1900s; 1910s; 1920s; 1930s; 1940s
- See also: History of Mexico; List of years in Mexico; Timeline of Mexican history

The following lists events that have happened in 1926 in Mexico.

== Incumbents ==
=== Federal government ===
- President: Plutarco Elías Calles
- Interior Secretary (SEGOB):
- Secretary of Foreign Affairs (SRE):
- Communications Secretary (SCT):
- Education Secretary (SEP):

=== Supreme Court ===
- President of the Supreme Court:

=== Governors ===
- Aguascalientes: Benjamín Azpeitia Puga/Francisco Reyes Barrientos/Alberto González Hermosillo Barragán
- Campeche: Ángel Castillo Lanz
- Chiapas: Luis P. Vidal
- Chihuahua: Jesús Antonio Almeida
- Coahuila: Manuel Pérez Treviño
- Colima: Gerardo Hurtado Sánchez
- Durango:
- Guanajuato: Enrique Colunga
- Guerrero: Héctor F. López
- Hidalgo: Matías Rodríguez
- Jalisco: José Guadalupe Zuno/Clemente Sepúlveda/Silvano Barba González
- State of Mexico: Carlos Riva Palacio
- Michoacán: Enrique Ramírez Aviña
- Morelos: Provisional Government
- Nayarit: José de la Peña Ledón
- Nuevo León: Jeronimo Siller
- Oaxaca: Genaro V. Vázquez
- Puebla: Donato Bravo Izquierdo
- Querétaro: Abraham Araujo
- San Luis Potosí: Abel Cano Villa
- Sinaloa: Jose Maria Guerrero Sosa
- Sonora: Alejo Bay
- Tabasco: Tomás Garrido Canabal/Santiago Ruiz Sobredo/Augusto Hernández Oliva
- Tamaulipas: Emilio Portes Gil
- Tlaxcala: Ignacio Mendoza
- Veracruz: Heriberto Jara Corona/Abel S. Rodríguez
- Yucatán: Felipe Carrillo Puerto
- Zacatecas: Pedro Belauzarán (until 2 April), Fernando Rodarte (starting 2 April)

== Events ==
- August 3 – Cristero War: Some 400 armed Catholics barricaded themselves in the Church of Our Lady of Guadalupe in Guadalajara, Jalisco and exchanged gunfire with federal troops until they ran out of ammunition and surrendered. According to U.S. consular sources, 18 were killed and 40 wounded.
- October 12–November 2 – The Central American and Caribbean Games take place in Mexico City.

== Births ==
- January 19 — Jose Alfredo Jimenez, singer-songwriter (d. 1973)
- January 24 — Alejandro Cervantes Delgado, economist and politician (PRI); Governor of Guerrero 1981–1987 (d. 2000)
- February 10 — Carmen Romano de Lopez, First Lady of Mexico (1976-1982) (d. 2000).
- March 20 — Marcela Lombardo Otero, daughter of Vicente Lombardo Toledano, politician (Popular Socialist Party (PPS), (d. 2018).
- April 7 – Julio Scherer García, journalist (Excélsior and Proceso) (d. January 7, 2015).
- April 15 — Manuel Capetillo, bullfighter, actor, singer, and songwriter (d. 2009).
- May 29 – Teodoro González de León, architect ("Ciudad Universitaria" of the U.N.A.M.); (d. September 16, 2016).
- August 2 – Geles Cabrera, sculptor (d. 2026)
- August 8 – Arturo García Bustos, painter (d. 2017)
- September 4 — Ivan Illich, Austrian philosopher and Catholic priest who founded the Centro Intercultural de Documentación in Cuernavaca, Morelos (d. 2002).
- October 1 − Miguel León-Portilla, anthropologist and historian (d. 2019).
- November 11 — Cardinal Juan Jesús Posadas Ocampo, archbishop of the Roman Catholic Archdiocese of Guadalajara 1987-1993 (assassinated May 24, 1993)
- December 23 — Leticia Palma, (Zoyla Gloria Ruiz Moscoso) actress (En la palma de tu mano), (d. 2009)
- Date unknown:
  - Valdemar Jiménez Solís, poet, académic, and cultural journalist (d. August 20, 2017).
  - Antonio Riva Palacio, governor of Morelos 1988-1994 (d. 2014)

== Deaths ==
- July 22: General Vicente Aranda, Zapatista general and municipal president of Jojutla.
