= 2003 in Mexico =

- Decades: 1980s; 1990s; 2000s; 2010s; 2020s
- See also: History of Mexico; List of years in Mexico; Timeline of Mexican history

Events in the year 2003 in Mexico.

== Incumbents ==
=== Federal government ===
- President: Vicente Fox PAN
- Interior Secretary (SEGOB): Santiago Creel
- Secretary of Foreign Affairs (SRE)
  - Jorge Castañeda Gutman, until January 10
  - Luis Ernesto Derbez, starting January 15
- Communications Secretary (SCT): Pedro Cerisola
- Education Secretary (SEP): Reyes Tamez
- Secretary of Defense (SEDENA): Gerardo Clemente Vega
- Secretary of Navy (SEMAR): Marco Antonio Peyrot González
- Secretary of Labor and Social Welfare (STPS): José Carlos María Abascal Carranza
- Secretary of Welfare (SEDESOL): Josefina Vázquez Mota
- Secretary of Tourism (SECTUR)
  - Leticia Navarro, until July 29
  - Rodolfo Elizondo Torres, starting July 29
- Secretary of the Environment (SEMARNAT)
  - Víctor Lichtinger, until June
  - Alberto Cárdenas, starting June
- Secretary of Health (SALUD): Julio Frenk
- Attorney General of Mexico (PRG): Rafael Macedo de la Concha

=== Supreme Court ===
- President of the Supreme Court: Mariano Azuela Güitrón

=== Governors ===
- Aguascalientes: Felipe González González PAN
- Baja California: Eugenio Elorduy Walther PAN
- Baja California Sur: Leonel Cota Montaño PRD
- Campeche
  - José Antonio González Curi, until September 15
  - Jorge Carlos Hurtado Valdez PRI, starting September 16
- Chiapas: Pablo Salazar Mendiguchía PRI
- Chihuahua: Patricio Martínez García PRI
- Coahuila: Enrique Martínez y Martínez PRI
- Colima
  - Fernando Moreno Peña PRI, until October 31
  - Carlos Flores Dueñas PRI, interim governor November 1-December 31
- Durango: Ángel Sergio Guerrero Mier PRI
- Guanajuato: Juan Carlos Romero Hicks PAN
- Guerrero: René Juárez Cisneros PRI
- Hidalgo: Manuel Ángel Núñez Soto PRI
- Jalisco: Alberto Cárdenas PAN
- State of Mexico: Arturo Montiel PRI
- Michoacán: Lázaro Cárdenas Batel PRD
- Morelos: Sergio Estrada Cajigal Ramírez PAN.
- Nayarit: Antonio Echevarría Domínguez
- Nuevo León: Fernando Canales Clariond PAN
- Oaxaca: José Murat Casab PRI
- Puebla: Melquíades Morales PRI
- Querétaro
  - Ignacio Loyola Vera PAN, until September 30
  - Francisco Garrido Patrón PAN, starting October 1
- Quintana Roo: Joaquín Hendricks Díaz PRI
- San Luis Potosí
  - Fernando Silva Nieto, until September 25
  - Jesús Marcelo de los Santos PAN, Starting September 26
- Sinaloa: Juan S. Millán PRI
- Sonora
  - Armando López Nogales PRI, until September 13
  - Eduardo Bours PRI, starting September 13
- Tabasco: Manuel Andrade Díaz PAN, starting January 1
- Tamaulipas: Tomás Yarrington PRI
- Tlaxcala: Alfonso Sánchez Anaya PRD
- Veracruz: Miguel Alemán Velasco PRI
- Yucatán: Víctor Cervera Pacheco PRI
- Zacatecas: Ricardo Monreal PRD
- Head of Government of the Federal District: Andrés Manuel López Obrador PRD

== Events ==
- Fahrenheit has its first issue published.
- The Chiapas Bridge is finished with being constructed.
- The México Posible party is founded and dissolved.
- January 21: 2003 Colima earthquake.
- February 18: The State of Mexico votes in a referendum on the death penalty. 82% of the 806,416 people who voted, voted Yes for the death penalty on crimes of murder, kidnapping, child theft and violent assaults.
- March 13: Instituto Nacional de Lenguas Indígenas is created.
- June 2: The Escuela Preparatoria Tlalpan II "Otilio Montaño" is inaugurated.
- July 5: The National Commission for the Development of Indigenous Peoples goes into effect.
- July 6: 2003 Mexican legislative election
- September: World Trade Organization Ministerial Conference of 2003 in Cancun.
- September 5: Nuestra Belleza México 2003.
- September 28: Optibús starts operations.
- November 15: Miss Latin America 2004 held in Cancun.
- November 27: the Monterrey Arena is opened.
- December 9 – 11: The United Nations Convention Against Corruption is opened for signing in Mérida, Yucatán.
- December 22: Counter-terrorism base Ixtoc-Alfa is founded by the Mexican Navy.

== Hurricanes ==
- June 26 – 27: Tropical Storm Carlos (2003)
- June 29 – July 2: Tropical Storm Bill (2003)
- July 8 – 17: Hurricane Claudette (2003)
- August 14 – 17: Hurricane Erika (2003)
- August 22 – 27: Hurricane Ignacio (2003)
- September 8 – 24: Hurricane Marty (2003)
- October 1 – 6: Tropical Storm Larry (2003)

== Awards ==
- Belisario Domínguez Medal of Honor - Luis González y González
- Order of the Aztec Eagle
- National Prize for Arts and Sciences
- National Public Administration Prize
- Ohtli Award
  - Marco A. López Jr.
  - Patricia Madrid

== Sport ==
- Primera División de México Clausura 2003
- Primera División de México Apertura 2003
- Mexico win the 2003 CONCACAF Gold Cup
- 2003 Centrobasket held in Culiacán
- 2003 Centrobasket Women
- 2003 Mexican Figure Skating Championships
- 2003 Gran Premio Telmex-Gigante
- 2003 MasterCard Truck Series season
- 2003 Tecate Telmex Monterrey Grand Prix
- Homenaje a Dos Leyendas: El Santo y Salvador Lutteroth (2003)
- 2003 IIHF World U18 Championship Division III co-hosted with Bosnia
- 2003 Men's NORCECA Volleyball Championship Culiacan, Sinaloa
- 2003 Women's Pan-American Volleyball Cup Saltillo, Coahuila
- 2003 Central American and Caribbean Cross Country Championships
- Mexico at the 2003 Pan American Games
- 2003 Pan American Race Walking Cup from San Diego, California, United States to Tijuana, Baja California.
- C.F. Mérida founded.
- Tijuana Dragons founded.
- Monterrey Fury founded.

== Film ==
- List of Mexican films of 2003

== Births ==
- January 16 – Adriana Hernández, rhythmic gymnast
- May 8 – Joaquín Bondoni, singer, songwriter and actor
- September 18 – Ana Galindo, rhythmic gymnast

== Deaths ==
- February 11: Socorro Avelar, actress (b. 1925)
- June 10: Alfredo Guati Rojo watercolor artist (b. December 1, 1918)
- November 1: Humberto Briseño Sierra, Mexican lawyer (b. 1914)
- November 6: Eduardo Palomo, actor (Corazón salvaje (1993 TV series)) (b. 1962)
