= 1942 in Mexico =

- Decades: 1920s; 1930s; 1940s; 1950s; 1960s
- See also: History of Mexico; List of years in Mexico; Timeline of Mexican history

Events in the year 1942 in Mexico.

== Events ==
- May 22 – Mexico formally declared war on the Axis powers in support of the Allies.
- August 6 – The 1942 Guatemala earthquake occurred.

== Births ==
- 16 May — Graciela Iturbide, photographer
- 3 July — Paco Stanley, TV personality, actor, and comedian
- 5 September — Eduardo Mata, conductor and composer
