= 2004 in Mexico =

- Decades: 1980s; 1990s; 2000s; 2010s; 2020s
- See also: History of Mexico; List of years in Mexico; Timeline of Mexican history

This is a list of events that happened in 2004 in Mexico.

== Incumbents ==
=== Federal government ===
- President: Vicente Fox PAN
- Interior Secretary (SEGOB): Santiago Creel
- Secretary of Foreign Affairs (SRE): Luis Ernesto Derbez
- Communications Secretary (SCT): Pedro Cerisola
- Education Secretary (SEP): Reyes Tamez
- Secretary of Defense (SEDENA): Gerardo Clemente Vega
- Secretary of Navy (SEMAR): Marco Antonio Peyrot González
- Secretary of Labor and Social Welfare (STPS): José Carlos María Abascal Carranza
- Secretary of Welfare (SEDESOL): Josefina Vázquez Mota
- Tourism Secretary (SECTUR): Rodolfo Elizondo Torres
- Secretary of the Environment (SEMARNAT): Alberto Cárdenas
- Secretary of Health (SALUD): Julio Frenk
- Attorney General of Mexico (PRG): Rafael Macedo de la Concha

=== Supreme Court ===
- President of the Supreme Court: Mariano Azuela Güitrón

=== Governors ===
- Aguascalientes
  - Felipe González González PAN, until August 25
  - Juan José León Rubio, Interim governor, August 25–November 30
  - Luis Armando Reynoso PAN, starting December 1
- Baja California: Eugenio Elorduy Walther PAN
- Baja California Sur: Leonel Cota Montaño PRD
- Campeche: Jorge Carlos Hurtado Valdez PRI
- Chiapas: Pablo Salazar Mendiguchía PRD
- Chihuahua
  - Patricio Martínez García PRI, until October 3
  - José Reyes Baeza Terrazas PRI, starting October 4
- Coahuila: Enrique Martínez y Martínez PRI
- Colima: Gustavo Vázquez Montes PRI, starting January 1
- Durango
  - Ángel Sergio Guerrero Mier PRI, until September 14
  - Ismael Hernández PRI, starting September 15
- Guanajuato: Juan Carlos Romero Hicks PAN
- Guerrero: René Juárez Cisneros PRI
- Hidalgo: Manuel Ángel Núñez Soto PRI
- Jalisco: Alberto Cárdenas PAN
- State of Mexico: Arturo Montiel PRI
- Michoacán: Lázaro Cárdenas Batel PRD
- Morelos: Sergio Estrada Cajigal Ramírez PAN
- Nayarit: Antonio Echevarría Domínguez
- Nuevo León: Fernando Canales Clariond PAN
- Oaxaca
  - José Murat Casab PRI, until November 30
  - Ulises Ruiz Ortiz PRI, starting December 1
- Puebla: Melquíades Morales PRI
- Querétaro
  - Ignacio Loyola Vera PAN, until September 30
  - Francisco Garrido Patrón PAN, starting October 1
- Quintana Roo: Joaquín Hendricks Díaz PRI
- San Luis Potosí
  - Fernando Silva Nieto, until September 25
  - Jesús Marcelo de los Santos PAN, starting September 26
- Sinaloa: Juan S. Millán PRI, until December 31
- Sonora: Eduardo Bours PRI
- Tabasco: Manuel Andrade Díaz PAN, starting January 1
- Tamaulipas: Tomás Yarrington PRI
- Tlaxcala: Alfonso Sánchez Anaya PRD
- Veracruz
  - Miguel Alemán Velasco PRI, until November 30
  - Fidel Herrera Beltrán PRI, starting December 1
- Yucatán: Víctor Cervera Pacheco PRI
- Zacatecas
  - Ricardo Monreal PRD, until September 11
  - Amalia García PRD, starting September 12
- Head of Government of the Federal District: Andrés Manuel López Obrador PRD

== Events ==
- Videoscandals
- The Desafuero of Manuel López Obrador
- The Vallarta Botanical Gardens are founded.
- The new Museo Estatal de Arte Popular de Oaxaca gets inaugurated.
- The National Institute of Genomic Medicine INMEGEN is founded.
- January 12–13: Monterrey Special Summit of the Americas
- March 30: Ariel Award ceremony at the Palacio de Bellas Artes.
- April 30: the Avena case is decided.
- May 13: 2004 Mexican UFO incident
- May 23: The Comando Jaramillista Morelense 23 de Mayo bomb 3 banks in Cuernavaca, Morelos,
- September 10–20: Hurricane Javier (2004)
- September 11: Nuestra Belleza México 2004
- December 26: 3 Mexicans are among the victims of the 2004 Indian Ocean tsunami.

== Elections ==
- 2004 Chihuahua state election
- 2004 Durango state election
- 2004 Oaxaca state election
- 2004 Zacatecas state election

== Awards ==
- Belisario Domínguez Medal of Honor - Carlos Canseco González
- Order of the Aztec Eagle
- National Prize for Arts and Sciences
- National Public Administration Prize
- Ohtli Award
  - Nancy "Rusty" Barceló
  - Bob Menedez

== Sport ==
- Primera División de México Clausura 2004
- Primera División de México Apertura 2004
- 2004 InterLiga
- 2004 Desafío Corona season
- 2004 Gran Premio Telmex/Tecate
- Homenaje a Dos Leyendas: El Santo y Salvador Lutteroth (2004)
- Mexico at the 2004 Summer Olympics
- Mexico at the 2004 Summer Paralympics
- 2004 World Karate Championships in Monterrey, Nuevo Leon
- 2004 Mexican Figure Skating Championships
- 2004 Women's Pan-American Volleyball Cup in Mexicali and Tijuana, Baja California.
- 1st AIBA American 2004 Olympic Qualifying Tournament in Tijuana.
- 2004 Central American and Caribbean Junior Championships in Athletics in Coatzacoalcos
- The Bravos de Nuevo Laredo, Búhos de Hermosillo, Vaqueros de Ixtlan CF and the Azucareros de Tezonapa are founded.

== Deaths ==
- February 17 – José López Portillo, 51st President of Mexico 1976-1982 (b. 1920)
- August 18 — Víctor Cervera Pacheco, politician (PRI); Governor of Yucatán 1984–1988 and 1995–2001 (b. 1936)
