= 2000 in Mexico =

- Decades: 1980s; 1990s; 2000s; 2010s; 2020s
- See also: History of Mexico; List of years in Mexico; Timeline of Mexican history

The following lists events that happened during 2000 in Mexico.

== Incumbents ==
=== Federal government ===
==== President ====
- President
  - Ernesto Zedillo PRI, until November 30
  - Vicente Fox, PAN, starting December 1 Fox was the first president not affiliated with PRI since 1929.

==== Cabinet ====
- Interior Secretary (SEGOB)
  - Diódoro Carrasco Altamirano, until November 30
  - Santiago Creel, starting December 1
- Secretary of Foreign Affairs (SRE)
  - Rosario Green, until November 30
  - Jorge Castañeda Gutman, starting December 1
- Communications Secretary (SCT)
  - Carlos Ruiz Sacristán, until November 30
  - Pedro Cerisola, starting December 1
- Education Secretary (SEP)
  - Miguel Limón Rojas, until November 30
  - Reyes Tamez, starting December 1
- Secretary of Defense (SEDENA)
  - Enrique Cervantes Aguirre, until November 30
  - Gerardo Clemente Vega, starting December 1
- Secretary of Navy (SEMAR)
  - José Ramón Lorenzo Franco, until November 30
  - Marco Antonio Peyrot González, starting December 1
- Secretary of Labor and Social Welfare (STPS)
  - Mariano Palacios Alcocer, until November 30
  - José Carlos María Abascal Carranza, starting December 1
- Secretary of Social Development (SEDESOL)
  - Carlos Jarque, until November 30
  - Josefina Vázquez Mota, starting December 1
- Tourism Secretary (SECTUR)
  - Óscar Espinosa Villarreal, until November 30
  - Leticia Navarro, starting December 1
- Secretary of the Environment
  - (SEMARNAP): Julia Carabias Lillo (until November 30)
- (SEMARNAT): Víctor Lichtinger (starting December 1)
- Secretary of Health (SALUD)
  - José Antonio González Fernández, until November 30
  - Julio Frenk, starting December 1
- Attorney General of Mexico (PRG)
  - Jorge Madrazo Cuéllar, until November 30
  - Rafael Macedo de la Concha, starting December 1

=== Supreme Court ===
- President of the Supreme Court: Genaro David Góngora Pimentel

=== Governors ===
- Aguascalientes: Felipe González González PAN
- Baja California: Alejandro González Alcocer PAN
- Baja California Sur: Leonel Cota Montaño PRD
- Campeche: José Antonio González Curi
- Chiapas
  - Roberto Albores Guillén
  - Pablo Salazar Mendiguchía PRD, starting December 8
- Chihuahua: Patricio Martínez García PRI
- Coahuila: Enrique Martínez y Martínez PRI
- Colima: Fernando Moreno Peña PRI
- Durango: Ángel Sergio Guerrero Mier PRI
- Guanajuato
  - Ramón Martín Huerta (substitute) PAN, until September 25
  - Juan Carlos Romero Hicks PAN, starting September 25
- Guerrero: René Juárez Cisneros PRI
- Hidalgo: Manuel Ángel Núñez Soto PRI
- Jalisco: Alberto Cárdenas PAN
- State of Mexico: Arturo Montiel PRI
- Michoacán: Víctor Manuel Tinoco Rubí PRI
- Morelos
  - Jorge Morales Barud (Substitute) PRI, until May 18.
  - Jorge Arturo García Rubí (Interim) PRI, May 18 to September 30.
  - Sergio Estrada Cajigal Ramírez PAN, starting October 1.
- Nayarit: Antonio Echevarría Domínguez
- Nuevo León: Fernando Canales Clariond PAN
- Oaxaca: José Murat Casab PRI
- Puebla: Melquíades Morales PRI
- Querétaro: Ignacio Loyola Vera PAN
- Quintana Roo: Joaquín Hendricks Díaz PRI
- San Luis Potosí: Fernando Silva Nieto
- Sinaloa: Juan S. Millán PRI
- Sonora: Armando López Nogales
- Tabasco: Roberto Madrazo PRI, until December 31
- Tamaulipas: Tomás Yarrington PRI
- Tlaxcala: Alfonso Sánchez Anaya PRD
- Veracruz: Miguel Alemán Velasco PRI
- Yucatán: Víctor Cervera Pacheco PRI
- Zacatecas: Ricardo Monreal PRD
- Head of Government of the Federal District
  - Rosario Robles PRD, until December 4
  - Andrés Manuel López Obrador PRD, starting December 5

== Events ==
- The National Autonomous University of Mexico, which is closed since April 1999, becomes the scene of a mass rally to protest against rising tuition fees and to require student participation in the restructuring of Latin America's main university.
- February 23: Musician Carlos Santana receives 8 Grammy Awards, achieving the same record that Michael Jackson, established in 1983.
- April 15: Pope John Paul II names Eduardo Patino and Hipolito Reyes Larios as bishops of the newly created dioceses of Córdoba and Orizaba in the state of Veracruz.
- July 2: 2000 Mexican general election.
- December: Tens of thousands of people were evacuated from the area near Popocateptl by the government, based on the warnings of scientists. The volcano then made its largest display in 1,200 years.

== Awards ==
- Belisario Domínguez Medal of Honor – Leopoldo Zea Aguilar
- Order of the Aztec Eagle
- National Prize for Arts and Sciences
- National Public Administration Prize
- Ohtli Award
  - Amanda Aguirre
  - Columba Bush
  - Kika de la Garza
  - Juliet V. Garcia
  - Filemon Vela Sr.

== Notable deaths ==
- May 9 — Carmen Romano de Lopez, First Lady of Mexico (1976–1982) (b. 1926).
- September 9 – Carlos Castillo Peraza. Politician and journalist.
- September 17 – Alejandro Cervantes Delgado, politician and economist, governor of Guerrero 1981–1987; heart attack (b. 1926)
- December 31 – Alfonso Corona del Rosal, politician (PRI), Regent of the Federal District; bronchitis and pneumonia
