= List of years in Mexico =

The following is a list of years in Mexico.

== 19th century ==
- 1810s: 1810 1811 1812 1813 1814 1815 1816 1817 1818 1819
- 1820s: 1820 1821 1822 1823 1824 1825 1826 1827 1828 1829
- 1830s: 1830 1831 1832 1833 1834 1835 1836 1837 1838 1839
- 1840s: 1840 1841 1842 1843 1844 1845 1846 1847 1848 1849
- 1850s: 1850 1851 1852 1853 1854 1855 1856 1857 1858 1859
- 1860s: 1860 1861 1862 1863 1864 1865 1866 1867 1868 1869
- 1870s: 1870 1871 1872 1873 1874 1875 1876 1877 1878 1879
- 1880s: 1880 1881 1882 1883 1884 1885 1886 1887 1888 1889
- 1890s: 1890 1891 1892 1893 1894 1895 1896 1897 1898 1899

== 20th century ==
- 1900s: 1900 1901 1902 1903 1904 1905 1906 1907 1908 1909
- 1910s: 1910 1911 1912 1913 1914 1915 1916 1917 1918 1919
- 1920s: 1920 1921 1922 1923 1924 1925 1926 1927 1928 1929
- 1930s: 1930 1931 1932 1933 1934 1935 1936 1937 1938 1939
- 1940s: 1940 1941 1942 1943 1944 1945 1946 1947 1948 1949
- 1950s: 1950 1951 1952 1953 1954 1955 1956 1957 1958 1959
- 1960s: 1960 1961 1962 1963 1964 1965 1966 1967 1968 1969
- 1970s: 1970 1971 1972 1973 1974 1975 1976 1977 1978 1979
- 1980s: 1980 1981 1982 1983 1984 1985 1986 1987 1988 1989
- 1990s: 1990 1991 1992 1993 1994 1995 1996 1997 1998 1999

== 21st century ==
- 2000s: 2000 2001 2002 2003 2004 2005 2006 2007 2008 2009
- 2010s: 2010 2011 2012 2013 2014 2015 2016 2017 2018 2019
- 2020s: 2020 2021 2022 2023 2024 2025 2026 2027 2028 2029

== See also ==
- Timeline of Mexican history
