= Mexican presidential expenses controversy =

Mexican political controversy

The Mexican presidential expenses controversy, widely dubbed Toallagate ("towelgate"), was a political scandal that occurred in Mexico in 2001 involving expenditures on the residence of President Vicente Fox. The affair caused severe embarrassment to the Fox administration and resulted in the resignations of Carlos Rojas, the head of the presidential acquisitions committee, and at least three members of Rojas's staff.

== Background ==
In June 2001, the Mexican newspaper Milenio reported that the president's office had spent around US$440,000 to redecorate two cabins in the presidential compound, Los Pinos. Among the items bought were embroidered towels at $400 apiece and a set of sheets costing at least $1,500. The spending came to light after Milenio reporters utilised Compranet, a Mexican government website established to make government procurement more transparent, to scrutinise the expenditure of the presidential office.

Milenio's report caused immediate controversy, as Fox had promised during his election campaign to run an austere government and rein in excessive spending. Fox responded by instructing Francisco Barrio, the chief government auditor, to investigate the expenditures. Barrio reported that he had found irregularities including overpricing, purchases of items that had not been ordered and improper down-payments. Journalists carrying out follow-up investigations found that business addresses listed on expenses reports were false, and that the telephone numbers of suppliers used by the government had been disconnected.

Fox acknowledged that the expenditures were of importance to all Mexicans and promised that those found responsible would be fired. He accepted the resignation of Carlos Rojas, the head of the presidential acquisitions committee and a longtime friend of the president. Three members of Rojas's staff also resigned and three more were suspended. The president sought to turn the expenses controversy to his advantage by saying the fact that his own government had put the expenditures into the public domain proved that it was committed to transparency.

Journalist Anabel Hernández of Milenio won the National Journalism Prize for her reporting on toallagate.
