= Gabriel López Zapiain =

Mexican footballer (1943–2018)

Personal information
- Date of birth: 22 April 1943
- Place of birth: Irapuato, Mexico
- Date of death: 18 August 2018 (aged 75)
- Position: Defender

Senior career*
Years	Team	Apps	(Gls)
1964–1971	Irapuato		
1971–1982	Guadalajara		

International career
1971	Mexico	1	(0)
- * Club domestic league appearances and goals

Gabriel López Zapiain (22 April 1943 – 18 August 2018) was a Mexican footballer who played as a defender.

== Career ==
Born in Irapuato, López Zapiain played for Irapuato and Guadalajara.

He earned one international cap for Mexico in 1971.

He later worked for Guadalajara as a coach and scout.
