= Armando Salgado =

Mexican photographer and photojournalist (1938–2018)

- Born: Armando Lenin Salgado Salgado; 12 March 1938; Iguala, Guerrero, Mexico
- Died: 14 April 2018 (aged 80); Cuernavaca, Morelos, Mexico
- Occupation(s): Photographer; Photojournalist
- Years active: 1987–2018

Armando Lenin Salgado Salgado (12 March 1938 – 14 April 2018) was a Mexican photographer and photojournalist who documented the social movements of the twentieth century in Mexico. He is the author of the most widespread images of the Corpus Christi massacre and the guerrillero Genaro Vázquez.

Began in the 60s photographing, in the Colombian jungle, the group Ejército de Liberación Nacional. On June 10, 1971 he photographed the Corpus Christi massacre, also called Halconazo, which led him being imprisoned and tortured for 10 days. His images were on the cover of Time magazine, Life, He died on 14 April 2018, of pancreatic cancer.
