= Martín Sánchez (boxer) =

Mexican boxer (1979–2005)

Martín Sánchez (May 3, 1979 in Mexico City – July 2, 2005 in Clark County, Nevada), a.k.a. The Fireman (Bombero in Spanish), was a Mexican super featherweight boxer. He died of the injuries sustained in a boxing fight at the Orleans Hotel and Casino in Clark County, Nevada.

Sánchez died following his 9th round knockout loss to Rustam Nugaev. Sánchez had left the ring under his own power after being examined by the ringside doctor. He was also examined in his dressing room by a second doctor. Later, after a commission inspector noticed Sánchez walking strangely, he was examined again and rushed to a local hospital where he underwent emergency surgery for a subdural hematoma. He was placed on a ventilator, but died the following morning.

His death, along with that of Leavander Johnson, led to new rule changes in Nevada boxing regulations for boxer safety.
