= La Espuela Coal Mine disaster =

2002 mining disaster in Mexico

The coal mine disaster of La Espuela, in Múzquiz Municipality, Coahuila, Mexico happened at 1:30 p.m. January 23, 2002, and caused the death of 13 miners. The disaster was caused by flooding of the shaft. Without the ability to flee, the miners drowned in minutes.

According to Dick Reavis, "The mine's operator had failed, as laws require, to map the tunnels that his men made. Their pneumatic picks struck into the flooded tunnel of an abandoned mine, and they were helpless as the water rose because the motor on the pocito's only winch - the winch that raises and lowers the bote - wouldn't come to life."
