= Juan Gómez (footballer, born 1924) =

Mexican footballer (1924-2009)

Personal information
- Full name: Juan Gómez González
- Date of birth: 26 June 1924
- Place of birth: Mexico
- Date of death: 9 May 2009 (aged 84)
- Place of death: Mexico
- Position: Midfielder

Senior career*
Years	Team	Apps	(Gls)
- Club Atlas

International career
1954	Mexico	1	(0)
- * Club domestic league appearances and goals

Juan Gómez González (26 June 1924 – 9 May 2009) was a Mexican football midfielder who played for Mexico national team (Spanish: Selección de fútbol de México) in the 1954 FIFA World Cup.

Gómez played for Club Atlas, helping the club win its only Primera División championship in 1951.
