= Alejandro Domínguez Coello =

Mexican police officer

Alejandro Domínguez Coello (1950 – June 8, 2005) was a Mexican police officer who was, for a short time, the chief of police in Nuevo Laredo, a city on the Mexican side of the United States–Mexico border.

He had volunteered for the job, which no one else wanted. On June 8, 2005, just hours after being commissioned, he was gunned down by men firing assault rifles from a Chevrolet vehicle. It was thought he was killed in a turf battle between Mexico's two main drug gangs. He was 55 years of age, and a father of 3.

In the aftermath, federal troops and police took control of the city - and fifty people were killed in gun battles.
