= Patricia Quintana =

Mexican writer and chef

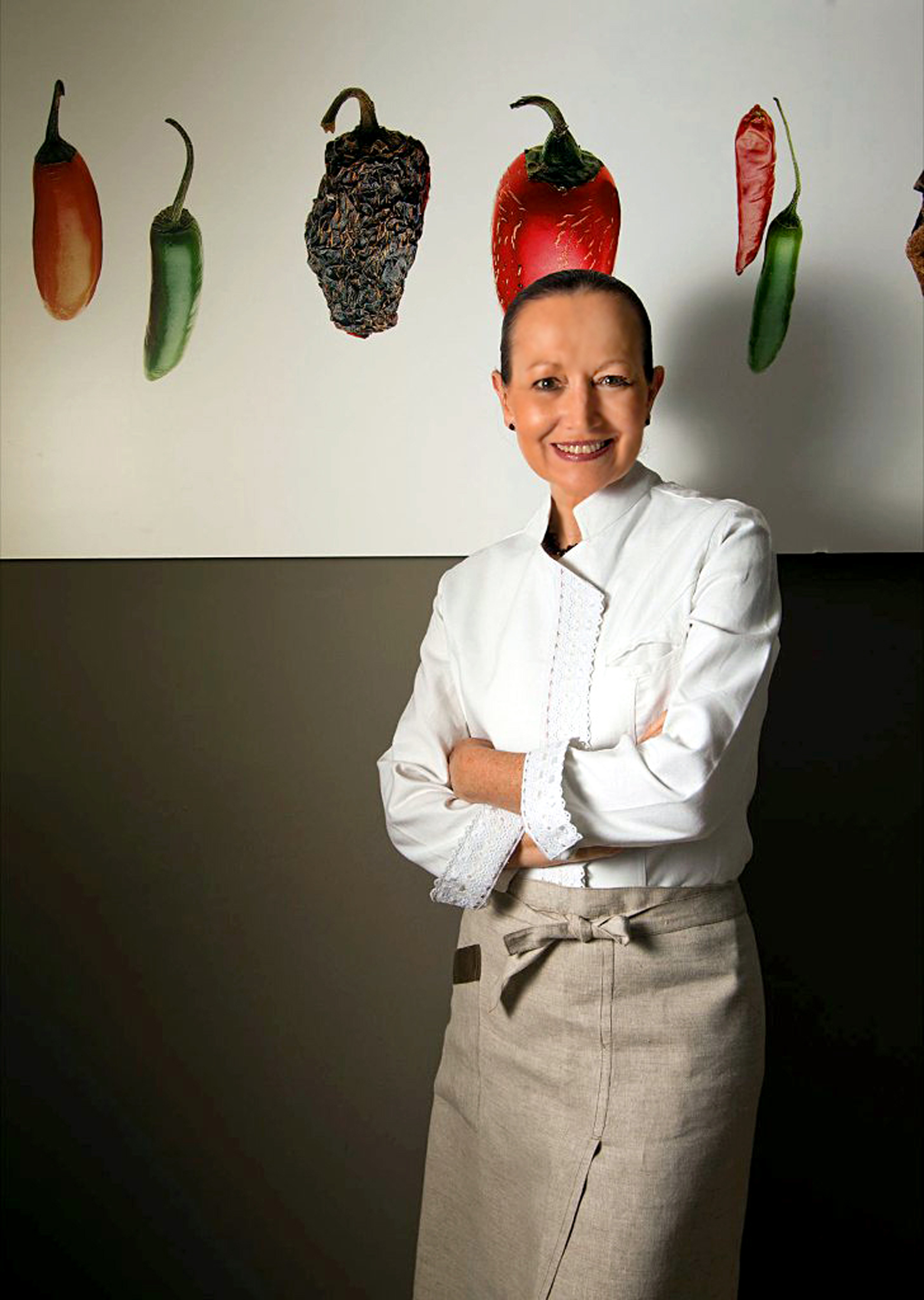
- Patricia Quintana en 2011.
- Born: Patricia Quintana Fernández; 28 October 1946; Mexico
- Died: 26 November 2018 (aged 72); Mexico
- Occupation(s): Chef, writer, businesswoman, professor
- Children: Patricio y Francisco

Patricia Quintana Fernández (28 October 1946 – 26 November 2018), was a Mexican chef, writer, businesswoman and professor. She was a recognized international cook and expert in Mexican gastronomy.

== Biography ==
Patricia Quintana was a specialist in Mexican regional cooking who was born in México and studied abroad in Canada, Switzerland and France – later returning to Mexico as a recognized chef. She studied and taught ancestral Mexican cuisine mixed with the classical cuisine. She was the owner of the restaurant Izote in City of Mexico from 2001 to the 2013, but resigned to start a banquet catering company.

She was the creator of the brand of dressings "Gavilla", a brand under which today has about 16 products. She directed the menus that were served aboard Mexican airlines.

She collaborated in many television programs and wrote articles about cuisine for several newspapers and magazines, both domestic and international.

She was the mother of Patricio Pasquel.

Patricia died at the age of 72, on 26 November 2018 of natural causes.

== Prizes and honours ==
She was a culinary ambassador of her country to the world, a distinction that awarded her to the Office of Tourism and the Association of Restaurants of Mexico.

She received the Silver Spoon Prize awarded by the magazine "Food Arts"; the Prize of the Gold Laurel by part of the Association Mexico Spain, and the Prize to Employer Restaurantero of the Year, delivered by the CANIRAC in Mexico.

== Books ==
She wrote more than twenty-five books that are references for gastronomic Mexicans. She traveled through every region of Mexico doing research for her books.

Year	Title	ISBN	Publishing	Others
	The kitchen is game	superventas
1992	It populates	968499933X
2002	The sabro of Mexico	9681840364
	The kitchen of the gods of the water
2005	The Mulli	9707770953	Group Ocean
	Dust of Jade	9709455702	PQ Editions
	Practical kitchen
	The best of Patricia Quintana
	Parties of the life
	Kitchen gone and turn
	The feast of the Mictlán
	Cymbal City of Mexico
	The big book of the antojitos Mexican
