= Gumercindo España Olivares =

Mexican artisan (1935–2018)

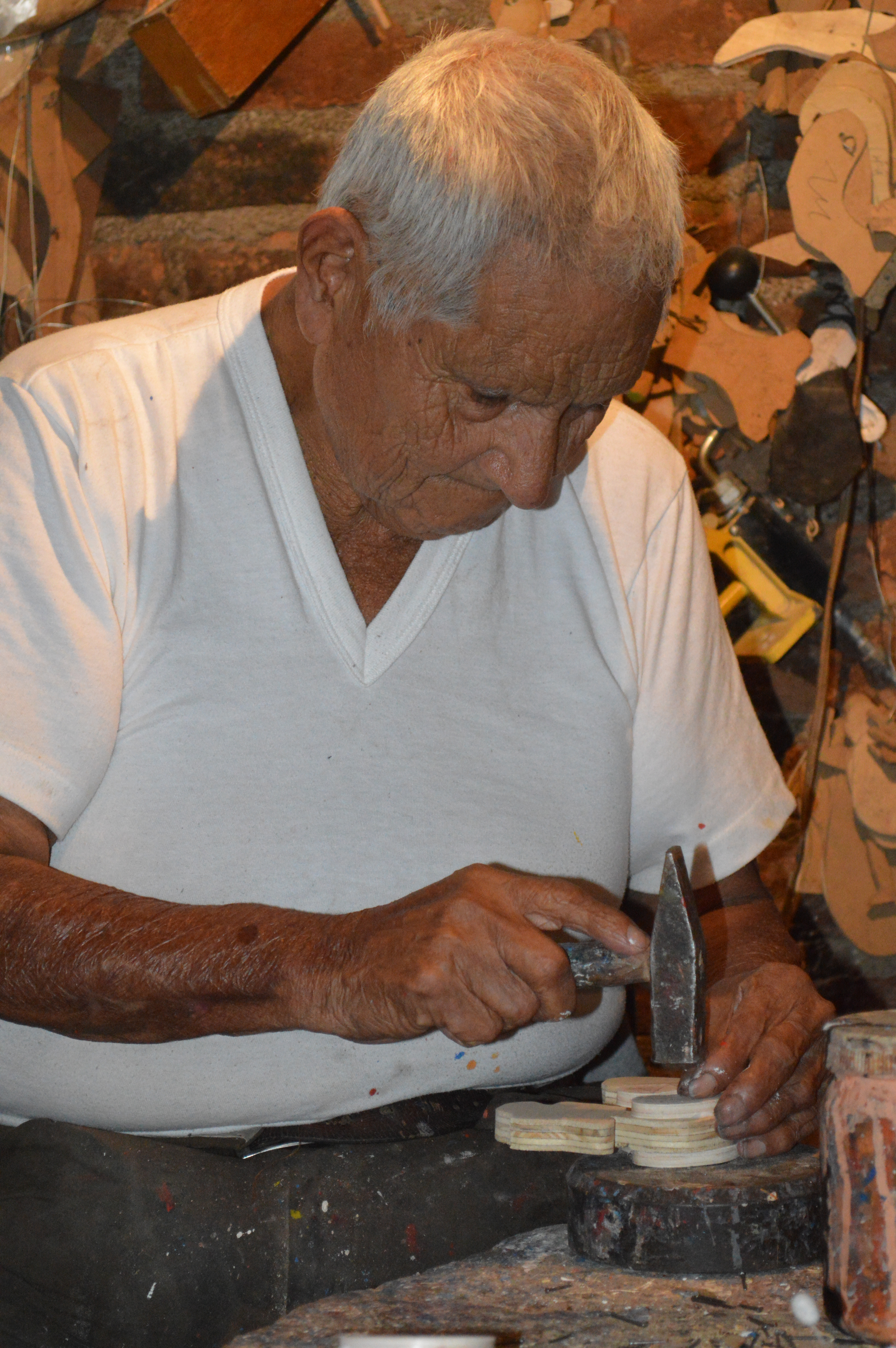
Don Sshinda in his workshop in 2016

Gumercindo España Olivares (13 January 1935 – 17 February 2018) was a Mexican artisan who specialized in traditional toys hand carved from wood. He was from a family of toymakers, beginning with his grandfather, which started in clay but switched to wood. In addition to making traditional toys, the artisan also experimented with new designs, such as those related to the history of Guanajuato. His efforts have won him various awards.

== Life ==
España Olivares was from Santa Cruz de Juventino Rosas, Guanajuato. He learned toy and mask making from his father and grandfather. The family starting in the business by copying old ceramics toys called “negros” (black) due to their color, opening a workshop called “La puerta vieja.” His grandfather traveled on foot as far as Michoacán and San Luis Potosí to sell toys as there was no motorized transportation at that time.

Popularly known as Sshinda or Chinda, the artisan continued this tradition, with his own workshop located behind his house. He had a large family which works in some way with the family business even though most have other jobs. This included his wife, children and grandchildren.

España Olivares has also served as his town's historian, with wide knowledge of herbs and his geographic region, much of it learned from his grandfather. He died at the age of 83 on 17 February 2018.

== Toy production ==
Although he began with clay, most of España Olivares’ toy production was made of wood, particularly a wood called copalillo, brought from a nearby mountain. Most toys were made from one piece of wood, unless there are movable parts such as heads, arms and legs. Finished toys were painted with commercial enamel paint.

The kinds of toys that he made varied by season and the holidays coming up, with an eye towards selling in the markets and fairs. Figures included boxers, riders on horseback, clowns, bullfighters and animals, especially birds. They also included items such as carrousels and multi-pieces sets to depict scenes such as bullfights, wrestling matches and even funerals. One very traditional toy were hens and doves whose heads and tails move when a ball attached to strings extending underneath is swung.

The artisan experimented with new designs and themes such as those related to Guanajuato's history, such as the story of Pipila. The artisan believed that in order to make good toys, one had to have a good disposition. If one is angry, toys come out ugly. He also believed the toys have a life of their own as they were made to make people laugh.

His work has earned him recognition including the Cigarrera La Moderna and the Premio Fomento Cultural Banamex in 1996, support from the Programa de Apoyo a las Culturas Municipales y Comunitarias in 2001 and the Galardón Nacional from the first Concurso Nacional del Juguete Popular Mexicano sponsored by Museo del Juguete Popular Mexicano “La Esquina” in San Miguel de Allende and FONART.
