= Humberto Briseño Sierra =

Mexican lawyer

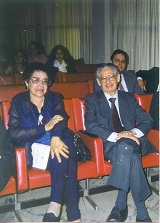
Humberto Briseño Sierra and Maria Teresa Garcia Carrillo Garcia de Alba at the Congress of the Pan-American Institute of Procedural Law, 1995.

Humberto Briseño Sierra (24 June 1914 - 1 November 2003) was a Mexican lawyer and academic. He graduated from the National Autonomous University of Mexico.
