= María Elena Meneses Rocha =

Mexican journalist

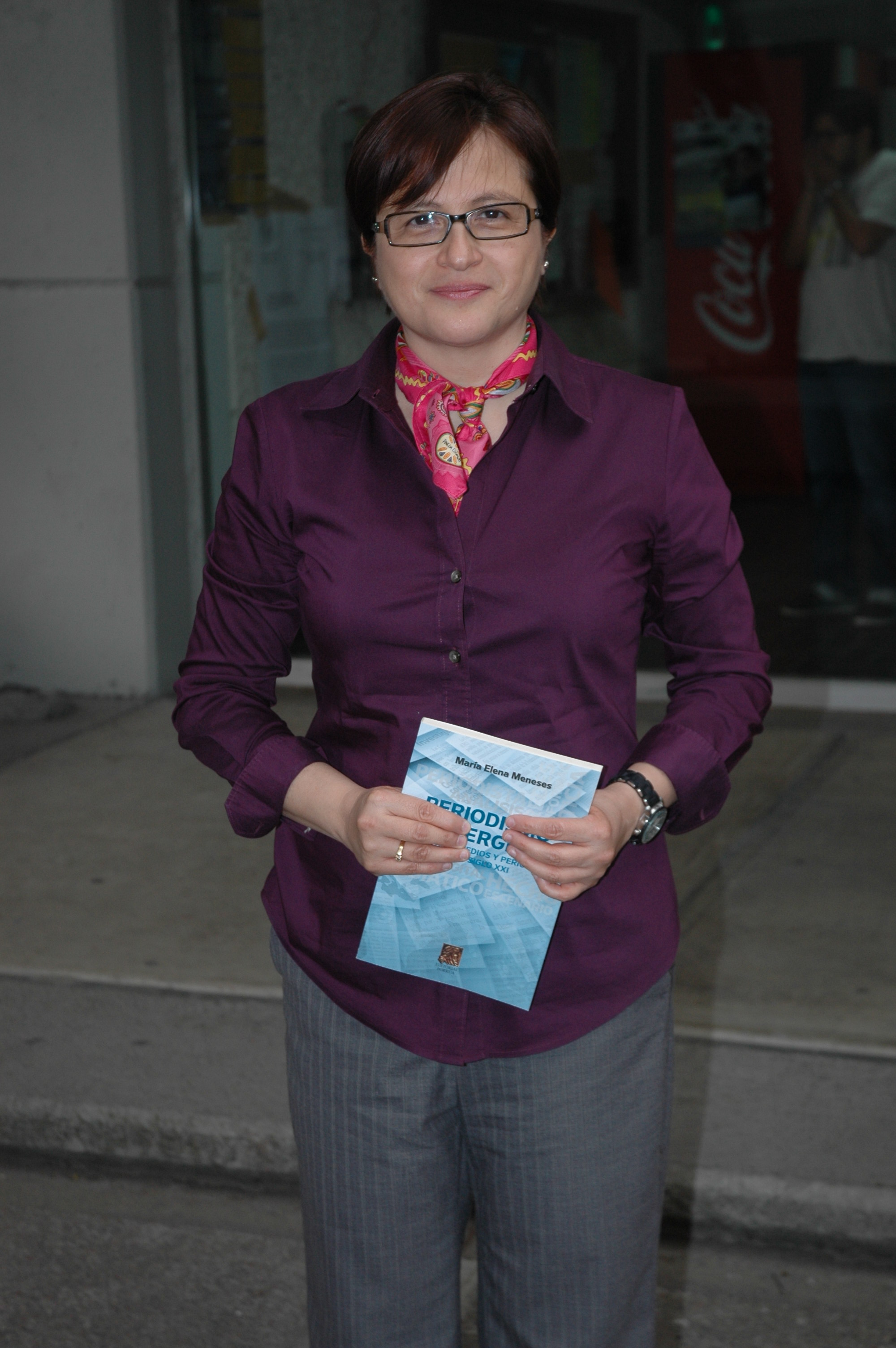
- Meneses in 2012
- Born: 1 December 1961
- Died: 14 May 2018 (aged 56)
- Known for: Journalism, research in Internet and social media
- Website: mariaelenameneses.com/

María Elena Meneses Rocha (1 December 1961 – 14 May 2018) was a Mexican journalist, professor of journalism and researcher into media, communications and the Internet with the Monterrey Institute of Technology and Higher Education, Mexico City. On the campus she taught and was the coordinator of the Cátedra Sociedad de la Información, which does research and consulting in mass media and information technology. She also worked with mass media, as a writer and as a commentator for print, broadcast and Internet media, mostly commenting on information technologies.

== Life ==
Meneses was married with two daughters and lived in Mexico City. She died from complications from surgery.

== Education ==
Menenses received her bachelor's degree in communication from the Universidad Iberoamericana and a master's degree in political science from the Universidad Nacional Autónoma de México (UNAM) and her doctorate in social and political science from UNAM.

== Journalism career ==
She began her career as a journalist. From 1984 to 1993 she was an anchor, reporter and writer with Canal 11 in Mexico, including lead anchor for the program Noticiero Enlace. From 1995 to 2001 she was a correspondent with Univision, covering political, economic and social stories on shows such as Noticiero Nacional, ¡Despierta América! and Ultima Hora. She still collaborates for entities such as CNN México, Antena Radio and El Universal She has been interviewed on social and technological topics by BBC Mundo, CNN México, TV Mórfosis of the Universidad de Guadalajara, Univisión Noticias, TV Azteca and others as a writer and as a guest commentator.

== Academic career ==
After a twenty-year career in journalism and mass media, she decided to change to academia. At the recommendation of a friend, she sent her resume to the Tec de Monterrey, Mexico City Campus in 2001 and was offered the chance to teach classes part-time. She wanted to teach but did not expect it to develop to anything more. However, in 2002 she was offered the position of director of the journalism and mass media major at the school, which she accepted despite thinking the position may only last a few years. However, in 2008, she became the coordinator of the Cátedra Sociedad de la Información, a research and consulting organization of the Tec de Monterrey. Research projects include media, the Internet, cyberculture and new technologies. Consulting is offered to government, NGOs and the information technology industry in newsrooms convergence, video journalism, broadcast journalism and electronic journalism. Her research work made her a member of the Sistema Nacional de Investigadores (Level 1).

Meneses authored two books: Periodismo Convergente. Tecnología, Medios y Periodistas en el Siglo XXI (2011) and coauthored Internet y campañas electorales en México. La oportunidad postergada with Jacob Bañuelos (2009). She has contributed chapters in books such as Perspectivas en Comunicación y Periodismo III (2013), TV Morfosis. Hacia una sociedad de Redes (2012), La sociedad de la Información en Iberoamérica. Estudio Multidisciplinar (2012), Sociedad Red en Cultura Tecnológica, Ciencia e Innovación (2012), ¿Comunicación Posmasiva? Revisando los entramados comunicacionales y los paradigmas teóricos para comprenderlos (2012), Panorama de la comunicación en México. Desafíos para la calidad y la diversidad (2010) and Perspectivas en Comunicación y Periodismo II (2009).

In addition to her work on campus, she was one of the directors of the Virtualis blog of the El Universal newspaper, which comments on technology and society, a board member at civil organizations as Center of Journalism and Public Ethics and Fundación de Periodismo de Investigación (MEPI) and the editorial board at Electronic News Journal (a peer review journal from the Association for Education in Journalism and Mass Communication. Radio and TV Division). She was a judge for the Gilberto Rincón Gallardo National Prize, and for the Premio Nacional del Periodismo (National Journalimsm Prize). In 2013, she was elected as president of the sociación Mexicana de Investigadores de la Comunicación.

She presented at conferences on topics ranging from knowledge in society, the Internet and media.

== Publications ==
- Ciberutopías. Democracia, redes sociales y movimientos (2015)
- Periodismo Convergente. Tecnología, Medios y Periodistas en el Siglo XXI (2011)

== See also ==
- List of Monterrey Institute of Technology and Higher Education faculty
