= José Sacal =

Mexican sculptor and ceramist

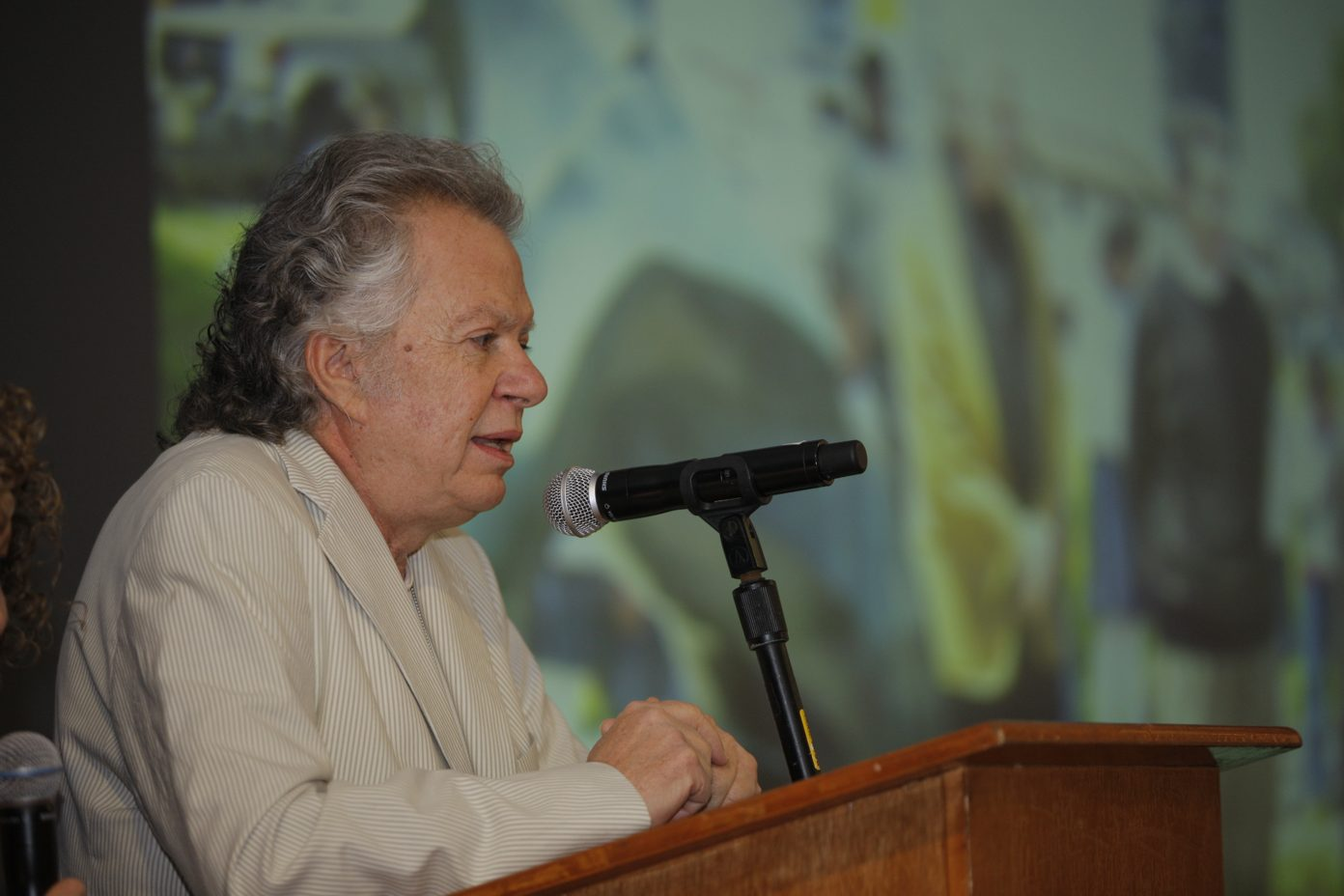
- José Sacal at World Art Vision - Cancun Mexico
- Born: September 22, 1944; Mexico
- Died: October 4, 2019 (aged 75)
- Known for: Sculpture

José Sacal Micha (25 September 1944–4 October 2018) was a Mexican sculptor and ceramist born in Cuernavaca, Morelos. His work has been interpreted as surrealistic.

== Early life ==
As a young man, Sacal studied in the Instituto Regional de Bellas Artes, del Estado de Morelos, Antiguo Molino De Sto. Dominigo, INBA, and with Arthur Khronengold and Enrique Altamirano.

== Studies ==
- 1965-69 The National Institute of Fine Arts, in Cuernavaca Morelos
- 1969-72 The Institute of Arts "La Esmeralda"
- 1973-78 Arthur Kronhnengold's Workshop
- 1979-82 The National Institute of Fine Arts, in Mexico City
- 1983-87 Enrique Altamirano's Workshop

== Exhibits ==
In 2008, the Latino Museum of History, Art and Culture in Los Angeles featured an exhibit José Sacal, Contemporary Sculpture from Mexico.

In 2011, "Personajes de impacto y corazones" in the Mexico City Metro.
