= Virginia Ramos =

American chef (1953–2018)

Virginia Ramos (1953 - September 27, 2018) was a San Francisco-based chef. She was often known by the moniker Tamale Lady.

She was born in Jalisco, Mexico in 1953. In 1980, she migrated to the United States. She started selling tamales at San Francisco bars in the early 1990s.

She would sell tamales at various San Francisco bars, including Zeitgeist and Lucky 13, though she was officially prohibited from doing so in 2013. She was considered an "icon of the city" and her death was noted by state senator Scott Wiener.

Glynn Washington of Spooked (podcast) mentioned her in a segment called, "Box of Marbles," under the episode "Boxes."
