= Adela Peralta Leppe =

Mexican actress and union activist (1929–2018)

- Born: 13 November 1929; Veracruz, Veracruz, Mexico
- Died: 22 March 2018 (aged 88); Mexico City, Mexico
- Occupation: Mexican actress

Adela Peralta Leppe (13 November 1929 – 22 March 2018), also known by her stage name Tiki Tiki, was a Mexican actress, singer, dancer, journalist, clown and union activist. Throughout her career spanning several decades, she stood out as one of the pioneering female clowns in Mexico, while also actively advocating for labour rights within her profession.

== Career ==
Adela Peralta Leppe began her career in 1948 when she joined the artistic company "México Lindo" in Acapulco, and then toured Mexico and Central America with them. She later formed her own ballet company called "Las Leppe Sisters", which performed alongside artists such as Damaso Pérez Prado and Bill Haley & His Comets in Mexico and in Europe. The composer Luis Arcaraz composed the song "Dulce" specifically for her company to perform.

In the 1950s, Peralta Leppe began visiting primary schools to provide entertainment, as many families couldn't afford to hire a clown privately. The singer and composer Daniel Santos gave her the nickname Tiki Tiki, a name she adopted for her six-decade-long career as a clown. She affirmed: "Tiki Tiki was born as a result of my social work." Her dedication to this role earned her the title of "Senior Clown" by the Latin Clown Brotherhood.

In addition to her acting career, she actively promoted labour rights within her industry. She was voted a union delegate and was a lifelong member of the National Association of Actors (ANDA) – specifically, the “Tent, Circus, and Children's Parties" section of the union. Alongside Dolores del Río, she was an ardent campaigner for the construction of childcare centres for women affiliated with the ANDA.

== Personal life ==
Peralta Leppe was a world champion angler, having won the 1956 International Tarpon Fishing Tournament in Tampico. She caught a 76 kg (168 lb) Atlantic tarpon measuring 3 meters, the largest caught by a woman.

Peralta Leppe was a victim of the 2017 Mexico City earthquake when the building where she lived collapsed. She remained trapped for 30 hours until being rescued and was hospitalized for several months as a result. She died on 22 March 2018, in Mexico City.
