= Olga Harmony =

Mexican playwright and drama teacher (1928–2018)

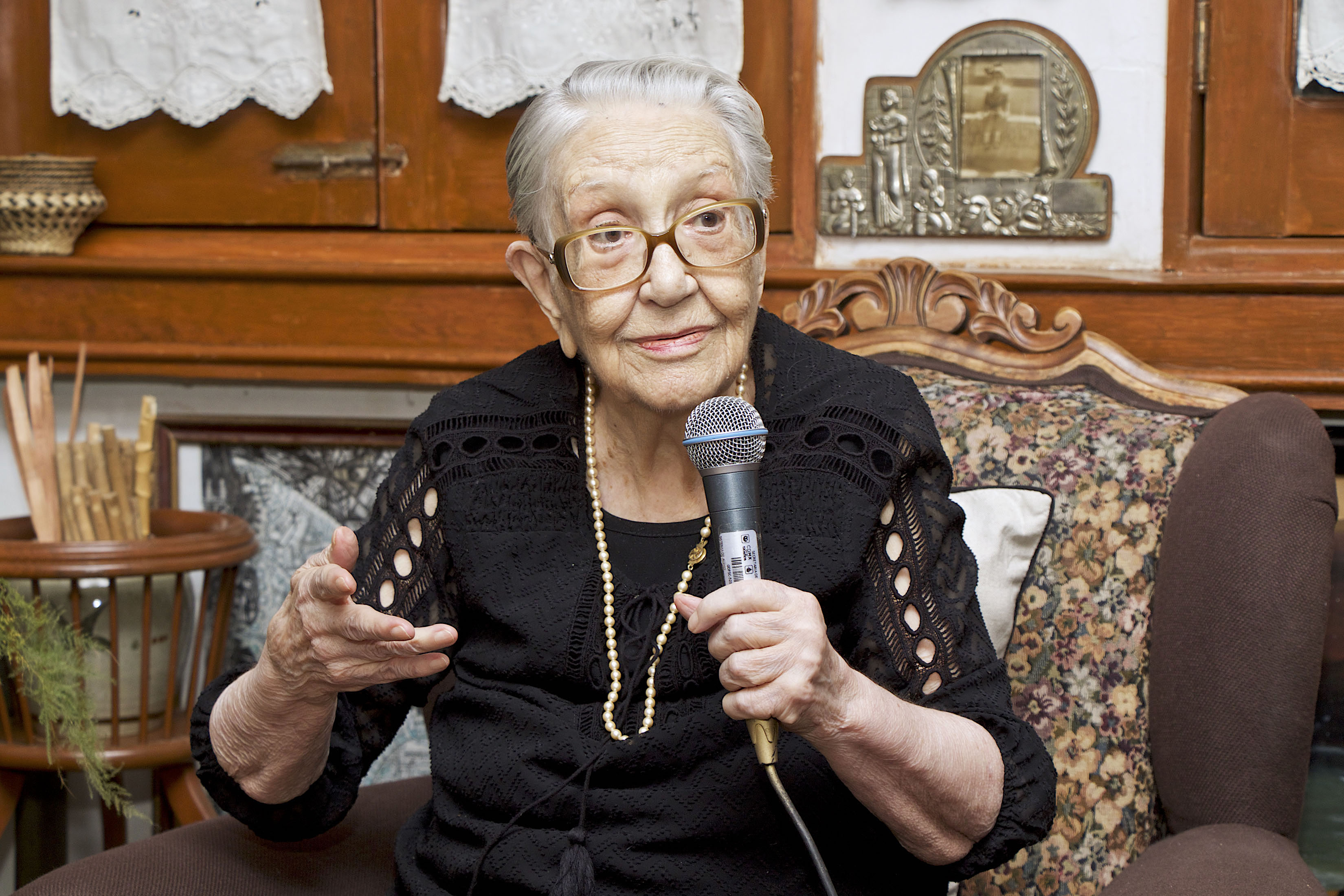
- Born: April 23, 1928; Mexico City, Mexico
- Died: November 11, 2018 (aged 90); Mexico City, Mexico
- Education: National Autonomous University of Mexico
- Occupation: Playwright

Olga Harmony (April 23, 1928 – November 11, 2018) was a Mexican playwright and a drama teacher at the Escuela Nacional Preparatoria.
