= Leticia Navarro =

Mexican entrepreneur (born 1953)

Bertha Leticia Navarro Ochoa (Note: In this Hispanic American name, the first or paternal surname is Navarro and the second or maternal family name is Ochoa.) (born November 10, 1953) is a Mexican entrepreneur who served as Secretary of Tourism in the cabinet of President Vicente Fox.

Navarro was born in Colima, Colima, on November 10, 1953. She holds a bachelor's degree in administration from the National Autonomous University of Mexico (UNAM) and has pursued graduate studies at the Simmons College in Boston, United States. She has occupied high ranking positions in the Gillette company and served as president of JAFRA Cosmetics.

On December 1, 2000, Vicente Fox designated her as Secretary of Tourism, and she served in that post until July 29, 2003. She was succeeded by Rodolfo Elizondo Torres.

Preceded by Óscar Espinosa Villarreal	Secretary of Tourism; 2000–2003	Succeeded by Rodolfo Elizondo Torres
