= Adalberto Tejeda Olivares =

Mexican politician (1883–1960)

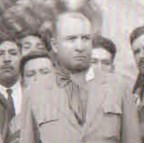
General Adalberto Tejeda.

Sixto Adalberto Tejeda Olivares (28 March 1883 – 8 September 1960) was a Mexican politician, who served two terms (1920–1924 and 1928–1932) as Governor of Veracruz. He was born in Chicontepec de Tejeda, Veracruz.

During the Mexican Revolution, Tejeda obtained the rank of lieutenant colonel. In 1918, he was elected Senator.

Tejeda was also a diplomat. He served as the Mexican Ambassador to France (1935-1937), Spain (1937-1939), and Peru (1942). He was also promulgator of 197 Law or "Tejeda Law", based in Calles Law.
