= Víctor Manuel Tinoco Rubí =

Mexican politician

Víctor Manuel Tinoco Rubí is a Mexican politician, member of Institutional Revolutionary Party, and Governor of Michoacán from 1996 to 2002.

Víctor Manuel Tinoco was elected Senator from Michoacán for LV and LVI Legislatures from 1991 to 1997, but in 1995 he left to the position and he was nominated as candidate of PRI for Governor of Michoacán, the elections of that year were extremely competed, facing candidates Cristóbal Arias Solís of the PRD and Felipe Calderón of the PAN, Michoacán came from a conflicting election in 1992 when the candidate who officially gained the victory, Eduardo Villaseñor Peña of the PRI, had had to resign two weeks after assuming the position before the protests of Arias PRD members who demanded the victory for Cristóbal, finally Tinoco obtained a triumph of approximately five percentage points over Arias, whom nevertheless defeat recognized never, protesting again electoral fraud.

== See also ==
- Governor of Michoacán

Preceded by Ausencio Chávez Hernández	Governor of Michoacán; 1996-2002	Succeeded by Lázaro Cárdenas Batel
