= Ignacio Mendoza =

Mexican sports shooter (1908–2004)

Personal information
- Full name: Ignacio Mendoza Franco
- Born: 6 June 1908 Mexico City, Mexico
- Died: 26 May 2004 (aged 95) Mexico City, Mexico

Sport
- Sport: Sports shooting

Ignacio Mendoza Franco (Note: In this Mexican name, the surname is Mendoza and the second or maternal family name is Franco.) (6 June 1908 – 26 May 2004) was a Mexican sports shooter. He competed in the 50 metre pistol event at the 1960 Summer Olympics.
