= Timeline of Mexican history =

This is a timeline of Mexican history, comprising important legal and territorial changes and political events and improvements in Mexico and its predecessor states. To read about the background to these events, see history See also the list of heads of state of Mexico and list of years in Mexico.

== 16th century ==
Year	Date	Event
1520	20 May	Massacre in the Great Temple: Spanish soldiers killed a group of Aztec nobles in the Templo Mayor in Tenochtitlan during the celebration of Toxcatl.
1520	29 June	Spanish conquest of the Aztec Empire: Moctezuma II, the tlatoani of Tenochtitlan and ruler of the Aztec Triple Alliance, was killed.
1520	30 June	La Noche Triste: The Spaniard Hernán Cortés lost several hundred men in a fighting escape from Tenochtitlan.
1520	7 July	Battle of Otumba: Combined Spanish and Tlaxcala forces seriously defeated a vastly superior Aztec force at Otumba de Gómez Farías.
1521	13 August	Fall of Tenochtitlan: Tenochtitlan was taken by Spanish forces. The tlatoani Cuauhtémoc was taken prisoner.

== 18th century ==
Year	Date	Event
1713	11 April	War of the Spanish Succession: The Treaty of Utrecht was signed, under which Great Britain, Savoy, Portugal, and the United Provinces recognized Philip V of Spain of the House of Bourbon as king of Spain, ending the war. In exchange, Philip renounced the right to pass the throne to his heirs.
1724	15 January	Philip abdicated in favor of his son Louis I of Spain.
1724	31 August	Louis died of smallpox.
1767	June	The Society of Jesus was expelled from New Spain.
1776		The autonomous Commandancy General of the Provincias Internas was established under Teodoro de Croix in the northern provinces of New Spain.

== 19th century ==
Year	Date	Event	Image
1810	16 September	Grito de Dolores: The Catholic priest Miguel Hidalgo y Costilla encouraged his congregation to revolt against the Spanish crown in a speech made at Dolores.	
1810	28 September	Mexican War of Independence: After Hidalgo orders Juan Antonio Riaño the surrender of Guanajuato, the insurgent troops led by José Mariano Abasolo and Ignacio Camargo take the city.	
1810	30 October	Battle of Monte de las Cruces: Insurgent forces under Hidalgo and Ignacio Allende defeated Spanish troops at Ocoyoacac.	
1811	10 February	Miguel Hidalgo and Ignacio Allende arrive in Zacatecas.	Timeline of Mexican history is located in North America
1811	28 February	From Guadalajara, José de la Cruz offers Miguel Hidalgo pardon, according to the amnesty decreed by the Cortes.	Timeline of Mexican history is located in North America
1811	1 March	Near Saltillo, Ignacio Allende and Miguel Hidalgo reject the pardon.; In San Antonio Béjar, José Manuel Zambrano recovers the city and Texas for the royalists.	Timeline of Mexican history is located in North America
1811	10 March	Miguel Hidalgo, Ignacio Aldama, José Mariano Abasolo, and Ignacio Allende arrive in Saltillo.	Timeline of Mexican history is located in North America
1811	21 March	The insurgent caudillos Miguel Hidalgo, Ignacio Allende, José Mariano Jiménez, José Mariano Abasolo and Ignacio Aldama are captured by Ignacio Elizondo at the Wells of Baján and taken prisoner to Monclova and Chihuahua. The son of Ignacio Allende dies at the site of the capture.	
1811	26 June	In Chihuahua, Ignacio Allende, Ignacio Aldama and José Mariano Jiménez are executed by a firing squad and decapitated. José Mariano Abasolo is sentenced to life imprisonment.	Timeline of Mexican history is located in North America
1811	11 July	From Zitácuaro, Ignacio López Rayón proposes to José María Morelos the formation of a governmental board.	Timeline of Mexican history is located in North America
1811	30 July	Miguel Hidalgo is executed by a firing squad and beheaded in Chihuahua.	Timeline of Mexican history is located in North America
1813	14 September	The Congress of Chilpancingo is inaugurated. Morelos delivers the inaugural speech and Juan Nepomuceno Rosáins reads the Sentimientos de la Nación.	Congress of Chilpancingo
1815	27 November	The Inquisition declares Morelos a heretic and sentences him to life imprisonment in Africa if he is not sentenced to the death penalty. The ecclesiastical degradation of Morelos is carried out in the chapel of the Holy Office.	Degradation of Morelos
1815	22 December	José María Morelos is executed by a firing squad in San Cristóbal de Ecatepec.	Execution of Morelos
1816	30 January	Pope Pius VII publishes the encyclical Esti Longissimo Terrarum, where he exhorts obedience and peace from the rebels in Spanish America, favoring Ferdinand VII.	Pope Pius VII
1821	21 February	Mexican War of Independence: The Spanish colonel Agustín de Iturbide and the insurgent leader Vicente Guerrero together issued the Plan of Iguala at a meeting in Iguala, under which Mexico was to become an independent, Catholic constitutional monarchy.	
1821	24 February	Mexican War of Independence: The armies under Iturbide and Guerrero were consolidated into Iturbide's control in the Army of the Three Guarantees.	
1821	24 August	Mexican War of Independence: Iturbide and Spanish viceroy Juan O'Donojú signed the Treaty of Córdoba, recognizing the independence of Mexico in personal union with Spain.	
1836	10 February	General Santa Anna, commanding the battalions of Matamoros, Jiménez, San Luis, the regiment of Dolores and eight pieces of artillery, occupies San Antonio Béjar The rebels retreat to the fort of El Álamo.	Timeline of Mexican history is located in North America
1836	6 March	After 12 days of siege, the Mexican army assaults the El Álamo. The rebel defenders ultimately surrender. Rebels forge the phrase "Remember the Alamo".	Battle of the Alamo
1836	26 March	General Urrea abides by Santa Anna's order of executing the prisoners of Goliad under the charge of treason.	Timeline of Mexican history is located in North America
1836	7 April	Santa Anna arrives in San Felipe Austin and finds the city abandoned and burned by the Texans. He finds out that Samuel Houston, the rebel leader, is located 10 leagues on the left bank of the Brazos River.	Timeline of Mexican history is located in North America
1836	21 April	Santa Anna's troops, stationed in a hill near the San Jacinto River receive the reinforcement of Perfecto of Cos. The enemy takes refuge in the forest and Santa Anna decides to offer rest to his troops. To his misfortune, Houston's men ambush him. The confrontation lasts for hours until the Mexican ranks disperse.	Battle of San Jacinto
1836	22 April	Santa Anna, who had fled in the fray of the previous day, is captured by Texan forces.	
1838	26 October	The remains of Agustín de Iturbide are transferred to the Metropolitan Cathedral of Mexico City in a sumptuous procession.	
1838	27 October	In the Metropolitan Cathedral of Mexico City, the funeral honors and the burial of the remains of Agustín de Iturbide take place.	
1846	25 April	The Thornton Affair is the first clash of the Mexican–American War as 80 cavalrymen under the command of U.S. Captain Seth B. Thornton are attacked by 1600 men under the leadership of Mexican General Anastasio Torrejón in the Nueces Strip between the Nueces River and the Rio Grande.	
1846	13 May	The U.S. Congress declares war against Mexico.	
1846	14 May	The United States begins the Blockade of Veracruz.	
1847	22/23 February	The Battle of Buena Vista takes place. The Mexican army is superior in number, but it found poorly armed and exhausted by the march and severity of the weather; For its part, the US military is smaller, but is better organized and has more artillery. The result is indecisive.	Battle of Buena Vista
1847	23 February	During the night, Santa Anna orders the withdrawal of his troops from the battlefield for his focus on the hacienda of Agua Nueva.	Timeline of Mexican history is located in North America
1847	27 February	The Mexican army under Santa Anna undertakes a forced march to San Luis Potosí, arriving on 12 March.; In Mexico City, the Rebellion of the Polkos breaks out against the sale of ecclesiastical property, the opposition to the government of Gómez Farías, and the intention to take Santa Anna to the Presidency.	Timeline of Mexican history is located in North America
1847	20 August	Regular Mexican troops and Saint Patrick's Battalion under Manuel Rincón hold a fortified monastery against Winfield Scott.	
1847	12/13 September	General Scott assaults Chapultepec Castle. Los Niños Héroes (six cadets between 12 and 18 years old who died in defense of the military academy) pass into legend. Some captured San Patricios members executed during the battle.	
1847	15 September	After several days of fierce fighting, Mexico City falls.	
1847	27 September	The Mexican government moves to Toluca. President Peña calls on the governors and deputies to meet in Querétaro.	Timeline of Mexican history is located in North America
1847	13 October	In the city of Querétaro, the executive power is established under General Peña y Peña.	Timeline of Mexican history is located in North America
1848	2 February	The Treaty of Guadalupe Hidalgo, ending the Mexican–American War is signed in Mexico City. The U.S. agrees to pay US$15 million to Mexico and to pay off the claims of American citizens against Mexico. It gave the United States the Rio Grande as a boundary for Texas, and gave the U.S. ownership of Alta California and a large area comprising roughly half of New Mexico, most of Arizona, Nevada, and Utah, and parts of Wyoming and Colorado.	
1848	4 July	The Treaty of Guadalupe Hidalgo goes into effect.	
1854	1 March	The Plan de Ayutla is proclaimed, setting off a 19-month revolt against Antonio López de Santa Anna known as the Revolution of Ayutla, leading to La Reforma (The Reform) and the Constitution of 1857.	
1855		The Reform laws begin, separating the Catholic Church and the government of Mexico. Principal leaders were Juan Álvarez, Ignacio Comonfort, Benito Juárez, and Sebastián Lerdo de Tejada.	
1855	4 October	Juan Álvarez takes office as Interim President of Mexico in Cuernavaca.	
1857	5 February	The Federal Constitution of the United Mexican States of 1857 goes into effect.	
1857	17 December	The Reform War begins when the Plan of Tacubaya is proclaimed and conservative General Félix María Zuloaga ousts president Ignacio Comonfort.	
1858	15 January	Benito Juarez becomes president and he moves to Veracruz.	
1861	1 January	Juarez recaptures Mexico City and goes on to defeat the Conservatives. He is elected president in his own right in March.	
1861	31 October	France, Great Britain, and Spain agree to the Convention of London, a joint effort to extract loan repayments from Mexico, which President Juarez had frozen three months earlier.	
1861	8 December	France, Spain, and Great Britain disembark in Veracruz. Spain and Britain later withdraw.	
1862	5 May	The Mexican Army under General Ignacio Zaragoza defeats the invading French army led by General Charles de Lorencez in the Battle of Puebla. French forces took the city a year later, after the Siege of Puebla (1863).	
1863	10 July	The Second Mexican Empire is declared, with the support of French Emperor Napoleon III, as well as the Austrian and Belgian crowns. The Empire came to an end on 19 June 1867, with the execution of Emperor Maximilian I.	
1864	10 June	Fernando Maximiliano José María de Habsburgo-Lorena, Archduke of Austria, was offered the Mexican crown in October, 1863, which he accepted on 10 April. He and his wife, Charlotte of Belgium arrived in Veracruz on 29 May 1864, and they soon established their official residence at Chapultepec Castle in Mexico City.	
1867	19 June	Napoleon III withdrew his army from Mexico in 1866, and Juarez's liberal forces captured Mexico City on 15 May 1867. Maximilian was captured the next day, and following a trial, he was sentenced to death. Maximilian, General Miguel Miramón, and General Tomás Mejía Camacho were executed by firing squad in Cerro de las Campanas, Querétaro City at 6:40am on the morning of 19 June 1867.	

== 20th century ==
Year	Date	Event
1910	20 November	Mexican Revolution: Francisco I. Madero calls for armed rebellion against the government of President Porfirio Díaz.
1917	5 February	Mexican Revolution: The current constitution of Mexico was approved by a constituent assembly in Querétaro.
1920	3 January	An earthquake of magnitude 7.8 hits Puebla and Veracruz, leaving 648–4,000 dead.
1938	18 March	Mexican oil expropriation: President Lázaro Cárdenas expropriates the oil industry.
1960	21 September	President Adolfo López Mateos nationalized the electrical system.
1968	2 October	Tlatelolco massacre: The government fired on a crowd of student protesters in the Plaza de las Tres Culturas in Mexico City, killing between thirty and three hundred.
1973	28 August	An earthquake of magnitude 7.5 hits Puebla and Veracruz, leaving 539–1,000 dead.
1982	1 September	President José López Portillo nationalizes the banking industry.
1985	19 September	1985 Mexico City earthquake: An earthquake centered off the Pacific coast of Michoacán caused ten thousand deaths and between three and four billion US$ in damage in Mexico City.
1988	6 July	1988 Mexican general election: Carlos Salinas de Gortari of the Institutional Revolutionary Party (PRI) was elected president in a rigged election, with an official 51% of the vote. The PRI maintained its majority in the Chamber of Deputies.
1989	5 May	Constituent parties of the National Democratic Front (FDN) established the Party of the Democratic Revolution (PRD) under the leadership of Cuauhtémoc Cárdenas.
1994	23 March	Luis Donaldo Colosio is assassinated during his campaign to become the Mexican president in a rally in Tijuana.

== 21st century ==
Year	Date	Event
2003	6 July	2003 Mexican legislative election: The PRI won a plurality of seats in the Chamber of Deputies.
2006	2 July	2006 Mexican general election: Felipe Calderón of the National Action Party (PAN) won the presidency with 36% of the vote. The PAN won a plurality of seats in the Chamber of Deputies.
2006	30 July	Andrés Manuel López Obrador of the PRD led hundreds of thousands in a protest against the election results at Zócalo in Mexico City.
2009	5 July	2009 Mexican legislative election: The PRI won a plurality of seats in the Chamber of Deputies.
2012	1 July	2012 Mexican general election: Enrique Pena Nieto of the PRI won the presidency with 39% of the vote. The PRI won a plurality of seats in the Chamber of Deputies.
2017	19 September	2017 Puebla earthquake: struck at 13:14 CDT on 19 September 2017 with a magnitude of Mw 7.1 and strong shaking for about 20 seconds. Its epicenter was about 55 km (34 mi) south of the city of Puebla. The earthquake caused damage in the Mexican states of Puebla and Morelos and in the Greater Mexico City area. 370 people were killed by the earthquake and related building collapses, including 228 in Mexico City, and more than 6,000 were injured. Twelve days earlier, the even larger 2017 Chiapas earthquake struck 650 km (400 mi) away, off the coast of the state of Chiapas.
2018	1 July	Andrés Manuel López Obrador of Together we will make history (a coalition of MORENA and the Labor Party) is elected 58th president with 53% of the vote. Together we will make history also won majorities in both the Senate and the Chamber of Deputies and 5 governorships.

== See also ==
- List of years in Mexico

Cities in Mexico

- Timeline of Acapulco
- Timeline of Aguascalientes city
- Timeline of Campeche city
- Timeline of Chihuahua city
- Timeline of Guadalajara
- Timeline of Guanajuato city
- Timeline of Ciudad Juárez
- Timeline of León
- Timeline of Mérida
- Timeline of Mexico City
- Timeline of Monterrey
- Timeline of Puebla city
- Timeline of Tijuana
- Timeline of Villahermosa
