= Juan Manuel Martín del Campo =

Mexican priest and exorcist (1917–1996)

Venerable Juan Manuel Martín del Campo
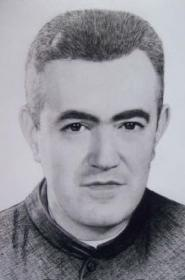
- c. 1944.

Priest
- Born: 14 December 1917; Lagos de Moreno, Jalisco, Mexico
- Died: 13 August 1996 (aged 78); Xalapa, Veracruz, Mexico
- Venerated in: Roman Catholic Church
- Attributes: Cassock; Stole
- Patronage: Exorcists

Juan Manuel Martín del Campo (14 December 1917 – 13 August 1996) was a Mexican Roman Catholic priest and exorcist. He was a student and friend of the bishop Saint Rafael Guízar Valencia and studied for the priesthood in secret during the Cristero War that plagued Mexico during the thirties. He was even dubbed as "the new Padre Pio" due to his similarities to the Italian Capuchin.

He became titled as a Servant of God under Pope Benedict XVI on 27 November 2008 once the canonization cause commenced and he was titled as Venerable on 30 September 2015 after Pope Francis confirmed that the late priest led a life of heroic virtue.

== Life ==
Juan Manuel Martín del Campo was born on 14 December 1917 to Ana Martín del Campo. His parents would lead their children in rosaries on a frequent basis and his mother would bless him before he went to sleep. His elder brother Fernando became a priest.

He studied for the priesthood in Veracruz during a period of religious persecution of the Cristero War and so attended underground classes that were conducted in secret and spent most of his time off administering to the poor and to the ill while also helping to conduct covert Masses to avoid detection. He came to the attention of the Bishop Saint Rafael Guízar Valencia who started mentoring the seminarian and also becoming a close friend. Valencia's successor, Manuel Pío López, appointed him as an acolyte (one who prepares liturgical celebrations) on 16 July 1939. He was ordained as a priest on 21 December 1940 and became both a teacher and a spiritual director while being appointed as the prefect of theologians from 1940 to April 1947 when he was made the confessor to the Sisters of Banderilla. As a popular confessor he often spent six to eight hours in the confessional with people even waiting until midnight to see him.

In 1954 he became the diocesan director of the work of the Propagation of the Faith and in 1956 became both the chaplain and the spiritual director of the Motolinía College in 1956. From 1960 until 1970 he served as the parish pastor of Saint Jerome in Coatepec and founded the "Colegio Mexico" there in Coatepec. In 1961 he served as the confessor to the Sisters of the Holy Trinity in the same town and was also the penitentiary canon of the Xalapa Cathedral from 1970 until 1985.

He served as the interim rector of the Church of the Sacred Heart in Xalapa in 1985 and served as the rector of the Church of San Isidro in Xalapa also in 1987. He became the archdiocesan exorcist in 1987 at the behest of Bishop Sergio Obeso Rivera and remained in that position until 1995 when he retired from his position.

He died on 13 August 1996 and his remains were later housed in the Church of Saint Jerome in Coatepec in 2010.

== Beatification process ==
The beatification process commenced under Pope Benedict XVI on 27 November 2008 after the Congregation for the Causes of Saints granted the "nihil obstat" ('nothing against') to the cause and titled him as a Servant of God. The diocesan process opened in the Archdiocese of Xalapa on 5 February 2009 and concluded its work not long after on 23 April 2010. The C.C.S. validated the process on 7 July 2011 in Rome.

In 2013 the postulation submitted the Positio which allowed for a group of theologians to approve its contents on 25 November 2014. The members of the C.C.S. also voted in favor of the cause on 22 September 2015. He became titled as Venerable on 30 September 2015 after Pope Francis approved his life of heroic virtue.

The current postulator assigned to this cause is Rev. Rafael González Hernández.
