= Estadio Xalapeño =

Stadium in Xalapa, Mexico

Coordinates: 19°31′11″N 96°55′08″W

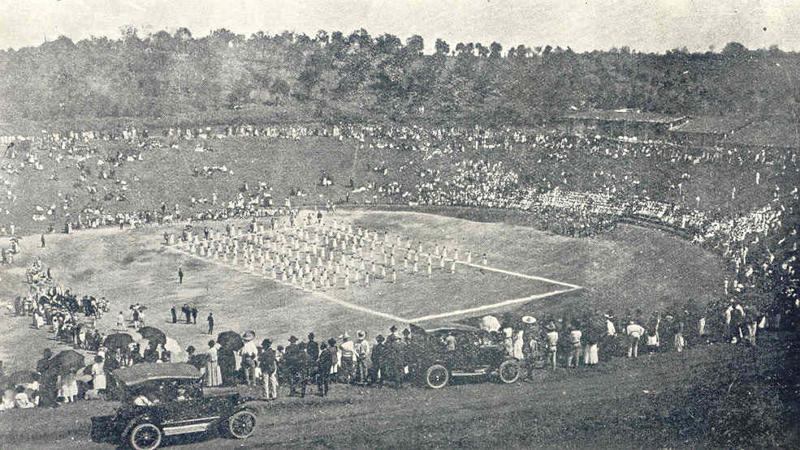
The Jalapa Stadium in 1922, Veracruz Blue Book (1923), p 181

The Stadium at Xalapa, Veracruz, ("Estadio Xalapeño") is located a few blocks south and downhill of the center of town, and can be easily seen from the terraces of Parque Juárez.

The place was identified in the 1920s by William K. Boone, then president of the local Chamber of Commerce, as a natural stadium similar to those of the classical stadiums and theaters of ancient Greece.

The site had been a mosquito-infested marshland known as the "Ciénega de Melgarejo" that was drained and filled under the direction of the Chamber of Commerce, with manpower provided by the Jalapa Railroad and Power Company (JRR&PC).

== Stadium Jalapeño (1922) ==
The Stadium Jalapeño was inaugurated with athletic games on May 5–7, 1922.

On Sunday May 7, 1922, as part of the weekend festivities, the famous pilot Frank Hawks landed within the Stadium grounds.

== Estadio Xalapeño (1925) ==
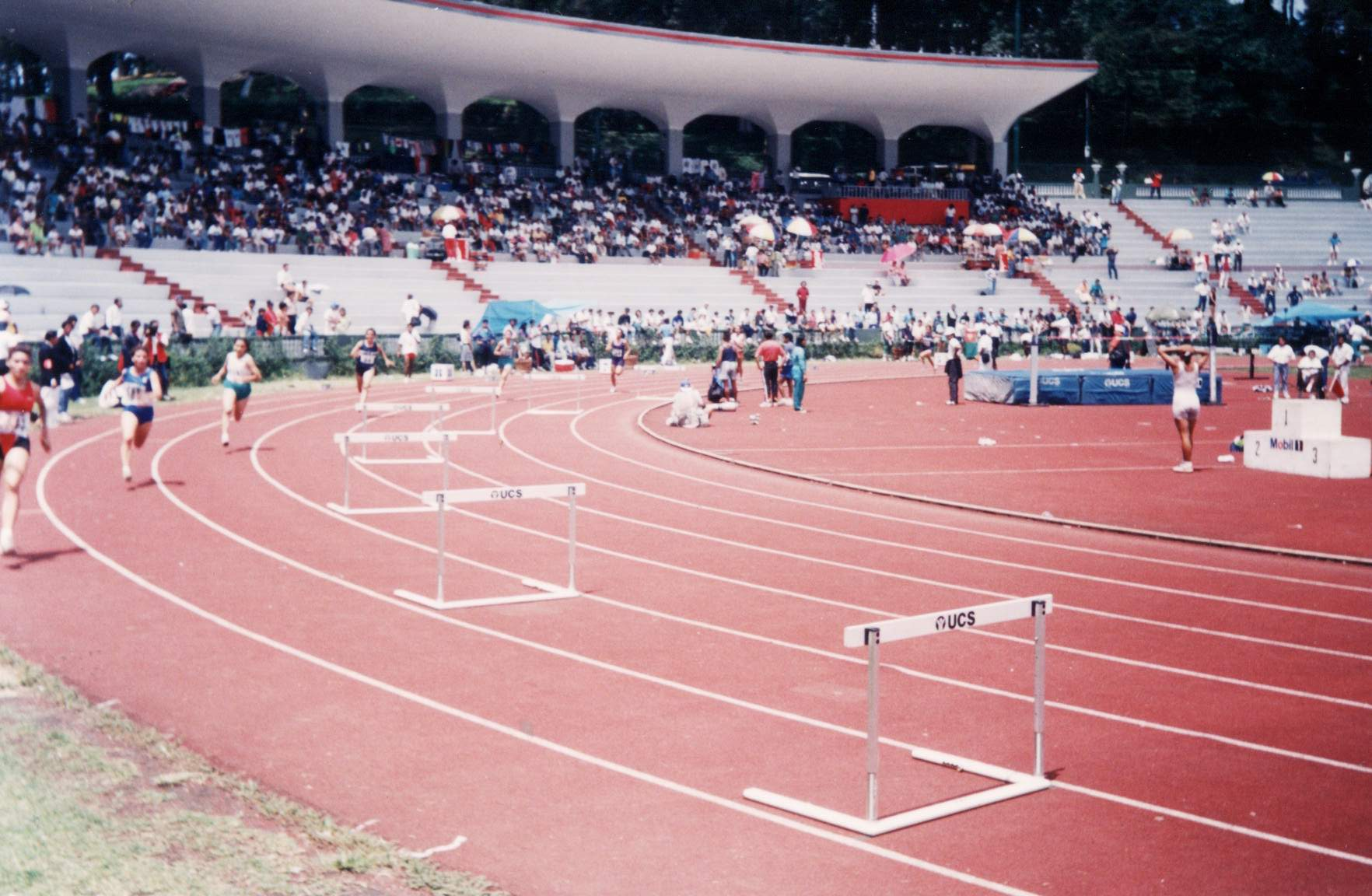
The Estadio in 1991

A few years later, the monumental stadium was built under the architectural and engineering direction of Modesto C. Rolland (Baja California Sur, 1881). It was inaugurated on September 20, 1925.

It was given the name of the revolutionary general Heriberto Jara Corona, governor of the state of Veracruz at the time.

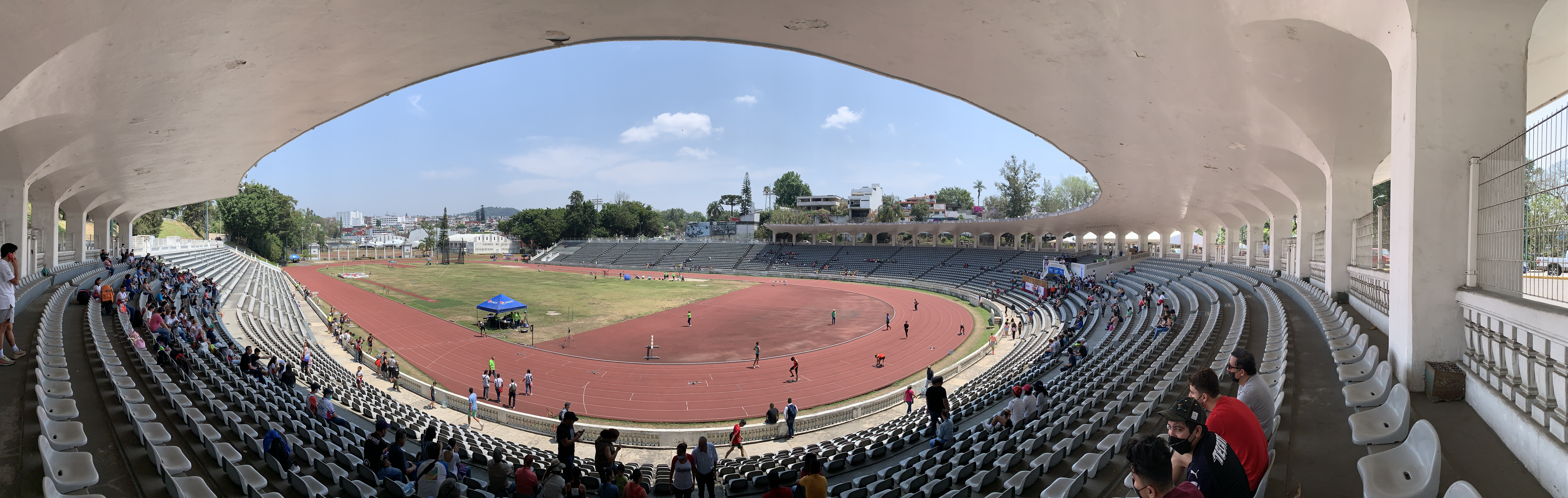
The Estadio in 2022
