= UEH =

UEH may refer to:

- University of Economics Ho Chi Minh City (Đại học Kinh tế Thành phố Hồ Chí Minh)
- University of Haiti (Université d'Etat d'Haïti)
- Universidad Euro Hispanoamericana
