= Heriberto Jara =

Heriberto Jara may refer to:

- General Heriberto Jara International Airport, or Veracruz International Airport, Mexico
- Heriberto Jara Corona, a Mexican revolutionary, naval officer and politician
