= 1888 in Mexico =

- Decades: 1860s; 1870s; 1880s; 1890s; 1900s
- See also: History of Mexico; List of years in Mexico; Timeline of Mexican history

Events from the year 1888 in Mexico.

== Incumbents ==
- President: Porfirio Díaz
- Archbishop of Mexico: Pelagio Antonio de Labastida y Dávalos

=== Governors ===
- Aguascalientes: Alejandro Vázquez del Mercado
- Campeche: José Trinidad Ferrer/Onecíforo Durán/Joaquín Kerlegand
- Chiapas: Miguel Utrilla/Manuel Carrascosa
- Chihuahua: Lauro Carrillo
- Coahuila: José María Garza Galán
- Colima: Gildardo Gómez Campero
- Durango:
- Guanajuato:
- Guerrero:
- Hidalgo: Francisco Cravioto
- Jalisco: Ramón Corona/Juan G. Robles/Pedro A. Galván
- State of Mexico:
- Michoacán: Mariano Jiménez
- Morelos: Jesús H. Preciado
- Nuevo León: Lázaro Garza Ayala
- Oaxaca:
- Puebla:
- Querétaro: Francisco González de Cosío
- San Luis Potosí: Carlos Díez Gutiérrez
- Sinaloa:
- Sonora:
- Tabasco:
- Tamaulipas: Romulo Cuellar/Alejandro Prieto Quintero
- Tlaxcala: Próspero Cahuantzi
- Veracruz: Juan de la Luz Enríquez Lara
- Yucatán: General Guillermo Palomino
- Zacatecas:

== Births ==
- May 3 – José María Robles Hurtado, Catholic priest
- June 15 – Ramón López Velarde, poet
- July 13 – Anacleto González Flores, lawyer

== Deaths ==
- date unknown: Narciso Mendoza theNiño artillero (Child Gunner) during the Siege of Cuautla in 1812 (b. 1800)
