= 1891 in Mexico =

- Decades: 1870s; 1880s; 1890s; 1900s; 1910s
- See also: History of Mexico; List of years in Mexico; Timeline of Mexican history

Events in the year 1891 in Mexico.

== Incumbents ==
- President: Porfirio Diaz

=== Governors ===
- Aguascalientes: Alejandro Vázquez del Mercado
- Campeche: Joaquín Kerlegand/Leocadio Preve
- Chiapas: Manuel Carrascosa/Emilio Rabasa
- Chihuahua: Lauro Carrillo
- Coahuila: José María Garza Galán
- Colima: Gildardo Gómez Campero
- Durango:
- Guanajuato:
- Guerrero:
- Hidalgo: Rafael Cravioto
- Jalisco:
- State of Mexico:
- Michoacán: Mariano Jiménez
- Morelos: Jesús H. Preciado
- Nuevo León: Bernardo Reyes
- Oaxaca:
- Puebla:
- Querétaro: Francisco González de Cosío
- San Luis Potosí: Carlos Díez Gutiérrez
- Sinaloa:
- Sonora:
- Tabasco:
- Tamaulipas: Alejandro Prieto Quintero
- Tlaxcala: Próspero Cahuantzi
- Veracruz: Juan de la Luz Enríquez Lara
- Yucatán: Colonel Daniel Traconis
- Zacatecas:

== Events ==
- June 23 – establishment of the Roman Catholic Archdiocese of Chihuahua, Roman Catholic Diocese of Cuernavaca, Roman Catholic Diocese of Saltillo, Roman Catholic Diocese of Tehuantepec and Roman Catholic Diocese of Tepic
- September 15 – Garza Revolution: 60-80 followers of Catarino Garza crossed the Rio Grande from Texas into Mexico. Most are Mexican-Americans recruited locally.
- September 16 – a telegram is sent from Fort Ringgold to the United States Army's Department of Texas informing of the crossing
- December 26 – The Mexican Army is attacked by Garza's followers in a raid from San Ygnacio, Texas

== Deaths ==
- February 4 – Pelagio Antonio de Labastida y Dávalos, Roman Catholic prelate and politician (b. 1816)
- December 17 – José María Iglesias, Mexican lawyer and journalist, interim president from 1876 to 1877 (b. 1823)

== See also ==
- Garza Revolution
