= Callejón =

Callejón is Spanish for "alley" or "side street", and may refer to:

== Surname ==
- Eduardo Propper de Callejón (1895–1972), Spanish diplomat who helped Jews flee from Occupied France during World War 2
- José María Callejón (born 1987), Spanish football forward
- Juanmi Callejón (born 1987), Spanish football midfielder

== Places ==
- Callejón de Conchucos, a valley in the Cordillera Blanca mountain range in the Ancash region of Peru
- Callejón de Huaylas, a valley in the Ancash Region in the north-central highlands of Peru
- Callejón Diamante (Diamond Alley), a central street in the city of Xalapa in Veracruz state, Mexico

== Other ==
- Callejon (band), a German metalcore band
