= Interbus (Xalapa) =

Interbus is a bus company operating in the city of Xalapa, Mexico. The company operates two lines of buses in the city, the Green Line and the Yellow Line.
