= Castillo River =

River in Veracruz, Mexico

Castillo River is a river of eastern Mexico. It flows through the municipality of Xalapa, in the state of Veracruz.
