= Kaná, Museo de Ciencia y Tecnología =

Museum in Xalapa, Veracruz, Mexico

- Location within Mexico
- Location: Av Rafael Murillo Vidal 1735, Col. Cuauhtemoc, CP 91069, Xalapa-Enríquez, Xalapa, Veracruz
- Coordinates: 19.518001°N 96.894154°W
- Type: Science and Technology
- Owner: Gobierno del Estado de Veracruz / Consejo Veracruzano de Inv. Científica y Des.Tecnológico
- Website: kana.gob.mx/wp/

Kaná, Museo de Ciencia y Tecnología, formerly the Museo de Ciencia y Tecnología and then the Museo Interactivo de Xalapa, is a modern interactive museum in the city of Xalapa, capital of the state of Veracruz in eastern Mexico.

== History ==
The Museo de Ciencia y Tecnología (Museum of Science and Technology) opened in 1992. It was designed to follow the same approach as the Papalote Museo del Niño. A children's museum in Mexico City, and to promote interest in scientific ideas and careers among children, The architect Francisco López-Guerra Almada designed the buildings, and Museotec, SA designed the exhibits. It has an outstanding exhibition of classic vehicles.

In 2005 it became the Museo Interactivo de Xalapa (MIX: Interactive Museum of Xalapa). The museum closed at the end of 2018 due to financial troubles, and 34 employees were laid off. It reopened in 2021.

== Rooms ==
The museum has six interactive rooms with names in the Totonac language.

- Kaniwá means "everywhere" and is the transportation room.
- Talakawasa is the technology room, which exhibits new developments in invention, design and construction.
- Katso means "knowing", and is the name of the science room, which demonstrates various physical phenomena and mathematical concepts.
- Maxqaqena is dedicated to the study of light and shows phenomena such as electric current.
- Skatan means children, and is a space where visitors between 3 months and 6 years of age can play,
- Matatena is a space that simulates a neighborhood patio and Mexican town fair, in which, through games and workshops, visitors learn how the ways of playing change over time.

The Ciudades room is made up of five areas: What is a city?, The city and its people, The city that changes, The sustainable city, and The smart city.

The museum features a planetarium with an IMAX screen, showing educational documentaries.

== Sources ==
- Corsario, Eduardo (2022), "Cultura científica para una reconstrucción social: la visión del Museo de Ciencia y Tecnología "Kaná"", Revista Cronopios y Divergencias
- Kaná, Museo de Ciencia y Tecnología, Gobierno de México, Sistema de Información Cultural
- Morales, José (2018-12-12), Cierra el Museo Interactivo de Xalapa y despiden a trabajadores (in Spanish)
- Sánchez, Maribel (4 June 2021), "El museo de tecnología y ciencia en Xalapa, ¿ya lo viste?", Diario de Xalapa (in Spanish)
