= Coapexpan River =

River of eastern Mexico

Coapexpan River is a river of eastern Mexico. It flows through the municipality of Xalapa, in the state of Veracruz.
