= Auto-Transportes Banderilla =

Mexican bus company

Auto-Transportes Banderilla is a bus company operating in the city of Xalapa, Mexico.
