= Carneros River =

River in Veracruz, Mexico

- Native name: Río Carneros (Spanish)

Location
- Country: Mexico
- State: Veracruz
- Municipality: Xalapa

Carneros River is a river of eastern Mexico. It flows through the municipality of Xalapa, in the state of Veracruz.
