= Rafael Guízar y Valencia =

Mexican bishop

Saint Rafael Guízar y Valencia
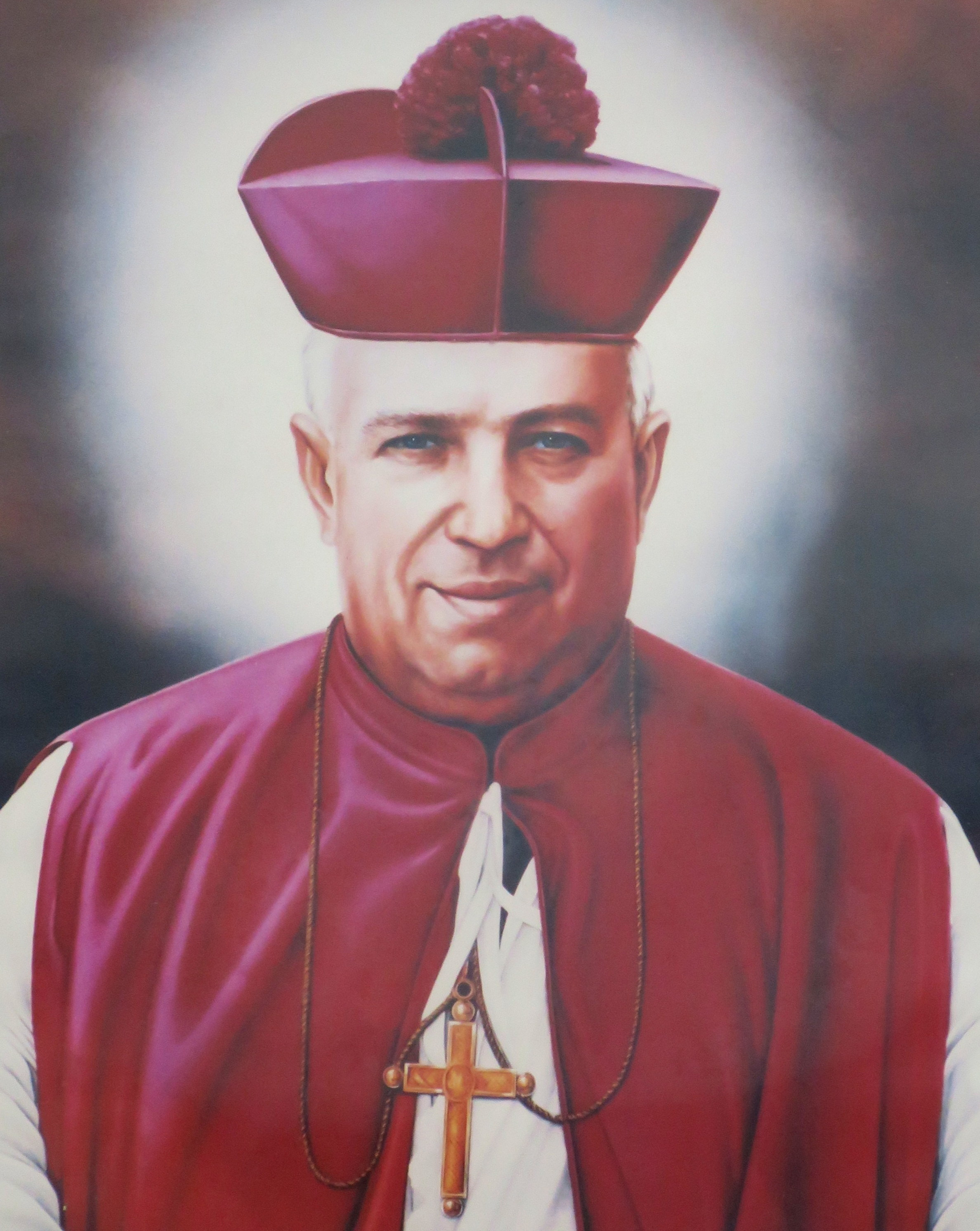
- Portrait of Rafael Guízar y Valencia

Bishop
- Born: 16 April 1878; Cotija, Michoacán, Mexico
- Died: 6 June 1938 (aged 60); Mexico City, Mexico
- Venerated in: Roman Catholic Church
- Beatified: 29 January 1995, Saint Peter's Square by Pope John Paul II
- Canonized: 15 October 2006, Saint Peter's Square by Pope Benedict XVI
- Major shrine: Xalapa Cathedral, Xalapa, Veracruz, Mexico
- Feast: 6 June

Rafael Guízar y Valencia (16 April 1878 – 6 June 1938) was a Mexican bishop of the Roman Catholic Church who was persecuted during the Mexican Revolution. Named Bishop of Xalapa in 1919, he was driven out of his diocese and forced to live the remainder of his life in hiding in Mexico City. Pope Benedict XVI canonized Guízar on 15 October 2006.

== Life ==
Rafael Guízar Valencia was born in Cotija in 1878. His parents, Prudencio and Natividad Guízar y Valencia, had eleven children. When Rafael was nine years old, he lost his mother. He attended a Catholic school where he got in touch with Jesuit priests. After some time he felt called to priesthood. In 1891 he entered the seminary in Cotija and was ordained in 1901.

In 1905 he became spiritual director of the seminary in Zamora. In 1911, he founded a religious newspaper in Mexico, but soon met with political persecution by the revolutionary movement in Mexico which lasted until his death. Guízar lived several times without a home and hid his priestly work under disguises as a street seller, a musician, and a doctor of homeopathic medicine, which allowed him to administer the sacraments in secrecy. At times he had to leave the country and lived in the South of the United States until 1915. In 1916 he went to Guatemala, and in 1919 he cared for victims of the black plague.

In 1919 he was elected Bishop of Veracruz and was consecrated in the Cathedral of Saint Christopher in Havana on November 30, 1919. He maintained a clandestine seminary in Mexico, which changed location constantly. During the time Guízar was in charge of the diocese, he had to spend nine years in exile due to persecution.

In 1920, he participated in relief and recovery efforts for survivors and towns badly affected by an earthquake which struck Veracruz in January. He collaborated with government officials to raise funds, and conducted sermons in the region.

In December 1937, while on a mission in Cordoba, he suffered a heart attack and died on 6 June 1938 in Mexico City. His tomb in the Catholic Cathedral of Xalapa attracts many worshipers who come for intercession.

He was a member of the Knights of Columbus Council 2311 of Jalapa, Veracruz.

== Veneration ==
Guízar was beatified by Pope John Paul II on 29 January 1995. In April 2006, Pope Benedict XVI confirmed a miracle that happened through Guízar's intercession that opened the way to his being canonized on 15 October 2006 by Pope Benedict XVI.

== See also ==
- Cristero War
- Saints of the Cristero War
