= El Colegio de Veracruz =

College in Xalapa, Veracruz, Mexico

Coordinates: 19.5293°N 96.9204°W

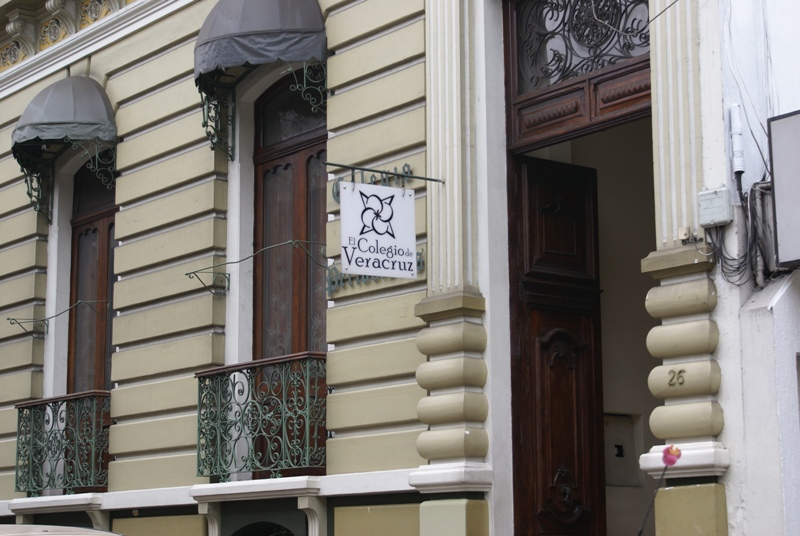
Fachada colver

The El Colegio de Veracruz (Colver) is a college in the city of Xalapa, Veracruz, Mexico.

(COLVER) is a public institution in Veracruz dedicated to higher education and research in Political Science, Public Administration, and Regional Development. It was founded in 2002 as a decentralized agency of the Veracruz State Government.

In 2011, it became a decentralized agency under the Veracruz State Department of Education.

== Foundation and History ==
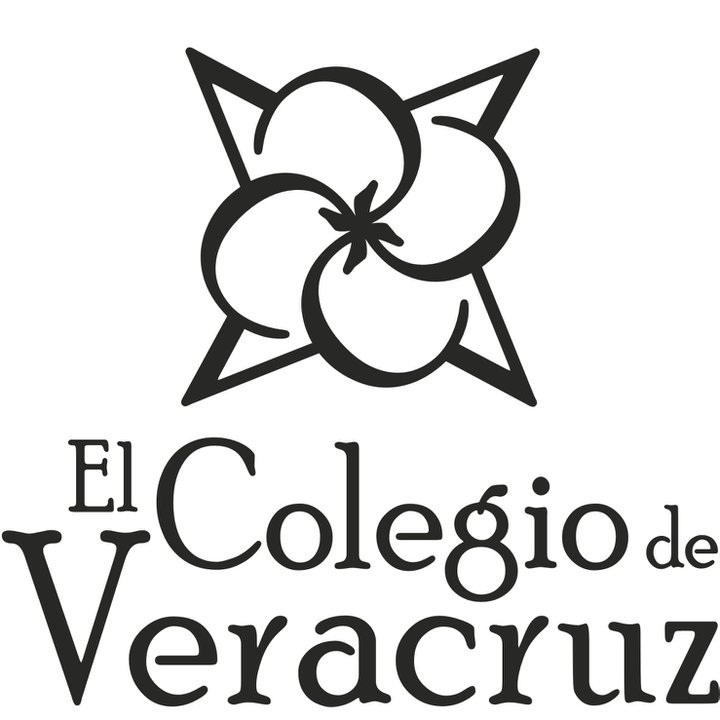
Escudo COLVER

The Veracruz State College of Political and Regional Studies (COLVER) was created in July 2002 by decree of the Veracruz State Government, headed by Miguel Alemán Velasco, following an initiative by Francisco Berlín Valenzuela and a group of Veracruz academics and politicians. Given the state of Veracruz's great economic, political, and cultural potential, it was deemed necessary to have a center for political and regional studies that would also serve as a promoter of areas previously neglected from an academic perspective, such as Political Science (absent at the Veracruzana University) and Regional Development, thereby fostering educational and social change in southeastern Mexico.
