= Parque de los Tecajetes =

Park in Xalapa, Mexico

Parque de los Tecajetes is a park in the city of Xalapa, in the state of Veracruz in eastern Mexico. Formed on a natural depression, underneath the ground is a fresh-water spring that feeds the aqueducts, artificial pools and canals that are a characteristic of the park.
