= Pinacoteca Diego Rivera =

Mexican art museum

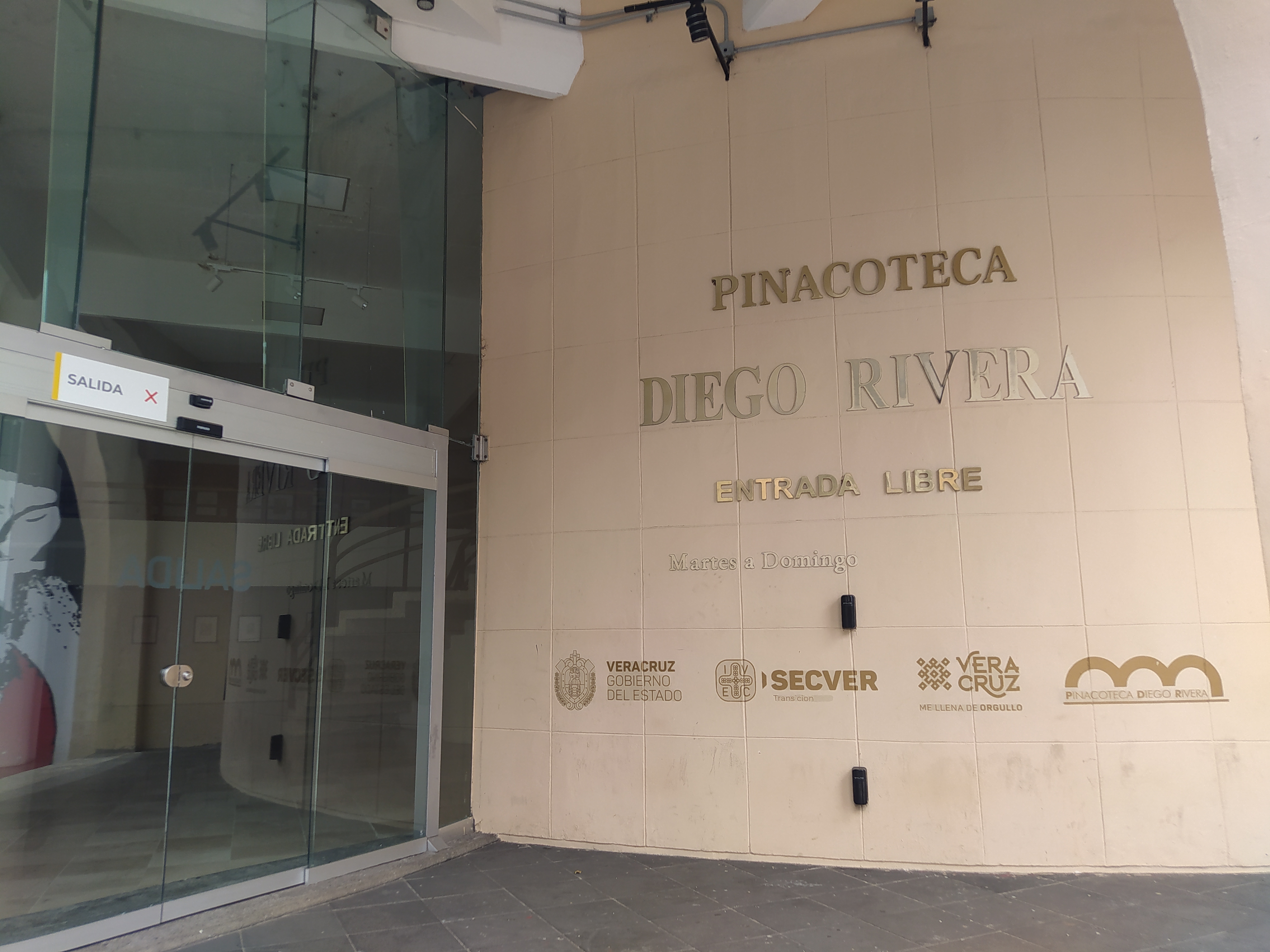
Main entrance

The Pinacoteca Diego Rivera is an art museum in downtown Xalapa, Veracruz, in eastern Mexico. It has a large collection of the works of Diego Rivera.

The museum was inaugurated by the state government on April 21, 1998, to provide the opportunity to the public to study the artwork of one of Mexico's famous painters.

== Background ==
This building was constructed in the historic center of the city of Xalapa. Initially housing the Veracruz State Archives, it became one of the most recognized architectural works after its renovation and, in turn, one of the cultural spaces with the greatest artistic activity.

== Facilities ==
It contains three exhibition halls:

- The "Main Hall".
- The " Jorge Cuesta" room, located on the ground floor
- The " Teodoro A. Dehesa" room located on the upper floor.

The Diego Rivera collection is displayed in the Main Hall, while the Jorge Cuesta and Teodoro Adehesa halls are spaces open to the work of talented artists who wish to exhibit their work.

== Activities ==
It features exhibitions of contemporary artists that change periodically, with the aim of offering a range of different cultural proposals throughout the year.

=== Conferences ===
The Diego Rivera Art Gallery offers the public relevant lectures whose central theme is the approach to, or relationship with, the subject matter of the exhibition presented at that time of year. Prominent artists, writers, and researchers related to the current artistic presentation participate.

== See also ==
- List of single-artist museums
- List of works by Diego Rivera
- Museo Mural Diego Rivera, Mexico City
