= Jalapa Railroad & Power Co. =

The Jalapa Railroad & Power Co. was a railroad enterprise that offered passenger and cargo service between the towns of Xalapa and Teocelo, within the state of Veracruz, Mexico, from 1898 thru 1945.

== History ==
"In 1895 the Jalapa Railroad & Power Co. of New Jersey projected a 76 km electric railway from Xalapa to Córdoba - which, if built, would have been the first electric railroad in Mexico. Steam locomotives opened the first 18.6 km of the line, as far as Teocelo, in 1898. The railway was never electrified and never reached Córdoba. Gas railcars replaced the locomotives in 1926 and service ended in 1945".

- The company was owned by Louis T. Haggin, son of American mogul James Ben Ali Haggin.
- Its representative in Mexico was John B. Frisbie (1823–1909), son-in-law of Mariano Guadalupe Vallejo.
- William K. Boone was the general manager from 1909 until the company was nationalized by the Mexican government in 1925.
- For more on WKB and JRR&PC see Hart, John Mason: Empire and Revolution. The Americans in Mexico since the Civil War. Berkeley, University of California, 2002.
