= Paseo de los Lagos =

Lake in Xalapa, Mexico

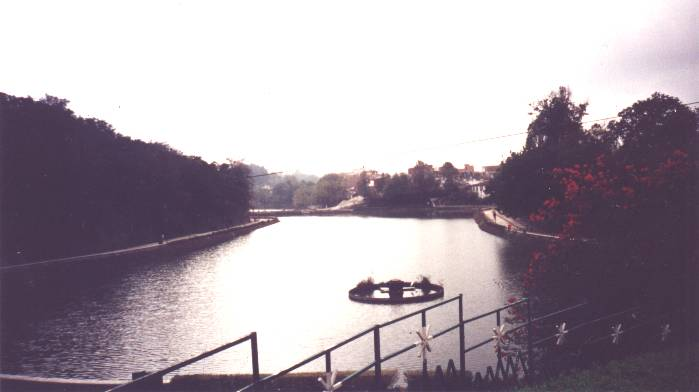

- Location within Veracruz Location within Mexico
- Location: Xalapa, Veracruz
- Coordinates: 19°31′08″N 96°55′18″W
- Basin countries: Mexico

Paseo de los Lagos is a lake and public path located in the city of Xalapa in Veracruz state in eastern Mexico. It was once the site of an ancient dam. The lake has a fresh-water spring and is surrounded by footpaths.
