= Servicio Urbano de Xalapa =

Servicio Urbano de Xalapa is a bus company operating in the city of Xalapa, Mexico.
