= Heriberto Jara Corona =

Mexican revolutionary and politician

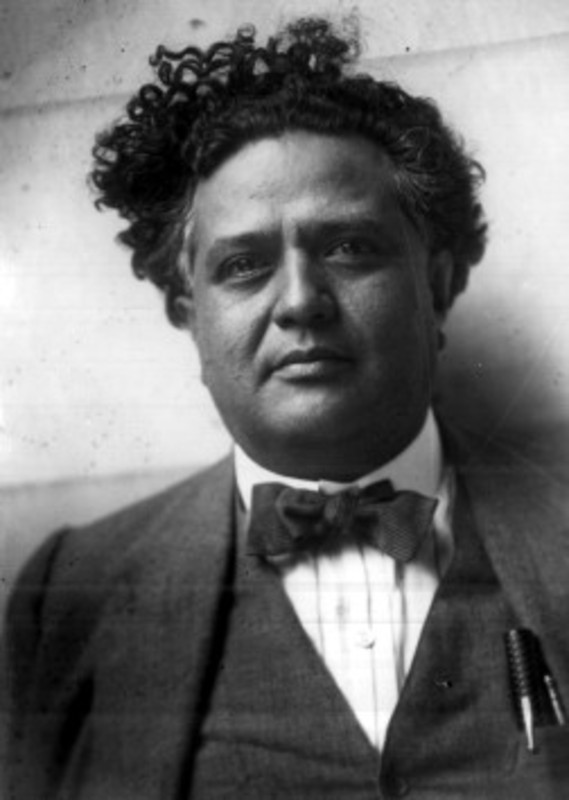

Secretary of the Navy
- In office 1 December 1940 – 30 November 1946
- President: Manuel Ávila Camacho
- Preceded by: Office established
- Succeeded by: Luis F. Schaufelberger

Governor of Tabasco
- In office 1918–1919
- Preceded by: Luis Hernández Hermosillo
- Succeeded by: Carlos A. Vidal

37th Governor of Veracruz
- In office December 1, 1924 – October 1927
- Preceded by: Adalberto Tejada Olivera
- Succeeded by: Abel S. Rodríguez

Personal details
- Born: July 10, 1879 Nogales, Veracruz
- Died: April 17, 1968 (aged 88) Mexico City, Federal District
- Party: PRI
- Spouse: Sofía Rodríguez Bobadilla
- Profession: Military and politician

Military service
- Allegiance: Mexico
- Branch/service: Mexican Navy
- Commands: Mexican Revolution, World War II

General Heriberto Jara Corona (July 10, 1879 – April 17, 1968) was a Mexican revolutionary, naval officer and politician. He served in a number of positions, including as ambassador to Cuba, as Governor of Tabasco, as Governor of Veracruz, and as Secretary of the Navy. He was a member of the Institutional Revolutionary Party (PRI).

== Early life and revolutionary ==
Heriberto Jara was born in the town of Nogales, in the state of Veracruz, to Emilio Jara Andrade and María del Carmen Corona. He got involved in the Mexican Revolution while working at a factory in the municipality of Río Blanco in his native Veracruz.

== Political career ==
The year Francisco I. Madero was elected President of Mexico he took over a seat in the Congress; then in 1916 he was elected again to serve in Congress and was one of the persons who drafted the 1917 Constitution. He served as Ambassador to Cuba and as Governor of Veracruz.

From December 1940 to November 1946, during the presidency of Manuel Ávila Camacho, he served as the inaugural secretary of the newly established Secretariat of the Navy. His tenure as Navy secretary coincided with Mexico's involvement in World War II on the side of the Allies, from 1942 to 1945.

== Legacy ==
He was awarded the Stalin Peace Prize in 1950 and, in 1959, he received the Belisario Domínguez Medal of Honor. General Heriberto Jara International Airport in the port of Veracruz is named after him, as is the Stadium at Xalapa, built in 1925 on the grounds where William K. Boone had organized Olympic-style athletic games in 1922.

Preceded by Luis Hernández Hermosillo	Governor of Tabasco; 1918 - 1919	Succeeded by Carlos A. Vidal
Preceded by Adalberto Tejada Olivera	Governor of Veracruz; 1924 - 1927	Succeeded by Abel S. Rodríguez
Preceded by Antonio Díaz Soto y Gama	Belisario Domínguez Medal of Honor; 1959	Succeeded by Isidro Fabela
