= Jardín de Esculturas =

Museum in the city of Xalapa

Jardín de Esculturas is a museum in the city of Xalapa, in the state of Veracruz in eastern Mexico. It is a sculptural garden, exhibiting works by nationally and internationally recognized artists.
