= Universidad de América Latina =

University in Xalapa, Mexico

Coordinates: 19.5733°N 96.9113°W

The Universidad de América Latina is a university in the city of Xalapa, Veracruz, Mexico.
