= Universidad Euro Hispanoamericana =

The Universidad Euro Hispanoamericana (UEH) is a private university located in the city of Xalapa, the political capital of Veracruz state, Mexico,
