= Xalapa Cathedral =

Coordinates: 19.527688°N 96.922994°W

- Catedral Metropolitana de la Inmaculada Concepción
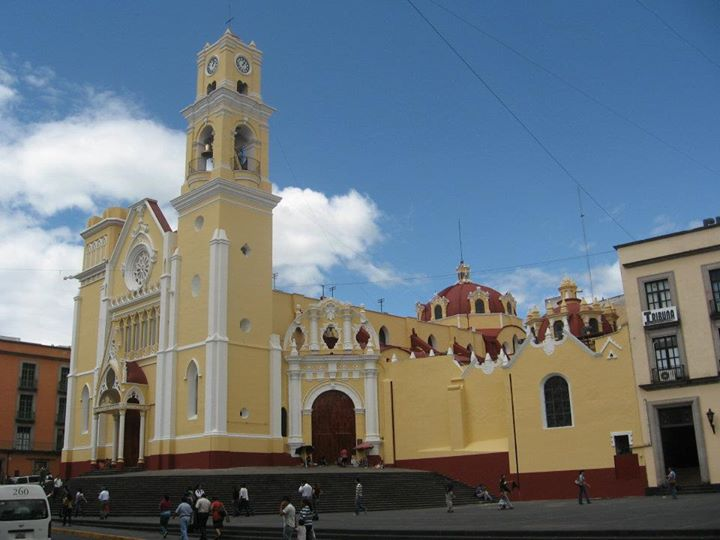
- Xalapa Cathedral
- Xalapa Cathedral
- Country: Xalapa, Mexico
- Denomination: Roman Catholic

History
- Founded: 1641

Architecture
- Style: Baroque (1772), Neogothic (1896)
- Years built: 1772

Xalapa Cathedral or in full, Catedral Metropolitana de la Inmaculada Concepción de Xalapa is a Roman Catholic cathedral in the city of Xalapa, Veracruz, in eastern Mexico. The see of the Metropolitan Archdiocese of Xalapa, it is one of the oldest constructions of the city.

The cathedral was originally built in 1641, but in 1772 it underwent massive change that reconstructed it in the baroque style. Some details in some parts of cathedral remain from this, including the bell tower. The clock itself was imported from England. The consecration of the status of cathedral was announced in 1864, coinciding with the creation of the official translation of the see of the "Diocese of Veracruz" (the old name of the current Metropolitan Archdiocese of Xalapa before 1951) to support it. In 1896, it underwent further modification forming an appearance, much of which remains today.

Saint Rafael Guízar y Valencia (1878–1938) is interred there.

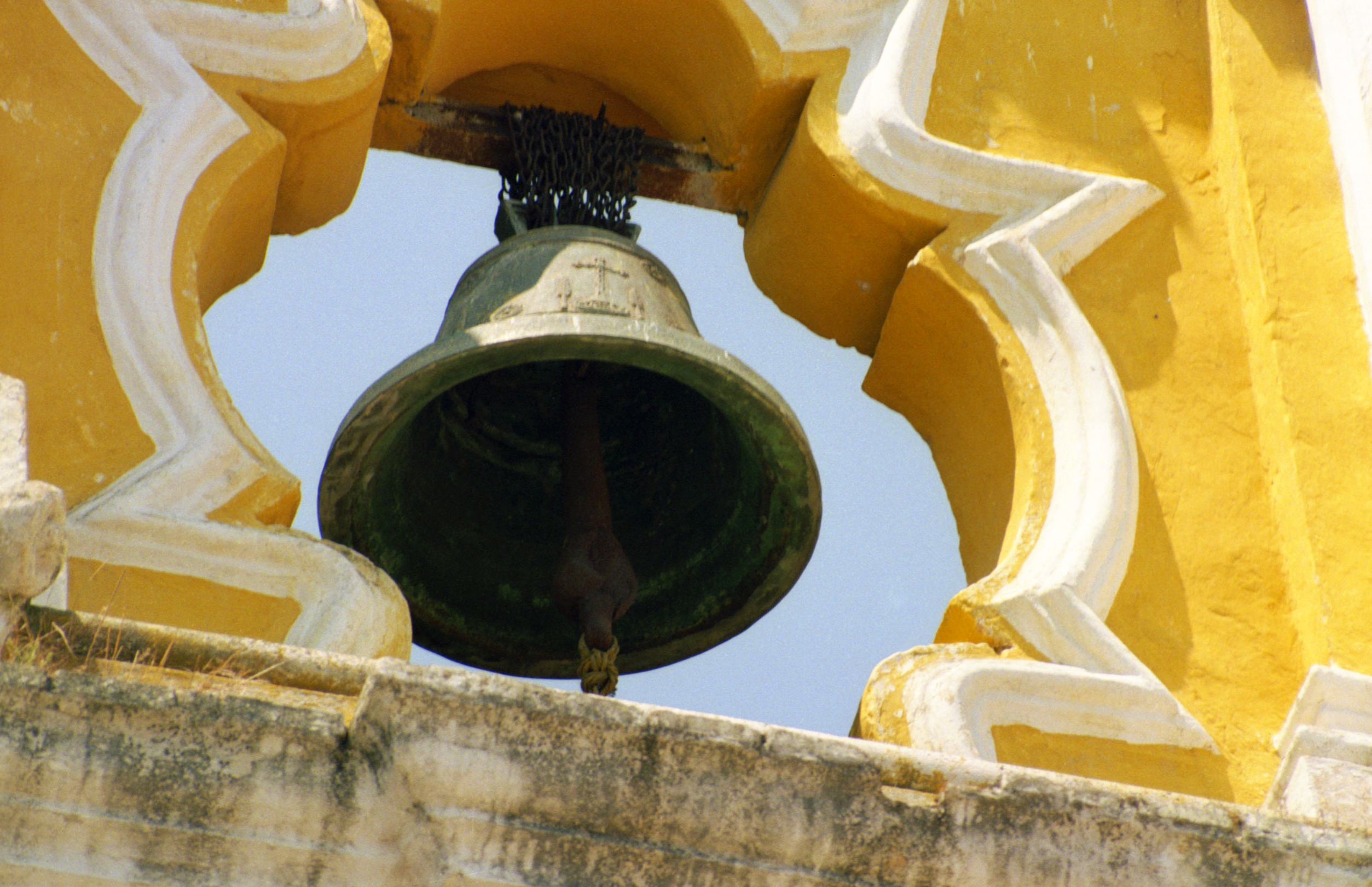
Xalapa Cathedral bell
