= Callejón del Diamante =

Street in Xalapa, Veracruz, Mexico

Callejón del Diamante (Diamond Alley) is an important central street in the city of Xalapa in the state of Veracruz in eastern Mexico.

At night the street is often crowded with a bohemian atmosphere and features a number of cafes and shops catering for the arts. It's located near the Callejón Jesús te Ampare, a cobblestone street which connects to the Church of San José of Xalapa.

The name comes from a local legend about a Spanish caballero and his criolla wife.
