= William K. Boone =

American philanthropist

William Kenneth Boone (1875–1944), a U.S. citizen, was a "distinguished philanthropist and benefactor of the city" of Xalapa, Veracruz.

Throughout his life he sent numerous letters, postcards, and photographs to his parents and sisters at home. These were kept by his family in Lima, Ohio, and eventually found their way to his (only) granddaughter, who thereby was able to piece together most of his story as well as to integrate his collection of images and documents into The Boone-Canovas Collection.

== Biography ==
He was born in Lima, Ohio, on April 9, 1875, to William McKelvey Boone (1834–1913), retired colonel, veteran of the Civil War and successful businessman (W. K. Boone Hardware Store), who had moved from Hughesville, Pennsylvania, through Wooster, Ohio, finally settling down in Lima. His mother was Mary Elizabeth Heffelfinger (1834–1927).

He was related to two outstanding figures in American history who were an inspiration to him and his descendants: Daniel Boone and Abraham Lincoln.

=== Education ===
He enrolled at what was then called the Case School of Applied Science in Cleveland, OH, which he attended for two years (1895–1896), just around the times of the Chicago World's Fair and its electrical exhibits (1893) and the famous Michelson–Morley experiment on the nature and speed of light conducted at this institute.

=== Later life ===
While working for the Lima Locomotive Works, he applied for a job in Xalapa and was accepted, so he travelled by train from Lima and arrived in Xalapa in February 1898, at 22 years of age, hardly speaking any Spanish, to work as supervisor of operations for the Texolo hydroelectric power plant.

From 1900 to 1904 he resided in California and worked in the electrical operations of the Homestake Mining Company, in gold and silver mines near Lundy, California. He also worked at another one of their mines: Frenchtown Camp in the Kern River Canyon of the Greenhorn Mountains near Bakersfield.

On January 6, 1904, in Los Angeles, California, he married Blanche Marmon (also from Lima, Ohio). Within a few months, he and his wife moved to Xalapa and lived there permanently until his death in 1944, while he worked, first as superintendent of the electricity division, and as of 1909, at General John B. Frisbie's death, as general manager for the Jalapa Railroad and Power Co. (JRR&PC) – except for a few times during the Mexican Revolution (1910–1920) when he had to seek refuge in the American Embassy at Mexico City and move temporarily to the US, fearing that his life was at stake.

He died in Mexico City on August 19, 1944.

Genealogical chart of William K. Boone

William Boone (Berks County, PA (1724–1790)
Hezekiah Boone (1767–1827)
William Boone (1792 1892)
Hannah Hughes (1768–1891)
William McKelvey Boone (Wooster, Ohio 1834–1913)
Rebeca Purcil (1798- )
William K. Boone
William Heffelfinger
Mary Elizabeth Heffelfinger
Margaret Marks

== Areas of work and Employment ==
- 1896-1898: Lima Locomotive & Machine Company
- 1898-1900: Jalapa Railroad & Power Co. (JRR&PC) - Electricity Supervisor
- 1900-1904: Homestake Mining Company
- 1904-1909: Jalapa Railroad & Power Co. (JRR&PC) - Superintendent
- 1909-1926: Jalapa Railroad & Power Co. (JRR&PC) - General Manager
- ca.1907-ca.1914: Vice and Deputy Consul for the US in Jalapa, "for some 7 years prior to 1918".
- 1920: President of the "Junta de Obras Materiales de Jalapa"
- 1921: President of the Jalapa Chamber of Commerce

== Legacy ==
- The Stadium at Xalapa on what had been a swampy field, the so-called "Ciénega de Melgarejo".
- A ramp to provide direct access for vehicles from the (old) train station to downtown, next to Parque Juárez
- The scenic twin spiral roads to the top of Cerro Macuiltépec
- The Rotary Club of Jalapa
- The automobile road between Xalapa and Veracruz

His collection of old photographs of México and particularly of Xalapa, from the early 1900s, forms part of the Boone-Canovas collection.

- See Boone-Canovas Collection

As a genealogist: documentation on several generations of ancestors of some Mexican families, particularly the descendancy of Sinforosa Amador who had settled in Xalapa and was reported as saying that "she was from California".

- See "Gráfica genealógica" (Genealogical chart) which he documented for his daughter in-law Carmen Canovas Güido.

Due to the unsettled conditions of affairs in Mexico, I have not been able to devote much time to ancestors, rather I have been too much interested in the safety of my posterity – he wrote amid hijacking and bombing threats during the Mexican Revolution in 1914.

== Memorials in Xalapa ==
- He was named "el más xalapeño de los extranjeros" (the most Xalapeño of foreigners) by Rubén Pabello Acosta, the city chronicler.
- An inscription dedicated in 1946 by the "Club Rotario de Xalapa" on the facade of the house where he had lived, on Calle de Alfaro.
- On December 2, 1994, the Municipality of Xalapa presented him with a posthumous recognition

al hombre que con su talento y generosidad contribuyó en su tiempo a prefigurar la imagen moderna de Xalapa, a la que amó entrañablemente y a la cual dedicó con devoción lo mejor de su esfuerzo y de su vocación de servicio

(to the man who with his talent and generosity contributed in his time to sketch the modern image of Xalapa which he loved dearly and to which he devotedly dedicated his efforts and his vocation of service).

- Plaza William K. Boone at a park entrance in Fraccionamiento Las Araucarias
- Lomas de Boone: an area of the city at the foot of Cerro Macuiltépec, where he had once planted a ranch of avocadoes.
- Avenida William K. Boone in Fraccionamiento Lucas Martín, by the town of Sedeño.
- A 6.2 km foot race was named after him at Parque Ecológico Macuiltépec, on Sept. 6, 2009.

== See also ==
- Boone-Canovas Collection – old photos of Xalapa, Veracruz, and Mexico
- Macuiltépec (in Spanish)
- Estadio Xalapeño (in Spanish)
- Xalapa
- Jalapa Railroad & Power Co. (JRR&PC)

== External references ==
- Archivo de inmigrantes distinguidos del siglo 20 en México
- Estado de Veracruz – Verdades sobre México – El País del Porvenir – El Libro Azul de México // State of Veracruz – Facts about Mexico – The Country of the Future – The Blue Book of Mexico (bilingual, Spanish and English). México, Compañía Editorial Pan-Americana, S. A., 1923. Facsimile edition of the Editora del Gobierno, 2007; reprinted in 2008. See articles relevant to WKB in pages 15, 67, 170, 177, 178, 179, 180, 181, 196–198, 197 (authored by him) and 199.
- Bazarte Martínez, Alicia: Trazos de una vida, bosquejos de una Ciudad. El pintor Carlos Rivera y Xalapa. México, Instituto Politécnico Nacional / Gobierno del Estado de Veracruz, 2009 (pp. 173-). (in Spanish)
- Bermúdez Gorrochótegui, Gilberto. Sumaria Historia de Xalapa. Editorial Gobierno del Estado de Veracruz-Llave, Instituto de Antropología e Historia, 2000. See pages 163, 213, 236 (Rotary Club's formal application for the spiral road in Macuiltepec to be named after WKB), 238 (Stadium), 253.
- Pasquel, Leonardo. Xalapeños Distinguidos, México, D.F., Editorial Citlaltepec, 1975, pp. 53–54. (in Spanish)

"Thanks to [WKB's] initiative [...] starting the roads to Veracruz and Nautla, all of that undertaken without having money, but driving the people forward with his enthusiasm, faith, and dynamism.
"A man loved, respected, active, lover of Nature and in-love with Xalapa."
