= Parque Juárez =

Public park in Xalapa, Mexico

Coordinates: 19°31′34″N 96°55′26″W

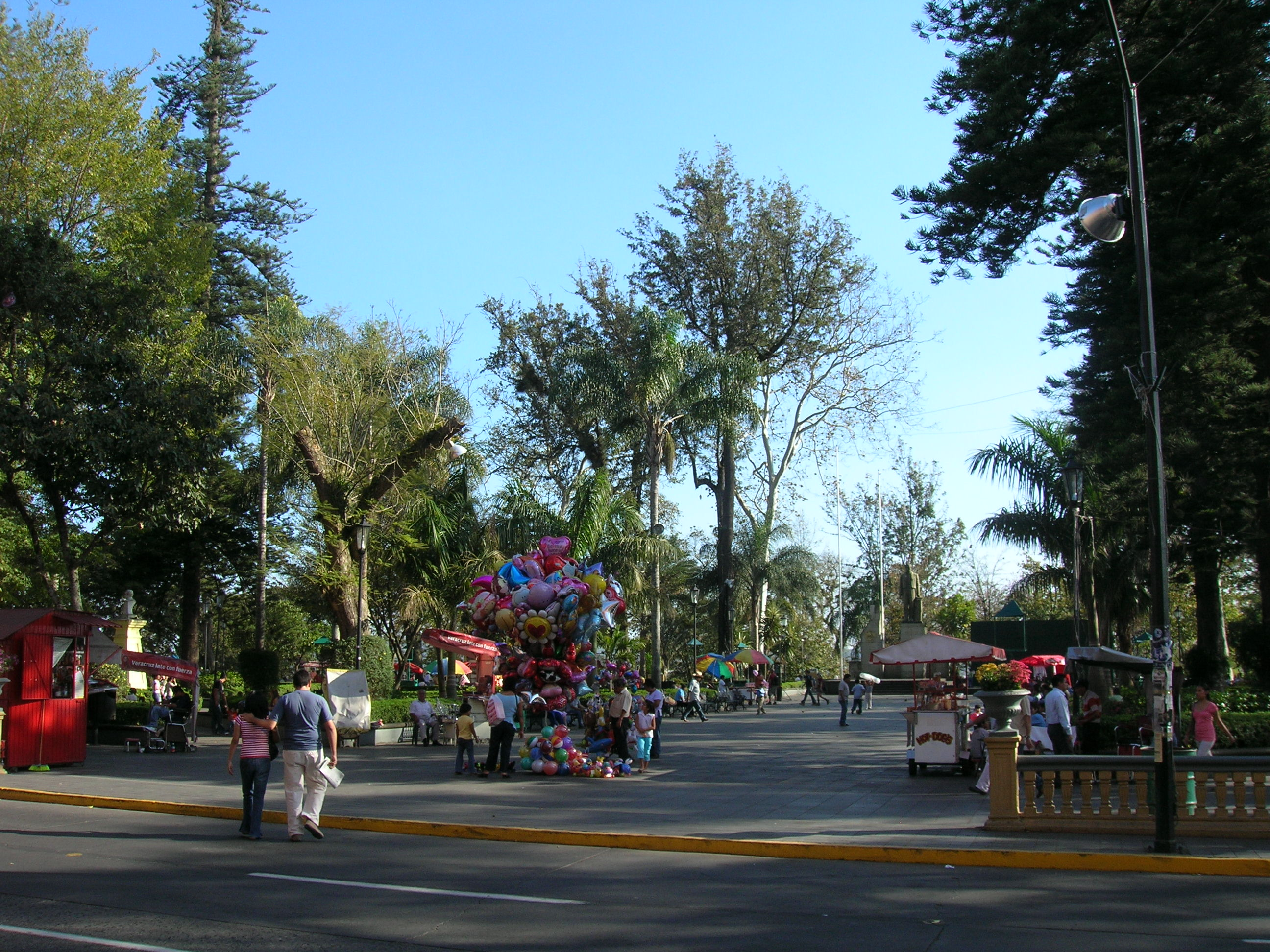

Parque Juárez is a public park in the city of Xalapa, in the state of Veracruz in eastern Mexico. It was inaugurated in 1892 and named in honor of Benito Juárez, 20 years after his death. The park is located in central Xalapa with a terrace-like appearance adjoining the Palacio de Gobierno building, across the street from the Palacio Municipal and close to the cathedral. Since the early 16th century, the site had been the location of the Monastery of San Francisco.

The central garden of the park features enormous araucaria trees, some of which were brought to México as a present to Porfirio Díaz by the ambassador from Chile, sometime before the inauguration of the park in 1892. The southern side of the park looks over the valley below, offering scenic views of the Sierra Madre Oriental mountains: Cofre de Perote to the West and snowcapped Pico de Orizaba to the South. In 1922, the Junta de Obras Materiales de Jalapa, presided by William K. Boone, proposed, designed and built a ramp to make it easier for vehicles to reach the center of the city from the (old) train station. In 1930, the ramp del Parque Juárez was renamed Paseo del Ayuntamiento and later Paseo de la Constitución. At about the middle of the ramp, there are four statues that represent the Cardinal Virtues: Fortitude, Justice, Prudence, and Temperance. The first three were set in 1931; the last one in 1979.
