= Juan de la Luz Enríquez =

Mexican politician

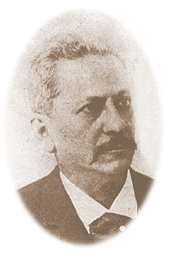

General Juan de la Luz Enríquez Lara (born Tlacotalpan, May 16, 1836 – died Xalapa, March 17, 1892) was a Mexican politician. He served as Governor of Veracruz from 1884, until his death in 1892.

The official name of the city of Xalapa, Xalapa Enríquez, is in his honor and he is the patron of the city. His name is honored, largely due to his policies which brought rapid development and prosperity to Xalapa and the foundation of important schools and universities in the 1880s and 1890s. General Enríquez, in coordination with the Swiss teacher Enrique C. Rébsamen, founded the Normal School in Xalapa, the first school of this type in the entire country in 1886.
