= Xalapa =

Municipality and city in Veracruz, Mexico

Xalapa Xalapan Jalapa
- Municipality and City
- Xalapa-Enríquez
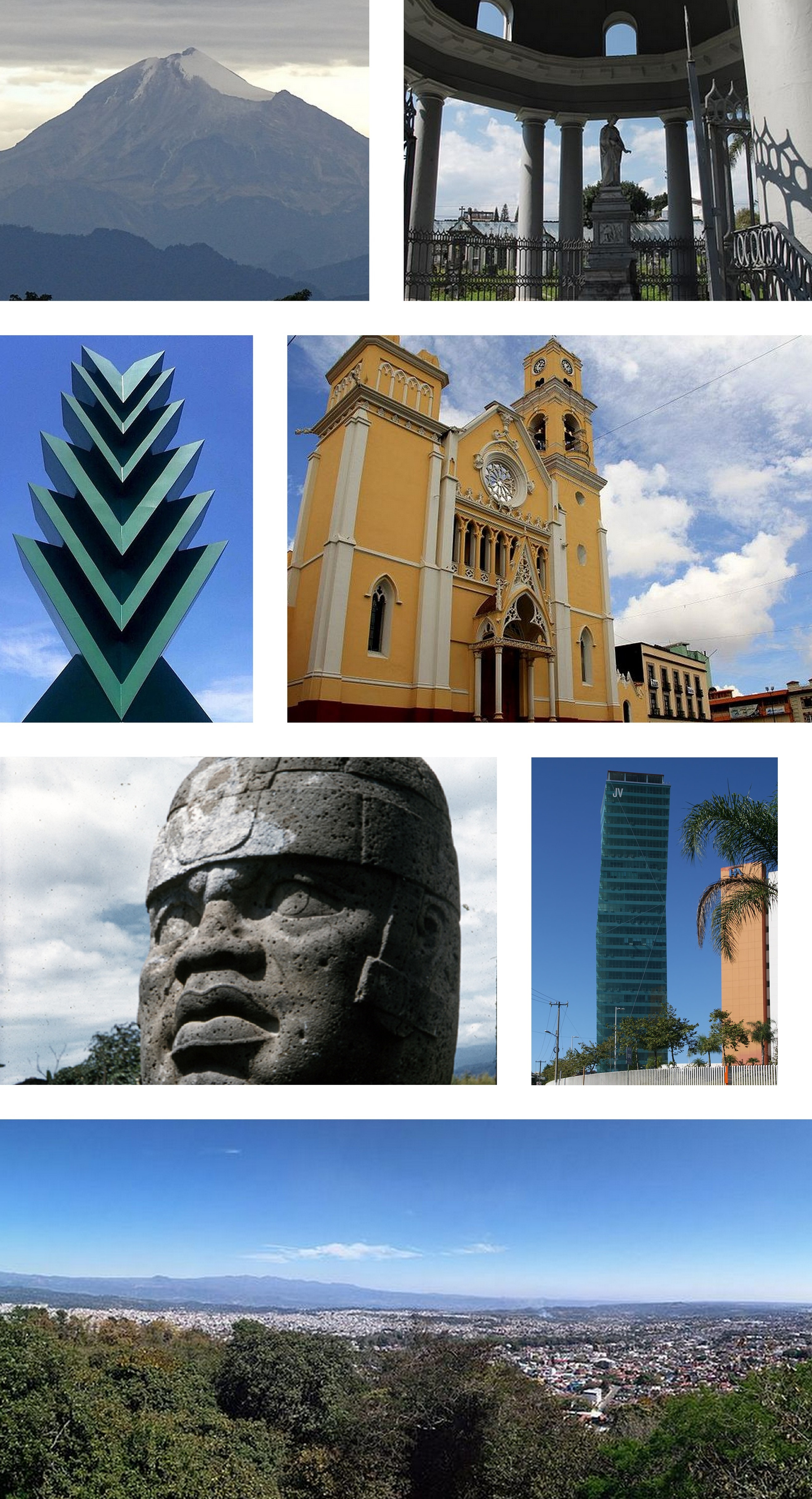
- Clockwise, from upper left: Pico de Orizaba, General Juan de la Luz Enríquez Lara tomb, Xalapa Cathedral, Centro Mayor Tower, panoramic view from the Macuiltepetl's Mountain, Olmec colossal head from the Xalapa Museum of Anthropology, Araucaria sculpture.

- Coat of arms
- Nickname: La Ciudad de las Flores ("The City of Flowers")
- Motto: Xalapa
- Location within Veracruz Location within Mexico Location within North America
- Coordinates: 19°32′24″N 96°55′59″W
- Country: Mexico
- State: Veracruz
- Region: Capital Region
- Founded: 1313
- Declared as a city: 18 December 1791

Government
  - Mayor: Daniela Griego Ceballos (since 2026) (MORENA)

Area
  - Total: 124.4 km^{2} (48.0 sq mi)
- Elevation: 1,417 m (4,649 ft)

Population (2020)
  - Total: 488,531
  - Density: 3,927.8/km^{2} (10,173/sq mi)
  - Seat: 443,063
  - Metro: 789,157
  - Metro density: 622.21/km^{2} (1,611.5/sq mi)
- Demonym(s): Jalapeño, Xalapeño

GDP (PPP, constant 2015 values)
  - Year: 2023
  - Total (Metro): $9 billion
  - Per capita: $11,000
- Time zone: UTC−6 (CST)
- Website: www.xalapa.gob.mx

Xalapa or Jalapa (English: /həˈlɑːpə/, Spanish: [xaˈlapa]), officially Xalapa-Enríquez (IPA: [xaˈlapa enˈrikes]), is the capital city of the Mexican state of Veracruz and the name of the surrounding municipality. In 2020 census the city reported a population of 443,063 and the municipality of which it serves as municipal seat reported a population of 488,531. The municipality has an area of 118.45 km^{2}. Xalapa lies near the geographic center of the state and is the second-largest city in the state after the city of Veracruz to the southeast.

== Etymology ==
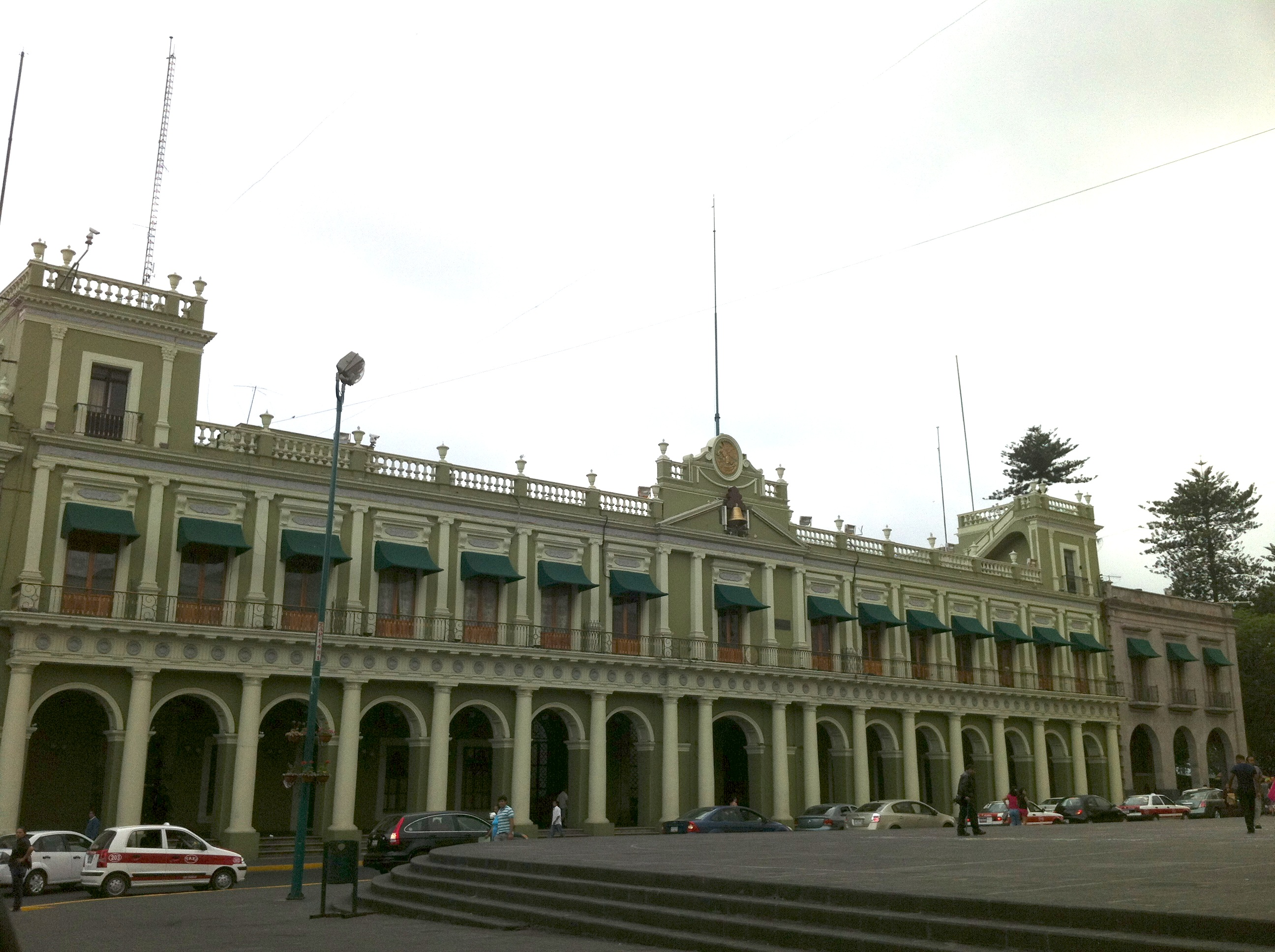
The Palace of Government of Veracruz (Governor's Office)

The name Xalapa comes from the Classical Nahuatl roots xālli (pronounced [ʃaːlːi], 'sand') and āpan ([aːpan], 'place of water'), which means approximately 'spring in the sand'. It's classically pronounced [ʃalaːpan] in Nahuatl, although the final /n/ is often omitted. This was adopted into Spanish as Xalapa.

The complete name of the city is Xalapa-Enríquez, bestowed in honor of a governor from the 19th century, Juan de la Luz Enríquez. The city's nickname, "City of Flowers" (Spanish: La ciudad de las flores), was given by Alexander von Humboldt, who visited the city 10 February 1804. The reference is also related to the city's older colonial history. According to folklore, the Spanish believed that Jalapa was the birthplace and home of the world's most beautiful woman, la Florecita, which literally means 'little flower'. The residents of Xalapa are called Xalapeños or Jalapeños, which is also the name given to the popular large peppers cultivated in this area.

== History ==
The Totonacs first established themselves around Macuiltepetl ("fifth mountain" in Nahuatl). This extinct volcano received its name because the Aztecs used it as the fifth reference mountain to get to the gulf of Mexico's shores. Today it is preserved in a park. During the 14th century, four indigenous peoples settled in the territory today known as Xalapa. Each built a small village: Xalitic (in the sand) was founded by the Totonacas; in the northeast Tecuanapan (river of the beasts) was founded by the Toltecas, and Tlalnecapan was founded by the Teochichimecas.

Around 1313, the four villages grew together and joined, forming one large village named Xallapan. Moctezuma Ilhuicamina, the fifth Aztec emperor, invaded the territory during the second half of the 15th century. All the land was ruled as part of the Aztec Empire before the arrival and conquest of the Spanish conquistadores.

In 1519 Hernán Cortés passed through en route to Tenochtitlan. In 1555 Spanish Franciscans completed construction of a convent, an important event in the Nueva España of that time.

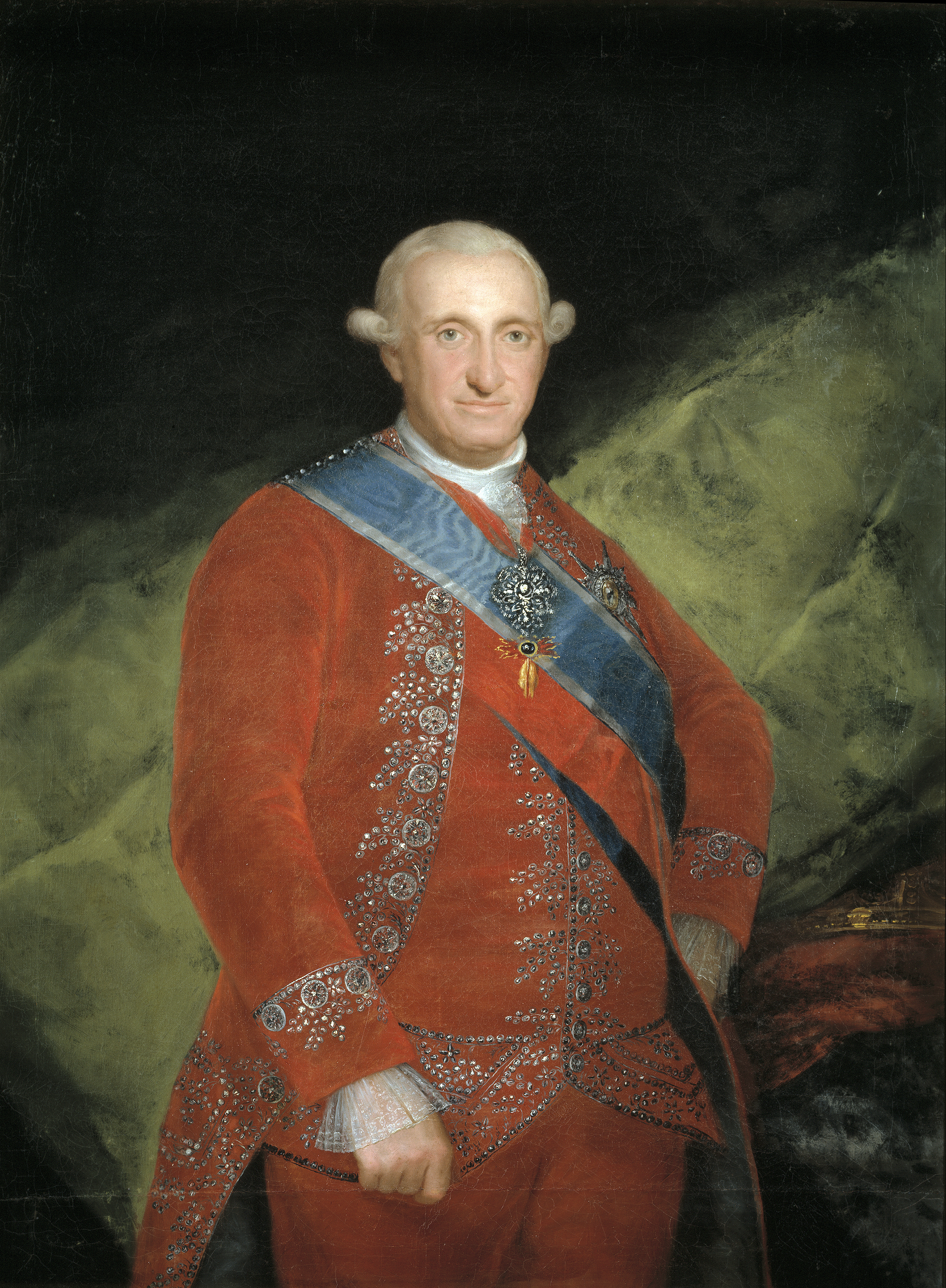
Charles IV of Spain officially elevated the status of Xalapa to villa on 18 December 1791.

When the Spanish invaded, Xalapa was barely populated. The population rose after the conquest and colonial settlement. When the Spanish improved the Mexico-Orizaba-Veracruz route, Xalapa declined in importance as a transport hub, and its population stagnated in the 17th century.

From 1720 on Xalapa became increasingly important, due to trade with merchants from New Spain arriving to buy and sell the products of the peninsula. Numerous Spanish families from the nearby towns settled in Xalapa, so by 1760 the population had increased to over 1,000 inhabitants, including mestizo and Spanish. Among local items of commerce were botanical medicines particularly ipomoea purga source of a drug known in English as Jalap. The growth of Xalapa in population, culture, commerce and importance, increased dramatically in the 18th century. Responding to residents' requests, Carlos IV of Spain declared Xalapa a town on 18 December 1791.

In 1772, construction of Xalapa Cathedral began. On 18 May 1784, José María Alfaro got the first air balloon in the Americas, airborne, in Xalapa. Due to the abundance of flowers growing in the region, Alexander von Humboldt, who visited the town on 10 February 1804, christened it the "city of the flowers".

On 29 November 1830 by decree, Xalapa was named a city. In 1843, Don Antonio María de Rivera founded the Normal School of Xalapa to train teachers. Today it operates as a preparatory school for students going to college.

In 1847, during the Mexican–American War, Mexican general Antonio López de Santa Anna attempted to defeat the opposing forces near Xalapa in the Battle of Cerro Gordo. He led an army of more than 12,000 soldiers. Mexican troops suffered many casualties; around a thousand were killed and three thousand wounded on 18 April 1847. The US invaders occupied the city the following day. Among them was Lt. Ulysses S. Grant, later the commanding general of the Union armies in the American Civil War. Grant's letters call Jalapa "decidedly the most beautiful place I ever saw in my life" and its climate "the best in the world."

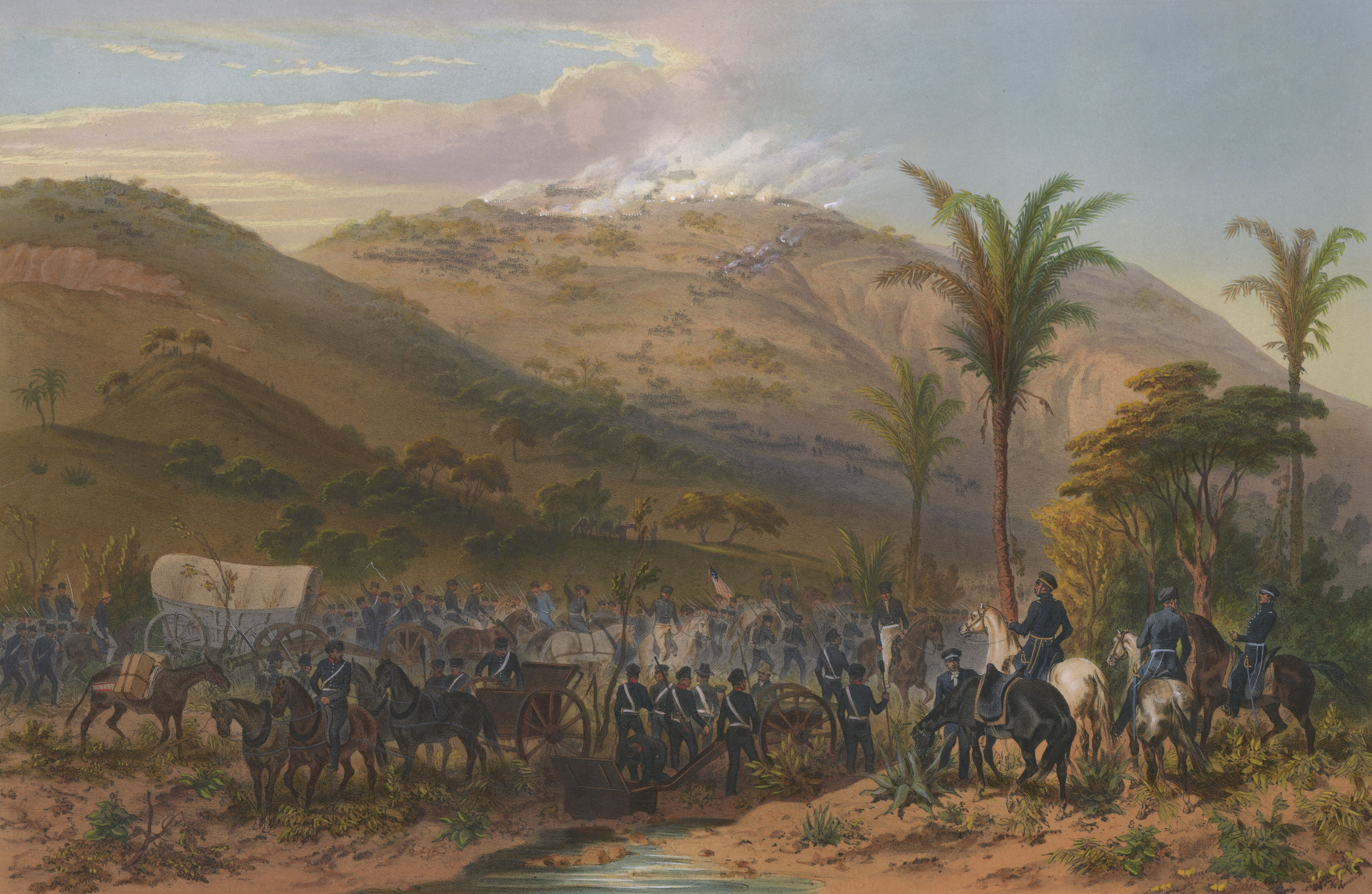
Battle of Cerro Gordo (1847)

Xalapeños such as Ambrosio Alcalde and Antonio García fought hard to defend the city of Veracruz, but were taken prisoner. They were released and paroled, but after rejoining the fighting against the US, they were recaptured near Teocelo, taken to Xalapa, sentenced to death and executed on 24 November 1847. Today these two men are remembered as martyrs. An obelisk commemorates their sacrifice, between San Jose Church and Alcalde Market, named for Ambrosio Alcalde. US forces marched on to capture Mexico City and departed after the Treaty of Guadalupe Hidalgo.

In November 1862 Xalapa was attacked in the French invasion; foreigners temporarily took control of the state capital. On 27 November 1867 the corpse of emperor Maximilian I of Mexico, who had been executed in Querétaro, arrived and was held in San José, attended by the priest José María y Daza, then transferred to Veracruz the following day. The remains were shipped back to Austria for burial.

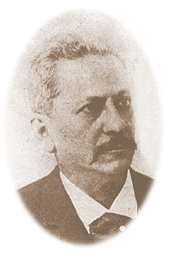
Governor Juan de la Luz Enríquez (1836–1892) for whom the city is named

In 1885 General Juan de la Luz Enríquez increased the influence of Xalapa when he moved some legislative authority from Orizaba to Xalapa, in accordance with a decree issued in June 1884 by provisional Governor Juan Manuel Fernández de Jáuregui. Enríquez and Swiss teacher Enrique C. Rébsamen in 1886 founded the Normal School in Xalapa, the first school of this type in the country. Enríquez died in 1892, but the construction of the Normal School and founding of its other schools led to Xalapa becoming known as a center of learning, the "Athens of Veracruz".

On 18 May 1911, Francisco I. Madero visited Xalapa. On 21 June of the same year a minor conflict occurred between federal forces and revolutionaries.

== Geography ==
=== Climate ===
Xalapa-Enríquez, Veracruz (1991-2020)

Climate chart (precipitation, max. and min. temperature)
J	F	M	A	M	J	J	A	S	O	N	D
48 21 10	34 22 11	57 24 13	70 27 15	110 28 16	284 27 16	180 26 15	213 26 15	253 26 16	132 25 15	48 22 12	34 21 11
- █ Average max. and min. temperatures in °C
- █ Precipitation totals in mm
- Source: Servicio Meteorológico Nacional, NOAA
Imperial conversion
J	F	M	A	M	J	J	A	S	O	N	D
1.9 70 50	1.4 72 52	2.2 75 55	2.7 81 59	4.3 82 61	11 81 61	7.1 79 59	8.4 79 59	9.9 79 61	5.2 77 59	1.9 72 54	1.4 70 52
- █ Average max. and min. temperatures in °F
- █ Precipitation totals in inches

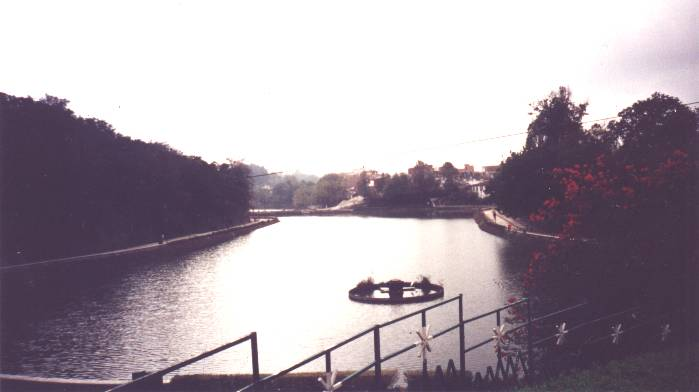
Overlooking the Paseo de los Lagos in Xalapa

Xalapa features an oceanic climate (Cfb) that borders on a humid subtropical climate (Cfa) under the Köppen climate classification. The climate in Xalapa is humid, but the city is relatively cool being located in the mountains over 1400 meters above sea level. The climate can be variable, having a maximum temperature of 38.4 °C and a minimum ranging from 0 °C to 10 °C, but on average the temperature does not fluctuate greatly all year round with an average annual temperature of 18 °C. The warmer season in Xalapa tends to fall between March and reaching a peak in May when the average high reaches 28 °C and low of 16 °C. The cooler season is late December, January and February with an average low of 11 °C and an average high of 21 °C. Travelers to Xalapa will generally find that the most comfortable weather occurs from the beginning of November to mid-April, although they would be well-advised to bring warm clothing, as nighttime winter temperatures can occasionally drop to near 0 °C.

The average annual precipitation is 1509.1 mm. During the cooler winter months rainfall is at a minimum, with Xalapa receiving only 42 millimeters in January and 38 millimetres in February on average. Snow, however, is common in winter outside the city at Perote, located around 35 minutes from Xalapa. Very early in the morning, Xalapa often has a mist, giving it a characteristic mountain atmosphere. The most rainfall occurs during the summer months, particularly in June, when on average rainfall reaches 328 millimeters, remaining relatively high until mid-September.

Climate data for Xalapa-Enríquez (1991-2020)
Month	Jan	Feb	Mar	Apr	May	Jun	Jul	Aug	Sep	Oct	Nov	Dec	Year
Record high °C (°F)	32.4 (90.3)	33.4 (92.1)	37.4 (99.3)	37.0 (98.6)	38.4 (101.1)	36.0 (96.8)	31.5 (88.7)	31.9 (89.4)	32.4 (90.3)	32.9 (91.2)	33.0 (91.4)	32.5 (90.5)	38.4 (101.1)
Mean daily maximum °C (°F)	20.6 (69.1)	22.4 (72.3)	24.4 (75.9)	26.8 (80.2)	27.5 (81.5)	26.6 (79.9)	26.1 (79.0)	26.3 (79.3)	25.6 (78.1)	24.5 (76.1)	22.4 (72.3)	21.3 (70.3)	24.5 (76.1)
Daily mean °C (°F)	14.9 (58.8)	16.3 (61.3)	18.1 (64.6)	20.2 (68.4)	21.1 (70.0)	20.7 (69.3)	20.1 (68.2)	20.1 (68.2)	19.8 (67.6)	18.8 (65.8)	16.9 (62.4)	15.7 (60.3)	18.6 (65.5)
Mean daily minimum °C (°F)	10.4 (50.7)	11.3 (52.3)	12.8 (55.0)	14.9 (58.8)	16.0 (60.8)	16.3 (61.3)	15.3 (59.5)	15.4 (59.7)	15.8 (60.4)	14.5 (58.1)	12.4 (54.3)	11.1 (52.0)	13.8 (56.8)
Record low °C (°F)	0.2 (32.4)	0.0 (32.0)	2.8 (37.0)	4.0 (39.2)	7.0 (44.6)	9.0 (48.2)	9.0 (48.2)	9.5 (49.1)	9.8 (49.6)	5.0 (41.0)	−2.2 (28.0)	0.9 (33.6)	−2.2 (28.0)
Average precipitation mm (inches)	48.2 (1.90)	34.3 (1.35)	56.9 (2.24)	69.6 (2.74)	110.2 (4.34)	284.3 (11.19)	180.4 (7.10)	213.4 (8.40)	252.5 (9.94)	131.7 (5.19)	47.8 (1.88)	34.3 (1.35)	1,463.6 (57.62)
Average precipitation days (≥ 0.1 mm)	14.9	12.2	12.8	13.8	14.1	18.5	18.1	20.0	21.7	18.4	14.9	14.0	193.5
Average relative humidity (%)	79	76	75	73	76	80	80	81	83	81	82	81	79
Mean monthly sunshine hours	143	133	166	155	159	138	215	168	132	145	154	142	1,850
Source 1: Servicio Meteorológico Nacional, NOAA
Source 2: Deutscher Wetterdienst (Sun 1961–1990) (Note: Station ID for Jalapa, VER. is 76539 Use this station ID to locate the sunshine duration)

=== The municipality ===
Xalapa is situated in eastern-central Mexico, approximately 55 miles (89 km) northwest of Veracruz city. and roughly 350 kilometres from Mexico City. The municipality of Xalapa has an area of 118.45 square kilometres which comprises 0.16% of Veracruz state. It borders to the north with Banderilla, Jilotepec and Naolinco, to the east with Actopan and Emiliano Zapata, to the south with Coatepec and the west with Tlalnelhuayocan.

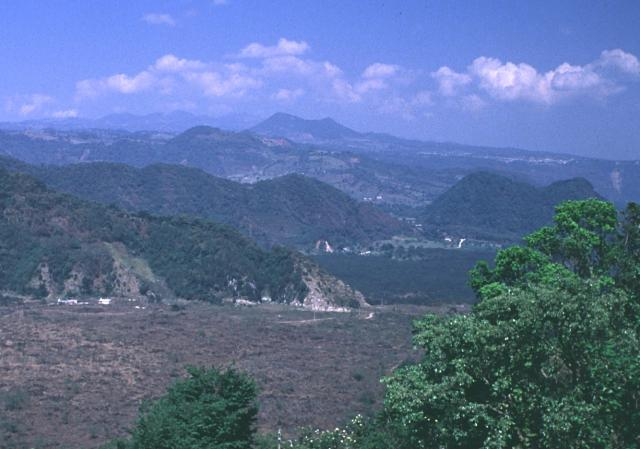
Naolinco volcanic field, north of Xalapa city

Situated east, about 50 km (31 mi) away along Mexican Federal Highway 140 is the Cofre de Perote National Park. The park covers an area of 117 km^{2} (29,000 acres), and consists of mainly forested mountains and hills.

Xalapa's highest point is Cerro de Macuiltépetl, which rises 1522 metres above sea level. Other hills of prominence include the Cerro de Acalotépetl and the Cerro Colorado.

From Xalapa you can also see the Pico de Orizaba, the highest peak in Mexico (5,366m or 18,490 feet) and the third highest in North America.

Hydrographically, there are numerous streams and springs which are in the area around the city. These include the rivers: Sedeño River, Carneros River, Sordo River, Santiago River, Zapotillo River, Castillo River and the Coapexpan River, 3 artificial lakes and the springs Chiltoyac, Ánimas, Xallitic, Techacapan and Tlalnecapan. Jalcomulco is located 39 km (24 mi) southeast of Xalapa which has numerous natural features, such as the mouth of the Pescados River. Cascada de Texolo (Texolo Waterfall) is located 19 km (12 mi) southwest of Xalapa, in the town of Xico. It is an 80 meters (260 feet) waterfall that drops into a lush canyon, home to numerous animal species.

== Demographics ==
Historical population
Year	Pop.	±%
1995	336,632	—
2000	390,590	+16.0%
2005	413,136	+5.8%
2010	457,928	+10.8%
2015	480,841	+5.0%
2020	488,531	+1.6%

With a population of 443,063 inhabitants in Xalapa City and 488,531 inhabitants in the municipality as 2020, Xalapa is the second biggest city and municipality in terms of population in Veracruz. There are 63 localities, 6 classified as urban and 57 classified as rural, besides Xalapa-Enríquez, other localities includes Santa Bárbara (13,783 hab.), El Castillo (6,957 hab.), Lomas Verdes (6,502 hab.) and Las Fuentes (3,614 hab.). 6,542 are classified as living in indigenous homes, 2,673 of which speak an indigenous language.

Xalapa is the core of a metropolitan area, which together with the municipalities of Banderilla, Coatepec, Coacoatzintla, Emiliano Zapata, Jilotepec, Rafael Lucio, Tlalnelhuayocan and Xico had a population of 789,157 inhabitants as 2020, the second biggest metro area in the state after Veracruz.

== Economy ==
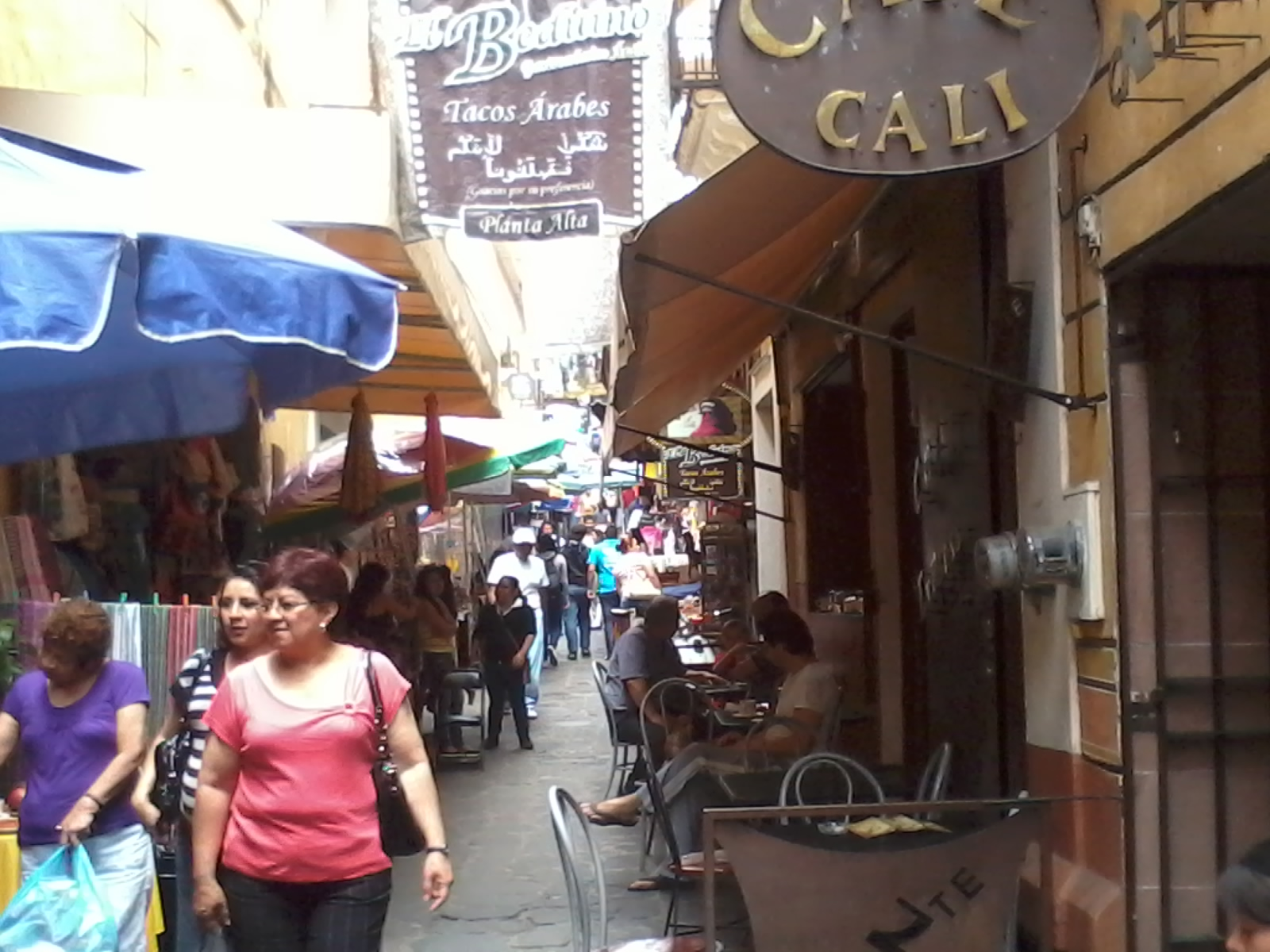
Local businesses in Downtown Xalapa

Xalapa is often called the "Flower Garden of Mexico" and flowers play an important role in the economy. Xalapa is one of the most important places for coffee production in Mexico due to its ideal climate, and coffee beans are grown on both small holdings and large estates in the surrounding mountains. The tobacco industry also forms a part of the local economy with the process of producing cigarettes, and the growing of tropical fruits. Processed foods and beverages are also produced in Xalapa.

Many people in Xalapa are employed by the government, since it is the state capital. Xalapa is also the head one of the five regional sections of the Tribunal Electoral (a level below the Supreme Court). This area encompasses seven states: Campeche, Chiapas, Oaxaca, Quintana Roo, Tabasco, Veracruz and Yucatán. The other regional seats are Mexico City, Toluca, Monterrey and Guadalajara.

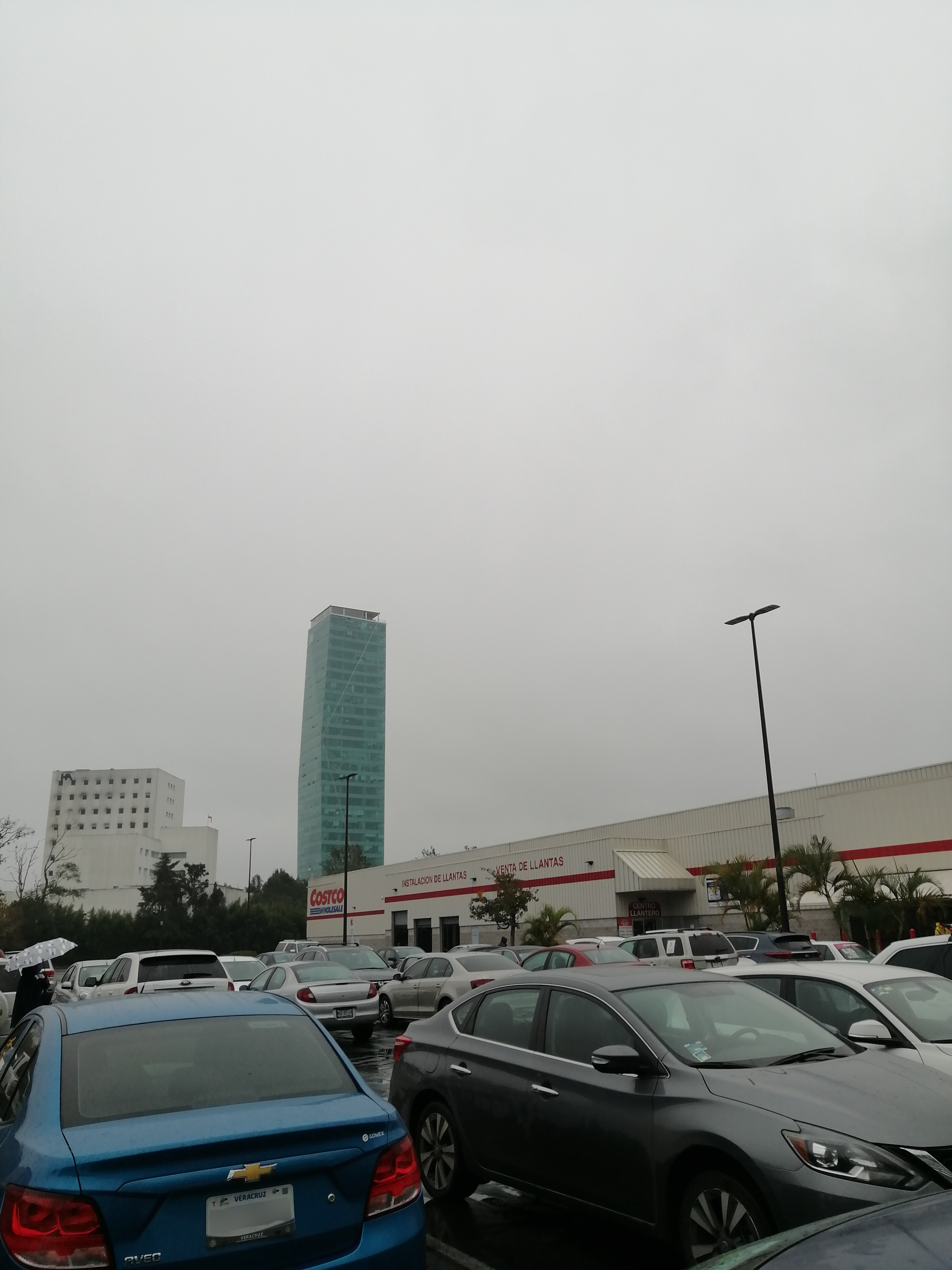
Costco store with Centro Mayor Tower at the bottom

The city is a thriving center for commerce and many multinational companies have large retail stores and franchise restaurants in the city.

Xalapa also has a number of cinemas, some of them of substantial size, such as the Cinepolis Museum (10 screens), Cinepolis the Americas (16 screens), and other cinemas, such as XTreme Cinemas in Crystal and Cinetix in Plaza Animas, which is a local movie theater. There are also several retail malls in Xalapa: Plaza Crystal, Plaza Museo, Plaza Animas (L.A. Fashion), Plaza Américas, and Plaza los Arcos.

The supermarket chain Chedraui is based in Xalapa.

Employment structure in Xalapa in 2005:

Industry sector	Typical professions	% of population
Primary Industry	Farming, cattle ranching, hunting and fishing	4.21
Secondary Industry	Petroleum Mining, extraction and natural gas, manufacturing, industry, electricity, water and construction	19%
Tertiary Industry	Commerce, transport and communications, financial, social and administrative services	70%
Unspecified	–	2.9%

Laguna Verde Nuclear Power Plant (LVNPP) in nearby Alto Lucero, Veracruz, produces about 4.5% of Mexico's electrical energy.

== Culture ==
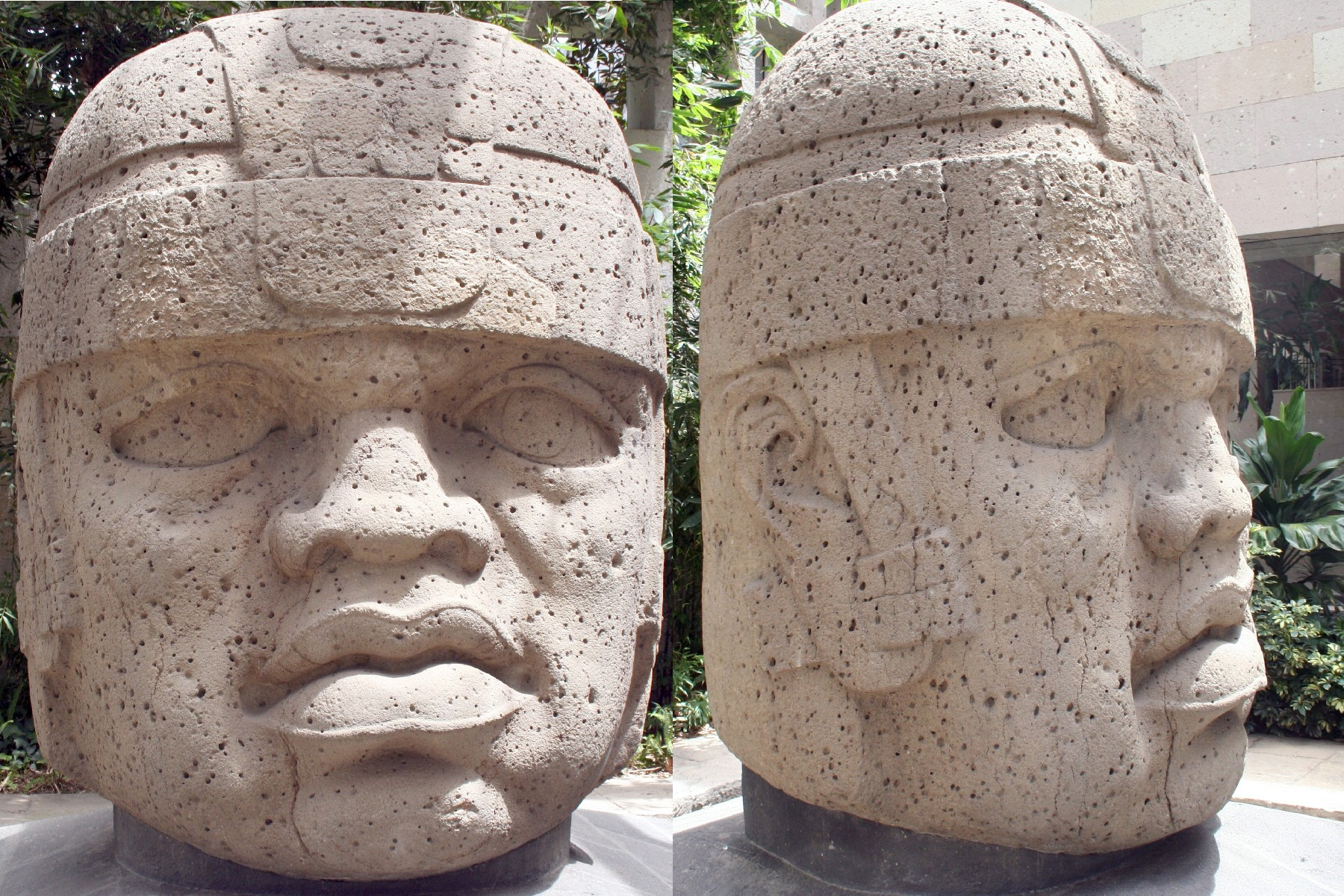
Giant Olmec head, a mark of the indigenous civilizations of Xalapa

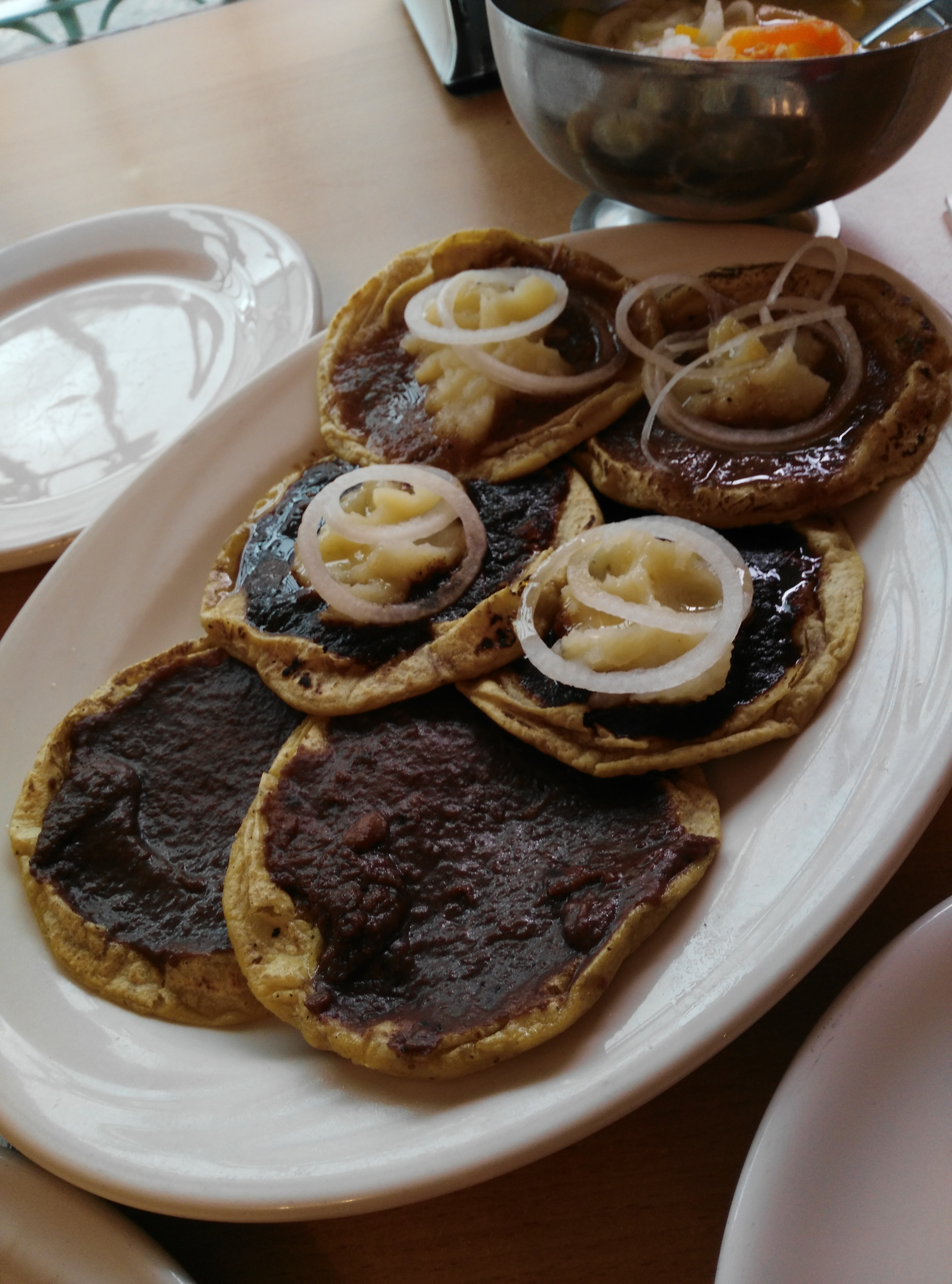
Picadas, a local dish served for breakfast

Xalapa is known as the "Athens of Veracruz" because of the strong cultural influence of its major university, Universidad Veracruzana (the main public university in the State of Veracruz). General Enriquez is known for policies encouraging the educational system in Xalapa.

Culturally, Xalapa has a wide variety of events associated with its theatres, museums, and street art. Many musicians and dancers frequently perform in the center at night, especially on special occasions and events of celebration or commemoration; they often dance the fandango. In 2021, UNESCO recognized Xalapa as a world City of Music, writing that Xalapa "is distinguished by having a strong creative vocation focused on musical culture."

Art has a keen following in Xalapa. The gallery, Pinacoteca Diego Rivera, located near the City Hall and Parque Juárez in downtown, has the most numerous collection of Diego Rivera's paintings in all of Mexico.

=== Holidays ===
Feast day of San José, Feast of Santiago Apostle, Feast of the Immaculate Heart of Jesus, Conception of Maria, and Expo-Fair International are all celebrated in the city. An important religious holiday is on 8 December, the Feast of the Immaculate Conception, celebrating Mary the Mother of God patroness of the city. On 24 October San Rafael Guizar and Valencia are celebrated, with thousands of people from all over Mexico visiting their tomb that is in a chapel within the cathedral. The cathedral remains open all night and day during this event.

=== Cuisine ===
Xalapa is the place of origin of the famous jalapeño peppers. Dishes made with maize — including gorditas, tostadas, pasties, enfrijoladas — and chicken are common. The desserts that are consumed in the region are typically sweet such as cake and cocadas and craft candies like candied fruit, dulce de leche and jamoncillo.

== Notable city landmarks ==
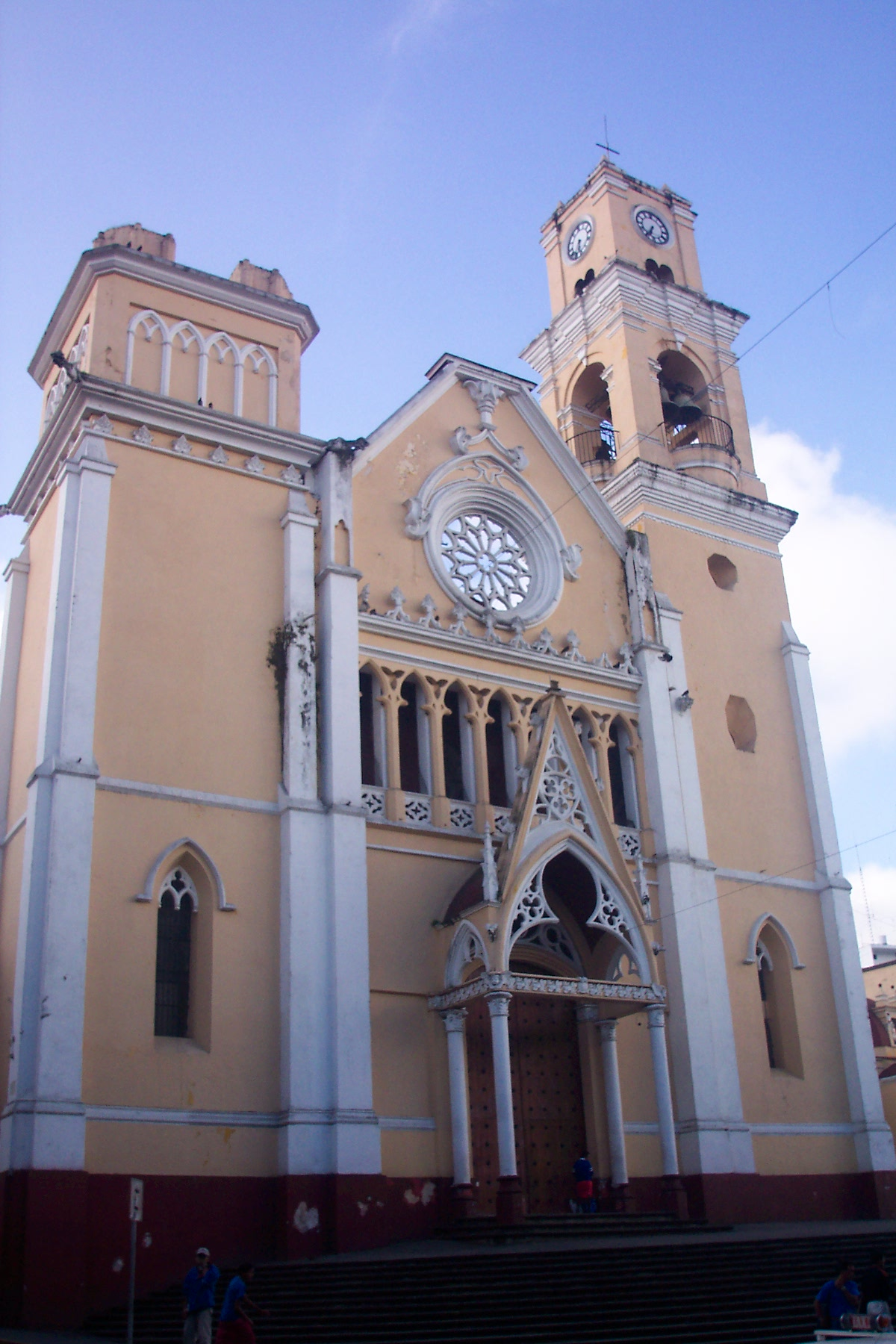
Xalapa Cathedral

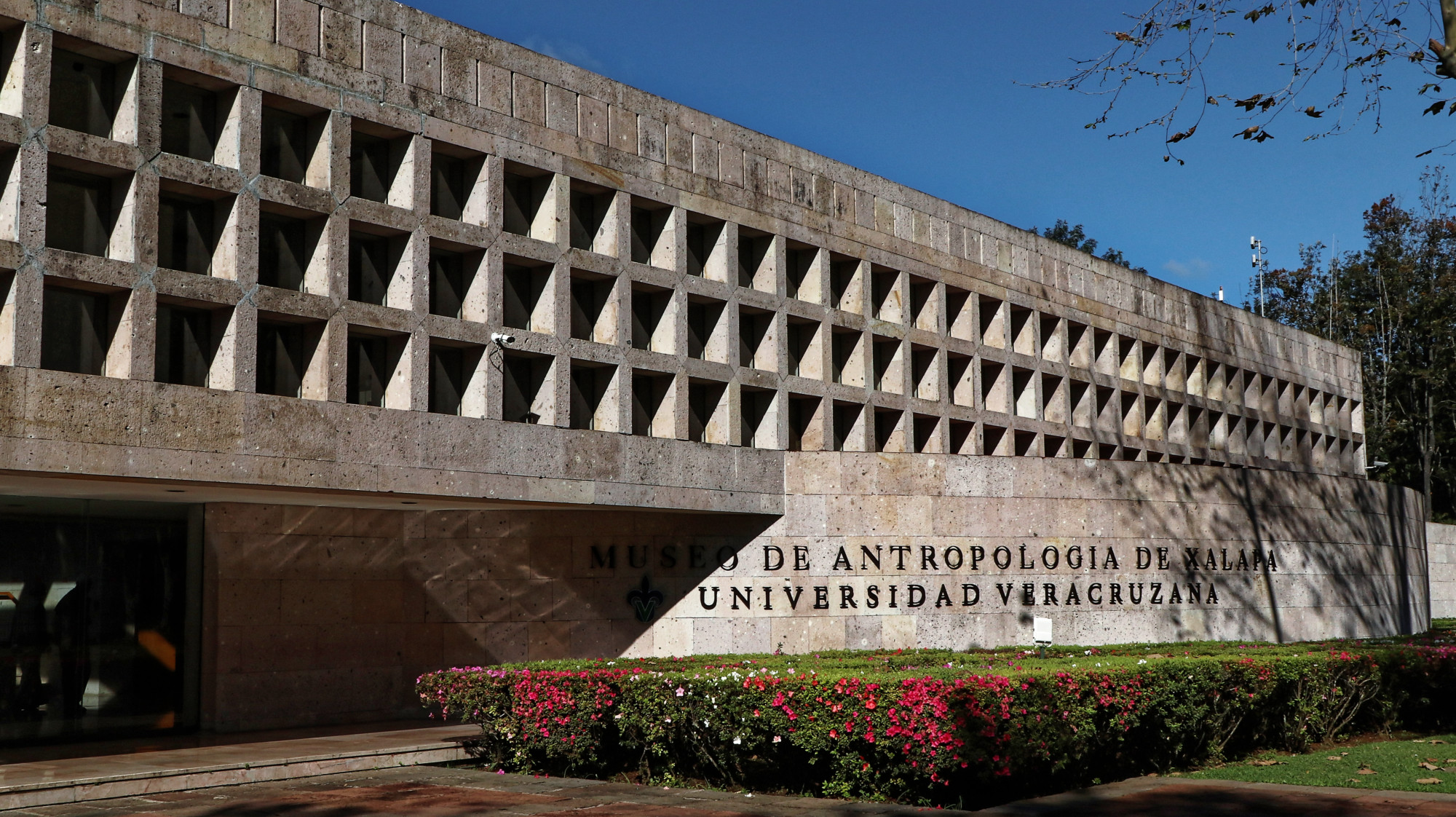
Xalapa Anthropology Museum

- The Xalapa Cathedral is a mix of Baroque and Neo-Gothic design built in 1773. It has a clock tower, the clock is originally from England.
- Callejón Diamante (lit. Diamond Alley) is one of the more crowded streets at night because of its Bohemian atmosphere with cafes and an artists' colony. Callejón Jesús te Ampare is a cobblestone street next to the Church of San José.
- Patio Muñoz is a neighborhood built in the 19th century, with most of the original buildings intact. Here are held workshops in Veracruz-style painting, dance and music.
- Parque Juárez is a park in central Xalapa. Parque Juárez was the location of the Monastery of San Francisco. It is located among the four oldest neighborhoods of the city. Its central garden features enormous monkey puzzle trees, art gallerys, an agora, workshops, an auditorium and a café.
- The Jardín de Esculturas (Sculpture Garden) is a museum dedicated to sculpture, exhibiting works by nationally and internationally recognized artists.
- The Kaná, Museo de Ciencia y Tecnología (Technology and Science Museo) features a planetarium with an IMAX screen, showing educational documentaries.
- In the Paseo de los Lagos, there used to be an ancient dam. Today it has footpaths surrounded by leafy trees, circling three lakes and a fresh-water spring.
- The Parque de los Tecajetes is in a natural depression or ravine of the same name in the center of the city. Underneath is a fresh-water spring that feeds the aqueducts, artificial pools and canals of the park.
- The Xalapa Museum of Anthropology houses the largest collection of artifacts from Mexican Gulf Coast cultures such as the Olmec, the Huastec and the Totonac with more than 25,000 pieces. The most notable pieces in the museum are the giant Olmec heads and the smaller Totonac ones. Some of the pieces in the museum date back to the Early Pre-Classic Period from 1300 BC −900 BC.
- Nearby is the Hacienda del Lencero Its first owner was Juan Lencero, a soldier of Hernán Cortés. In 1842 it was purchased by Antonio López de Santa Anna for 45,000 pesos. Today, it is a museum which displays furniture and personal belongings dating from the 19th century. It also has a chapel, spacious gardens and a lake surrounding the property which include a sculpture by Gabriela Mistral who spent time there while in exile.
- The Jardín Botánico Clavijero (Clavijero Botanical Garden) has an important collection of regional plants with sections dedicated to Mexican ornamental flowers, reconstructed mountain environments in Xalapa, ferns and the most extensive variety of pines in Mexico.

=== Parks and gardens ===
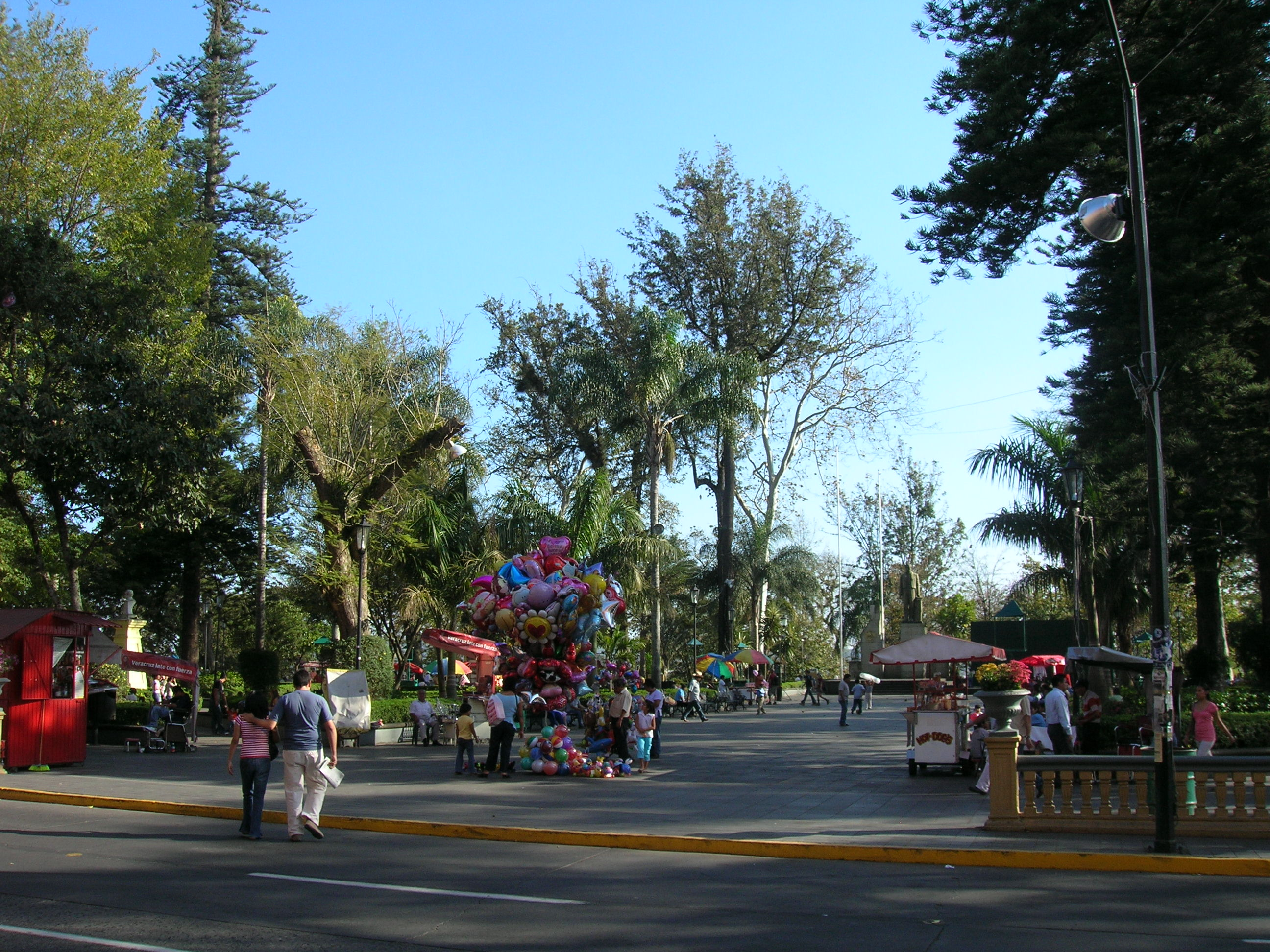
Juárez Park

- Jardín Botánico de Xalapa
- Parque Juárez
- Parque Los Berros
- Parque Ecológico "Cerro del Macuiltépec"
- Paseo de Los Lagos
- Parque Ecológico "El Haya"
- Parque "Natura"
- Jardines de la Universidad Veracruzana
- Parque "Tejar Garnica"
- Jardín de las Esculturas
- Parque Ecológico de Los Tecajetes
- Parque María Enriqueta
- Parque Revolución
- Parque Bicentenario
- Stadium Xalapeño

=== Museums ===
- Xalapa Museum of Anthropology
- Museo Casa de Xalapa
- Kaná, Museo de Ciencia y Tecnología
- Museo del Transporte. Carr.
- Hacienda del Lencero
- Museo del Bombero.
- Museo de la fauna.

=== Galleries ===
- Casa de las Artesanías
- Galería "Ramón Alba de la Canal"
- Agora de la Ciudad
- Pinacoteca Diego Rivera
- Galería de Arte Contemporáneo
- Galería del Centro Recreativo Xalapeño
- Galería Domínguez y Buis
- Galeria Marie Louise Ferrari
- Jardín de Esculturas

=== Theatres and auditoriums ===
- Teatro del Estado
- Sala de Conciertos de la Orquesta Sinfónica de Xalapa
- Teatro J. J. Herrera
- Teatro La Caja
- Auditorio de la Benemérita Escuela Normal Veracruzana

== Sport ==
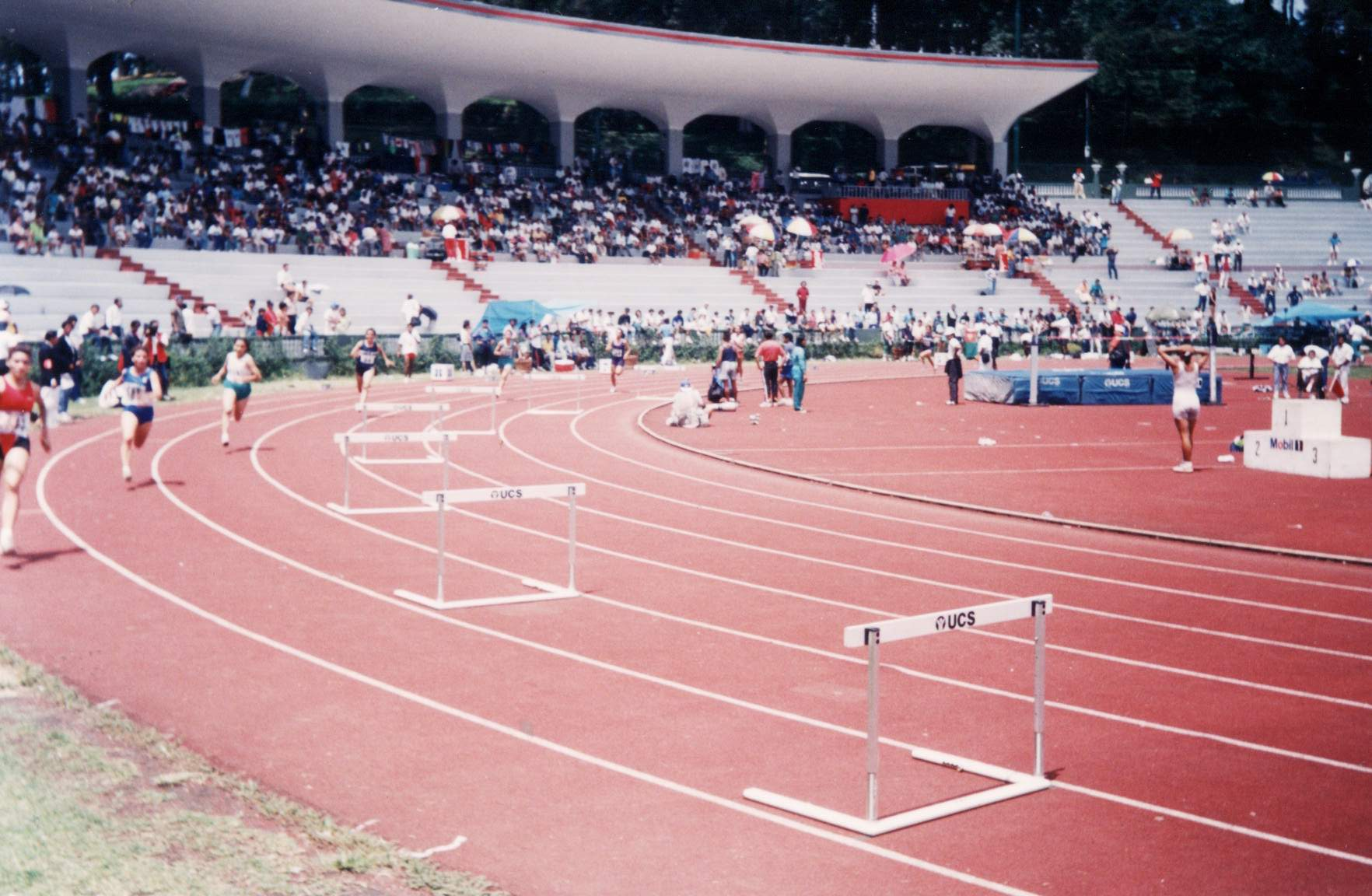
Athletics at Heriberto Jara Corona Stadium in 1991

Xalapa is home to the Halcones UV Xalapa, a very successful professional basketball team. They play in the LNBP

- The team was created in 2003 and placed 3rd in the LNBP
- In 2004 they were champions of the south division, and got second overall in the LNBP
- In 2005 they were champions of the south division and champions of the LNBP
- In 2006 they were champions of the south division, and got second in the LNBP. They also placed second in the Copa Independencia LNBP
- In 2007 – 2008 they were champions of the south division and champions of the LNBP
- In 2008 – 2009 they were champions of the south division and champions of the LNBP. They also placed second in the FIBA de las Americas.

Xalapa also has many sporting facilities. As of 2005, the city has 25 soccer fields, 95 volleyball fields, 95 basketball courts, 36 baseball fields, and 29 multiple-use fields.

Also, the city has 12 gymnasiums, 7 parks, and the notable Heriberto Jara Corona Stadium, inaugurated 1921–1925.

Sportspeople of note hailing from Xalapa include Armando Fernández (an Olympic wrestler), Eulalio Ríos Alemán (an Olympic swimmer and at some time butterfly-stroke record holder in the US, inducted into the Ft. Lauderdale's International Swimming Hall of Fame), and the track and field athlete Luis Hernández.

Every four years the Central American Games take place in cities all over Central America and the Caribbean. In 2012 Veracruz was chosen to host these games in 2014. Several events took place in Xalapa. The Track Cycling was held in the Velodrome, the Modern Pentathlon Swimming took place in the University Swimming Pool, the Athletics trials in the Hilberto Jara Corona Stadium, and Badminton and Table Tennis in the Omega Complex. All of this brought recognition in the sports world to Xalapa.

The Cuban athlete Sandra Mustelier, a member of the table tennis team, decided to flee the hotel where her team was staying two days before the opening of the Central American Games in Veracruz. The 28-year-old athlete did not collect her accreditation in Veracruz, a situation for which her teammates located her immediately by phone. When contacted, Mustelier herself informed her team of her defection. No investigation was undertaken by the Mexican authorities regarding this situation. Mustelier was considered to be a strong contender to win medals in table tennis.

== Transportation ==
The city is connected by the 140-D Highway with the cities of Veracruz, Puebla and Mexico City. Also the 140 Road provides a link between those cities.

Several bus companies are based in Xalapa including Servicio Urbano de Xalapa (SUX); Auto-Transportes Banderilla (ATB); the yellow and green sets of Interbus, Auto-Transportes Miradores Del Mar; and Transportes Rápidos de Veracruz (TRV) amongst many others.

The city of Xalapa is served by a small airport, El Lencero Airport, located 15 minutes by road from the city. It is currently not served by any commercial airline.

== Healthcare ==
The public institutions of the health sector that provide services are:

- Instituto Mexicano del Seguro Social IMSS,
- Instituto de Seguridad y Servicios Sociales de los Trabajadores del Estado ISSSTE,
- Centro de Alta Especialidad CAE (anteriormente Centro de Especialidades Médicas CEM),
- Petróleos Mexicanos PEMEX,
- Secretaría de la Defensa Nacional SDN
- Secretaría de Salud de Veracruz SESVER,
- Centro de Rehabilitación y Educación Especial de Veracruz CREEVER,
- Sistema para el Desarrollo Integral de la Familia DIF.

In the private sector the municipality counts on important medical establishments such as:

- Sanatorio San Francisco,
- Clínica del American Hospital,
- Clínica de especialidades Las Palmas,
- Vital Clínica Hospital,
- Cruz Roja Mexicana,
- Centro Médico de Xalapa,
- Clínica Millenium
- Hospital Ángeles.

== Education ==
=== Universities ===
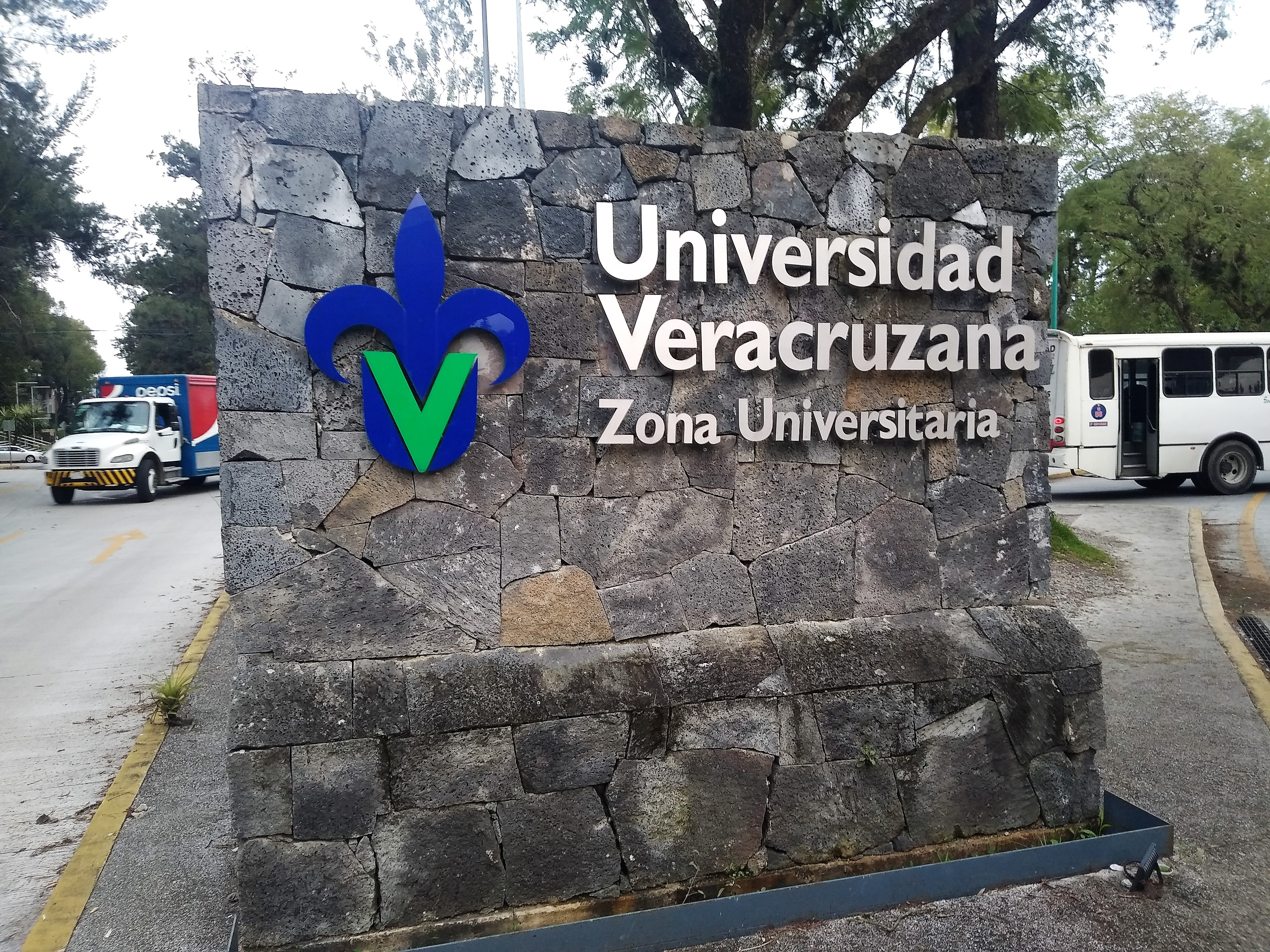
Universidad Veracruzana Main Campus at Xalapa

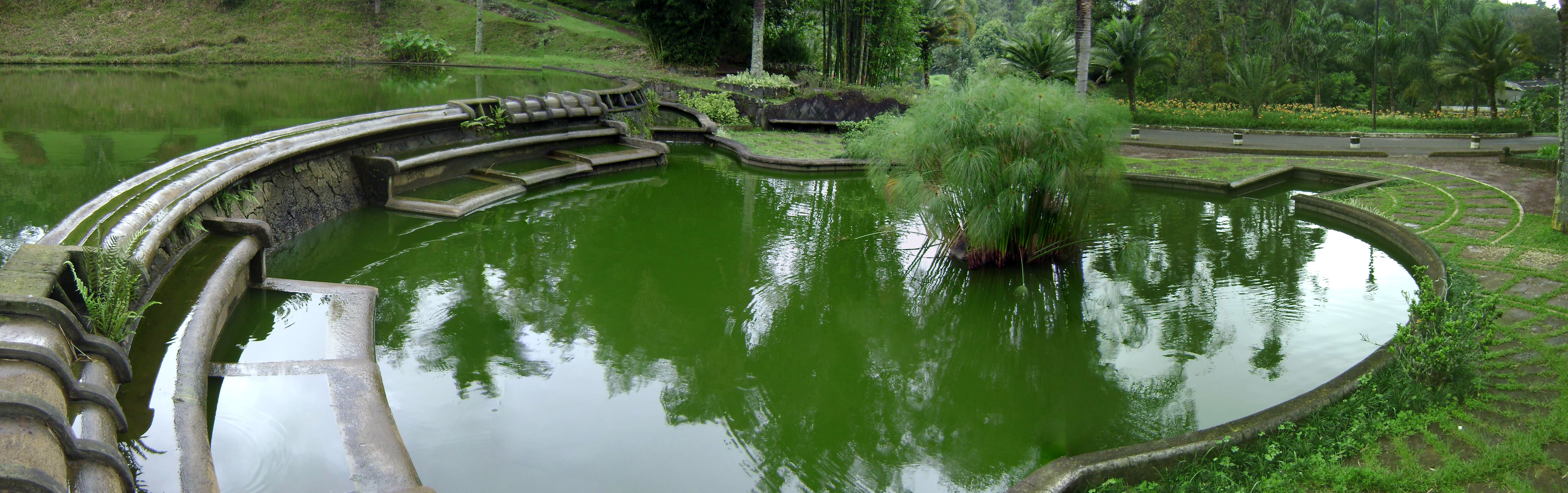
Gardens at Xalapa's Universidad Veracruzana

- Universidad Anáhuac
- Universidad Atenas Veracruzana
- Universidad de América Latina
- Benemérita Escuela Normal Veracruzana "Enrique C. Rébsamen"
- Universidad Cálmecac
- Instituto Culinario de Xalapa
- Centro de Estudios Superiores Hispano-Anglo-Francés
- Universidad CLAES
- El Colegio de Veracruz
- Universidad IVES
- Escuela Libre de Ciencias Políticas y Administración Pública de Ote.
- Escuela de Diseño de Modas Sor Juana Inés de la Cruz
- Universidad Eurohispanoamericana
- Universidad Gestalt
- Universidad del Golfo de México, Campus Xalapa
- Universidad Hernán Cortés
- Instituto de Estudios Superiores Morelos
- Universidad Metropolitana Xalapa
- Instituto Superior de Música del Estado de Veracruz
- Instituto Tecnológico Superior de Xalapa
- Tecnológico de Xalapa
- Universidad Paccioli Xalapa
- Universidad Pedagógica Veracruzana
- Universidad Filadelfia
- Universidad Veracruzana
- Universidad de Xalapa

== Media ==
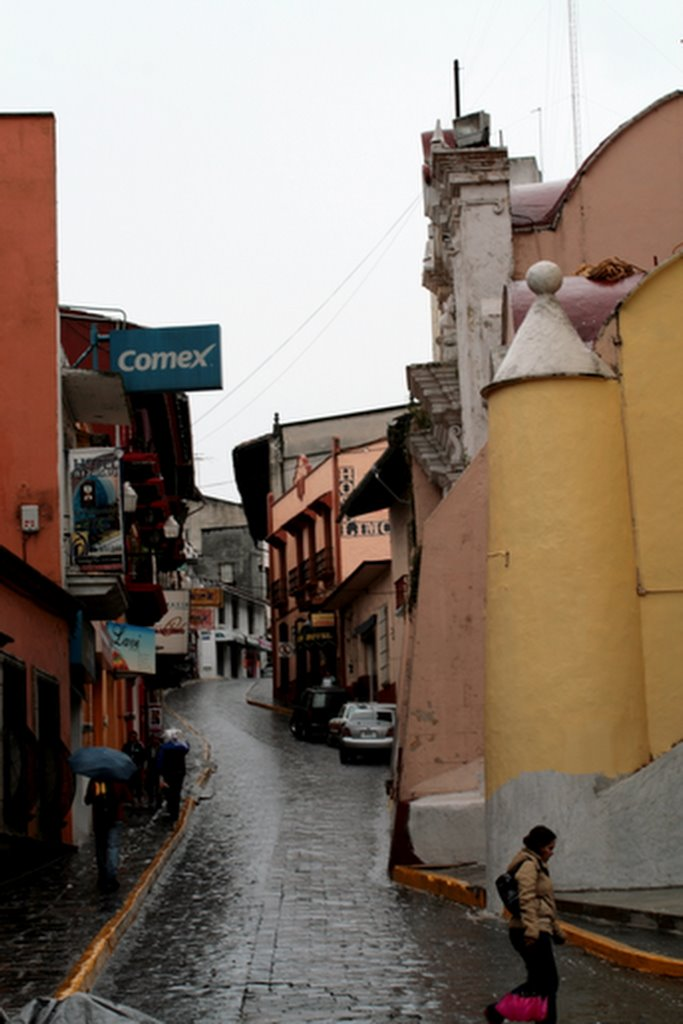
A narrow street in Xalapa, better known as Callejones

=== Newspaper ===
Notable newspapers produced or circulated in Xalapa include www.Xalapa.MX Diario de Xalapa, Diario AZ, Diario el Portal de Xalapa, Diario la Opinión, Periódico Marcha, Periódico Al Calor Político, Periódico Agronómica, Milenio and the Líder. As well, important agency of news on line, like RadioVer www.radiover.com and magazine Revista Era www.revistaera.com t

=== Radio ===
The city is served by numerous radio stations including:

FM:

- 90.5 Radio de la Universidad Veracruzana
- 91.7 Amor (Grupo Acir)
- 95.5 Sensación HD (Oliva Radio)
- 96.9 Digital 96.9 (AvanRadio)
- 97.7 La Máquina (AvanRadio)
- 98.5 ONE FM (AvanRadio)
- 104.9 El Patron FM (Oliva Radio)
- 107.7 Radio Más (Radio-Televisión de Veracruz)

AM:

- 550 W Radio (AvanRadio)
- 610 Ke Buena (AvanRadio)
- 1040 OK Radio (AvanRadio)
- 1130 Yo FM 1130 AM(Grupo Radio Capital)
- 1210 El Patrón (Oliva Radio)
- 1460 ABC Xalapa Radio (Grupo ABC)
- 1550 Radio Universidad Veracruzana

=== Television ===
Television channels include:

- XHGV-TV channel 4 – RTV
- XHAJ-TV channel 5 – Televisa Regional
- XHAH-TV channel 7 – Canal de las Estrellas
- XHAI-TV channel 9 – Canal 5
- XHCPE-TV channel 11 – Azteca 7
- XHIC-TV channel 13 – Azteca 13
- XHCLV-TV channel 22 – Galavisión

== Notable people from Xalapa ==
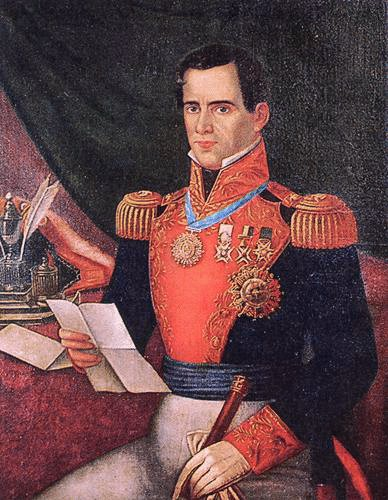
Antonio López de Santa Anna, born in Xalapa, is one of the most emblematic figures in Mexican history.

=== Politicians ===
- Francisco Javier Echeverría
- Sebastián Lerdo de Tejada
- Antonio López de Santa Anna
- José Joaquín de Herrera
- José Luis Oliva Meza
- Francisco Primo de Verdad y Ramos

=== Writers ===
- Juan Díaz Covarrubias
- Raquel Torres Cerdán
- Sergio Galindo

=== Athletes ===
- Barbara Bonola - Triathlete
- Armando Fernández - Wrestler
- Luis Hernández - Athletics, 10,000 meters
- Eulalio Ríos Alemán - Swimmer

=== Artists ===
- Villalobos Brothers – composers, violinists
- Gabriel Orozco – artist
- Son de Madera – musical group
- Rey Alejandro Conde – conductor
- Javier Camarena – opera singer

=== Doctors ===
- Rafael Lucio

=== Benefactors ===
- William K. Boone

== Sister cities ==
- Covina, California, United States
- La Antigua, Guatemalan Highlands, Guatemala
- Matamoros, Tamaulipas, Mexico
- Omaha, Nebraska, United States
- Puebla, Puebla, Mexico
- Toluca, State of Mexico, Mexico
- Torreón, Coahuila, Mexico
- Veracruz, Veracruz, Mexico
