= Presidency of Vicente Fox =

President of Mexico from 2000 to 2006

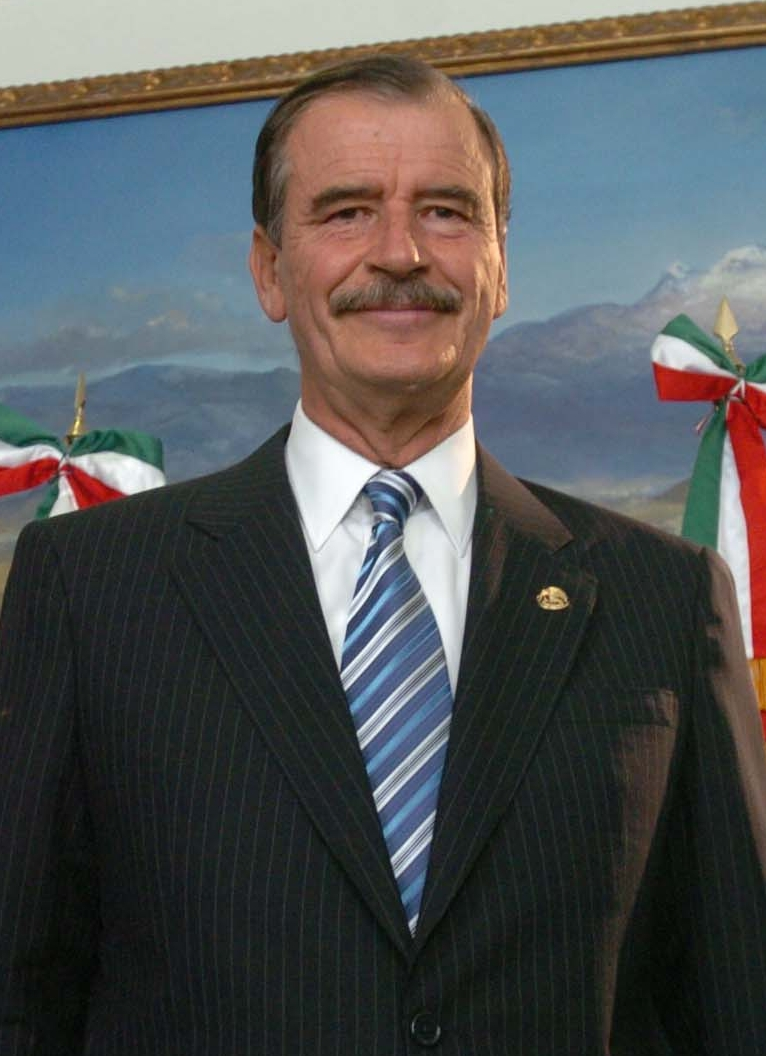
- Presidency of Vicente Fox; December 1, 2000 – November 30, 2006
- Cabinet: see list
- Party: Partido Acción Nacional/PAN
- Election: 2000
- Seat: Los Pinos
- Presidential standard

Vicente Fox's tenure as the President of Mexico began with his Inauguration on December 1, 2000, until his presidency ended on November 30, 2006. His victory in the federal elections in 2000 ended more than 70 years rule of the Institutional Revolutionary Party.

== Cabinet ==
In contrast with his predecessors, President Fox chose the members of his cabinet through head hunters. At the beginning of his term, Fox dubbed his Cabinet as "el gabinetazo" ("the Super Cabinet"), as a way to recognize the capacity of the Cabinet members. Fox had originally stated that the Cabinet chosen at the beginning of his term would last 6 years, throughout his term, however, this did not happen. Felipe Calderón Hinojosa served as Secretary of Energy for eight months, and resigned under pressure relating to his presidential ambitions, when competing against Secretary of the Interior, Santiago Creel.

Office	Name	Term
President	Vicente Fox Quesada	2000–2006
Interior	Santiago Creel Miranda; Carlos Abascal	2000–2005; 2005–2006
Foreign Affairs	Jorge Castañeda; Luis Ernesto Derbez	2000–2003; 2003–2006
Public Safety	Alejandro Gertz Manero; Ramón Martín Huerta; Eduardo Medina-Mora	2000–2004; 2004–2005; 2005–2006
Attorney General	Rafael Macedo de la Concha; Daniel Cabeza de Vaca	2000–2005; 2005–2006
Health	Julio Frenk	2000–2006
Education	Reyes Tamez	2000–2006
Economy	Luis Ernesto Derbez; Fernando Canales Clariond; Sergio García de Alba	2000–2003; 2003–2005; 2005–2006
Labor	Carlos Abascal; Francisco Salazar	2000–2005; 2005–2006
Agriculture	Javier Usabiaga; Francisco Mayorga	2000–2005; 2005–2006
Energy	Ernesto Martens; Felipe Calderón; Fernando Elizondo; Fernando Canales Clariond	2000–2003; 2003–2004; 2004–2005; 2005–2006
Finance	Francisco Gil Díaz	2000–2006
Communications	Pedro Cerisola	2000–2006
Defense	Gerardo Clemente Vega	2000–2006
Navy	Marco Antonio Peyrot	2000–2006
Presidential Guard	José Armando Tamayo García	2000–2006
Social Development	Josefina Vázquez Mota; Ana Teresa Aranda	2005–2006; 2006
Environment	Víctor Lichtinger; Alberto Cárdenas Jiménez; José Luis Luege Tamargo	2000–2003; 2003–2005; 2005–2006
Tourism	Leticia Navarro; Rodolfo Elizondo Torres	2000–2003; 2003–2006
Civil Service	Francisco Barrio; Eduardo Romero Ramos	2000–2003; 2003–2006

== Economy ==
Fox was one of the few presidents to avoid a major economic upheaval, although the economy grew at the slowest pace in history, second only to the de la Madrid administration.

=== Currency and inflation ===
Mexico experienced some level of currency devaluation at the end of three of the four presidential terms from 1970 to 1994. Ernesto Zedillo floated the peso at the beginning of his term (1994–2000). Zedillo passed the office to Fox without an economic emergency. In 2006, Vicente Fox, like Zedillo in 2000, left office without a significant devaluation.

According to Banco de México (Mexico's Central Bank), inflation rates during Fox's term went from 11%, in January 2000, at the beginning of his term, to 4.05% in December 2006. During most of Fox's term, inflation was consistently below 6%, mostly around 4.5%. According to the Central Bank, inflation hadn't been that low since before 1973 (the lowest inflation between 1973 and 1999 was above 6%, frequently reaching double and even sometimes triple-digits). Mexico created an estimated 1 million new jobs in 2006, a record.

=== Growth ===
GDP growth dropped from an average of 5.1% in the Zedillo administration to the lowest in a decade, an average of 2.2% during Fox's administration. According to Fox's first government report address (equivalent to the state of the union address in the United States), affected sectors were mining (−1.5% growth), manufacturing (−2.28% growth), and construction (−5.36%), while electricity, gas and water (1.76% growth) and services (2.65%) did not decrease.

Fox's cabinet blamed the low growth on the slowdown of the Economy of the United States, but that country started growing again in 2002–2003. Mexico did not grow at the same pace and was surpassed by China as the second-largest trade partner of the United States. Fox had promised growth of 7% during his campaign and blamed Congress for the low economic growth but his administration had foreseen growth of 3.4% even without the approval of structural reforms, especially fiscal reforms.

Tax revenue as a proportion of GDP fell from 10.6% at the beginning of his administration to 9.7% at the end of his term. In contrast with previous administrations, as a proportion of GDP debt did not grow during Fox's term.

=== Employment and income ===
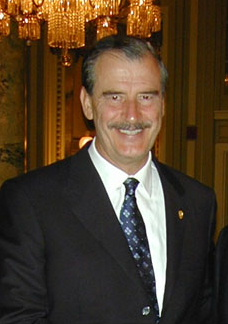
Vicente Fox

Minimum wages during Fox's administration increased at a nominal rate of 34% from $35.12 pesos per day in 2000 to $47.05 in 2006. However, Purchasing Power Parity (PPP) terms, real wages decreased 3.8%, from $80.27 to $77.07. According to Banco de México, this compares favorably to previous administrations, for wages had decreased by 75% from $296.22 PPP pesos per day in January 1976, to $73.91 PPP pesos per day in December 1999. Minimum wages had decreased, in real terms, an average of 38% per Presidential administration from 1976 to 2000.

During Fox's term, the number of registered taxpayers grew by 35%. According to data by the Tributary Administration Service, the main driver behind this increase was salaried workers, starting in 2004, which grew by 217% compared to 2000. The more than 12 million salaried workers who are registered to pay tax constitute 56% of the taxpaying base.

Job creation stalled during Fox's first four years. According to the Economist Intelligence Unit not only were no jobs created from 2000 to 2004 but the number of street vendors increased 40%. This workforce does not pay income or sales tax and significant minority participates in illicit activities such as smuggling and piracy. The latter grew during Fox's term to an 8 billion industry. Net sales of the clothing industry in Mexico is calculated at approximately 1,500 million dollars, of which 910 million are from smuggled clothing.

The number of registered workers affiliated to the Mexican Social Security Institute decreased from 11,026,370 in December 2000 to 10,881,160. Unemployment increased from 2.7% in 2002 to 3.2 in 2003, and the number of non-payroll workers increased to 20 million people or roughly half of the population able to work. Jobs in maquiladoras decreased by 30%

In 2002, Mexico reached a GDP per capita of 9,381 dollars per year and thus became a medium-high income country. Five years later, Mexico upgraded from beneficiary to full contributor to the United Nations Development Program.

=== Finance and investments ===
Housing was among Fox's top priorities. By 2006, the Infonavit, the federal fund for workers' housing, had 60% "market share" in the mortgage business, granting 435,000 credits a year, with an expected yearly growth of 24%.

During Fox's presidency, the Mexican Stock Exchange reached record highs throughout his term. The record highs were caused by a better economic outlook throughout his term, larger foreign currency reserves, and a better debt rating that lowered interest rates.

Mexico suffered a drop in competitiveness during Fox's administration. In 2006, Mexico ranked 56th of 60 countries in the World Competitiveness Yearbook due to poor infrastructure, ease of doing business and high manufacturing costs such as electricity. Fox's large investment in infrastructure did not translate in lower costs, because of a lack of coordination between government bodies. To address this in 2004, Fox launched an Economic Policy for Competitivity ("Política Económica para la Competitividad" or PEC) however, improvement is not expected until after 2013.

== Human development ==
Human Development Index (HDI) in Mexico
Year	HDI	Annual increase (%)
1975	0.689	1.335
1985	0.755	0.544
1990	0.764	0.238
1995	0.782	0.471
2000	0.809	0.206
2003	0.814	

Human Development Index (HDI) in Latin America (2003)
Country	HDI	2000–2003 increase (%)
Argentina	0.863	0.82
Chile	0.854	1.30
Uruguay	0.840	—
Costa Rica	0.838	0.72
Cuba	0.817	—
Mexico	0.814	0.62
Panama	0.804	1.26
Venezuela	0.772	0

The Human Development Index (HDI) is a comparative measure of life expectancy, literacy, education, and standard of living for countries worldwide. The table on the right shows Mexico's Human Development Index (HDI) from 1975 to 2003 along with yearly percentage increases.

HDI improved in the first three years of the Fox administration 0.206% annually, .62% in total, the lowest increase in almost three decades. During the last year of the Zedillo administration Mexico reached, for the first time in history, a HDI of 0.8 which is considered to represent high development. During that period countries such as Canada, France and Great Britain reported low increases and even some decreases while Cuba surpassed Mexico at 0.817, Costa Rica reached 0.838, Argentina scored 0.863 and Brazil increased 1.17%.

== Relations with Congress ==
In his inaugural speech, Fox said that his presidency marked a new era of relations between the three political branches. "The President will propose, and the Congress will dispose", he said. This implied that Fox would respect the separation of powers and negotiate with Congress.

The first major controversy occurred during the discussion of comprehensive tax reform that included a value added tax of 15% on all products, including food and medicine, to replace the complex system of discretionary exceptions that still exists today. Congress rejected Fox's proposal.

From then on, relation between the Legislative and the Executive were strained. Lawmakers from opposition parties admitted they had a hard time dealing with Fox, while lawmakers from Fox's party claimed that there were "legislative excesses".

In his final state of the union address in September 2006, leftist lawmakers prevented Fox from speaking. He became the first president to not read his report before Congress and instead gave a televised address to the nation.

=== Investigations ===
Congress opened two investigations but has failed to produce evidence to prosecute the Bribiescas. During one of the investigations Fox called the deputies "delinquents". A third congressional investigation was announced in May 2007.

== Foreign policy ==
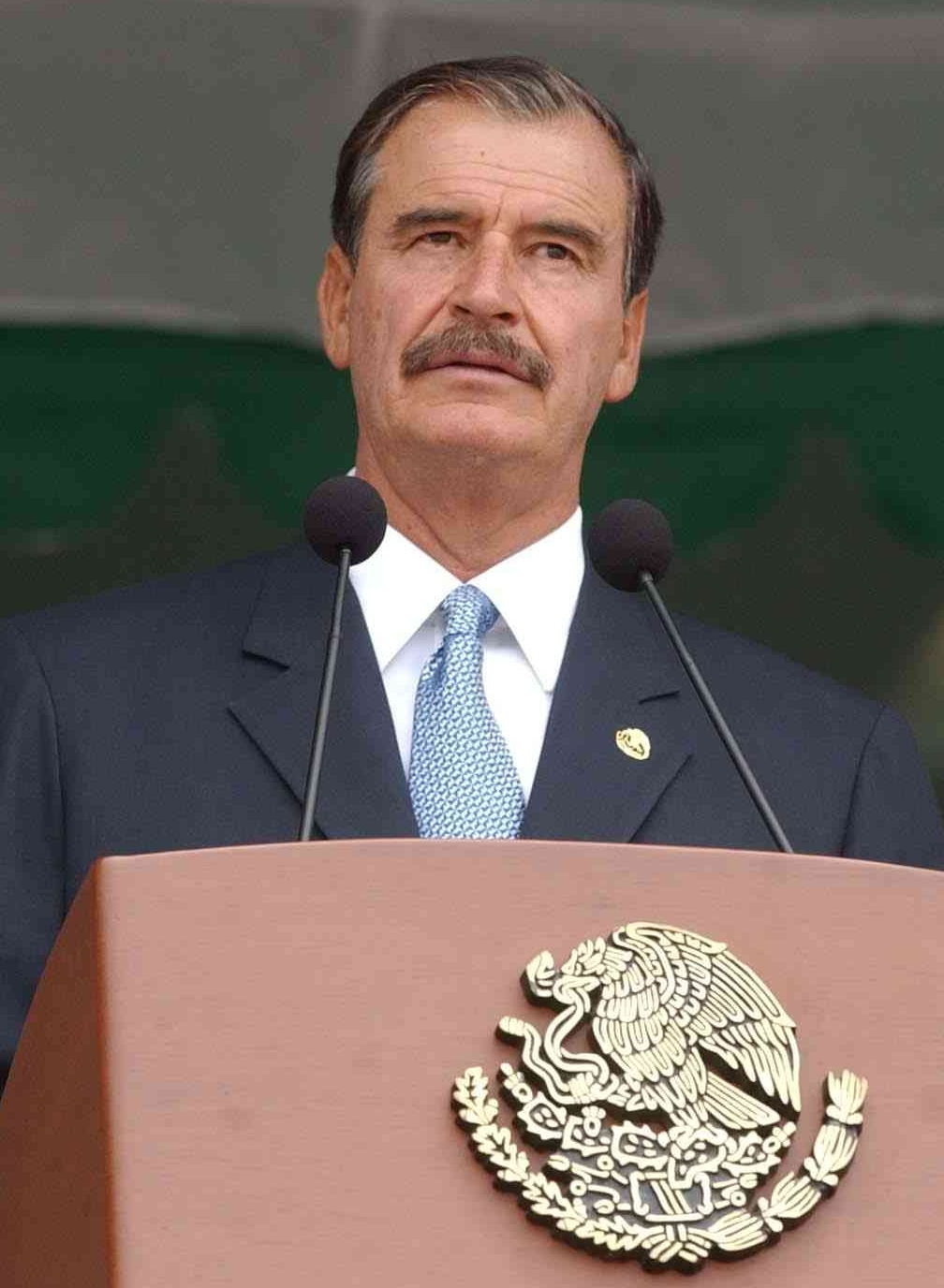

Before Vicente Fox, Mexico practiced the Estrada Doctrine, so named after its creator, Genaro Estrada (Secretary of Foreign Affairs during the Presidency of Pascual Ortiz Rubio). The Estrada Doctrine favored an enclosed view of sovereignty. It claimed that foreign governments should not judge, for good or bad, governments or changes in governments in other nations, because it would imply a breach of their sovereignty.

President Fox appointed Jorge Castañeda to be his Secretary of Foreign Affairs. Castañeda immediately broke with the Estrada Doctrine, promoting what was called by critics the Castañeda Doctrine. The new foreign policy called for an openness and an acceptance of criticism from the international community, and the increase of national involvement in foreign affairs.

During Fox's term, Mexico actively sought (and gained) a temporary seat on the UN Security Council. However, Luis Ernesto Derbez, Secretary of Foreign Affairs after Castañeda, unsuccessfully ran for the position of Secretary General of the Organization of American States, losing to Chilean José Miguel Insulza.

Mexico hosted several international summits during Fox's administration. The Monterrey Summit of 2001 adopted the so-called Monterrey Consensus. President Fox and his Foreign Relations cabinet were protagonists of one of the most serious diplomatic controversies of his administration. At the Summit, many heads of State were invited to the International Conference on Financing for Development. Early in the meeting Cuban President Fidel Castro surprisingly stood and said that he was leaving the city because of "a special situation created by my participation in this Summit". Fox repeatedly denied Castro's subsequent allegations that he was asked to leave, responding to a U.S. request. Several weeks after the incident, a recording of a phone call between Fox and Castro where the Mexican president asks Castro to leave before George Bush arrived at the summit was leaked to the press.

=== Relations with the United States ===
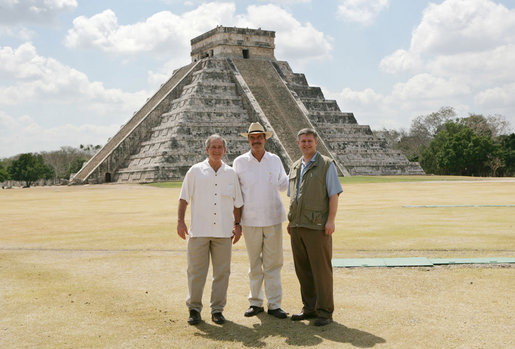
US President George W. Bush, Fox and Canada's Prime Minister Stephen Harper stand in front of "El Castillo", Chichen Itza on Thursday, March 30, 2006.

Several media pundits and think tanks like COHA judged the Castañeda Doctrine "overtly submissive" to the United States. COHA's opinion was based on Mexico's support of Guatemala for a seat in the UN Security council, instead of supporting Venezuela, the contending candidate for the seat.

==== Immigration ====
During Fox's administration, Mexico pushed for "comprehensive" reform of U.S. immigration law that addressed the problem of Illegal immigration to the United States. The issue had been called "The Whole Enchilada" by Fox's administration, which stated that "immigration reform in the United States should address mutual border problems, the rights of undocumented immigrants, and the development of regions in Mexico that 'expel' migrants". However, according to former U.S. ambassador to Mexico Jeffrey Davidow, all discussions between the parties on immigration were informal.

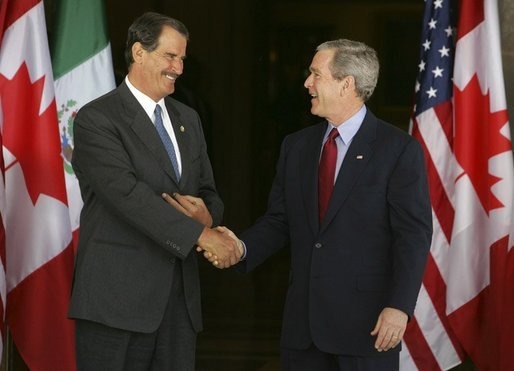
Vicente Fox with George W. Bush

The immigration reform that Fox sought included a guest worker plan. Fox said, "The best thing that can happen to both our countries is to have an orderly flow, a controlled flow, of migration to the United States". This reform was supported by President Bush and approved by the U.S. Senate, however, the bill was rejected by the House of Representatives. According to the Washington Post, the hopes were complicated by the recent approval of the SBI (Secure Border Initiative), a bill that includes building a 700-mile (1,100 km) triple fence between the U.S. and Mexico.

During Fox's presidency the net migration rate in Mexico increased 152% from −2.84 migrants per 1,000 inhabitants to −4.32; in the same period, population growth decreased 35% from 1.57% to 1.16%. Fox, who was said to be "proud" of Mexican immigrants in the U.S. has acknowledged the importance of remittances by both legal and illegal Mexican workers in the U.S. (now the #1 source of revenue for the country).

=== Castañeda Doctrine ===
Andrés Manuel López Obrador criticized the "Castañeda Doctrine", saying that Mexico should not "get involved in the internal lives of other people, because we do not want other people involved in our internal lives". Indeed, the new foreign policy doctrine openly invited other nations to scrutinize Mexican affairs, criticizing the Estrada Doctrine as offering an excuse to ignore foreign criticism. Finally, José Galán, an editorialist in La Jornada, accused the Fox administration of not doing enough to stop border violence against Mexican nationals.

=== Iraq War ===
During the country's tenure as a rotating member of the UN Security Council, Mexico did not support the U.S-led 2003 invasion of Iraq,

=== Plan Puebla Panama ===
Fox promoted a regional development initiative called Plan Puebla Panama, later renamed Proyecto Mesoamérica, which focused on infrastructure, economic development and growth, and market connections between Mexico and seven Central American economies. The pro-business orientation of the plan faced criticism from the Zapatista rebels and some civil society groups in Central America. The plan envisioned US$20 billion over 25 years to create a development corridor, funded in part through matching funds from the private sector and from international financial institutions. Fox's successor Felipe Calderón expressed interest in continuing the plan but gave it no new funding midway through his term in office.

==== 2005 Summit at Mar del Plata ====
The Fourth Summit of the Americas took place on November 4 and the 5th in Mar del Plata, Argentina. Fox assisted with the other 33 presidents of countries in the Americas. Fox attempted to restart talks on the Free Trade Area of the Americas (FTAA). However, discussion on the FTAA was not in the agenda of the Summit.

Upon his arrival Hugo Chávez, president of Venezuela, declared:

Today the FTAA is dead and we are going to bury it here. We are here to change the course of history.

Fox responded that the FTAA could be created with all of the countries in the Americas with the exception of Venezuela or the countries of the Mercosur.

Marco Aurelio Garcia, one of Brazilian President Luiz Inácio Lula da Silva's closest advisers, declared that Fox was too hasty in supporting the FTAA. Garcia declared that Fox's comment that the FTAA would be created with or without the Mercosur angered many. Fox did not applaud after Argentine President Kirchner's presentation, and when Fox attempted to raise the issue of the FTAA, Kirchner retorted that the FTAA was not on the Summit agenda. Fox responded to the press declaring that Kirchner was more concerned with pleasing people in his country than the success of the Summit. Kirchner replied that Fox should attend to the Mexicans because it was the Argentine people who voted for him.

The parliamentary groups of the PAN, PRI, PRD and PVEM in the Senate approved a motion to express their disillusionment about the performance of Fox and Derbez, his Secretary of Foreign Affairs, at the Summit.

=== Official international trips ===
This is a list of official trips abroad made by Fox during his presidency.

According to Article 88 of the Constitution of Mexico, the president may leave the country for up to seven days by informing the Senate or, where applicable, the Permanent Commission in advance of the reasons for the absence, as well as of the results of the measures carried out. For absences longer than seven days, permission from the Senate or the Permanent Commission is required.

Date	Destination	Main purpose
2000
No official foreign visits
2001
24–26 January	Zürich and Davos (Switzerland)	Participation in the World Economic Forum.
27–28 January	Milan (Italy)	Working meeting on the industrialization of Lombardy and the Four Motors for Europe.
29–30 January	Frankfurt (Germany)	Meeting with the Chamber of Commerce and the president of the European Central Bank.
21–23 March	Sacramento, Fresno and Los Angeles (United States)	Working tour.
5–6 April	Bogotá (Colombia)	State visit and Summit of the Group of Three.
7–8 April	Caracas (Venezuela)	State visit.
18–24 April	Ottawa, Montreal and Quebec City (Canada)	State visit and participation in the 3rd Summit of the Americas.
3–4 May	Washington, D.C. (United States)	Working visit.
3–5 June	Busan, Ulsan and Seoul (South Korea)	State visit.
5–6 June	Tokyo (Japan)	Working visit.
6–9 June	Beijing, Xi'an and Shanghai (China)	State visit.
14 June	San Salvador (El Salvador)	State visit.
15–17 June	Panama City (Panama)	State visit and participation in the Tuxtla Mechanism summit.
5–7 July	Nassau (Bahamas)	Special guest at the CARICOM summit.
13–17 July	Detroit, Milwaukee, Chicago and Sun Valley (United States)	Working tour.
16–18 August	Santiago (Chile)	Participation in the 15th Summit of the Rio Group.
4–7 September	Washington, D.C. and Toledo (United States)	State visit. Addressed a joint session of Congress.
19–25 September	New York (United States)	Participation in the Extraordinary Session of the United Nations.
4 October	Washington, D.C. (United States)	Working meeting with President George W. Bush.
9 October	New York (United States)	Working visit.
10–11 October	Prague (Czech Republic)	State visit.
12 October	Hamburg (Germany)	Working visit.
13–16 October	Madrid, Toledo and Valladolid (Spain)	State visit.
16–18 October	Rome (Italy)	State visit.
18 October	Vatican City (Vatican City)	State visit.
19–21 October	Shanghai (China)	Participation in the 13th APEC summit.
21–22 October	Ulaanbaatar (Mongolia)	Working visit.
8–11 November	New York (United States)	Participation in the United Nations General Assembly.
17–18 November	Lima (Peru)	Participation in the 11th Ibero-American Summit.
2002
3–4 February	Havana (Cuba)	Working visit.
11–12 April	San José (Costa Rica)	Participation in the 16th Summit of the Rio Group.
8–9 May	New York (United States)	Working visit.
13–14 May	Brussels (Belgium)	Working visit and meeting with authorities of the European Union.
15 May	Strasbourg (France)	Address before the European Parliament.
16–18 May	Madrid and Valencia (Spain)	State visit and participation in the Latin America, the Caribbean and European Union Summit.
2–4 July	Brasília (Brazil)	State visit.
4–5 July	Buenos Aires (Argentina)	State visit.
5 July	Montevideo (Uruguay)	Working visit.
2–4 September	Johannesburg (South Africa)	Participation in the World Summit on Sustainable Development.
4–5 September	Abuja (Nigeria)	State visit.
10 November	New York (United States)	Working visit.
10–12 November	London (United Kingdom)	State visit.
12–13 November	Dublin (Ireland)	State visit.
13–15 November	Paris (France)	State visit.
15–16 November	Bávaro (Dominican Republic)	Participation in the 12th Ibero-American Summit.
2003
23–26 January	Zürich and Davos (Switzerland)	Participation in the World Economic Forum.
26–29 January	The Hague and Rotterdam (Netherlands)	State visit.
29–31 January	Berlin and Munich (Germany)	State visit.
21–24 May	Lima and Cusco (Peru)	State visit and participation in the 17th Summit of the Rio Group.
30 May – 1 June	Évian-les-Bains (France)	Invited, together with the heads of state of China, India, South Africa, and Brazil, to the 29th G8 summit.
2–3 June	Stockholm (Sweden)	State visit.
23–25 September	New York (United States)	Participation in the United Nations General Assembly.
14–17 October	Tokyo and Osaka (Japan)	State visit.
18–21 October	Bangkok (Thailand)	Participation in the 15th APEC summit.
4–6 November	Phoenix, Santa Fe and Austin (United States)	Working tour.
14–15 November	Santa Cruz de la Sierra (Bolivia)	Participation in the 13th Ibero-American Summit.
2004
5–6 March	Crawford (United States)	Working meeting with President George W. Bush.
23–24 March	Guatemala City (Guatemala)	State visit.
24–25 March	Tegucigalpa (Honduras)	State visit.
25–26 March	Managua (Nicaragua)	State visit and participation in the Tuxtla Mechanism summit.
11 May	Bern (Switzerland)	Working visit.
11–13 May	Budapest (Hungary)	State visit.
13–15 May	Warsaw (Poland)	State visit.
16–18 June	Chicago, Detroit and Minneapolis (United States)	Working tour.
6–8 July	Puerto Iguazú (Argentina)	Special guest at the Mercosur summit.
8–9 July	Brasília (Brazil)	Working visit.
9–10 July	Asunción (Paraguay)	Working visit.
24–26 October	Ottawa (Canada)	State visit.
2–4 November	Panama City (Panama)	Working visit.
4–6 November	Rio de Janeiro (Brazil)	Participation in the 18th Summit of the Rio Group.
18–19 November	San José (Costa Rica)	Participation in the 14th Ibero-American Summit.
20–21 November	Santiago (Chile)	Participation in the 16th APEC summit.
21–22 November	Quito (Ecuador)	State visit.
6–9 December	Lima and Cusco (Peru)	Special guest at the summits of the Andean Community and of heads of state and government of South America.
9–10 December	La Paz (Bolivia)	State visit.
14–15 December	San Salvador (El Salvador)	Special guest at the Summit of Heads of State and Government of the Central American Integration System.
2005
7–10 February	Madrid (Spain)	State visit.
10–11 February	Rome (Italy)	State visit.
11–12 February	Rabat (Morocco)	State visit.
12–13 February	Algiers (Algeria)	State visit.
23–24 March	Crawford and Waco (United States)	Participation in the North American Leaders' Summit.
6–7 April	Rome (Italy)	Working visit.
8–9 April	Vatican City (Vatican City)	Attendance at the Funeral of Pope John Paul II.
2–3 May	La Paz (Bolivia)	State visit.
3–4 May	Kingston (Jamaica)	Working visit.
18–20 June	Kyiv (Ukraine)	State visit.
20–22 June	Moscow (Russia)	State visit.
28–30 June	Belmopan (Belize)	State visit and participation in the Tuxtla Mechanism summit.
5–8 July	Perthshire (United Kingdom)	Invited, together with the heads of state of China, India, South Africa, and Brazil, to the 31st G8 summit.
28–30 July	Panama City (Panama)	State visit and participation in the summit of the Association of Caribbean States.
13–15 September	New York (United States)	Participation in the annual session of the United Nations.
29–30 September	Vancouver and Calgary (Canada)	Working visit.
14–15 October	Salamanca (Spain)	Participation in the 15th Ibero-American Summit.
2–4 November	San José (Costa Rica)	State visit.
4–6 November	Mar del Plata (Argentina)	Participation in the 4th Summit of the Americas and the 19th Summit of the Rio Group.
16–19 November	Busan (South Korea)	Participation in the 17th APEC summit.
2006
25–27 January	Santiago (Chile)	Working visit.
27 January	Tegucigalpa (Honduras)	Invited to the inauguration of Manuel Zelaya.
8 May	San José (Costa Rica)	Invited to the inauguration of Óscar Arias.
9–13 May	Vienna (Austria)	State visit and participation in the 4th Summit of Heads of State and Government of Latin America and the Caribbean and the European Union, as well as in a Mexico–European Union summit.
13–14 May	Bratislava (Slovakia)	State visit.
23–27 May	Salt Lake City, Seattle, Los Angeles (United States)	Working tour.
1–3 June	La Romana (Dominican Republic)	Participation in the 2nd summit of the Mesoamerican Energy Initiative.
11–13 July	Panama City (Panama)	Participation in the 8th Summit of the Tuxtla Dialogue and Coordination Mechanism, as well as in the 28th Ordinary Meeting of the Member Countries of the Central American Integration System (SICA).
15–18 July	Saint Petersburg (Russia)	Invited, together with the heads of state of China, India, South Africa, and Brazil, to the G8 summit; on this occasion, in the framework of a parallel meeting, these nations were referred to as the G5.
18–19 July	Madrid and Santander (Spain)	Working tour.
18–20 September	New York (United States)	Participation in the ordinary annual session of the United Nations.
9–10 October	Guatemala City (Guatemala)	Working tour.
3–4 November	Montevideo (Uruguay)	Participation in the 16th Ibero-American Summit.

== Education, science, and technology ==
According to René Drucker, coordinator of basic science research for National Autonomous University of Mexico (UNAM), "no other government in recent history has neglected research in the basic sciences as Fox's". Fox's plan for the Consejo Nacional de Ciencia y Tecnología, (CONACYT), was that by 2006 this organization would receive 1% of GDP. However the budget for this organization for 2006 reached only 0.33%. Federal government investment on Research and development in 2004 was 0.41% in Mexico versus 0.95% in Brazil and 0.6% in Chile.

=== José Vasconcelos Library ===
The José Vasconcelos Library, labeled by the press as the "Megabiblioteca" ("megalibrary"), was Fox's largest investment in infrastructure. The library is spread on 38,000 square metres (410,000 sq ft) and had an initial planned cost of 954 million pesos (roughly 98 million dollars).

Fox inaugurated the library on May 16, 2006, declaring it one of the most advanced constructions of the 21st century, and that it would be spoken of throughout the world. The inauguration took place a week before the deadline the president had to promote his accomplishments before the 2006 Presidential election.

The library had to be closed in March 2007 because of construction defects. The Superior Auditor of the Federation detected 36 irregularities and issued 13 motions of responsibility for public servants. Among the irregularities was the misplacement of marble blocks. Repairs cost 15 million pesos (roughly 1.4 million dollars).

During the Calderón administration restoration efforts cost another 32 million pesos (roughly 3 million dollars)

== Texcoco and San Salvador Atenco ==
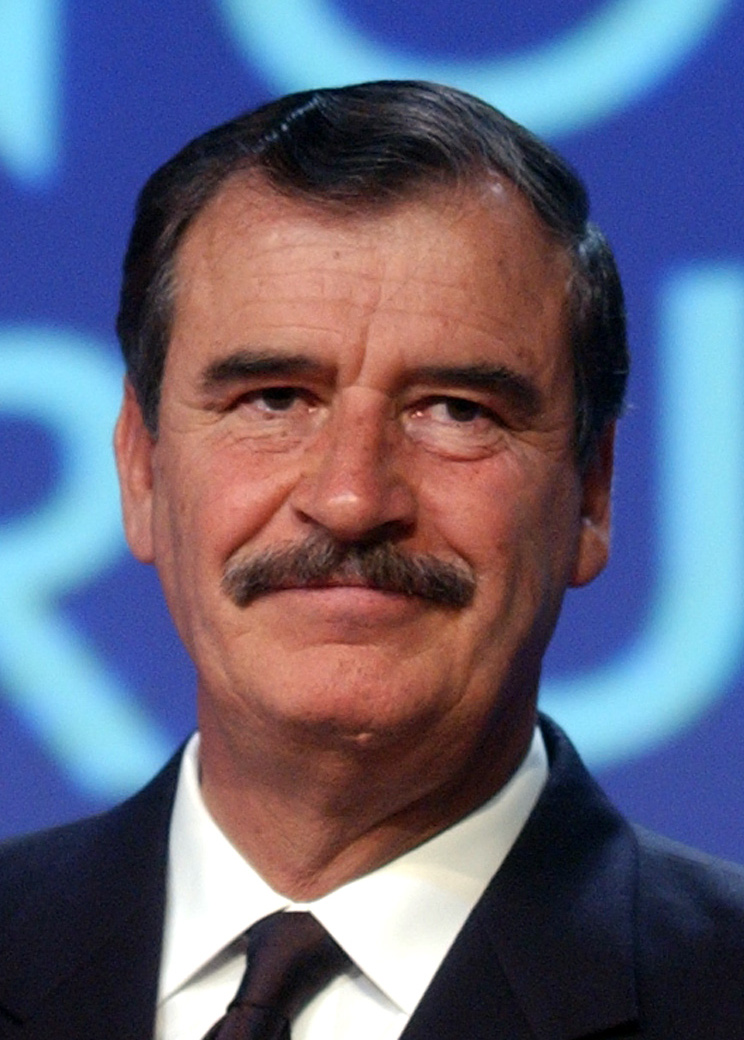
WEF 2003

In 2001, Fox announced the construction of a 2.3 billion dollar international airport in the municipalities of Texcoco and San Salvador Atenco in the State of México to relieve congestion at the overcrowded Mexico City airport, the busiest in Latin America. This new airport would bring thousands of new jobs to an area ravaged by extreme poverty.

The proposed airport plan would relocate 4,375 families and convert 5,000 hectares (12,000 acres) of farmland. Peasants from these areas resisted relocation and formed the Community Front in Defense of Land in 2002. The protests turned violent as protesters took hostages and state forces had to negotiate their release, while Fox announced no change in plans had been considered. After the federal government's failure to negotiate with the farmers, plans for the new airport had to be abandoned. The protesters, many of whom wore black ski masks made famous by rebels in Chiapas became instant heroes to poor farmers nationwide. while journalists, like Sergio Sarmiento called this issue "the biggest failure" of Fox's tenure and declared:

The precedent is terrible. Never before has the government so openly promoted the use of violence to resolve conflicts.

This is in spite of the 1968 Tlatelolco massacre. Jorge Montaño, a former Mexican ambassador to the United States considered Fox was "naive" to think farmers would easily give up their lands and that his government should have taken more time negotiating with the farmers instead of simply sending out engineers to measure runways and calculate flight paths. Montaño also declared that the compensation these farmers were offered were the minimum allowed under the law (3,000 pesos an acre, roughly 275 US dollars) before raising the offer to 21,000 pesos an acre (1,900 US dollars).

After the cancellation, 76% of Mexicans polled thought more unrest would follow the president during his term.

In May 2006, the PRD-led municipal government was attempting to relocate a group of flower vendors from a market of Texcoco. The group refused to leave and asked the assistance of the Community Front in Defense of the Land who confronted the police with machetes. The situation escalated and police officers were held hostage by the protestors. State and federal forces were sent to the site. According to municipal workers the protesters had felt invincible since the airport incident. The confrontation resulted in two deaths and dozens of injuries. On November 9 of the same year, the Attorney General's office admitted to torture and sexual abuse against the protesters.

Fox blamed the Atenco group, led by Ignacio Valle, for the incident and ordered his arrest calling the group an "insult to society". In October 2006, two months before leaving office, Fox declared that the social conflicts of Atenco and Chiapas were solved and that Oaxaca would be solved before his successor took office.

== Institutional image ==
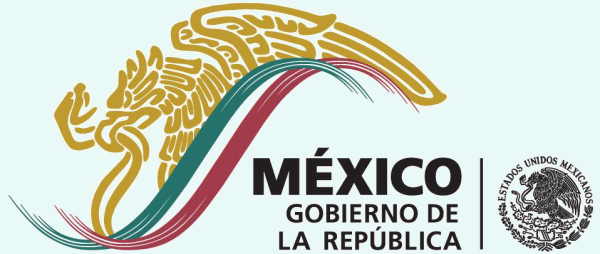
Fox administration Institutional image

President Fox was the first President to have an institutional image that did not display the complete National Coat of Arms, causing controversy. The use of the slashed eagle (águila mocha, in Spanish), as it was called by critics (the word "mocha" having a negative connotation, mocho meaning both chopped and prudish Catholic), was extended to all the dependencies of the Executive Branch substituting the Seal of the United Mexican States (located at the bottom right corner of the Institutional logo) by the acronym of the dependencies. Successor President Felipe Calderón returned to using the complete coat of arms. Apart from criticism to showing only part of the Nation's Coat of Arms, some criticized the inclusion of the color blue to the Administration's institutional image (used in one-color depictions of the logo), as said color is associated to Fox's PAN party, and to a presumptive "F"-like band in the bottom of the image, which, critics suggested, gave more emphasis to Fox's personal image than to the Institution of the President.

== 2006 presidential election ==
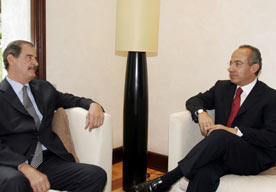
With president Felipe Calderón

Fox openly supported Santiago Creel to become the PAN candidate in 2006. When Felipe Calderón was chosen, Fox endorsed him. On Chapter 14 of Luis Mandoki's Who is Mr. López? documentary titled "Foxilandia" Alfonso Durazo, Fox's former personal secretary, declared that no previous President was ever as active campaigning as Fox. After Calderón's win, López Obrador contested the elections. The Electoral Tribunal of the Judicial Power of the Federation declared the election to be clean but highlighted Fox's influence, declaring that it was the greatest irregularity in the election. Alfonsina Bertha Navarro, minister of the Electoral Tribunal, declared:

Let's remember that he made indirect or metaphoric comments that affected the competing political positions in the election, and even made explicit mentions related to the process; an interference that constitutes the greatest irregularity detected during the development of the process

In August 2006, El Universal polled 600 people in Mexico City, where López Obrador served as Head of Government from 2000 to 2005. 59% believed that the 2006 elections were fraudulent and 63% believed votes should have been recounted. In February 2007, Fox declared about the desafuero process of López Obrador:

I had to retreat and lost. But 18 months later, I got even when my candidate won.

== Approval ratings ==
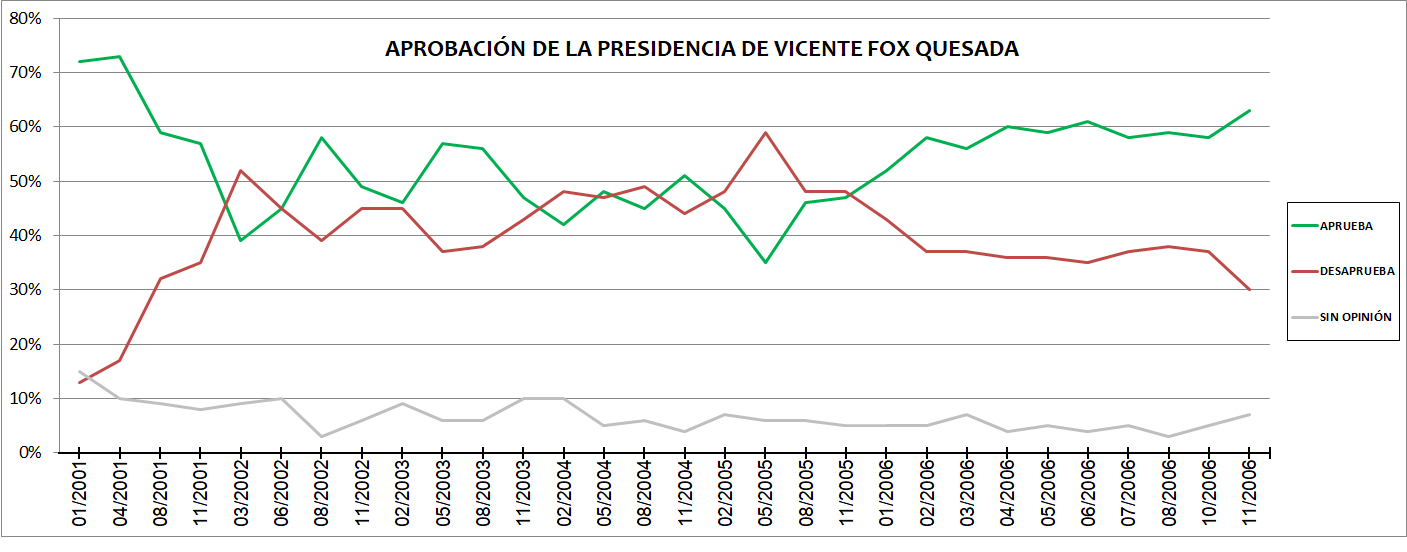
Approval ratings of the Fox administration. Data from GEA-ISA Structura.

When Fox took office on December 1, 2000, his approval rating neared 80%, being the first president in 71 years who wasn't a member of the PRI. During the rest of his presidency, his average approval rating was of 53%, while his average disapproval rating was of 40%.

As seen in the graphic, after taking office the particularly high points of his approval ratings were:

- August 2002 (58% approval, 39% disapproval, 3% unsure), after Fox accepted to suspend the construction of a new airport in the State of Mexico, which had led to months of protests by local residents who resisted their displacement.
- May 2003 (57% approval, 37% disapproval, 6% unsure), after Fox announced that Mexico would not support the US invasion of Iraq.
- Throughout 2006, his approval rating in average was 58% and his average disapproval rating was of 37%, as Fox was on his last year as president and the public focus was on the Presidential elections of that year. The popularity enjoyed by Fox during this period, however, didn't seem to largely benefit the Presidential candidate of his party (PAN) Felipe Calderón, who was controversially declared winner with only 35.9% of the votes, against Andrés Manuel López Obrador of the PRD who officially obtained 35.3% of the votes and claimed that the election had been fraudulent.

While the lowest points of his approval ratings were:

- March 2002 (39% approval, 52% disapproval, 9% unsure), in the wake of the "Comes y te vas" ("Eat and then leave") scandal: during the United Nations International Conference on Financing for Development, which took place between March 18 and 22, 2002 in the city of Monterrey and was hosted by Fox, a diplomatic incident occurred when on the night of the 19th Fox received a letter from Cuban leader Fidel Castro informing him that Castro intended to attend the event on the 21st, as he had been invited by the United Nations. Hours after receiving the letter, Fox made a telephone call to Castro in which he expressed his surprise at Castro's intention to attend the conference and scolded him for not telling him earlier. During the call, Fox suggested to Castro that he and the Cuban delegation arrive on the 21st as scheduled to make their presentation, and finally attend a lunch with the other leaders, after which they would return to Cuba. Fox was apparently worried that US President George W. Bush, who was also scheduled to arrive on the 21st, would be offended by Castro's presence at the conference, which is why Fox suggested Castro to leave after the lunch. Castro was outraged at the proposal, and told Fox that in response, he would make the contents of the call -which he was secretly taping- public, which he indeed did. The media quickly caught onto the incident, dubbing it "Comes y te vas" ("Eat and then leave") after Fox's suggestion towards Castro to leave the conference after the aforementioned lunch. The scandal badly hurt the Fox administration, as it made him seem subservient to the United States and it also broke with the Mexican diplomatic tradition of neutrality towards Cuba.
- February 2004 (42% approval, 48% disapproval, 10% unsure), in the midst of scandals surrounding the First Lady Marta Sahagún, who was accused by an article in the Financial Times of using public funds to run her "Vamos México" foundation. In the same month, Sahagún announced that she intended to become the PAN candidate for the 2006 Presidential elections, an announcement that was deeply unpopular within the party.
- Throughout the rest of 2004 and 2005, Fox's approval rating on average was 45% and his average disapproval rate was of 49%. His generalized descent in popularity during this period is attributed to the highly controversial process of Desafuero against Andrés Manuel López Obrador beginning in May 2004, when the Attorney General of the Republic, supported by the Federal Government, accused López Obrador, then Mayor of Mexico City, of disobeying a federal judge's order regarding an expropriation case, and requested both the removal (desafuero) of López Obrador's constitutional legal immunity and his destitution as Mayor of Mexico City. Due to López Obrador's very high approval ratings in Mexico City and the fact that Fox himself had harshly criticized his administration on previous occasions, López Obrador's supporters protested the desafuero process and accused Fox of trying to prevent López Obrador to participate in the 2006 Presidential elections (given that if he was officially charged, López Obrador would have lost all of his civil rights, including the right to run for the Presidency in 2006, unless he was either quickly acquitted of all charges or managed to serve his sentence before the electoral registration deadline). The process went on for 12 months, and was nearly unanimously criticized by national and foreign media, climaxing in April 2005. On April 7, the Chamber of Deputies voted by 360 to 127 (with two abstentions) to lift López Obrador's constitutional immunity; nonetheless, after a massive rally in support of López Obrador took place in Mexico City on April 24, 2005, with an attendance exceeding one million people (at the time, the biggest political manifestation in recent Mexican history) Fox decided to stop the judicial process against López Obrador.
  - May 2005 registered the lowest approval rating for Fox (35% approval, 59% disapproval, 6% unsure) in the aftermath of both the chaotic Desafuero process and the controversial comments made by Fox regarding African Americans that same month.

== See also ==
- Vicente Fox
- List of presidents of Mexico
- National Action Party (Mexico)
- 2000 Mexican general election
- 2006 Mexican general election
- Foxilandia
