= Jesús Javier Castillo Cabrera =

General Jesús Javier Castillo Cabrera was a Chief of the Presidential Guard from 2006 to 2012. He was chosen by President of Mexico Felipe Calderón at the beginning of his term.

General Castillo is an official in the Mexican Army. He has a master's degree from the Instituto Nacional de Administración Pública, and education on Leadership and Chief State from Mexico's Escuela Superior de Guerra (War College). He was assistant to the Undersecretary of Defense in 1980, administrative coordinator of the Estado Mayor Presidencial (EMP) in 1988, and Chief of the Second Section of the EMP in 1994. In 1997 he was Chief of the Presidential Guard department, and in 2000 he was named Administrative Vice-Chief. In 2006 he was made two star General, and shortly after he was named by the President to lead the EMP.

== See also ==
- Mexican Executive Cabinet
