= Estrada Doctrine =

Mexican foreign policy doctrine

The Estrada Doctrine (also known as La Doctrina Mexico, La Doctrina Mexicana and La Doctrina Ortiz Rubio) is Mexico's core foreign policy guideline since 1930; according to it, states should not formally announce the diplomatic recognition of foreign governments, as that could be perceived as a judgment on the legitimacy of said government, and such an action would imply a breach of state sovereignty. The policy is based on the principles of non-intervention, peaceful resolution of disputes and self-determination of all nations. In line with the Estrada doctrine, Mexico to this day – and in contrast with many other states – does not issue declarations of which government of a foreign country it recognizes as legitimate (for example amid a coup or revolution).

The doctrine’s name derives from Genaro Estrada, Secretary of Foreign Affairs during the presidency of Pascual Ortiz Rubio (1930–1932).

== Background ==
On September 12, 1931, Mexico was admitted to the League of Nations. That was a significant event as it had not been invited since the creation of the intergovernmental organization once the First World War ended, which can be attributed mainly to some unsolved problems between Mexico and the United States. In the heart of the forum, Mexico established its position in favor of the international law and the principles of non-intervention and self-determination. The Mexican government always supported the peaceful resolution of disputes and rejected the use of force in international relations. All of that gave the country a major international prestige. As for its southern neighbors in Latin America and the Caribbean, Mexico returned to the International Conference of American States, where it had been previously excluded because the government had not been recognized by the US. The country gained an outstanding prestige in the conferences that took place in Havana (1928) and Montevideo (1933), which postured for Latin American union and international law.

Meanwhile, Mexico had the opportunity to spread its position towards the international practice of recognition, known as the Estrada Doctrine. Secretary of Foreign Affairs, Genaro Estrada, pointed out on September 27, 1930:

The government of Mexico restricts itself to keep or retire, when considered appropriate, its diplomatic agents and to continue accepting, when considered appropriate as well, similar diplomatic agents whose respective nations have accredited in Mexico, without qualifying, neither hastily nor a posteriori, the right that nations have to accept, keep or replace their governments or authorities.

== Content ==
The Estrada Doctrine suggests that upon the establishment of de facto governments in other countries, Mexico did not support giving recognition because it is considered a degrading practice. By injuring the sovereignty of other states, recognition puts them in a vulnerable position because their internal affairs can be judged by other governments, which assume a critical attitude when deciding about the legality and legitimacy of foreign governments. Mexico was itself harmed because of the practice, as it was difficult to obtain recognition of its independence.

The most extended use of the Estrada Doctrine was in the 1970s, when Mexico did not withdraw its recognition of any South American government that was formed through a coup d'état. The only measure Mexico could use against such governments was withdrawing its diplomatic mission.

In other words, the Estrada Doctrine states that Mexico should not make positive or negative judgements about the governments, or changes in government, of other nations, because such an action would imply a breach to their sovereignty. In addition, the doctrine is based on the universally-recognized principles of self-determination and non-intervention, which are considered essential for mutual respect and cooperation amongst nations.

== Current status ==
During the Vicente Fox administration (2000–2006), both Ministers of Foreign Affairs, Jorge Castañeda Gutman and Luis Ernesto Derbez, tried to discontinue the Estrada Doctrine, resulting in what was called the Castañeda Doctrine. Under President Andrés Manuel López Obrador, Mexico began to utilize the Estrada Doctrine once more, especially during the 2019 Venezuelan presidential crisis.

In the midst of the 2026 United States intervention in Venezuela, Mexico reiterated its stance in line with the Estrada Doctrine to remain distant from the conflict.

== Criticism ==
Most of the critics of the doctrine were directed toward whether it was morally and politically valid or not that the Mexican government stayed "neutral" in the presence of governments categorized as dictatorships.

Jorge Castañeda Gutman, who would later serve a two-year term as the Secretary of Foreign Affairs during the Vicente Fox administration, criticized Mexico's foreign policy in 1987:

In the Mexican foreign policy, it has been continuously claimed the defense of our principles and international law. In accordance to this, then we do not have any interest, we have principles instead, which can be qualified as a diplomatic hypocrisy. In the long term, this unfortunate implementation of the principles undermines any internal support for every real foreign policy (with costs, consequences and benefits) and confers the country an arrogant halo in the international scene.

== See also ==
- Foreign relations of Mexico
- Castañeda Doctrine

== Sources ==
- Pereña-García, Mercedes (2001). Las Relaciones Diplomáticas de México. Plaza y Valdés, p. 94. ISBN 968-856-917-8.
- Velázquez Flores, Rafael (2007). Factores, Bases y Fundamentos de la Política Exterior de México. Plaza y Valdés, p. 331. ISBN 970-722-473-8.
- Secretariat of Foreign Affairs (2005) La Política Exterior Mexicana en la Transición. FCE, SRE, p. 281. ISBN 968-16-7745-5.
