= Genaro Estrada =

Mexican politician and academic (1887–1937)

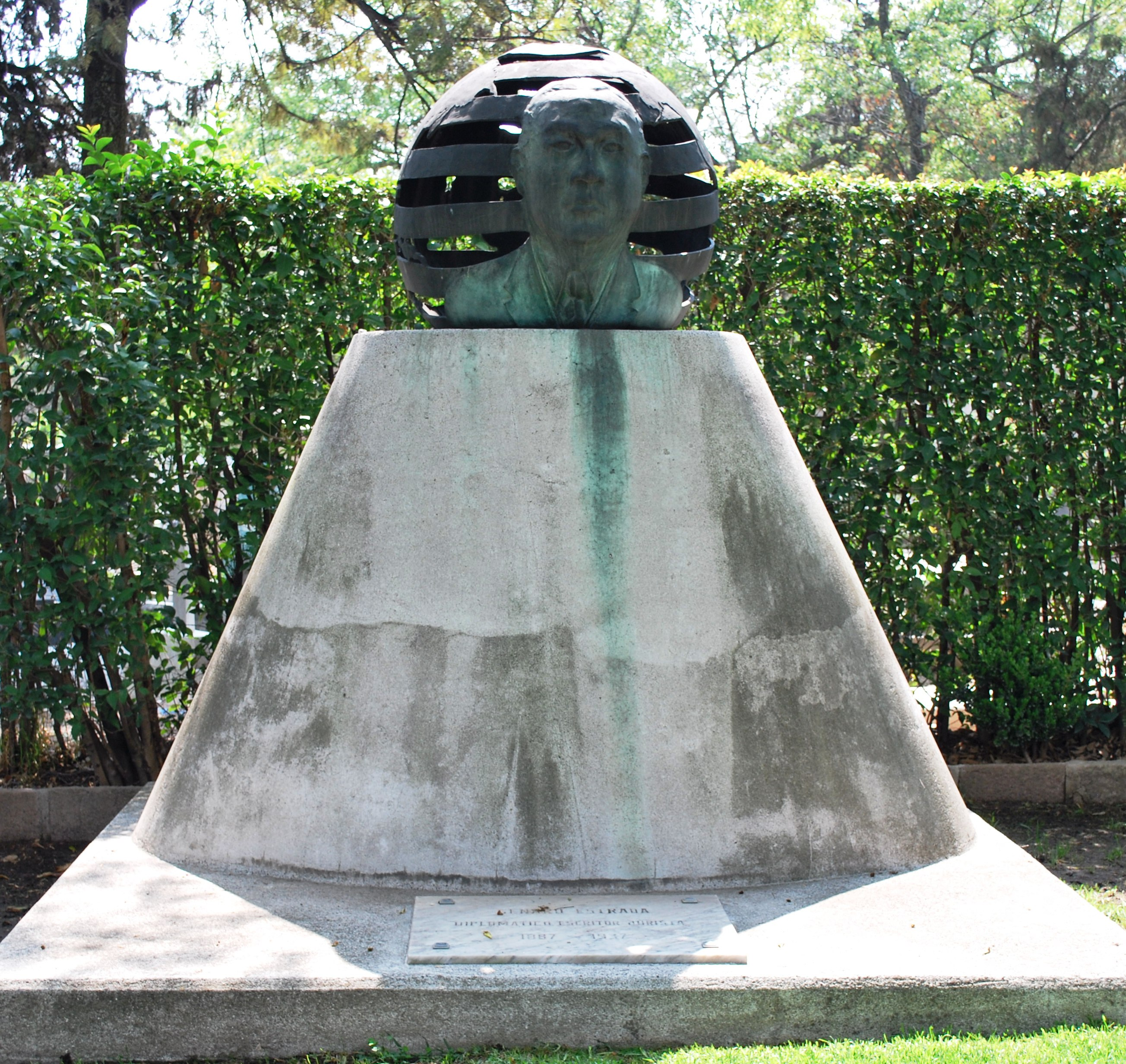
Genaro Estrada

Genaro Estrada (June 2, 1887 – September 29, 1937) was a Mexican statesman, academic, and writer. He was Secretary of Foreign Affairs of Mexico between 1930 and 1932 and the architect of the Estrada Doctrine, which stated that the Mexican government would acknowledge any foreign government, no matter how it came into power. This doctrine would influence Mexican politics all throughout the 20th century.

== Biography ==
Estrada was born in Mazatlán, Sinaloa. He served as a journalist in Mazatlán early in life and moved to Mexico City in 1912, where he was professor at the Escuela Nacional Preparatoria and entered the capital's cultural and political life. He became involved in government after the Mexican Revolution. By the end of the 1920s he served as ambassador to Spain and minister to Portugal and Turkey. He later became professor at the National Autonomous University of Mexico, where he founded the Academia Mexicana de la Historia. He also published a novel, Pero Galín (1926), and four books of satirical and political poetry. He died in Mexico City in 1937.

== See also ==
- Estrada Doctrine
