= Jefatura del Estado Mayor Presidencial =

The Jefatura del Estado Mayor Presidencial was the office served by the General commanding the Estado Mayor Presidencial (EMP), a kind of Presidential Guard that protected the security of the President of Mexico, his family, and that of foreign dignitaries visiting Mexico. The last Jefe was General Roberto Francisco Miranda Moreno.

The Jefe also served as the President's Chief of Staff, coordinating advisors, and taking charge of other logistical operations. However, it was most noted for leading elite members of the Mexican Army in guaranteeing the President's security. Members of the EMP were assigned early in the election to the candidates to protect them. When a candidate won, they usually picked his chief of candidate security as their Jefe.

== List of Jefes ==
- Gral. Div. Pascual Cornejo Bruno (1952–1958)
- Gral. Div. José Gómez Huerta (1958–1964)
- Gral. Div. Luis Gutiérrez Oropeza (1964–1970)
- Gral. Div. Jesús Castañeda Gutiérrez (1970–1976)
- Gral. Div. Miguel Ángel Godinez Bravo (1976–1982)
- Gral. Div. Carlos Humberto Bermúdez Dávila (1982–1988)
- Gral. Div. Arturo Cardona Marino (1988–1994)
- Gral. Div. Roberto Miranda Sánchez (1994–2000)
- Gral. Div. José Armando Tamayo Casillas. (2000–2006)
- Gral. Div. Jesús Javier Castillo Cabrera (2006–2012)
- Gral. Div. Roberto Miranda Moreno (2012–December 2018)
