= Desafuero of Andrés Manuel López Obrador =

Political controversy in 2000s Mexico

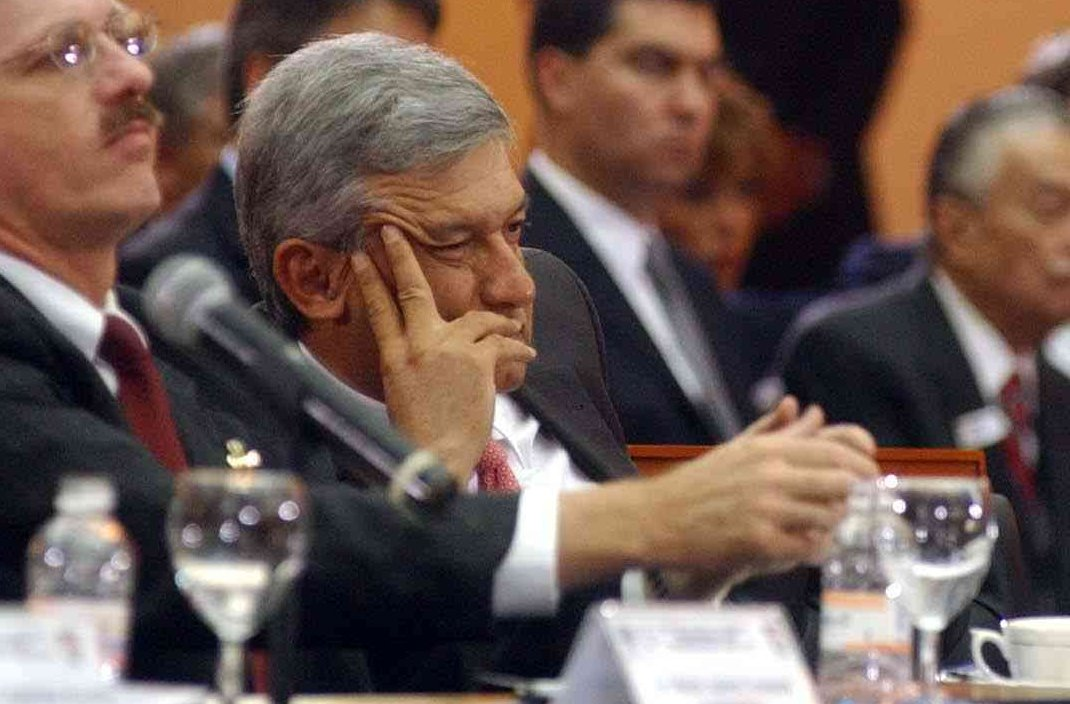
Andrés Manuel López Obrador in 2004.

The Desafuero of Andrés Manuel López Obrador was the removal of López Obrador's state immunity from prosecution, in his role as Mayor of Mexico City. The legal and political process took place during 2004 and 2005, and it was originated by a land owner who sued the government of the Federal District (Note: At the time, this was the legal name of Mexico City.) on the grounds of improper expropriation of a patch of land called El Encino. This case became a serious issue for López Obrador in 2005, when a vote by the Chamber of Deputies lifted his constitutional immunity against criminal charges. If officially charged, he would have lost all his civil rights, including the right to run for the presidency in 2006, unless he was either quickly acquitted of all charges or managed to serve his sentence before the electoral registration deadline.

The desafuero was supported by the then-ruling PAN, the federal government headed by then-President Vicente Fox, and the PRI; it was opposed by the PRD (the party in which López Obrador was affiliated) and left-wing politicians. The process lasted for more than a year and resulted in a polarization among Mexican society between those who supported the desafuero and those who opposed it.

After a massive rally in support of López Obrador took place in Mexico City on April 24, 2005, with an attendance exceeding one million people (at the time, the biggest political demonstration in recent Mexican history), and near unanimous condemnation from the foreign media towards the process, President Fox decided to stop the judicial process against López Obrador.

On April 27, 2005, Fox announced changes in his cabinet, a re-evaluation of the legal case against AMLO and legal changes so civil rights are only suspended once a citizen is found guilty. Fox and López Obrador met in the first week of May 2005, as part of the efforts to calm the political climate. The new Attorney General found a way to avoid prosecuting López Obrador, but it depended on the approval of the private company that first sued him.

== Legal background ==
The 111th article of the Mexican Constitution states that most high-level elected officials cannot be prosecuted for criminal offenses while in office without a simple majority vote of the Chamber of Deputies stating there are grounds for prosecution. This privilege is usually confused with the freedom of speech protection granted to members of congress by the 61st article, known as fuero (from Latin forum), the process to strip it is known as desafuero. Since immunity from criminal prosecution is almost universally confused with the fuero, both terms will be used interchangeably.

If the Chamber of Deputies votes in the negative, the prosecution can still take place when the official leaves his post, as deputies don't vote on the accusation itself but only on whether there is a reasonable belief that a crime was committed. If it votes in favor, the official can be prosecuted. A secondary law states in this case the official loses his office immediately.

The constitution mandates that state governors are subject to their state congresses; the Federal District is not a state.

An individual facing criminal prosecution has his political rights suspended (38th article) so he cannot run for office or hold one, at least temporarily. All candidates for the presidential election in July 2006 were required to register no later than January 15, 2006, although the law does allow a change of candidate until May of the same year.

The legal system is mostly untested in cases like this, and the special status of the Federal District (it is not a state; until 1997 it was governed by a departmental head appointed by the president; it has a legislative assembly that is not a state congress) will lead to appeals and legal controversies before the Supreme Court.

== El Encino case ==
López Obrador ran exactly that risk. On November 9, 2000, Rosario Robles, his predecessor, expropriated a patch of land from a larger property called "El Encino", in Santa Fe, Cuajimalpa, to build an access road for a private hospital. The owner sued the government on March 11, 2001, and was granted a federal judicial order barring further construction until the matter was definitively settled, as it prevented the owner access to his own property. By August, the judge found the works continued, so he requested the federal attorney general to make an inquiry and take the necessary steps to bring him into compliance. The federal attorney general had no option but to proceed. Several months passed, partly because until recent times the courts usually sided with the government in expropriation cases and therefore the case covers unknown ground, and partly because it was such an extraordinary step. By May 17, 2004, the attorney general could not keep procrastinating (otherwise he would be prosecuted) and announced he would request the removal of AMLO's immunity, which he did two days later. Many months of mutual accusations later, it became clear 2005 would be a pivotal year for the case.

He would be formally prosecuted in a matter of days after losing his immunity; in that case he would have had to be cleared of all charges before January 15, 2006, if he wished to run for the presidency (although the law allows candidate changes until May). López Obrador stated several times he would forgo all legal means available to him to remain free until a verdict is given, going to prison when the prosecution starts and campaigning from there. He also stated he would be his own lawyer at his criminal trial (his studies are in political science and public administration) although he would receive legal advice from two different lawyers. His party changed its statutes to allow him to become a candidate while jailed.

As part of his campaign before the Chamber of Deputies' vote, he organized mass rallies in public places to pressure the vote in his favor and doing media interviews comparing his process with those held against Mexican revolutionary Francisco I. Madero or U.S. civil rights activist Martin Luther King Jr., insisting it was a conspiracy masterminded by former President Salinas and President Fox.

A fact that was lost despite having appeared earlier in official documents was that, apparently, López Obrador refused to follow the judicial order barring further construction of accesses to the ABC Hospital because he was sued by them and would have to pay USD 37 million if the accesses weren't finished before the deadline. Apparently, his government sold land to construct the hospital but for some reason, in agreement with the hospital, such land was exchanged for another. The new land had no accesses, making it useless; the hospital sued AMLO's government. It is unknown at this moment if AMLO's government committed a financial offense in regard to this.

== The Chamber of Deputies vote ==
Despite his vigorous defense, the process could not be stopped and López Obrador lost the first battle in a restricted vote by a commission of four deputies on April 1, 2005, opening the door for the full Chamber of Deputies to vote six days later to remove his immunity after hearing both his and the prosecution's arguments. This restricted vote by the commission, originally scheduled two days earlier, decided there was a reasonable belief a crime was committed by three votes to one. Media coverage of the preliminary vote was small, because of the impending demise of Pope John Paul II (he died the next day). This prompted López Obrador to express (hours before the Pope died) his concerns about what he saw as minimal coverage of his desafuero process, but "hours and hours" of special coverage on the Pope's health condition. "(The media only said that) López Obrador lost three to one, as if it were a soccer match", he said, expressing his fears of a return to a time when the media, especially television, were subordinated to the government.

On April 7, 2005, López Obrador went to the Chamber of Deputies to present his case. Attendance, when the session began, was reported to be 488 out of 500 deputies, but apparently one of the deputies arrived too late to vote. After a long session where AMLO accused President Fox of being behind the process, the Chamber of Deputies voted by 360 to 127 (with two abstentions) to lift AMLO's constitutional immunity against prosecution. A secondary law states that in cases like this, he is immediately dismissed from his office. The local assembly of representatives (the Federal District had no Congress as its status was somewhere between a state and a county), with a majority of PRD members (AMLO's party) refused to acknowledge the validity of this process. This was relevant to the city's future, as they were the ones legally entitled to name AMLO's successor.

== Political context ==
The desafuero is both a legal and a political process (it is the Chamber of Deputies, an eminently political body, that decides the outcome) and as such, political considerations played at least as great a role as legal considerations in deciding López Obrador's fate. There were political reactions both against and in favour of the process from early 2004, climaxing in April 2005 when López Obrador saw his constitutional immunity lifted.

=== General political context ===
The desafuero process started and gathered momentum during the second half of the Vicente Fox presidency, characterised by a growing sense of power vacuum as Fox was increasingly perceived by Mexican society and political actors as a "lame duck" incapable of pushing the ambitious reform agenda that swept him into power in 2000. The Fox presidency was also besieged by cabinet defections and the growing popularity of López Obrador, who was running significantly ahead of all other likely candidates in all presidential election polls and seemed to be immune to political scandals involving his inner circle.

=== Political and social reactions in favor of the desafuero ===
The political case for the desafuero was championed mainly by the federal government, the governing Partido Acción Nacional (PAN) and the Partido Revolucionario Institucional (PRI). On its face, their main argument was the full enforcement of the law. This argument resonated with many sectors of society long accustomed to suffer the selective enforcement of the law according to political or economic considerations. To others, however, this argument rang hollow in view of the lack of prosecution of several multimillion-dollar financial scandals involving prominent members of the PRI and, to a lesser extent, the PAN.

Towards the end of the desafuero process, amid increasing perception of its politicization, this argument became less tenable, with support for the desafuero ultimately coming almost exclusively from militants of the PRI and PAN.

=== Political actors and reactions against the desafuero ===
Predictably, arguments against the desafuero came, at least at the start, from López Obrador's Partido de la Revolución Democrática (PRD) and other members and militants of the Mexican political left. By early 2005 AMLO promoted different forms of protest against the desafuero: posters declaring "No al desafuero" or similar slogans, seen mostly in March, making a census of political and grassroots movements willing to show their support for López Obrador, different political acts by his party, the PRD.

López Obrador's media strategy was to contrast his prosecution with that of killings attributed to previous governments (1968, 1971) and financial scandals (1994-1995) where almost no convictions were made (but heavy fines applied in some of the latter), and emphasizing his status as the leader in the polls. He also compared himself with Francisco I. Madero, a political candidate in 1910 who was imprisoned by dictator Porfirio Díaz and eventually became leader of the Mexican Revolution and the next president. He also has compared himself with international civil rights activists who suffered prison at some moment of their life. He also claims his process to be a political plot orchestrated by, among other top politicians, former president Carlos Salinas de Gortari, former President Fox, and PAN presidential pre-candidate Santiago Creel. As the desafuero process gained momentum, more independent voices began to express their opposition to it. This included noted Mexican intellectuals, much of the national media, some members of the PRI and the PAN and ultimately, a unanimous chorus from the foreign media. This was the main factor that ultimately forced the PAN and the government to reverse their course on this matter and to look for a political solution. This outcome was widely hailed as a positive for Mexican society and democracy, but it clearly took a heavy toll on the government's credibility. Many also argue that the Rule of Law principle that the PAN and the government had so vehemently defended during the process was suddenly no longer a priority when it became clear that the politics of the desafuero were only damaging the PAN's prospects and were arguably boosting López Obrador's political image.

== Chronology ==
- 9 November 2000: Rosario Robles, his predecessor, expropriated a plot of land from a larger property called El Encino, in Santa Fe, Cuajimalpa, to build an access road for a private hospital.
- 11 March 2001: The landowner sued the Federal District on the grounds of improper expropriation. He was granted a federal judicial order barring further construction until the matter was definitively settled. Construction, the proprietor alleged, prevented access to his property. According to prosecutors, López Obrador knowingly disregarded this order several times. Under the criminal code, this is a misdemeanor.
- January 2005: López Obrador's intention to run for president became clear. Meanwhile, the Attorney General resurrects the case and sends it to Congress for evaluation.
- Late February and March 2005: As the desafuero vote in a congressional sub-committee approached, the federal government initiated a media campaign against López Obrador. Fox had his Secretary of the Interior, Santiago Creel, run a series of media spots which attempted to draw comparisons between López Obrador and common criminals. Despite the media campaign, the overwhelming majority of the population believed that the desafuero process was politically motivated.
- 1 April 2005: López Obrador lost the first battle in a vote taken by a sub-committee of four deputies, enabling a desafuero vote by the full Chamber of Deputies six days later.
- 7 April 2005: López Obrador defended himself in an address to the deputies. After a long session in which he accused President Fox of being behind the process, the Chamber of Deputies voted to remove the fuero 360 to 127. The final tally amounted to a party-line vote, with the PRI and the PAN voting to remove his fuero. The PRD, López Obrador's party, voted unanimously against the resolution. López Obrador saw his constitutional immunities lifted. The loss of his constitutional immunity appeared to be the beginning of a protracted legal and political struggle that would expose certain shortcomings in the Mexican legal system. After the deputies' vote, the Asamblea Legislativa del Distrito Federal (the local legislative body) precipitated a constitutional crisis, claiming it was that body which should have voted on the desafuero; the federal deputies' filed their own complaint, arguing that Congress was the appropriate body to consider the desafuero. The Supreme Court agreed to consider both appeals, thereby allowing López Obrador to remain Head of Government, while simultaneously being subject to prosecution. Editorials in The New York Times, the Los Angeles Times, the Chicago Tribune, and the Financial Times all considered the desafuero a bad decision.
- 8 April 2005: López Obrador left office. The local government was temporarily headed by López Obrador's Secretary of Government Alejandro Encinas.
- Two local deputies from the PAN, Jorge Lara and Gabriela Cuevas, the ruling party, paid the bail so López Obrador would not be incarcerated. López Obrador called the bail a "cowardly act" and refused to accept it as it came from the hands of those that promoted the desafuero. A judge later rejected the charges and the bail on technical grounds.
- 24 April 2005: A rally in support of López Obrador takes place at the Zócalo in Mexico City. Mexico City sources cited an attendance exceeding one million people. Federal government sources calculated an attendance in the "hundreds of thousands". López Obrador had promoted different forms of protest against the desafuero as early as the case against him started. His critics charged that this promotion was paid for with government funds. This included the production of posters featuring phrases such as "No al desafuero" or "No al Golpe de Estado". He also coordinated political and grassroots movements in Mexico and abroad. His supporters countered that the promotion was spontaneous, and completely independent of the local government.
- 27 April 2005: President Fox announced changes in his cabinet (including the resignation of Attorney General Rafael Macedo de la Concha) and a re-evaluation of the legal case against López Obrador, and he proposed a constitutional amendment so civil rights are not suspended until a citizen is found guilty. As of February 2006, these changes have not passed Congress. A new attorney general was appointed.
- 4 May 2005: The new Attorney General's office announced they would drop contempt charges against López Obrador on a technicality. In summary, it declared, he was guilty but his unique post as "Head of Government", of recent creation, had not been incorporated in all the laws. The law only had provisions for governors or municipal president. López Obrador was neither. Hence, the wording of the relevant article made it unclear if a penalty for his crime exists. The announcement was refuted by criminal law experts. On the one hand, they contended, because there is a clear penalty due legal precedents. On the other hand, they claimed, the Attorney General cannot declare guilt nor innocence, even less interpret the law. Thereby, the Attorney General could not drop charges due to the nature of the offense and because charges were filed by a private company. The company followed the suit.
- December 2005: Chief Justice Mariano Azuela Güitrón further criticized the case dismissal. He said that neither the President nor Congress can declare innocence nor close the matter for political reasons, as he claimed Fox did. (According to published reports, Chief Justice Mariano Azuela had discussed the desafuero of López Obrador with President Fox as early as late 2004, well before Congress took action, a highly irregular act.)
- January 2006: Marisela Morales, the Attorney General's official directly in charge of the case since the beginning, left her post at the unit responsible for prosecuting crimes committed by government officials. With her departure, all high-level officials in charge of the case have been replaced, but the Attorney General's office did state, shortly after Azuela's speech in late December, that charges against López Obrador are still pending.

== The aftermath ==
The loss of his constitutional immunity appeared to be only the beginning of a long legal and political struggle. Aside from the political power at risk, the untested legal system has shown deficiencies which would further prolong controversies.

After the deputies' vote, the Asamblea Legislativa del Distrito Federal rose a constitutional controversy against them claiming it was they who should have voted since they are similar to a state Congress (the Federal District is not a state). The federal deputies' filed their own complaint, and both were accepted by the Supreme Court. Both were in effect simultaneously, so AMLO was and was not the Head of Government.

When a judge knew about the charges, two local deputies of the PAN ruling party paid a guarantee to keep AMLO away from jail. The judge rejected later both the charges and the guarantee on technical grounds. AMLO called the guarantee a "cowardly act", as he wanted to be imprisoned.

On April 24, 2005, a march called by AMLO was attended by an official estimate of 1.2 million people (as estimated by the Federal District government's Secretary of Public Security). This figure includes union and government workers. The march culminated on the Zócalo, in the center of the city, participants either expressing their solidarity towards López Obrador or their disapproval of the desafuero process. This was probably the most widely attended political event in recent times, and comparable to the apolitical march against crime held two years before.

On April 27, President Fox announced changes to his cabinet, a reevaluation of the legal case against AMLO and legal changes so civil rights are only suspended until a citizen is found guilty. In his eight-minute speech to the nation, he called AMLO "Head of Government", forgetting controversies about whether he was sacked from office or not, and placed great emphasis on the importance of having suspicion-free elections in 2006. This was an important victory for AMLO, but it was still too early to say the case was closed.

On May 4, the Attorney General's office announced they would drop contempt charges against AMLO on a technicality: they declared he was guilty, but his unique post as Head of Government (neither governor nor mayor) made it unclear a penalty for his crime existed due to the wording of the relevant article. This announcement was refuted by criminal law experts, since the Attorney General cannot declare guilt or innocence, even less interpret the law; they cannot drop charges due to the nature of the offense, and because charges were pressed by a private company, which stated it will follow the suit. Even if López Obrador couldn't be punished for a technicality (a controversial issue in itself), he could still be found guilty and subject to other penalties. Even more, under the then current law, López Obrador would be prevented from running for office for as long as he was subject to process, and since the moment he resigned to run for the presidency, he was a common citizen which could be subject to process at any moment, then losing his political rights. However, it was unlikely this would happen, for political reasons, despite the efforts of his opponents and the private owner suing him.
