= Estado Mayor Presidencial =

- Common name: Estado Mayor
- Abbreviation: EMP

Agency overview
- Formed: 1926
- Dissolved: 2018
- Annual budget: 409,750,109 MXN

Jurisdictional structure
- Federal agency: MEX
- Operations jurisdiction: MEX
- Governing body: Jefatura del Estado Mayor Presidencial
- General nature: Federal law enforcement

Operational structure
- Sworn members: 4,400
- Agency executive: General Roberto Miranda Moreno, Jefe del Estado Mayor Presidencial
- Parent agency: Secretary of National Defense (Mexico)
- Field offices: 136

Website
- www.gob.mx/presidencia/acciones-y-programas/estado-mayor-presidencial-14579

The Estado Mayor Presidencial — EMP (English: Presidential General Staff) was the institution charged with protecting and safeguarding the President of Mexico, the First Lady of Mexico and their immediate families. It is described in its regulations as a military technical body and an administrative unit (Military staff) of the Presidency of the Republic of Mexico in facilitating the President's fulfillment of his attributes and functions.

The EMP was part of the Mexican Army, and a General always led it, embodied in the Jefatura del Estado Mayor Presidencial. Its last Jefatura was led by General Roberto Francisco Miranda Moreno, whom President Enrique Peña Nieto appointed.

== History ==
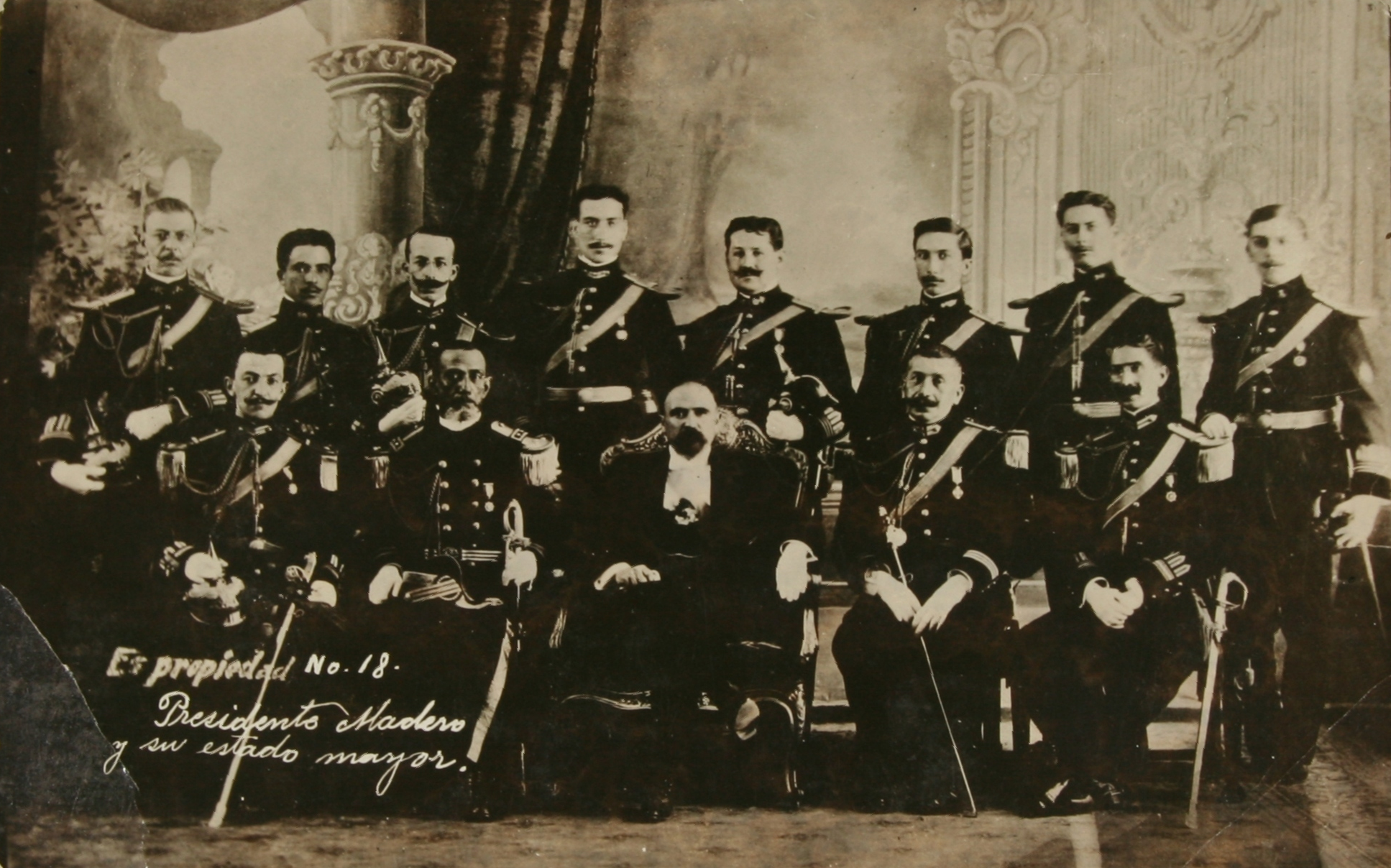
President Francisco I. Madero and his Presidential Guard, Mexico National Palace, 1911

During the administration of Francisco I. Madero, the Presidential General Staff operated based on the General Ordinance of the Army, which was issued on December 11, 1911. On June 26, 1916, Venustiano Carranza issued a decree to reorganize the General Staffs of the Constitutionalist Army, thus reinstating the name Presidential General Staff, which had been modified during the coup and authoritarian government of Victoriano Huerta. On March 15, 1926, during the presidency of General Plutarco Elías Calles, the Organic Law of the National Army and Navy was decreed, which established in its Article 33 the basis for the creation of the Presidential Aide-de-Camp, which continued to operate during the administration of Lázaro Cárdenas.

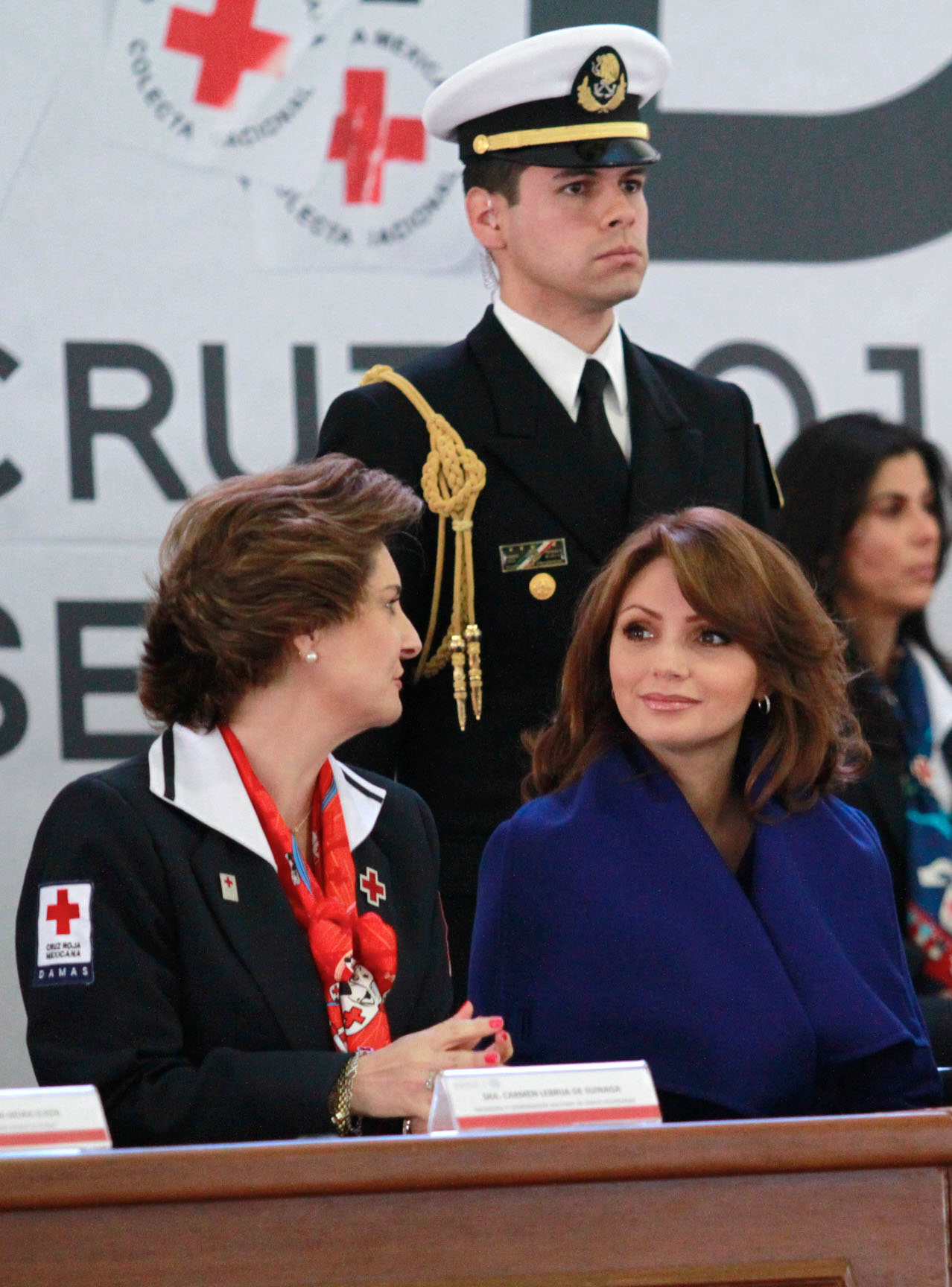
EMP personnel accompanies First Lady Angélica Rivera to the start of the 2013 Mexican Red Cross national donation drive

During the presidency of Manuel Ávila Camacho, on January 12, 1942, the Organic Law of the National Army and Navy of 1926 was amended, transforming the Presidential Aide's Office into the Presidential General Staff (EMP). On April 15, 1942, to address the situation imposed by World War II, the EMP Regulations were issued, assigning the organization the function of assisting the President of the Republic in the military, economic, legal, and moral preparation and organization of the country for war. At the end of the armed conflict in 1945, the organization resumed its original functions of providing security and logistical support to the President of the Republic.

On March 24, 1985, President Miguel de la Madrid amended the regulations of the Presidential Guard (EMP). On January 16, 2004, during the presidency of Vicente Fox, the new regulations for the Presidential Guard (EMP) were issued and published in the Official Gazette of the Federation on January 23 of the same year. These regulations updated the structure, organization, and operation of the EMP as a technical military body and as an administrative unit of the Office of the President to facilitate the fulfillment of its responsibilities.

=== Disbanding ===
It was disbanded on December 1, 2018 by President Andrés Manuel López Obrador by amending the Organization Act on the Mexican Army and Air Force with 108 votes in favor, none against, and 12 abstentions in the Mexican Senate. Ex-EMP personnel would be assigned to their original units in the Mexican military with ranks and benefits.

== Organization ==
According to Article 5 of the Presidential General Staff Regulations, for the fulfillment of its general missions, the EMP will be organized as follows:

- Leadership;
- Private Secretary;
- Deputy Chief of Security;
- Deputy Head of Logistics;
- Administrative Sub-Directorate;
- Comptroller's Office and General Assistant's Office;
- Section One and Detail (Human Resources);
- Second Section (Intelligence and Counterintelligence);
- Section Three (Organization and Protocol);
- Fourth Section (Logistics);
- Section Five (Security);
- Sixth Section (Events of the Wife of the President of the Republic);
- Seventh Section (Protection of Persons);
- Eighth Section (Personal Protection of the President of the Republic);
- Section Nine (Facility Security);
- Transmissions Section;
- Office of the President of the Republic;
- General Coordination of Presidential Air Transport;
- Administrative Coordination;
- Maintenance Coordination;
- Sports Promotion Coordination;
- Social Promotion Coordination;
- Legal Affairs Unit;
- Information Technology Unit;
- Security and Trust Unit;
- Hospital Center, and
- Training and Development Center.

=== Training ===
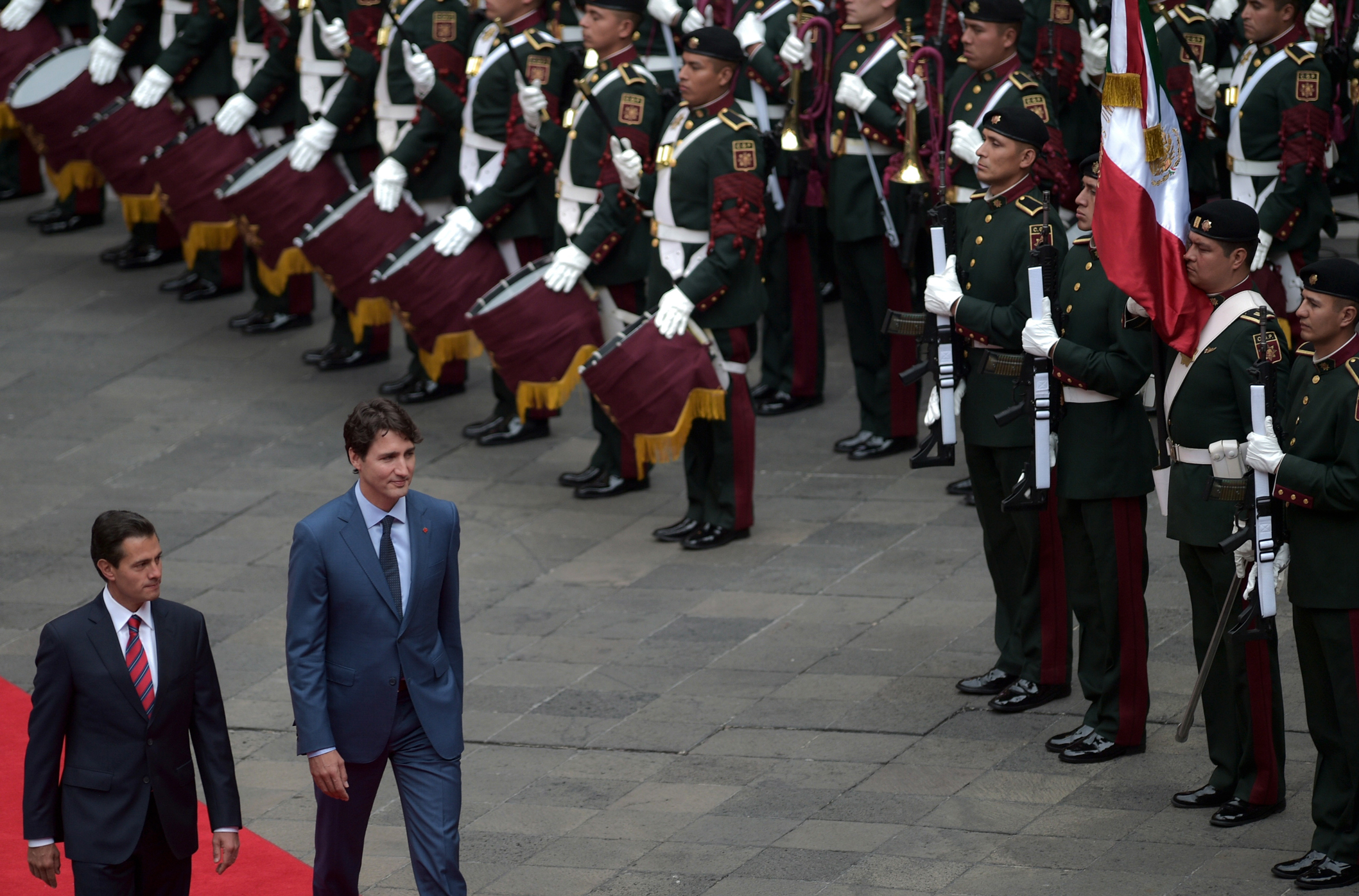
Mexican EMP honour guards during Justin Trudeau's state visit to Mexico.

Presidential Guard included a reaction group, (grupo de reacción inmediata y potente, GRIP), whose members were trained in martial arts such as karate, aikijutsu, tae kwon do, kick boxing, kung fu, judo, and silat; furthermore, they were trained in techniques and tactics in order to protect high-ranking officials and civil servants, such as the President.

=== Order of Battle ===
- Presidential Guard Corps Headquarters
  - 1st Presidential Guard Battalion
  - 2nd Presidential Guard Battalion
  - 3rd Presidential Guard Battalion
  - 4th Presidential Guard Battalion
  - 5th Presidential Guard Battalion
  - 6th Presidential Guard Battalion
  - 1st Supply Company
  - 1st Transport Battalion
- 24th Presidential Guard Marine Infantry Battalion (from the Naval Infantry Force)
- 1st Mounted Cavalry Group
  - Honor Cavalry Squadron
  - Hippomobile Battery
- 1st Combat Engineer Company
- Honor Artillery Battery
- War Band (Banda de Guerra)
- Presidential Air Transport Group
