= Roberto Miranda Moreno =

Mexican General officer (born 1955)

Roberto Francisco Miranda Moreno
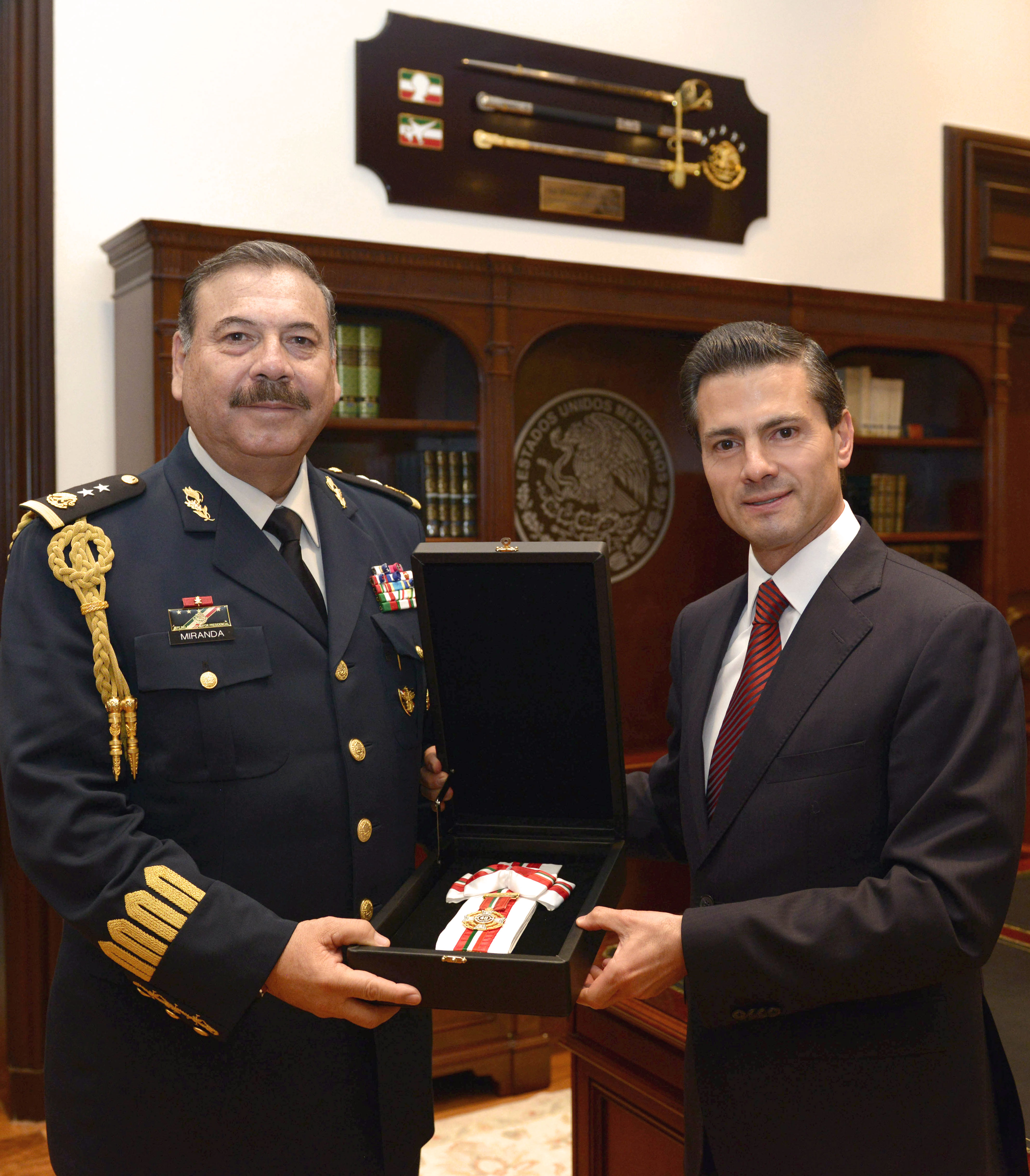
- Miranda Moreno with President Enrique Peña Nieto in 2015
- Born: 1955 (age 70–71); Morelos, Mexico
- Military career
- Allegiance: Mexico
- Branch: Mexican Army
- Rank: General officer
- Commands: Chief of the Estado Mayor Presidencial; Deputy chief of the Estado Mayor Presidencial
- Awards: Honorary Knight Commander of the Order of the British Empire (United Kingdom)

Roberto Francisco Miranda Moreno (born 1955) is a Mexican General officer who served as the last chief of the Estado Mayor Presidencial (EMP), the institution charged with protecting and safeguarding the President of Mexico and the First Lady of Mexico. The institution was disbanded on December 1, 2018, by President Andrés Manuel López Obrador.

== Early life and education ==
Miranda Moreno was born in 1955 in the state of Morelos. He has a degree in Military Administration from the Escuela Superior de Guerra, a Master in Public Administration from the Instituto de Estudios Superiores en Administración Pública, and another in National Security from the Centro de Estudios Superiores Navales de la Marina. He also has a master's degree in Human Rights from National Autonomous University of Mexico.

Miranda Moreno was deputy chief of the Estado Mayor Presidencial (EMP), during President Felipe Calderón's six-year term.

He joined the EMP in 1995 where he carried out intelligence and counterintelligence tasks. He was also responsible for organizing the Presidential Guards Corps.

== Honours ==
- Honorary Knight Commander of the Most Excellent Order of the British Empire, Military division (KBE)
