= Foxilandia =

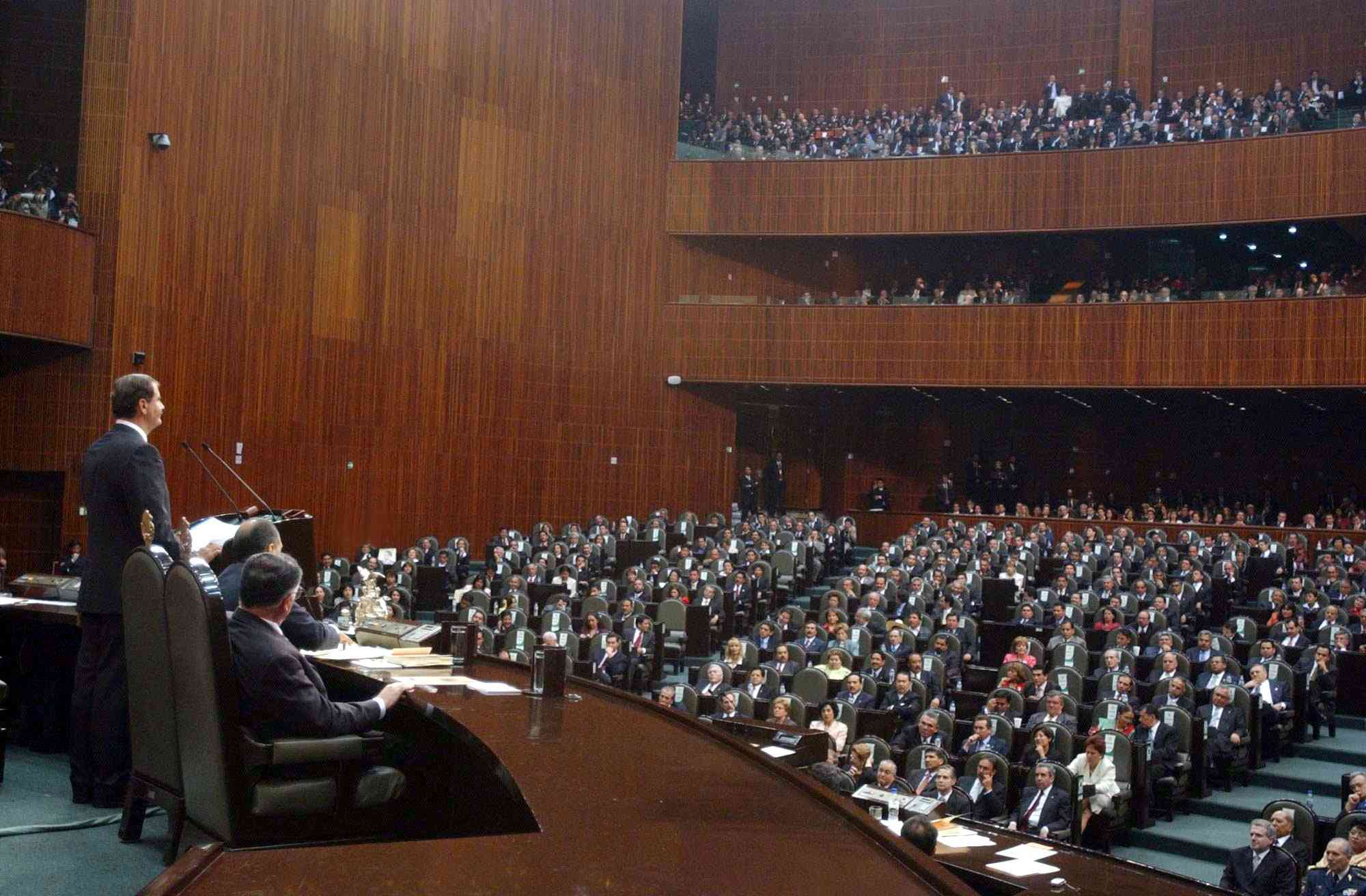
Vicente Fox before the Mexican Congress

Foxilandia is a critical term used in the Mexican political culture to make reference to the administration (2000–2006) of President Vicente Fox.

It was first used during the appearance of President Fox before the Congress of the Union in September 2004, in arguments by the opposition that Fox's vision of Mexico greatly differed from theirs. The connotation is that "Foxilandia", or Fox's vision, is impossible, unrealistic, a fantasy, while, in logical contrast, theirs would be balanced and realistic.

This term has been used by Vicente Fox in his radio program Fox Contigo ("Fox With You") Andrés Manuel López Obrador, and journalists from major newspapers in Mexico such as El Universal, La Jornada and Reforma. Foxilandia has also been used in political documentaries such as Aventuras en Foxilandia by Carlos Mendoza Aupetit, and Who is Mr. López by director Luis Mandoki and the film Un mundo maravilloso (2006) by film director Luis Estrada.

== Foxilandia by Luis Mandoki ==
Chapter 14 of Luis Mandoki's Who is Mr. López documentary is titled "Foxilandia") journalists Miguel Ángel Granados Chapa, Jaime Avilés and professors Denise Dresser (Autonomous Technological Institute of Mexico, ITAM) and Lorenzo Meyer (Colegio de México, COLMEX) and news anchor Joaquín López-Dóriga contrast Fox's official declarations with reality as well as Fox's campaign promises and its results such as:

- Economy growing at a 7% rate and creating 1,350,000 jobs, while the economy grew 0.7% from 2001-2003 and unemployment grew 188% Nevertheless, the rise in unemployment can be attributed to the record deficit in the United States.
- Promise of deep political change but the Undersecretary of Finance during Carlos Salinas's government became Secretary of Finance during Fox's term and the Secretary of Finance during Ernesto Zedillo's government became Governor of the Bank of Mexico.
- Fox highlighted a change in customs in Mexican politics by saying that in his term the President would not interfere with the electoral process. The documentary shows video-footage of several demonstrations of Fox supporting the candidates of the ruling party and of Alfonso Durazo, his former personal secretary, declaring that no previous President was ever as active campaigning for candidates of his own party as was Fox. However, it is widely known in Mexico that Presidents before Vicente Fox always handpicked their successor.

The term has also been used by Grupo Reforma to describe Fox's project of a library of his legacy in his hometown of San Francisco del Rincón, Guanajuato. The library, however, will be a project that is closely modeled after presidential libraries in the United States, showcasing objects and documents important to the Fox presidency.
