= Jorge Castañeda Gutman =

Mexican politician

Jorge Castañeda
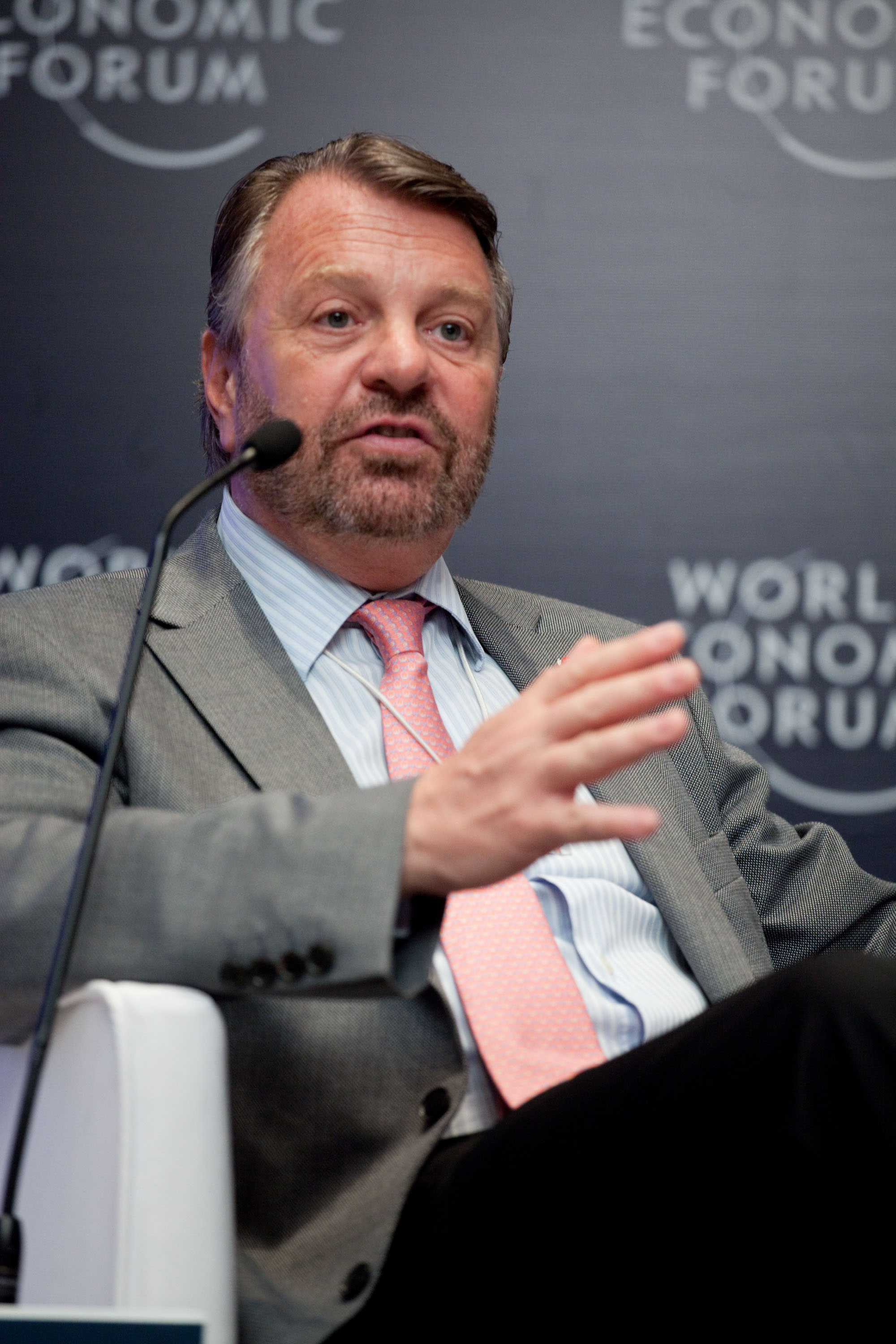
- Castañeda at the World Economic Forum on Latin America in 2011

Secretary of Foreign Affairs
- In office December 1, 2000 – January 10, 2003
- President: Vicente Fox
- Preceded by: Rosario Green
- Succeeded by: Luis Ernesto Derbez

Personal details
- Born: Jorge Castañeda Gutman; May 24, 1953 (age 73) Mexico City
- Party: Independent
- Education: Princeton University
- Profession: Professor, Politician

Jorge Castañeda Gutman (born May 24, 1953) is a Mexican politician and academic who served as Secretary of Foreign Affairs (2000–2003).

He also authored more than a dozen books, including a biography of Che Guevara, and he regularly contributes to newspapers such as Reforma (Mexico), El País (Spain), Los Angeles Times (USA) and Newsweek magazine. He was elected to the American Philosophical Society in 2008.

== Early life and education ==
Castañeda was born in Mexico City. His father was Jorge Castañeda y Álvarez de la Rosa who served as Secretary of Foreign Affairs (1979–1982), during the administration of José López Portillo.

He received the French Baccalauréat from the Lycée Franco-Mexicain in Mexico City. He graduated with an AB in history from Princeton University in 1973 after completing a 241-page long senior thesis titled "The Movement of the Revolutionary Left in Chile: 1965-1972." Then after receiving his PhD in Economic History from the University of Paris (Panthéon-La Sorbonne) he worked as a professor at several universities, including the National Autonomous University of Mexico, the University of California, Berkeley, Princeton University, New York University, and the University of Cambridge. He was a Bernard Schwartz fellow at The New America Foundation.

He was married to Miriam Morales (a Chilean citizen) and he has one son, Jorge Andrés.

== Academic books ==
Among his books is Utopia Unarmed: The Latin American Left After the Cold War (Vintage Books, 1993), an assessment of leftist politics in Latin America. The book has had a wide readership for its sometimes controversial overview of left-leaning politics in the region post-1990. Its main theme is a shift from politics based on the Cuban Revolution to politics based on broad-based new social movements, from armed revolutions to elections.

Another of Castañeda's well-known works is Compañero: The Life and Death of Che Guevara, which analyzes the Argentine Marxist revolutionary.

== Political career ==
Castañeda's political career began as a member of the Mexican Communist Party but he has since moved to the political center. He served as an advisor to Cuauhtémoc Cárdenas during his (failed) presidential campaign in 1988 and advised Vicente Fox during his (successful) presidential campaign in 2000.

After winning the election, Fox appointed Castañeda as his Secretary of Foreign Affairs.

Following a number of disagreements with other cabinet members Castañeda left the post in January 2003 and began traveling around the country, giving lectures and promoting his ideas. In July 2003, United Nations Secretary-General Kofi Annan appointed him to the United Nations Commission on the Private Sector and Development, which was co-chaired by Prime Minister Paul Martin of Canada and former President Ernesto Zedillo of Mexico.

=== Presidential candidacy ===
On March 25, 2004, Castañeda officially announced his presidential campaign by means of a prime-time campaign advertisement carried in all major Mexican television stations. He presented himself as an independent "citizens' candidate", a move contrary to Mexico's electoral law that gives registered parties alone the right to nominate candidates for election.

In 2004, Castañeda started to seek Court authorization to run in the country's 2006 presidential election without the endorsement of any of the registered political parties. In August 2005 the Supreme Court ruled against Castañeda's appeal. The ruling essentially put an end to Castañeda's bid to run as an independent candidate; however, soon after this ruling he took his case to the Inter-American Court of Human Rights in order to defend his political rights; in 2008 the IACHR found that the State violated the American Convention on Human Rights and ordered major electoral reform in the country.

=== Later career ===
In 2014, UN Secretary-General Ban Ki-moon appointed Castañeda as co-chair of a commission of inquiry to investigate human rights abuses in the Central African Republic, alongside Fatimata M'Baye and Bernard Acho Muna; within two months, however, Castañeda resigned from the position.

== Articles ==
He has published articles in Newsweek and writes regularly for Project Syndicate.

In a Newsweek article published in March 2009, he suggested that Hugo Chávez was plotting a coup in Cuba due to concerns that Raul Castro would make concessions that would betray the Cuban Revolution. According to his thesis, Hugo Chávez asked Leonel Fernández of the Dominican Republic to support the plot, but he declined. Castañeda's statements were met with scepticism from politicians and scholars. He has admitted that he has no proof, calling his thesis "informed speculation".

== Bibliography ==
- Nicaragua: Contradicciones en la Revolución (1980)
- Los últimos capitalismos. El capital financiero: México y los "nuevos países industrializados" (1982)
- México: El futuro en juego (1987)
- Limits on friendship: United States and Mexico (1989), co-authored with Robert A. Pastor
- La casa por la ventana (1993)
- Sorpresas te da la vida - México 1994. Editorial Aguilar (1995)
- The Mexican Shock (1995)
- Utopia unarmed (1995)
- The Estados Unidos Affair. Cinco ensayos sobre un "amor" oblicuo (1996)
- La vida en Rojo, una biografía del Ché Guevara (1997)
- La Herencia. Arqueología de la sucesión presidencial en México (1999)
- Somos Muchos: Ideas para el Mañana (2004)
- Ex Mex (2008)
- Mañana Forever?: Mexico and the Mexicans (2011)
- America through Foreign Eyes (2020)

== See also ==
- 2006 Mexican general election

Political offices
Preceded by Maria del Rosario Green Macías	Secretary of Foreign Affairs; 2000–2003	Succeeded by Luis Ernesto Derbez Bautista
