= Rafael Macedo de la Concha =

Mexican politician

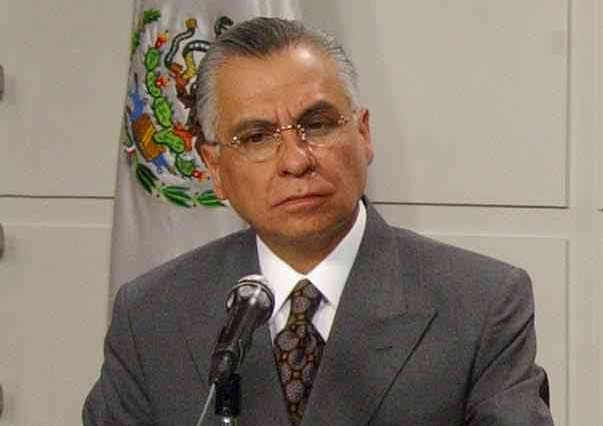
Gen. Rafael Macedo de la Concha

Rafael Macedo de la Concha (born May 6, 1950, in Mexico City) is a Mexican army general and former Attorney General in the cabinet of Vicente Fox (December 1, 2000 – April 27, 2005).

Macedo de la Concha has taught several law courses at the National Autonomous University of Mexico and at the Latin American University, where he chaired the law program. He has been assistant director of the Legal Fiduciary Department of the National Bank of Army, Navy and Air Force (Banjército) as well as judge and first magistrate of the Supreme Military Court.

Currently he is the military attaché at the Mexican Embassy in Rome.

Legal offices
| Preceded by Jorge Madrazo Cuéllar | Attorney General of Mexico; 2000—2005 | Succeeded by Daniel Cabeza de Vaca Hernández |
