= Luis Ernesto Derbez =

Mexican politician

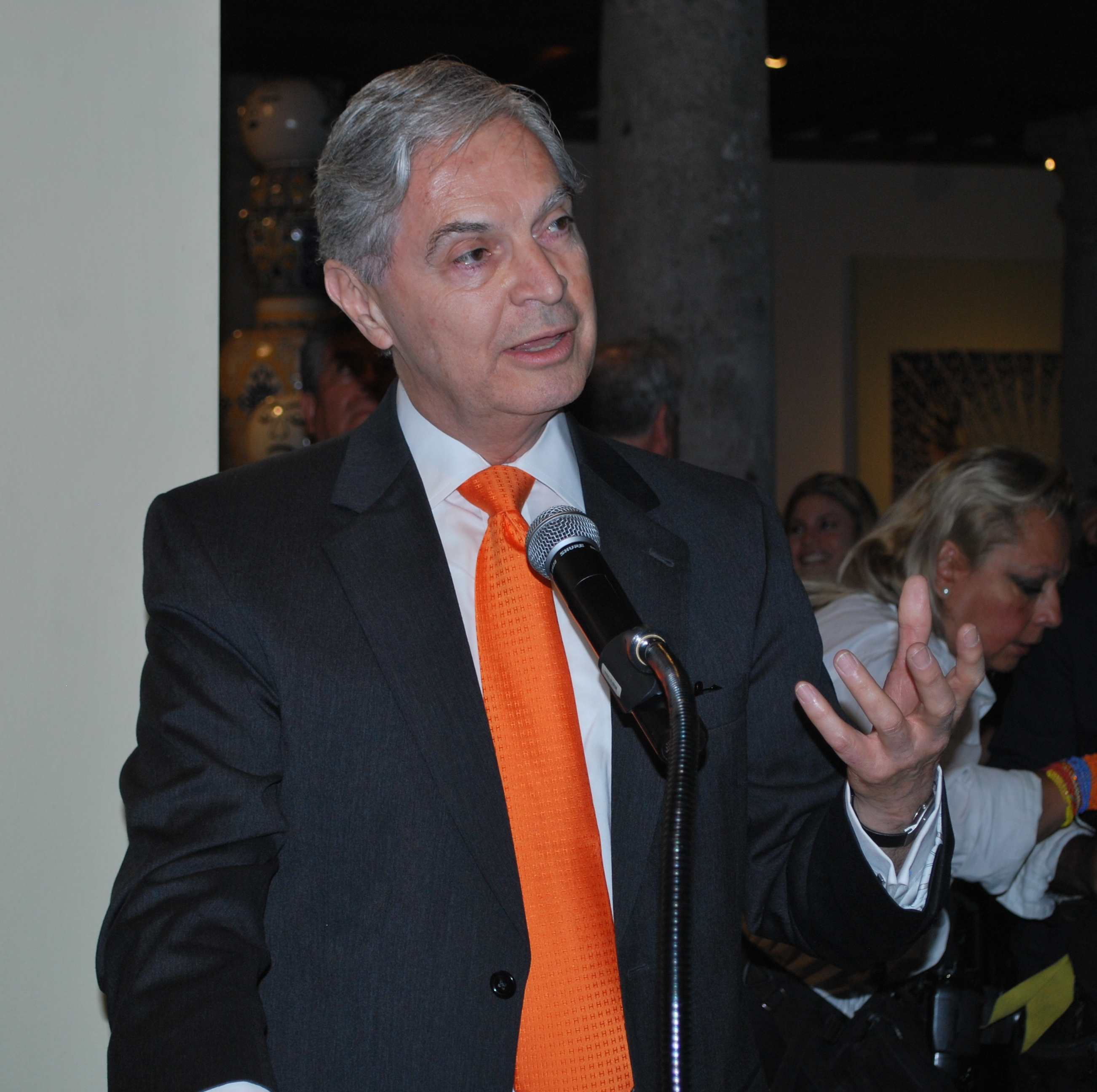
- Derbez speaking at the opening of a Uriarte Talavera exhibition at the Franz Mayer Museum

Secretary of Foreign Affairs
- In office January 15, 2003 – November 30, 2006
- President: Vicente Fox
- Preceded by: Jorge Castañeda
- Succeeded by: Patricia Espinosa

Secretary of Economy
- In office December 1, 2000 – January 10, 2003
- Preceded by: Herminio Blanco
- Succeeded by: Fernando Canales

Personal details
- Born: Luis Ernesto Derbez Bautista; April 1, 1947 (age 79) Mexico City
- Party: PAN
- Education: Universidad Autónoma de San Luis Potosí, University of Oregon, Iowa State University
- Profession: Economist

Luis Ernesto Derbez Bautista (born April 1, 1947, in Mexico City) is a Mexican politician and rector of the Universidad de las Américas Puebla (UDLAP). He served as Mexico's Secretary of Economy from 2000 to 2002 and Secretary of Foreign Affairs from 2003 to 2006.

== Early life and education ==
Luis Ernesto Derbez Bautista was born April 1, 1947, in Mexico City, Mexico. His parents were small business owners that ran a clothing factory that employed 20 workers.

He has a Bachelor's degree in 1970 in economics, from the Universidad Autónoma de San Luis Potosí, in San Luis Potosí City. He studied at the University of Oregon and has a Master's degree in economics. He earned a Doctorate in economics in 1980 from the Iowa State University in Ames, Iowa.

After graduating in 1980, Derbez was appointed vice rector for academics at the Universidad de las Américas Puebla in Puebla, Mexico.

Before joining the Fox campaign in 1997, he worked 14 years for the World Bank, managing economic adjustment programs in Africa, Asia and Central America. He also was a visiting professor at the Johns Hopkins University, within the School of Advanced International Studies. He began his career in politics in 2000.

== Political career ==
=== Secretary of Economy ===
Upon assuming power in December 2000, President Vicente Fox chose him to serve as his Secretary of Economy. As Minister of Economy, Derbez was in charge of Mexico's international trade negotiations. In 2001, he finalized the trade agreement between China and Mexico which allowed China's accession to the World Trade Organization (WTO), and led the Mexican team which defined the terms for a Free Trade Agreement between Mexico and Japan; in 2004 the FTA was signed. At the 2001 WTO's Ministerial Meetings in Qatar he was a member of the Director's Team which successfully negotiated the start of the Doha Development Round.

Following his participation, Derbez became the Chairman-elect for WTO's 2003 Ministerial Meeting. As such, during 2002 and 2003 he co-chaired preparatory Ministerial Meetings in Mexico, Sydney, Geneva, Sharm-el-Sheik, and Paris. In September 2003, Derbez chaired the WTO Ministerial Meeting which produced the so named Cancun Text that served as the basic text for follow up negotiations at the 2005 WTO's Hong Kong Ministerial Meeting. During that period, Derbez also played a key role in the successful outcome of the U.N. International Conference on Financing for Development held in Monterrey, Mexico, where developed nations agreed to contribute 0.7% of its GDP in development aid by the year 2015. Derbez also chaired the 2002 APEC Meeting in Los Cabos, Baja California.

In domestic issues, as Minister of Economy, Derbez proposed ten industrial policy programs for key sectors of the Mexican economy. By 2005, over $10 billion in new investments were attracted by those programs in the automotive, electronics, and maquiladora industries, allowing the nation to regain some of its presence in world markets despite the failure to reach structural economic reforms sought by the Fox government. He also created the Undersecretariat for Medium and Small Enterprises, and launched the successful Microcredit program PRONAFIM, which by 2005 had financed over 1.5 million microcredits.

=== Secretary of Foreign Affairs ===
In January 2003, following the resignation of Jorge Castañeda, Derbez took over as Secretary of Foreign Affairs, a position that he held until President Vicente Fox's term ended on December 1, 2006. As Minister of Foreign Affairs, Derbez has strengthened Mexico's bilateral and multilateral relations with the USA and Canada. Today, the Ministry of Foreign Affairs is a key player in the negotiations to improve NAFTA. Its work has led to a program entitled Security and Prosperity Agreement (ASPAN for its acronym in Spanish), launched in 2003 in Waco, Texas, by the three leaders of the North American countries. One of the major results of ASPAN was the constitution of a private-public Competitiveness Council which is defining sector specific policies to standardize the region's economic environment. Derbez has also played a key role in shaping the migration reform debate in the US by organizing and leading a group of 10 Latin American countries (from Mexico to Ecuador), which has presented a common position in discussions with key Senators and Representatives of the US Congress.

Reversing a 15-year trend, Derbez has refocused Mexico's policy towards Latin America. At the sub-regional level, increased cooperation with the seven Central American countries has resulted in the creation of the Mesoamerican Group, which currently defines common sub-regional policies in energy development, border security, fight against organized crime, and regional infrastructure. Under Derbez's leadership, Mexico gained associated status in the Andean Countries Group and MERCOSUR, while at the same time signed a strategic, political, and economic alliance with Chile. On the other hand, he gave high priority to the Asia Pacific region. In addition to the FTA with Japan, Mexico created a Ministerial Level Commission with China, the only one of this kind that China has. Under his leadership, Mexico initiated negotiations agreements with India's government in the technology and pharmaceutical sectors.

While representing Mexico at the UN Security Council during the Iraq crisis, Derbez realized that a major overhaul of the UN system was required. In 2004, Mexico invited 15 nations to form a group called Friends of the Reform, to propose administrative and organizational changes for the UN. He also organized another 16 nations into a group named United for a Consensus, to propose reforms to the UN Security Council. The proposals of both groups played a major role in the reform decisions approved by the UN Assembly in September 2005.

Since January 2007, Luis Ernesto Derbez has been the General Director of the Centre for Globalization, Competitiveness and Democracy at the Instituto Tecnológico de Monterrey, Campus Santa Fe, and Secretary for International Affairs of the PAN. Between January 2003 and December 2006, he was the Minister of Foreign Affairs of Mexico; and between December 2000 and December 2002, he was the Minister of Economy. From July to November 2000, he chaired President-elect Vicente Fox transition team, which defined Mexico's 2000-2006 economic and social programs.

== Awards and memberships ==
Derbez was a member of the Board of Directors of PEMEX and Pemex International (PMI), Banco Nacional de Comercio Exterior (Bancomext), and Mexico's Science and Technology Council (CONACYT). In 2001 and 2002, he was Chairman of the Board for Exportadora de Sal, S.A. and Transportes de Sal, S.A., joint ventures between the Mexican Government and the Mitsubishi Corporation.

He was granted by Iowa State University the Distinguished Achievement Alumni Award in 2006, the first time ever given to a non-US national.

== Personal life ==
Derbez is married and has 2 daughters. He has published many articles and book chapters, and has lectured extensively in many countries. He speaks fluently Spanish, English and French. Derbez is a member of Sigma Xi and Phi Kappa Phi.

Political offices
Preceded by Jorge Castañeda Gutman	Secretary of Foreign Affairs; 2003 –2006	Succeeded by Patricia Espinosa
Preceded by Herminio Blanco	Secretary of Economy; 2000 – 2003	Succeeded by Fernando Canales Clariond
