= Benjamín Medrano Quezada =

Mexican politician (1966–2026)

Federal deputy for Zacatecas's 1st district
- In office 29 August 2015 – 31 August 2018
- Preceded by: Adolfo Bonilla Gómez
- Succeeded by: Mirna Zabeida Maldonado Tapia

Municipal president of Fresnillo, Zacatecas
- In office 15 September 2013 – 6 November 2015
- Preceded by: Cecilia del Muro
- Succeeded by: Gilberto Eduardo Dévora Hernández

Personal details
- Born: 16 August 1966 Nochistlán, Zacatecas, Mexico
- Died: 7 July 2026 (aged 59) Guadalajara, Jalisco, Mexico
- Party: PRI (2011–2026)
- Other political affiliations: PT (until 2011)
- Education: Universidad Autónoma de Zacatecas

Benjamín Medrano Quezada (16 August 1966 – 7 July 2026) was a Mexican politician affiliated with the Institutional Revolutionary Party (PRI). He served as a Zacatecas state congressman from 2010 to 2013 and, on 7 July 2013, he was elected municipal president of Fresnillo, the largest municipality in the state of Zacatecas.

According to press reports, he became the first openly gay citizen in the history of Mexico to be elected municipal president. He was not, however, the first openly gay Mexican citizen to be elected to a political post, as the country has elected openly gay and lesbian congresspeople since 1997.

== Early life ==
Benjamín Medrano Quezada was born in Nochistlán, Zacatecas, on 16 August 1966, into a poor family with eleven siblings. As a child, he toured both Mexico and the United States as a musician for performers María Victoria and Angélica María.

Later, he graduated from the Autonomous University of Zacatecas with a bachelor's degree in law and, at the age of 21, led a local chapter of a trade union for professional musicians. Eventually, he became a businessman, recording several albums of ballads and ranchera music and establishing a gay nightclub around 1994.

== Political career ==
Medrano entered politics in 1995 as a city councilor in the state capital, the city of Zacatecas; three years later, he became an ally of Ricardo Monreal, an influential politician in the state who had quit the PRI to continue his career in several parties of the political left. Later, Medrano became chief adviser to Governor Amalia García of the Party of the Democratic Revolution (PRD). He joined the cabinet of David Monreal (a brother of Ricardo) in Fresnillo's city council. In 2010, he became a state deputy for the Labor Party (PT), but left the organization in 2011 when the party nominated someone else to run for federal deputy in his political district. He remained in the legislature and presided over the Finance Commission.

The Fresnillo area is a largely rural region with a high level of violent crimes related to the drug wars. The municipality covers some 258 villages that are, according to Medrano, "full of tough country people, who don't have much information about what is going on elsewhere".

He ran on a campaign of public safety against a smear campaign from his former party that focused on his homosexuality, and alleged embezzlement of public funds. In his platform, he also promised to crack down on police corruption, restore security and gain control over the drug cartels. While Medrano was vocal about his homosexuality and has publicly defended transvestites' labor rights, he opposed same-sex marriage and adoption, LGBT pride parades, "flamboyant" homosexuality, gay prostitution and abortion. He was named president of the Commission for Attention to Rural Municipalities, part of the national organization of the National Federation of Municipalities of Mexico (FENAMM).

In 2015, Medrano ran for and won a seat in the Chamber of Deputies for the 63rd Congress, representing the first district of Zacatecas, based in Fresnillo. He served on five commissions: a special commission for the Pueblos Mágicos, Radio and Television, Committee for the Center of Law Studies and Parliamentary Research, Federal District, and Constitutional Points.

In October 2015, Medrano sought to leave the Chamber of Deputies for a year and finish his term as mayor of Fresnillo; ultimately, after negotiations between Medrano and officials in Zacatecas, he remained in the Chamber of Deputies and opted to permanently leave the municipal presidency of Fresnillo.

== Assassination ==
Medrano Quezada was assassinated on 7 July 2026 in Guadalajara, Jalisco, where he was shot inside an ice cream shop. He was 59.
