= 2004 Mexican elections =

Mexican election

A number of local elections took place in Mexico during 2004 in 14 of the 31 states:

== June 20, 2004 ==
=== Yucatán ===
  - State congress, and mayors.
  - See: 2004 Yucatán state election

== July 4, 2004 ==
=== Chihuahua ===
  - Governor, state congress, and mayors.
  - See: 2004 Chihuahua state election

=== Durango ===
  - Governor, state congress, and mayors.
  - See: 2004 Durango state election

=== Zacatecas ===
  - Governor, state congress, and mayors.
  - See: 2004 Zacatecas state election

=== Baja California ===
  - State congress and five mayors.
  - See: 2004 Baja California state election

== August 1, 2004 ==
=== Aguascalientes ===
  - Governor, state congress, and mayors.
  - See: 2004 Aguascalientes state election

=== Oaxaca ===
  - Governor, state congress, and mayors.
  - See: 2004 Oaxaca state election

== September 15, 2004 ==
=== Veracruz ===
  - Governor, state congress, and mayors.
  - See: 2004 Veracruz state election

== October 3, 2004 ==
=== Tamaulipas ===
  - Governor, state congress, and mayors.
  - See: 2004 Tamaulipas state election

== October 17, 2004 ==
=== Chiapas ===
  - State congress and mayors.
  - See: 2004 Chiapas state election

== November 14, 2004 ==
=== Michoacán ===
  - State congress, and mayors.
  - See: 2004 Michoacán state election

=== Puebla ===
  - Governor, state congress, and mayors.
  - See: 2004 Puebla state election

=== Sinaloa ===
  - Governor, state congress, and mayors.
  - See: 2004 Sinaloa state election

=== Tlaxcala ===
  - Governor, state congress, and mayors.
  - See: 2004 Tlaxcala state election

== See also ==
- Politics of Mexico
- List of political parties in Mexico
