= Magdalena Núñez Monreal =

Mexican politician

- Born: 13 January 1959 (age 67); Fresnillo, Zacatecas, Mexico
- Title: Public Accountant
- Political party: PT
- Website: magdanunez.mx

Magdalena del Socorro Núñez Monreal (born 13 January 1959) is a Mexican politician affiliated with the Labor Party (PT) and formerly with the Party of the Democratic Revolution (PRD).

Núñez served as the municipal president of Zacatecas from 1998 to 2000. She has also served in the Chamber of Deputies on three occasions: from 2000 to 2003, representing the third district of Zacatecas for the PRD; again from 2012 to 2015, as a second region plurinominal deputy for the PT; and most recently from 2021 to 2024, from the PT's plurinominal list for the fourth region.

She was the PT nominee for Governor of Zacatecas in 2016.
