= Bennelly Hernández Ruedas =

Bennelly Jocabeth Hernández Ruedas (born September 7, 1989) is a Mexican politician affiliated with the National Regeneration Movement party. Since September 1, 2021, she has been a federal representative in the LXV Legislature of the Congress of the Union.

== Education ==
Born in Fresnillo, Zacatecas, Bennelly Jocabeth Hernández Ruedas earned a bachelor's degree in secondary education at the Centro de Actualización del Magisterio de Zacatecas and a master's degree in public administration at the Universidad CUGS Cuauhtémoc.

== Political career ==
She has been a member of the Labor Party and the National Regeneration Movement party. In 2013 she was a candidate for councilor of Fresnillo. In the 2015 federal elections, she was elected as a substitute for Alicia Barrientos Pantoja, federal deputy for the 12th district of Mexico City, based in the Cuauhtémoc delegation. From 2015 to 2018 she was general director of social development in the Cuauhtémoc delegation during the administration of Ricardo Monreal.

In the 2021 federal elections, she was elected as a federal deputy in the LXV Legislature of the Congress of the Union representing District 1 of Zacatecas, based in Fresnillo. Within the congress she is secretary of the Social Security Commission and of the Social Economy and Cooperative Development Commission.

== Controversies ==
On July 19, 2015, she was arrested along with two other women at the Tapachula International Airport, Chiapas, in possession of one million Mexican pesos, of which they could not explain their origin or prove that they were not of illicit origin. The Attorney General's Office decided to initiate an investigation into the matter, during which Bennelly Hernández and her companion were allowed to remain free after they claimed that the money was intended to finance the activities of the National Regeneration Movement party. Subsequently, their innocence and the lawful origin of the money were clarified.
