= 1st federal electoral district of Zacatecas =

Federal electoral district of Mexico

Zacatecas's 1st
- Electoral district of the Chamber of Deputies of Mexico

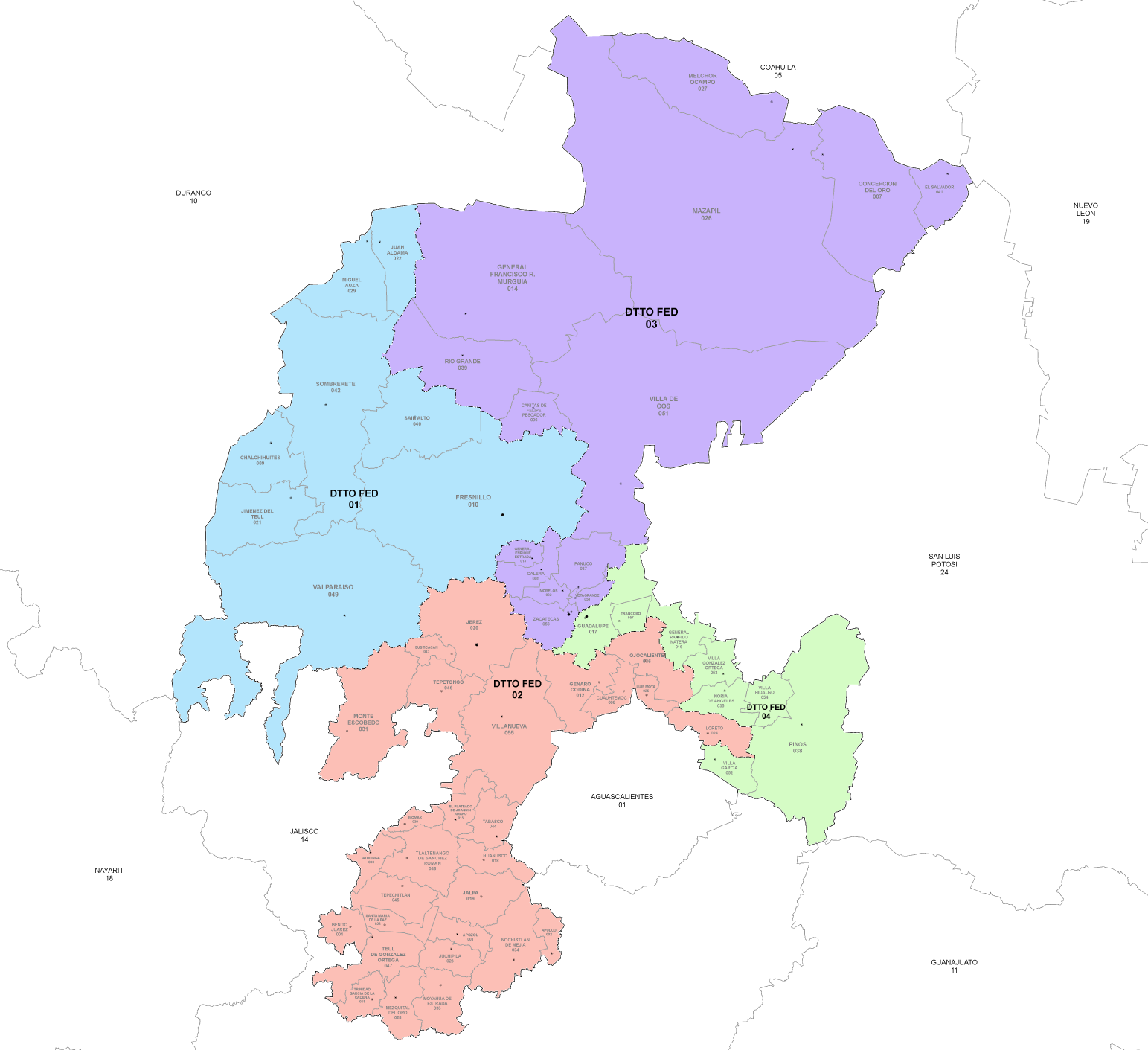
- 1st district since 2023

Incumbent
- Member: Soledad Luévano Cantú
- Party: ▌Morena
- Congress: 66th (2024–2027)

District
- State: Zacatecas
- Head town: Fresnillo
- Coordinates: 23°10′N 102°52′W
- Covers: Chalchihuites, Fresnillo, Jiménez del Teul, Juan Aldama, Miguel Auza, Saín Alto, Sombrerete, Valparaíso
- PR region: Second
- Precincts: 465
- Population: 416,468 (2020 census)

The 1st federal electoral district of Zacatecas (Spanish: Distrito electoral federal 01 de Zacatecas) is one of the 300 electoral districts into which Mexico is divided for elections to the federal Chamber of Deputies and one of four such districts in the state of Zacatecas.

It elects one deputy to the lower house of Congress for each three-year legislative period, by means of the first-past-the-post system. Votes cast in the district also count towards the calculation of proportional representation ("plurinominal") deputies elected from the second region.

The current member for the district, elected in the 2024 general election, is Soledad Luévano Cantú of the National Regeneration Movement (Morena).

== District territory ==
Evolution of electoral district numbers
| | 1974 | 1978 | 1996 | 2005 | 2017 | 2023 |
|---|---|---|---|---|---|---|
| Zacatecas | 4 | 5 | 5 | 4 | 4 | 4 |
| Chamber of Deputies | 196 | 300 | | | | |

Under the 2023 districting plan adopted by the National Electoral Institute (INE), which is to be used for the 2024, 2027 and 2030 federal elections, the 1st district of Zacatecas covers 465 electoral precincts (secciones electorales) across eight municipalities in the western portion of the state:

- Chalchihuites, Fresnillo, Jiménez del Teul, Juan Aldama, Miguel Auza, Saín Alto, Sombrerete and Valparaíso.

The head town (cabecera distrital), where results from individual polling stations are gathered together and tallied, is the city of Fresnillo. The district reported a population of 416,468 in the 2020 census.

== Deputies returned to Congress ==
(Mexico) National parties
- Current
- PAN
- PRI
- PT
- PVEM
- MC
- Morena
- PAZ
- Somos
- Defunct or local only
- PLM
- PNR
- PRM
- PNM
- PP
- PPS
- PARM
- PFCRN
- CON
- PANAL
- PSD
- PES
- PES
- PRD

Zacatecas's 1st district
| Election | Deputy | Party | Term | Legislature |
|---|---|---|---|---|
| 1961 | Alfonso Méndez Barraza | Institutional Revolutionary Party | 1961–1964 | 45th Congress |
| 1964 | Aurora Navia Millán | Institutional Revolutionary Party | 1964–1967 | 46th Congress |
| 1967 | Calixto Medina Medina | Institutional Revolutionary Party | 1967–1970 | 47th Congress |
| 1970 | Raúl Rodríguez Santoyo | Institutional Revolutionary Party | 1970–1973 | 48th Congress |
| 1973 | Luis Arturo Contreras Serrano | Institutional Revolutionary Party | 1973–1976 | 49th Congress |
| 1976 | Gustavo Salinas Íñiguez | Institutional Revolutionary Party | 1976–1979 | 50th Congress |
| 1979 | Arturo Romo Gutiérrez | Institutional Revolutionary Party | 1979–1982 | 51st Congress |
| 1982 | Genaro Borrego Estrada | Institutional Revolutionary Party | 1982–1985 | 52nd Congress |
| 1985 | Yrene Ramos Dávila | Institutional Revolutionary Party | 1985–1988 | 53rd Congress |
| 1988 | Julián Ibargüengoytia Cabral | Institutional Revolutionary Party | 1988–1991 | 54th Congress |
| 1991 | Marco Antonio Olvera Acevedo | Institutional Revolutionary Party | 1991–1994 | 55th Congress |
| 1994 | Yrene Ramos Dávila | Institutional Revolutionary Party | 1994–1997 | 56th Congress |
| 1997 | José Eulogio Bonilla Robles | Institutional Revolutionary Party | 1997–2000 | 57th Congress |
| 2000 | Alfonso Elías Cardona | Party of the Democratic Revolution | 2000–2003 | 58th Congress |
| 2003 | Guillermo Huízar Carranza | Party of the Democratic Revolution | 2003–2006 | 59th Congress |
| 2006 | Susana Monreal Ávila | Party of the Democratic Revolution | 2006–2009 | 60th Congress |
| 2009 | Gerardo Leyva Hernández | Party of the Democratic Revolution | 2009–2012 | 61st Congress |
| 2012 | Adolfo Bonilla Gómez | Institutional Revolutionary Party | 2012–2015 | 62nd Congress |
| 2015 | Benjamín Medrano Quezada (Note: Medrano Quezada took a leave of absence from his seat from 30 March 2018 to 2 July 2018.); José Luis Velázquez González | Institutional Revolutionary Party | 2015–2018; 2018 | 63rd Congress |
| 2018 | Mirna Zabeida Maldonado Tapia | National Regeneration Movement | 2018–2021 | 64th Congress |
| 2021 | Bennelly Hernández Ruedas | National Regeneration Movement | 2021–2024 | 65th Congress |
| 2024 | Soledad Luévano Cantú | National Regeneration Movement | 2024–2027 | 66th Congress |

== Presidential elections ==
Zacatecas's 1st district
| Election | District won by | Party or coalition | % |
|---|---|---|---|
| 2018 | Andrés Manuel López Obrador | Juntos Haremos Historia | 50.9438 |
| 2024 | Claudia Sheinbaum Pardo | Sigamos Haciendo Historia | 48.4922 |
