= Gerardo Leyva Hernández =

Mexican politician

- Born: 11 May 1967 (age 59); Ejido de Chichimequillas, Fresnillo, Zacatecas, Mexico
- Occupation: Politician
- Political party: PRD

Gerardo Leyva Hernández (born 11 May 1967) is a Mexican politician from the Party of the Democratic Revolution (PRD). From 2009 to 2012 he served as a federal deputy in the 61st Congress, representing Zacatecas's first district.
