= Susana Monreal Ávila =

Mexican politician

- Born: 11 August 1971 (age 54); Zacatecas, Mexico
- Occupation: Politician
- Political party: PRD
- Relatives: David Monreal Ávila (brother); Ricardo Monreal Ávila (brother); Saúl Monreal Ávila (brother)

Susana Monreal Ávila (born 11 August 1971) is a Mexican politician. From 2006 to 2009 she served as a federal deputy in the 60th Congress, representing Zacatecas's first district for the Party of the Democratic Revolution (PRD).

She is the sister of former governor of Zacatecas Ricardo Monreal Ávila.
