= Guillermo Huízar =

Mexican politician

- Born: 25 June 1961 (age 64); Fresnillo, Zacatecas, Mexico
- Education: UAZ
- Occupation: Politician
- Political party: PRD

Guillermo Huízar Carranza (born 25 June 1961) is a Mexican politician affiliated with the Party of the Democratic Revolution (PRD). In the 2003 mid-terms he was elected to the Chamber of Deputies to represent the first district of Zacatecas during the 59th session of Congress.
