= Huizar =

Huizar or Huízar is a surname. Notable people with the surname include:

- Candelario Huízar (1882–1970), Mexican composer, musician, and music teacher
- Guillermo Huízar (born 1961), Mexican politician
- José Huizar (born 1968), Mexican-American politician
- Laura Elena Zúñiga Huizar (born 1985), Mexican model and beauty queen
- Makaio Huizar (born 2007), Mexican/Filipino/American Singer-Songwriter
