= 2004 Zacatecas state election =

Local election in Mexico

The Mexican state of Zacatecas held an election on Sunday, 4 July 2004. At stake was the office of the Zacatecas State Governor, all 30 members of the unicameral Zacatecas State Congress, and 57 mayors and municipal councils.

Turnout was in excess of 50% of the 935,548 zacatecanos eligible to vote.

== Governor ==
At the time of the election, the sitting governor was Ricardo Monreal Ávila of the Party of the Democratic Revolution (PRD).

Candidate	Party	Votes	%
Amalia García	PRD	110,883	47%
José Bonilla	"Alliance for Zacatecas" (PRI/PT/PVEM)	76,186	33%
Francisco López G.	PAN	39,873	17%
Elías Barajas	CD	7,305	3%
Totals		234,247	100%

At 22h30, with results from 46% of the polling stations counted, the victory of Amalia García, with a 35,000 vote lead, seemed inevitable.

== State congress ==
- 18 first-past-the-post districts:
  - PRD leading in 15
  - PRI/Alliance leading in 3
- 12 proportional representation seats
  - calculation pending

== Municipalities ==
Of the state's 57 municipalities:

- PRD leading in 28 (including state capital Zacatecas, Fresnillo, and Guadalupe)
- PRI leading in 12
- PAN leading in 11 (including Jerez)
- PT leading in 2
- CD leading in 1

== A.O.B. ==
- In separate press conferences, all three of the other candidates said they did not recognize García's victory and would be challenging the result before the electoral courts.

== On the same day ==
- 2004 Chihuahua state election
- 2004 Durango state election

== See also ==
- Politics of Mexico
- List of political parties in Mexico
