= David Monreal =

Mexican politician

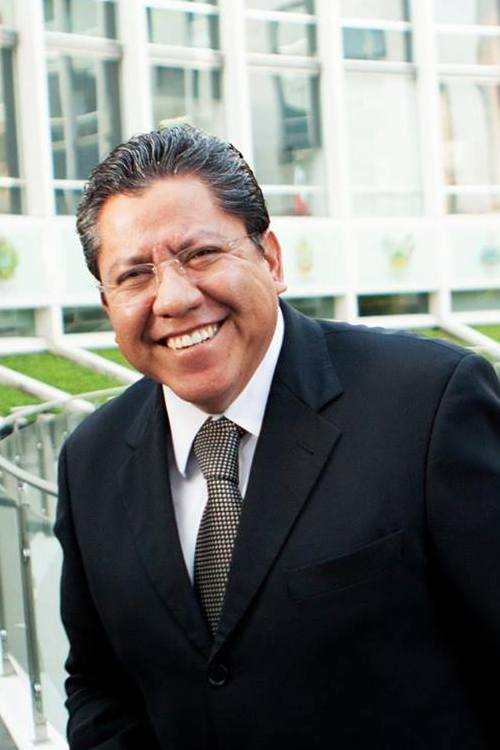
- Monreal in 2015

Governor of Zacatecas
- Incumbent
- Assumed office 12 September 2021
- Preceded by: Alejandro Tello Cristerna

Personal details
- Born: David Monreal Ávila; 27 March 1966 (age 60) Fresnillo, Zacatecas, Mexico
- Party: MORENA
- Relatives: Ricardo Monreal Ávila (brother); Saúl Monreal Ávila (brother); Susana Monreal Ávila (sister)
- Education: Autonomous University of Zacatecas
- Occupation: Politician

David Monreal Ávila (born 27 March 1966) is a Mexican politician affiliated to the National Regeneration Movement (Morena). He is the current governor of Zacatecas. As a member of the Labor Party, he served as senator of the LXII Legislature of the Mexican Congress representing Zacatecas. He also served as municipal president of Fresnillo from 2007 until 2010.
