= List of municipal presidents of Zacatecas City =

Following is a list of municipal presidents of Zacatecas City, in the Mexican state of Zacatecas:

Term	Municipal president	Political party	Notes
1940	Pablo Robles García	PRM	
1940	J. Santos Quiñónez	PRM	
1941	Rafael López	PRM	
1942	José A. Machiavelo	PRM	
1943	Agustín Tovar Moreno	PRM	
1944	Higinio Natera Vital	PRM	
1945–1946	Luis de la Fuente	PRM	
1947–1948	José Cabral Román	PRI	
1950	Belén Márquez	PRI	
1950–1952	Roque Acevedo Díaz	PRI	
1953–1955	Francisco Borrego Delgado	PRI	
1956–1958	Roque Acevedo Díaz	PRI	
1959–1961	Francisco Borrego Delgado	PRI	
1962–1964	Manuel Rivapalacio	PRI	
1965–1967	José López Cortés	PRI	
1968–1970	Raúl Rodríguez Santoyo	PRI	
1970	Guillermo Rubio Cervantes	PRI	
1971–1973	Roberto Valadez García	PRI	
1974–1976	Victorio de la Torre de la Torre	PRI	
1977–1979	Francisco J. Alonso Bernal	PRI	
1980–1981	J. Benito López Domínguez	PRI	
1981–1982	José Escobedo Domínguez	PRI	
1983–1985	Jesús Manuel Díaz Casas	PRI	
1985	J. Antonio Villa Fonseca	PRI	
1986–1988	Raúl Rodríguez Santoyo	PRI	
1989–1992	Jesús Manuel Díaz Casas	PRI	
1992–1995	Javier Suárez del Real Berumen	PRI	
1995–1997	José Manuel Maldonado Romero	PRI	
1997–1998	Julián Ibargüengoytia Cabral	PRI	
15/09/1998–01/03/2000	Magdalena Núñez Monreal	PRD	
2000–2001	Pedro Goytia Robles	PRD	
2001–2004	Miguel Alonso Reyes	PRD	
2004–2007	Gerardo de Jesús Félix Domínguez	PRD	
2007	Abel Zapata Ibarra	PRD	Acting municipal president
2007–2010	Cuauhtémoc Calderón Galván	PAN	
2010	Jesús López Zamora	PAN	Acting municipal president
2010–2013	Arnoldo Alfredo Rodríguez Reyes	PRI; PVEM; Panal	
2013–2016	Carlos Aurelio Peña Badillo	PRI	Applied for a temporary leave
2016	Alfredo Salazar de Santiago	PRI	Acting municipal president
15/09/2016–08/01/2017	Catarino Martínez Díaz		President of the Citizen Council, appointed by the Legislative Power of the State of Zacatecas
09/01/2017–2018	Judit Guerrero López	PRI; PVEM; Panal	Coalition "Zacatecas First"
2018–19/03/2021	Ulises Mejía Haro	PT; Morena; PES	Coalition "Together We Will Make History". He applied for a temporary leave to run for the deputation of the local electoral district 1, backed by the Solidary Encounter Party. His name did not appear on the electoral ballot because he exercised gender violence against the syndic of the Zacatecas City Council, Ruth Calderón Babún, according to a resolution issued by the Zacatecas Electoral Court of Justice. He did not obtain the sought local deputation
19/03/2021–14/09/2021	Salvador Estrada González		Substitute, appointed by the Legislative Power of the State of Zacatecas
15/09/2021–15/09/2024	Jorge Miranda Castro	PT; PVEM; Morena; Panal	
2024–	Miguel Ángel Varela Pinedo	PAN; PRI; PRD	
