= Judit Guerrero López =

Mexican politician

Judit Magdalena Guerrero
- Born: 4 April 1961 (age 65); Villa Hidalgo, Zacatecas, Mexico
- Education: Autonomous University of Zacatecas
- Occupation: Deputy
- Political party: PRI

Judit Magdalena Guerrero López (born 4 April 1961) is a Mexican politician affiliated with the Institutional Revolutionary Party (PRI).

At the federal level, she served as a deputy in the 62nd Congress (2012–2015), representing Zacatecas's third district, as well as a senator for Zacatecas during the 59th Congress (2003–2006). She previously served in the 54th session of the Congress of Zacatecas at the state level.

Guerrero served as the municipal president of Zacatecas, representing a coalition of the PRI, PVEM and PANAL, from 2017 to 2018.
