= Alejandro Tello Cristerna =

Governor of Zacatecas, Mexico

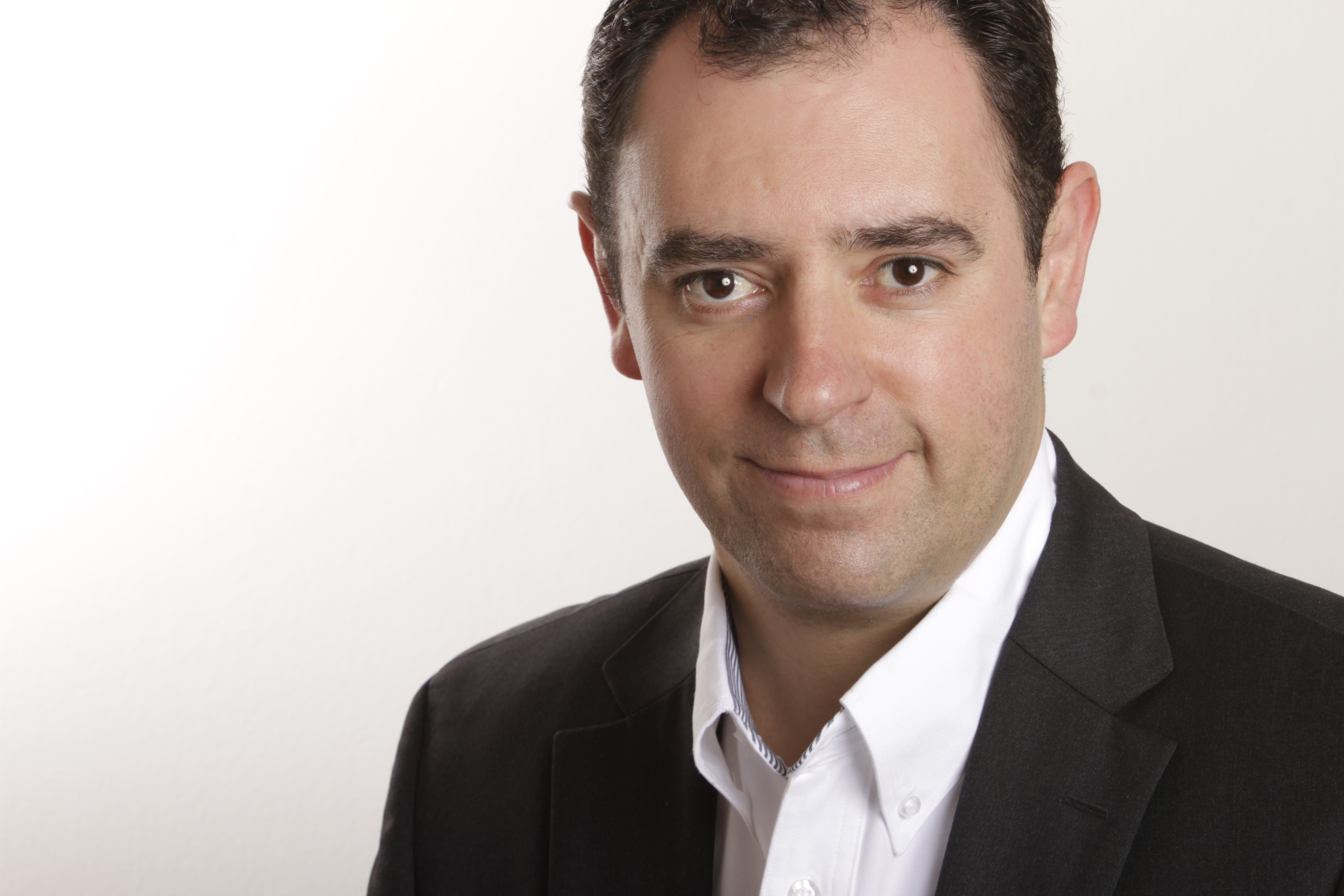

Governor of Zacatecas
- In office September 12, 2016 – September 11, 2021
- Preceded by: Miguel Alonso Reyes
- Succeeded by: David Monreal Ávila

Personal details
- Born: 30 May 1971 (age 54) Zacatecas, Mexico
- Party: PRI
- Children: 2 (Fernando, Elena)
- Education: Autonomous University of Zacatecas (BBA)
- Occupation: Politician

Alejandro Tello Cristerna (born 30 May 1971) is a Mexican politician affiliated with the PRI. He served as the Governor of Zacatecas from 2016 to 2021, and also represented the state as a senator during the LXII Legislature of the Mexican Congress and first four months of the LXIII Legislature.

== Life ==
Tello was born in 1971 and received his undergraduate degree in Public Accounting from the Universidad Autónoma de Zacatecas. After graduation, Tello worked in the private sector; he served as an auditor to CONALEP, and from 1994 to 2000, he directed Bancomer's banking operations in the Zacatecas towns of Ojocaliente, Calera and Jerez.

In 2000, Tello took his first public service position, becoming the administrative coordinator for the office of the Governor of Zacatecas. The next year, he became the treasurer of Zacatecas City, a position he would hold for three years.

In 2005, he became the manager of institutional relations for Grupo Modelo in Zacatecas; the same year, he became an active member of the PRI. It was during this time that he began getting involved in PRI tasks; he promoted the business vote in the 2007 PRI campaign in Juchipila, and he has a son named Fernando Tello Rodriguez and three years later, he managed the finances for the PRI's state gubernatorial campaign and then served as the technical secretary of the state government transition committee; these positions prepared him for becoming the state finance secretary between 2010 and 2012. From 2011 to 2014, Tello was a state councilor for the PRI in Zacatecas.

=== Senate ===
Tello won election to the Senate in 2012, receiving the most votes of any candidate in state history. He represented Zacatecas in the LXII Legislature of the Mexican Congress, as well as the first four months of the LXIII Legislature. He presided over the Science and Technology Commission and also served on the Social Development, Finances and Public Credit, and Foreign Relations-North America Commissions.

=== Governor ===
In January 2016, Tello departed the Senate in order to seek election as governor of Zacatecas; he was replaced by his alternate, José Marco Antonio Olvera Acevedo. On February 7, the PRI named him candidate under the banner Primero Zacatecas, an alliance that also included the PVEM and Nueva Alianza.

In the June 5 elections, Tello won election with 37.3 percent of the vote.
