= Adolfo Bonilla Gómez =

Mexican politician

- Born: 7 January 1972 (age 54); Fresnillo, Zacatecas, Mexico
- Education: ITESM
- Political party: PRI

Adolfo Bonilla Gómez (born 7 January 1972) is a Mexican politician affiliated with the Institutional Revolutionary Party (PRI). In 2012 he was elected to the Chamber of Deputies, representing Zacatecas's first district.
