= Miguel Alonso Reyes =

Mexican politician

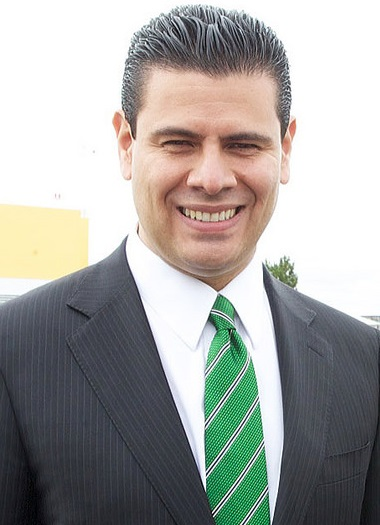

Governor of Zacatecas
- In office 12 September 2010 – 11 September 2016
- Preceded by: Amalia García
- Succeeded by: Alejandro Tello Cristerna

Personal details
- Born: Miguel Alejandro Alonso Reyes; September 20, 1971 (age 54) Zacatecas, Zacatecas
- Party: Institutional Revolutionary Party
- Education: Universidad Panamericana Sede México
- Occupation: Politician
- Profession: Lawyer

Miguel Alejandro Alonso Reyes (born September 20, 1971) is a Mexican politician member of the Institutional Revolutionary Party (PRI), and former governor of Zacatecas.

== Early career ==
Miguel Alonso Reyes coursed his basic education in the city of Zacatecas and graduated as a lawyer from the Universidad Panamericana in Mexico City. He began his public activities in 1993 serving as deputy secretary to Mexico's ambassador in the United Kingdom, José Juan de Olloqui Labastida. In 1995 he was member of the coordination of advisers to Social Development Secretary Carlos Rojas Gutierrez, and subsequently held advisory positions in the Senate. In 1998, along with Ricardo Monreal he renounced his militancy in the PRI and joined the Party of the Democratic Revolution (PRD), serving as private secretary to Monreal, the PRD candidate for governor of Zacatecas and later as his private secretary. He held this position from 1998 until 2001, when he resigned to contend for mayor of Zacatecas, winning the elections and holding office for the 2001-2004 period

== Return to PRI and Governor of Zacatecas ==
In 2004, under Governor Amalia García, he was appointed head of the Zacatecas State Tourism Council and from 2005 on, Secretary of Tourism of the state. He resigned in 2007 to become a candidate and elected member of the State Congress of Zacatecas for the 1st Local Electoral District of Zacatecas for the 2007-2010 period. On February 22, 2009 he renounced PRD militancy and declared himself an independent politician. On June 18 of that same year he returned as member of the PRI and was nominated as candidate for state governor under this party.

He was elected governor in the July 5, 2010 elections and took office on September 12 of the same year.

Preceded by Amalia García	Governor of Zacatecas; 2010–2016	Incumbent
Preceded by Pedro Goytia Robles	Mayor of Zacatecas, Zacatecas; 2001–2004	Succeeded by Gerardo de Jesus Félix Dominguez
