= Sain Alto =

- City & municipal seat
- Location of Sain Alto Sain Alto (Mexico)
- Coordinates: 23°34′52″N 103°14′53″W
- Country: Mexico
- State: Zacatecas
- Municipality: Sain Alto
- Founded: 1555
- Elevation: 2,045 m (6,709 ft)

Population (2020)
  - Total: 5,295
- Area code: 498

Sain Alto is a locality in the Mexican state of Zacatecas. It serves as the municipal seat of the eponymous Sain Alto Municipality.

== Climate ==
Sain Alto has a cold steppe climate. The average annual temperature in the town is 21 °C (70 °F). The warmest month is May, with an average temperature of 29 °C (84 °F), and the coldest is January, at 14 °C (57 °F). Average annual rainfall is 559 mm (22.0 in). The wettest month is September, with an average of 146 mm (5.7 in) of precipitation, and the driest is March, at 1 mm (0.039 in).

== History ==
Sain Alto derives from Zaín or Çayn, a group of Zacateco people who established the settlement of Sain Alto sometime around 1535–1540. These people were led by a cacique named Saín Alonso. The town's full name was originally "San Sebastián con el renombre de Saín", but it eventually became known as San Sebastián de Saín Alto and later simply Sain Alto. The earliest Spanish conquistadors to come into contact with the people of Zaín were Ginés Vázquez de Mercado in 1552 and 1553, and Francisco de Ibarra in September 1554.

With the first Zacatecas state constitution of 1825, Sain Alto became the seat of its own municipality. The latter became a free municipality on 19 August 1916. Mercury mining began in the municipality in 1934, and accounted for 12% of Mexico's mercury production in the years of 1939 and 1940.

== Demographics ==
In the 2020 Mexican Census, Sain Alto recorded a population of 5,295 inhabitants.
