= Sain Alto Municipality =

Sain Alto
- Municipality
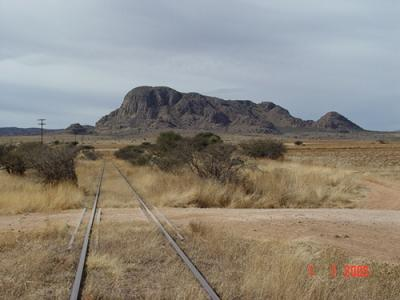
- Cerro de San Nicolas, a hill in the northern part of the municipality of Sain Alto

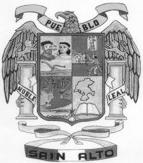
- Coat of arms

- Location of Sain Alto in Mexico
- Coordinates: 23°34′50″N 103°14′55″W
- Country: Mexico
- State: Zacatecas
- Established: 17 January 1825
- Seat: Sain Alto

Government
  - President: José Luis Salas Cordero

Area
  - Total: 1,415.0 km^{2} (546.3 sq mi)
- Elevation (of seat): 2,056 m (6,745 ft)

Population (2020 Census)
  - Total: 21,844
  - Density: 15.437/km^{2} (39.983/sq mi)
  - Seat: 5,295
- Time zone: UTC-6 (Central)
- Postal codes: 99130–99143
- Area code: 498

Sain Alto is a municipality in the Mexican state of Zacatecas, located approximately 110 kilometres (68 mi) northwest of the state capital of Zacatecas City.

== Geography ==
The municipality of Sain Alto is located at an elevation between 1,900 and 3,000 metres (6,200–9,800 ft) on the Mexican Plateau in northwestern Zacatecas. It borders the municipalities of Río Grande to the north, Fresnillo to the south, and Sombrerete to the west. The municipality covers an area of 1,415.0 square kilometres (546.3 sq mi) and comprises 1.9% of the state's area.

As of 2009, the land cover in Sain Alto comprises grassland (51%), forest (23%), and matorral (6%). Another 19% of the land is used for agriculture. The municipality lies in the endorheic basin of the Aguanaval River, which flows south to north through the eastern part of the municipality. A portion of the Sierra Madre Occidental known as the Sierra de Chapultepec runs through the southwestern part of the municipality. The range contains small deposits of mercury and tin, which were exploited between the 1940s and 1970s.

=== Climate ===
Apart from the mountains in the south where the climate is classified as temperate, Sain Alto has a semi-arid climate with dry winters. Average temperatures in the municipality range between 12 and 18 °C (54–64 °F), and average annual precipitation ranges between 400 and 700 millimetres (16–28 in).

Climate data for Sain Alto weather station at 23°34′48″N 103°15′50″W, 2071 m above sea level (1981–2010 averages, 1951–2010 extremes)
Month	Jan	Feb	Mar	Apr	May	Jun	Jul	Aug	Sep	Oct	Nov	Dec	Year
Record high °C (°F)	34.0 (93.2)	33.5 (92.3)	36.0 (96.8)	39.0 (102.2)	39.0 (102.2)	39.0 (102.2)	38.5 (101.3)	37.0 (98.6)	40.0 (104.0)	40.0 (104.0)	36.5 (97.7)	34.0 (93.2)	40.0 (104.0)
Mean daily maximum °C (°F)	21.6 (70.9)	23.1 (73.6)	25.8 (78.4)	28.3 (82.9)	30.3 (86.5)	29.6 (85.3)	27.3 (81.1)	26.7 (80.1)	25.5 (77.9)	24.9 (76.8)	23.8 (74.8)	22.1 (71.8)	25.8 (78.4)
Daily mean °C (°F)	11.1 (52.0)	12.6 (54.7)	15.0 (59.0)	17.6 (63.7)	20.3 (68.5)	21.1 (70.0)	20.0 (68.0)	19.5 (67.1)	18.5 (65.3)	16.3 (61.3)	13.5 (56.3)	11.5 (52.7)	16.4 (61.5)
Mean daily minimum °C (°F)	0.6 (33.1)	2.0 (35.6)	4.2 (39.6)	6.9 (44.4)	10.2 (50.4)	12.7 (54.9)	12.7 (54.9)	12.4 (54.3)	11.4 (52.5)	7.7 (45.9)	3.2 (37.8)	0.9 (33.6)	7.1 (44.8)
Record low °C (°F)	−13.0 (8.6)	−7.5 (18.5)	−6.0 (21.2)	−6.5 (20.3)	2.0 (35.6)	2.0 (35.6)	2.0 (35.6)	0.0 (32.0)	1.0 (33.8)	−4.0 (24.8)	−8.0 (17.6)	−13.0 (8.6)	−13.0 (8.6)
Average precipitation mm (inches)	12.7 (0.50)	9.7 (0.38)	2.4 (0.09)	5.1 (0.20)	20.8 (0.82)	76.2 (3.00)	103.9 (4.09)	110.0 (4.33)	89.4 (3.52)	36.1 (1.42)	11.5 (0.45)	9.0 (0.35)	486.8 (19.17)
Average rainy days (≥ 1 mm)	2.0	1.3	0.6	1.0	3.4	8.3	12.3	12.3	9.9	5.4	1.7	1.5	59.7
Source: Servicio Meteorológico Nacional

== History ==
The name of the municipality derives from the Spanish word Saín, a group of Zacateco people who established the settlement of Sain Alto sometime around 1535–1540. These people were led by a cacique named Saín Alonso. The town's full name was originally "San Sebastián con el renombre de Saín", but it eventually became known as San Sebastián de Sain Alto and later just Sain Alto. The earliest Spanish conquistadors to come into contact with the people of Zaín were Ginés Vázquez de Mercado in 1552 and 1553, and Francisco de Ibarra in September 1554.

The first Zacatecas state constitution of 1825 named Sain Alto as a municipality within the partido of Sombrerete, later the district of Sombrerete. Sain Alto became a free municipality on 19 August 1916. Mercury mining began in the municipality in 1934, and accounted for 12% of Mexico's mercury production in the years of 1939 and 1940.

== Administration ==
The municipal government of Sain Alto comprises a president, a councillor (Spanish: síndico), and thirteen trustees (regidores), eight elected by relative majority and five by proportional representation. The current president of the municipality is José Luis Salas Cordero.

== Demographics ==
In the 2020 INEGI Census, the municipality of Sain Alto recorded a population of 21,844 inhabitants living in 5504 households. The 2010 Census recorded a population of 21,533 inhabitants in Sain Alto.

INEGI lists 53 localities in the municipality, of which only the municipal seat, also called Sain Alto, is classified as urban. It recorded a population of 5295 inhabitants in the 2020 Census.

== Economy and infrastructure ==
The main crops grown in Sain Alto are corn and beans. Livestock ranching is another important agricultural activity, cattle, goats and horses being the commercially most important animals.

Federal Highway 45 runs through the municipality, connecting it to Sombrerete and Durango City in the west, and Fresnillo and Zacatecas City in the southeast. Federal Highway 49 defines the eastern border of the municipality.
