= Alfonso Elías Cardona =

Mexican politician

- Born: 15 January 1941 (age 85); Zacatecas, Mexico
- Education: Autonomous University of Chihuahua
- Occupation: Politician
- Political party: PRD

Alfonso Oliverio Elías Cardona (born 15 January 1941) is a Mexican politician from the Party of the Democratic Revolution (PRD). In the 2000 general election he was elected to the Chamber of Deputies to represent the first district of Zacatecas during the 58th session of Congress.
