= Amalia García =

Mexican politician

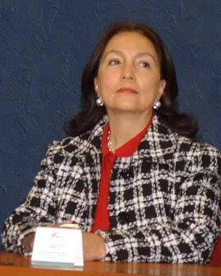

Governor of Zacatecas
- In office September 12, 2004 – September 11, 2010
- Preceded by: Ricardo Monreal
- Succeeded by: Miguel Alonso Reyes

Personal details
- Born: Amalia Dolores García Medina; October 6, 1951 (age 74) Zacatecas, Zacatecas
- Party: Mexican Communist Party (1968–1981); Unified Socialist Party (1981–1987); Mexican Socialist Party (1987–1989); Party of the Democratic Revolution (1989–present)
- Education: Universidad Nacional Autónoma de México
- Occupation: Politician
- Profession: Sociologist

Amalia Dolores García Medina (born October 6, 1951) is a Mexican politician and a former governor of Zacatecas.

== Early life ==
García was born into a political family. When she was five, her father Francisco Garcia Estrada was elected governor of their home state of Zacatecas, representing the Institutional Revolutionary Party (PRI). He held office from 1956 to 1962. Rather than following in his footsteps, García instead enrolled in the outlawed Mexican Communist Party (PCM) after witnessing the student revolts of 1968 and the Tlatelolco massacre.

== Political career ==
García's political stance became more moderate over time, and she played a key role in turning the PCM into a "neo-Communist" party. She followed the PCM into the Unified Socialist Party of Mexico (PSUM) in 1981. After briefly being a member of the Mexican Socialist Party, she became a founding member of the Party of the Democratic Revolution (PRD) when it was created in 1989.

From 1999 to 2002, she served as president of the PRD. In 1996, she ran (unsuccessfully) for party president; she ran again, and won, in 2000.

On June 24, 2018, she renounced PRD, after 29 years of advocacy, arguing "the great debate of ideas that constituted one of its strengths, has been totally replaced by agreements for the distribution of quotas".

== Governor of Zacatecas ==
In 2003, Garcia was selected as the PRD's candidate in the 2004 Zacatecas gubernatorial election. On July 4, 2004, she won a convincing victory and was sworn in as the first female governor of Zacatecas on September 12, 2004. She had been endorsed by a former Governor of Zacatecas, José Guadalupe Cervantes Corona, who renounced his membership in PRI to support Garcia.

She was the fifth woman to serve as governor of a Mexican state. Earlier women governors were Griselda Álvarez (Colima, 1979–1985), Beatriz Paredes (Tlaxcala, 1987–1992), Dulce María Sauri (Yucatán, 1991–1994), Rosario Robles Berlanga (Distrito Federal, 1999–2000).

Preceded by Ricardo Monreal Ávila	Governor of Zacatecas; 2004–2010	Succeeded by Miguel Alonso Reyes
Preceded by Pablo Gómez Álvarez	President of the Party of the Democratic Revolution; 2000–2002	Succeeded by Rosario Robles Berlanga
