= 2004 Chihuahua state election =

Local election in Mexico

The Mexican state of Chihuahua held an election on Sunday, 4 July 2004. At stake was the office of the Chihuahua State Governor, all 33 members of the unicameral Chihuahua State Congress, and 67 mayors and municipal councils.

Turnout was around 46% of the 2,254,234 chihuahuenses eligible to vote.

== Governor ==
At the time of the election, the sitting governor was Patricio Martínez García of the Institutional Revolutionary Party (PRI).

Candidate	Party	Votes	%
José Reyes Baeza	"Alianza con la Gente" (PRI/PVEM/PT)	561,106	56.48%
Javier Corral Jurado	"Todos Somos Chihuahua" (PAN/PRD/CD)	411,162	41.38%
	Nο registered candidates	140	0.01%
	Null votes	21,103	2.12%
Totals		993,511	100.00%

At the close of voting, exit polls were indicating a victory for José Reyes Baeza of a PRI-led alliance with a lead of ten percentage points. As the count progressed, Javier Corral Jurado of the PAN – representing an unusual alliance of his party and the left-leaning PRD – conceded the election at around 23h00 local time.

== State congress ==
- 22 First-past-the-post deputies:
  - 17 for "Alianza con la Gente" (PRI, PVEM, PT)
  - 5 for "Todos Somos Chihuahua" (PAN, PRD, CD)
- 11 Proportional representation deputies:
  - 3 for "Alianza con la Gente" (PRI, PVEM, PT)
  - 8 for "Todos Somos Chihuahua" (PAN, PRD, CD)

== Municipalities ==
Preliminary results indicated the state's 67 municipalities would be divided as follows:

- 44: PRI (in alliance with PVEM and PT)
- 21: PAN (in alliance with PRD and CD)
- 1: PRD
- 1: PVEM (Manuel Benavides municipality)

The PAN/PRD alliance won a closely fought mayoral race in state capital Chihuahua, previously governed by the PRI. In a give-and-take action between the state's two largest cities, borderland industrial and commercial powerhouse Ciudad Juárez fell to the PRI after 12 years of PAN rule.

== On the same day ==
- 2004 Durango state election
- 2004 Zacatecas state election

== See also ==
- Politics of Mexico
- List of political parties in Mexico
