= Jiménez del Teul =

Human settlement in Mexico

Coordinates: 23°15′N 103°48′W

- Municipality
- Location in Mexico Jiménez del Teul (Mexico)
- Country: Mexico
- State: Zacatecas
- Demonym: (in Spanish)
- Time zone: UTC−6 (CST)

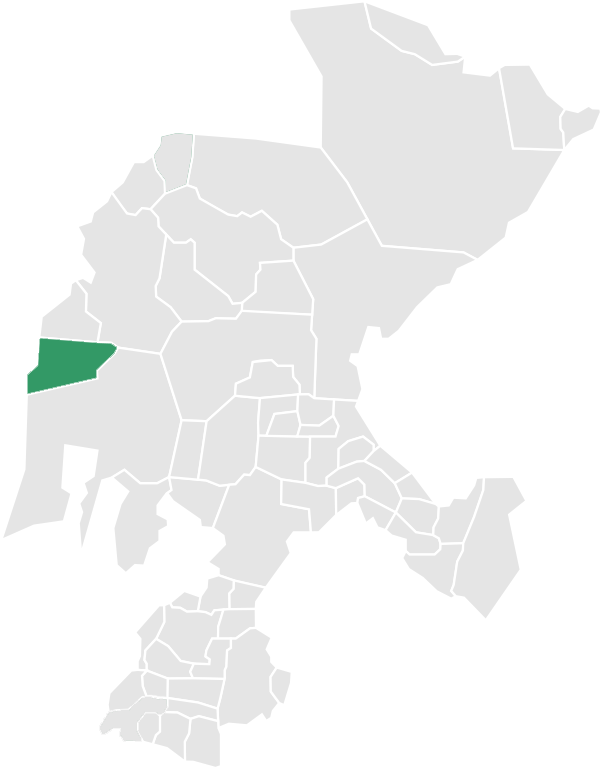

Jiménez del Teul is the seat of the municipality of the same name in the Mexican state of Zacatecas. One of the oldest towns in Mexico, Jiménez del Teul was founded in 1591.
