= 2004 Durango state election =

Local election in Mexico

The Mexican state of Durango held an election on Sunday, July 4, 2004. At stake was the office of the Durango State Governor, all 25 members of the unicameral Durango State Congress, and 39 mayors and municipal councils.

Turnout was 49.7% of the 977,699 duranguenses eligible to vote.

== Governor ==
At the time of the election, the sitting governor was Ángel Sergio Guerrero Mier of the Institutional Revolutionary Party (PRI). No party other than the PRI has ever governed Durango.

Candidate	Party	Votes	%
Ismael Hernández	PRI		52%
Andrés Galván R.	PAN		31%
Jorge Campos Murillo	"Todos por Durango" (PRD, PT, CD)		10%
Lucy Ramírez	Partido Duranguense		2.86%
??	PVEM		0.49%
Write-in candidates			0.24%
Invalid votes			2.74%
Totals			

With 90% of the results counted, Ismael Hernández of the PRI was set for victory with around 52% of the votes cast. Andrés Galván of the PAN was in second place with about 30%.

The new governor of Durango was sworn in on 15 September 2004.

== On the same day ==
- 2004 Chihuahua state election
- 2004 Zacatecas state election

== See also ==
- Politics of Mexico
- List of political parties in Mexico
