= Ricardo Monreal =

Mexican politician

Ricardo Monreal Ávila
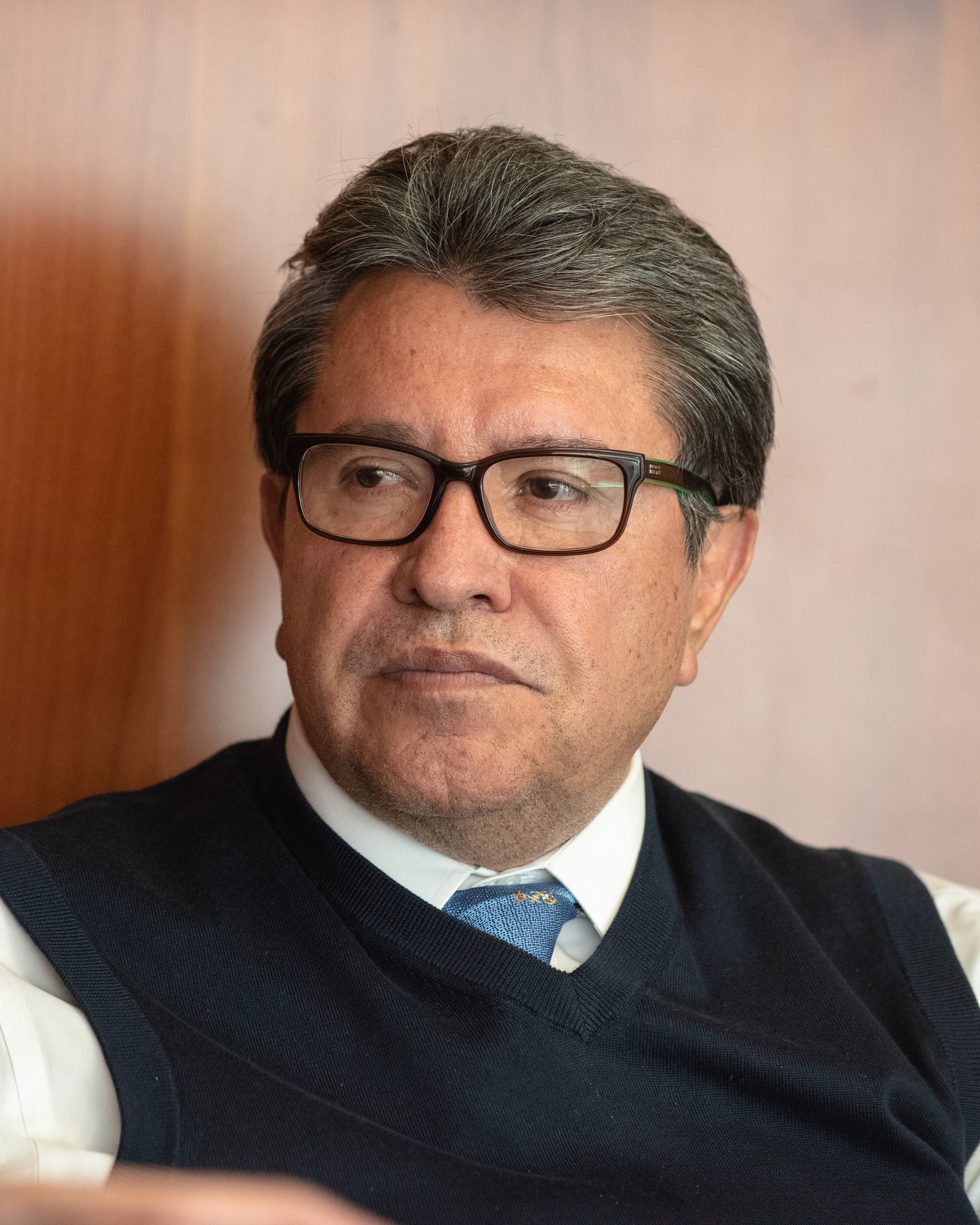

Governor of Zacatecas
- In office 12 September 1998 – 11 September 2004
- Preceded by: Arturo Romo Gutiérrez
- Succeeded by: Amalia García

President of the Chamber of Deputies
- In office 15 April 1991 – 14 May 1991
- Preceded by: Fernando Córdoba Lobo
- Succeeded by: María Claudia Esqueda Llanes

Member of the Chamber of Deputies for the 3rd district of Zacatecas
- In office 1 September 1997 – 3 September 1998
- Preceded by: Gustavo Salinas Íñiguez
- Succeeded by: María Martha Veyna Soriano

Member of the Chamber of Deputies for the 2nd district of Zacatecas
- In office 1 September 1988 – 31 October 1991
- Preceded by: Pedro Goytía Robles
- Succeeded by: José Eulogio Bonilla

Personal details
- Born: 19 September 1960 (age 66) Fresnillo, Zacatecas, Mexico
- Party: National Regeneration Movement (2015–present)
- Other political affiliations: Institutional Revolutionary Party (1975–1998); Party of the Democratic Revolution (1998–2008); Labor Party (2008–2012); Citizens' Movement (2012–2015)
- Relatives: David Monreal Ávila (brother); Saúl Monreal Ávila (brother); Susana Monreal Ávila (sister)
- Education: Autonomous University of Zacatecas (BA) National Autonomous University of Mexico (JD)
- Occupation: Politician
- Profession: Lawyer

Ricardo Monreal Ávila (born 19 September 1960) is a Mexican politician affiliated with the National Regeneration Movement (Morena). He currently serves as a Deputy in the Mexican Congress, representing a Proportional Representation seat since September 1, 2024. He is also the President of the Political Coordination Board in the Chamber of Deputies. Previously, he was a senator and the Senate Majority Leader, a former Governor of Zacatecas and a former member of the Institutional Revolutionary Party (PRI) (and of the Party of the Democratic Revolution PRD) being closely identified during his tenure in that party with former president Carlos Salinas de Gortari.

Monreal Ávila graduated with a bachelor's degree in law from the Autonomous University of Zacatecas (UAZ) and with a Ph.D. in administrative and constitutional law from the National Autonomous University of Mexico (UNAM). He worked as a professor of law for several years and got involved in several agricultural programs and farmers' organizations during most of the 1980s.

In 1991 he became president of the state chapter of the Revolutionary Institutional Party, a political institution he represented twice at the Chamber of Deputies, once at the local congress and twice at the Senate. In 1998, after losing the PRI nomination for governor of Zacatecas, he switched sides and joined the left-of-center Party of the Democratic Revolution, winning the election with 44.6% of the votes. He billed his victory as "the second taking of Zacatecas."

Monreal left the governorship in September 2004 and briefly considered to compete for the 2006 PRD presidential candidacy. Instead, he joined the presidential campaign of Andrés Manuel López Obrador, the former Head of Government of the Federal District. In the general election of 2 July 2006, he was elected to the Senate for the PRD as a national-list PR senator.

On 11 July 2018, after the landslide victory of the National Regeneration Movement during the 2018 Mexican general election, he was named President of MORENA in the Senate.

Preceded by Arturo Romo	Governor of Zacatecas; 1998–2004	Succeeded by Amalia García
