= Governor of Zacatecas =

Chief executive of the Mexican state of Zacatecas

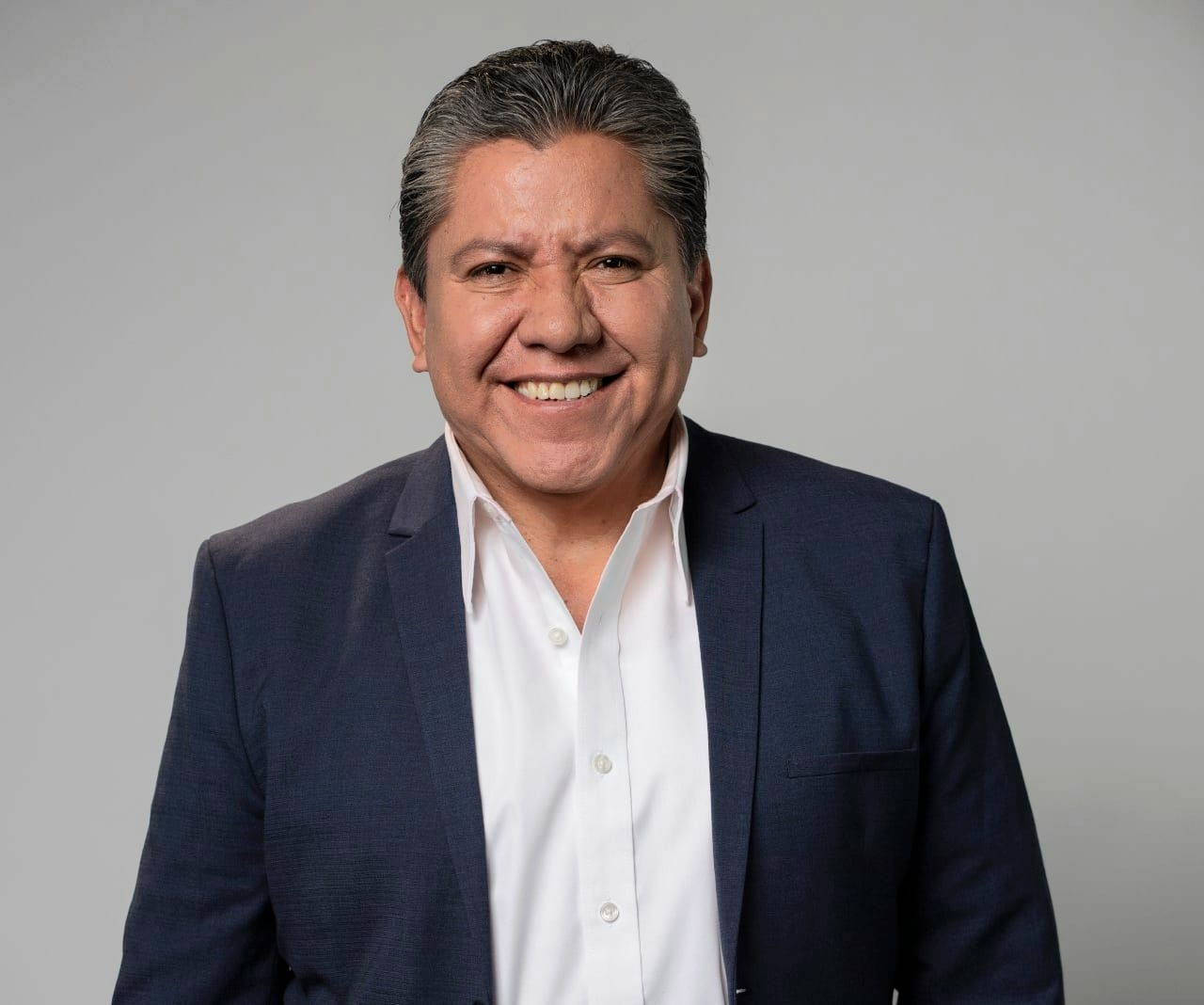
- Incumbent; David Monreal Ávila since September 12, 2021
- Term length: Six years (Just for this time, the term will be of five years), non-renewable.
- Inaugural holder: José María García Rojas
- Formation: 1825

The governor of Zacatecas (Spanish: Gobernador Constitucional del Estado de Zacatecas) wields executive power in the State of Zacatecas. The governor is directly elected by the citizens, using secret ballot, to a six-year term with no possibility of reelection.

The current governor of Zacatecas is David Monreal Ávila, a member of the National Regeneration Movement (MORENA), since 2021.

== Governors ==
Governors of Zacatecas
Governor	Term in office	Party	Election
Donato Moreno Muro	16 September 1920 – 26 November 1923		1920
Ezequiel Salcedo	27 November 1923 – 7 April 1924		Interim
José T. Delgado	8 April 1924 – 9 August 1924		Interim
Aureliano Castañeda	16 September 1924 – 19 December 1925		1924
Pedro Belauzarán	20 December 1925 – 2 April 1926		Interim
Fernando Rodarte	1 May 1926 – 15 March 1928		Interim
Francisco Bañuelos	16 March 1928 – 1 September 1928		Interim
Alfonso Medina Castañeda	16 September 1928 – 28 May 1929		1928
J. Jesús Delgado	29 May 1929 – 31 December 1929		Interim
Luis R. Reyes	1 January 1930 – 31 January 1932		Interim
Leobardo C. Ruiz	1 February 1932 – 15 September 1932		Interim
Matías Ramos (1891–1962)	16 September 1932 – 15 September 1936	PNR	1932
J. Félix Bañuelos (1878–1948)	16 September 1936 – 15 September 1940	PNR	1936
Pánfilo Natera García (1882–1951)	16 September 1940 – 15 September 1944	PRM	1940
Leobardo Reynoso (1902–1993)	16 September 1944 – 15 September 1950	PRM	1944
José Minero Roque (1907–1978)	16 September 1950 – 15 September 1956	PRI	1950
Francisco E. García (1920–2004)	16 September 1956 – 15 September 1962	PRI	1956
José Rodríguez Elías (1916–1994)	16 September 1962 – 15 September 1968	PRI	1962
Pedro Ruiz González (1928–1975)	16 September 1968 – 15 September 1974	PRI	1968
Fernando Pámanes Escobedo (1909–2005)	16 September 1974 – 15 September 1980	PRI	1974
José Guadalupe Cervantes Corona (1924–2013)	16 September 1980 – 15 September 1986	PRI	1980
Genaro Borrego Estrada (b. 1949)	16 September 1986 – 14 May 1992	PRI	1986
Pedro de León (b. 1945)	14 May 1992 – 11 September 1992	PRI	Interim
Arturo Romo Gutiérrez (b. 1942)	12 September 1992 – 11 September 1998	PRI	1992
Ricardo Monreal Ávila (b. 1960)	12 September 1998 – 11 September 2004	PRD	1998
Amalia García (b. 1951)	12 September 2004 – 11 September 2010	PRD	2004
Miguel Alonso Reyes (b. 1971)	12 September 2010 – 11 September 2016	PRI	2010
Alejandro Tello Cristerna (b. 1962)	12 September 2016 – 11 September 2021	PRI	2016
David Monreal Ávila (b. 1966)	12 September 2021 – Incumbent	Morena	2021

== See also ==
- List of Mexican state governors
