= Autonomous University of Zacatecas =

Public research university in Mexico

- Universidad Autónoma de Zacatecas
- Official Seal
- Former names: Instituto de Ciencias Autónomo de Zacatecas (Autonomous Institute of Sciences of Zacatecas, 1959)
- Type: Public university
- Established: 10 October 1959
- Academic affiliations: ANUIES
- Rector: Rubén Ibarra Reyes
- Location: Zacatecas, Zacatecas, Mexico; 22.7730°N 102.5751°W
- Campus: Several across the state; mostly urban.
- Colors: White, blue and gold
- Nickname: Tuzos
- Mascot: Gopher
- Website: www.uaz.edu.mx

The Universidad Autónoma de Zacatecas (UAZ) (Autonomous University of Zacatecas) is a Mexican public research university based in the city of Zacatecas, Zacatecas, but with several campuses across the state. It is considered both the most prestigious and most important college in the state. According to Mexican business and economics newspaper El Economista the UAZ is among the 20 best Mexican universities.

== Administration and organization ==
UAZ is organized in academic areas, subdivided in academic unities.. The following are the academic areas the university us divided into: Academic Area of Art and Culture, Academic Area of Basic Sciences, Academic Area of Health Sciences, Academic Area of Engineering, Academic Area of Humanities and Education, Academic Area of Social, Economic and Administrative Sciences and Academic Area of Agricultural Sciences. These organizational sets are further divided into academic unities.

=== Staff and labor Unions ===
Most of the staff is unionized under the "Sindicato de los Trabajadores de la Universidad Autónoma de Zacatecas" (Autonomous University of Zacatecas' Workers Union). In addition to this, most of the academia affiliates with the "SPAUAZ" (Autonomous University of Zacatecas Academic Personal Union). UAZ, since its beginnings, has had a history of conflicted and prolonged labor negotiations with each, or both, of these unions, often culminating in strikes

== Campus ==
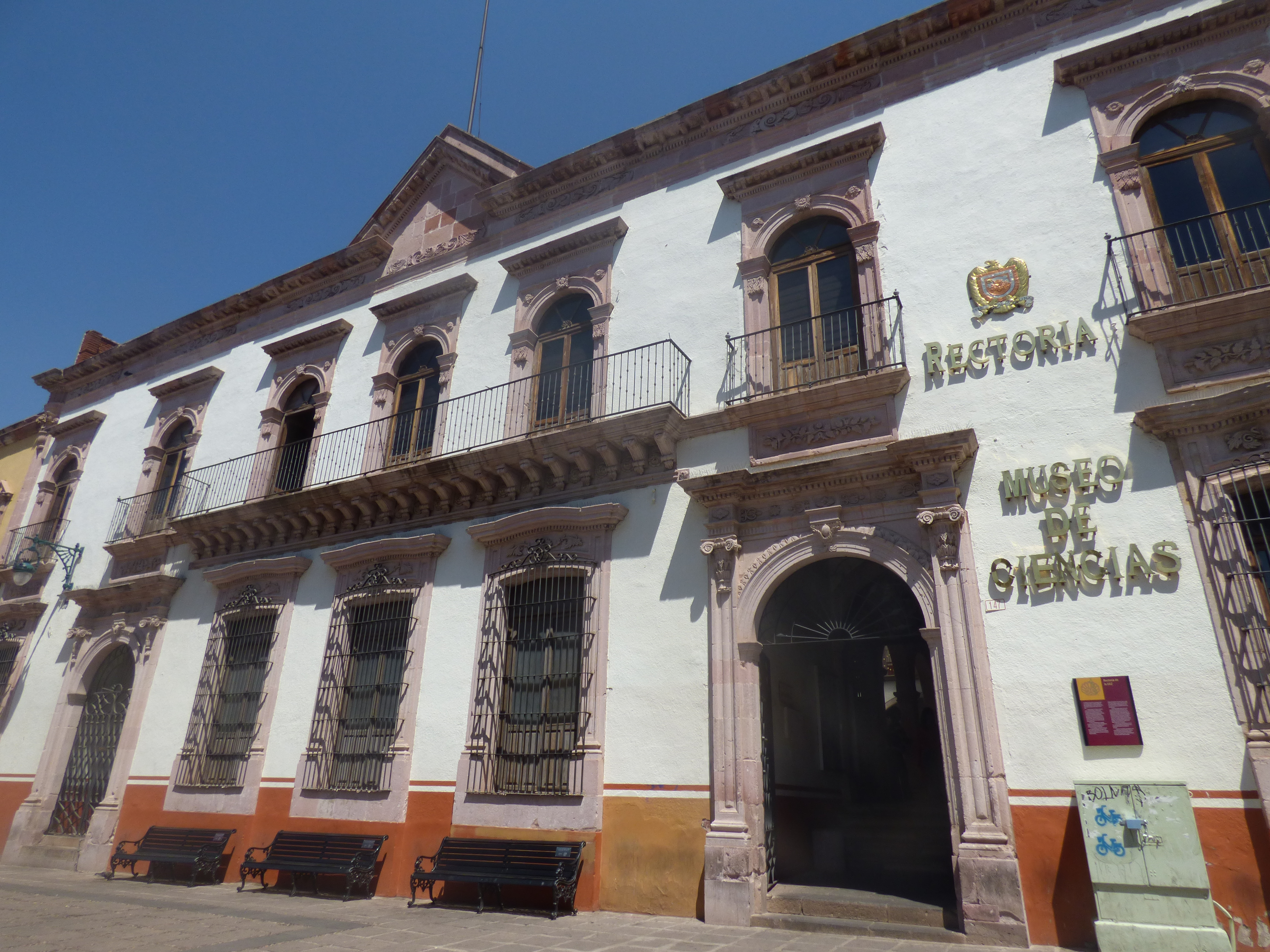
Rectorship buildings.

"Ciudad Universitaria Campus Siglo XXI" is the university main campus, it's located in the outskirts of the city of Zacatecas

== Campus life ==
UAZ is a small-sized research university, most of whose students are in the undergraduate and professional schools. Most of the students are native to the state, but an important minority comes from different parts of the Mexican federation. There also exists a small percent of foreigner attendees.

=== Political activism ===
UAZ students and professors often engage in political and social activism and its members have a long tradition in doing so. Because of this UAZ has been an important figure in the State's policy making decision since its foundation.

== Noted alumni ==
Being the most important university in Zacatecas, many prominent figures in the economical, political, scientific, and artistic life of the state and Mexico are UAZ alumni or faculty.

- Benjamín Medrano Quezada, municipal president of Fresnillo, Zacatecas
- Rocío Nahle García, Secretary of Energy during Andrés Manuel López Obrador presidency, and Governor of Veracruz
