= Fresnillo =

City in the Mexican state of Zacatecas

Fresnillo, Zacatecas
- City
- Fresnillo de González Echeverría
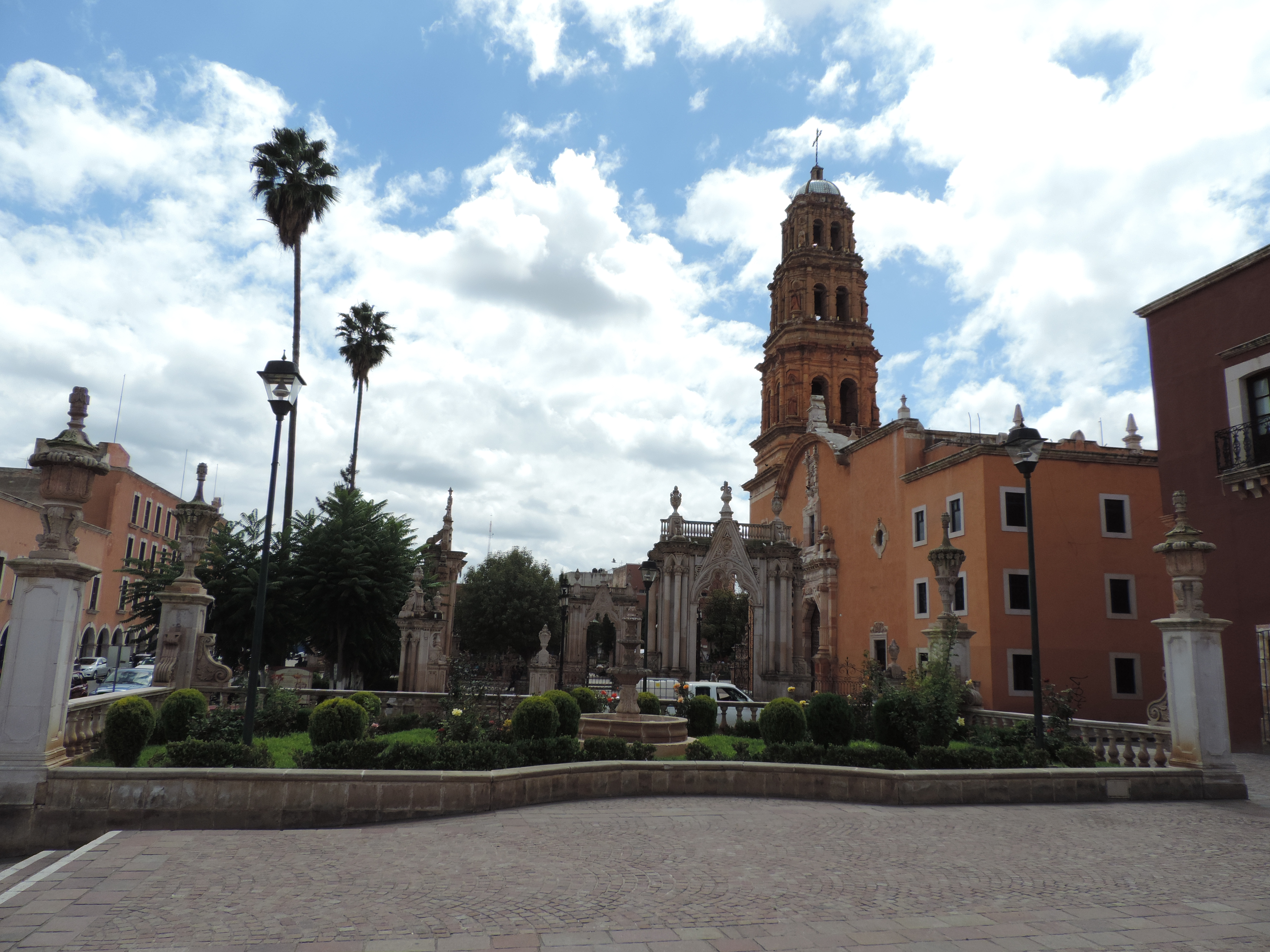
- Templo de la Purificación in Fresnillo

- Location within Zacatecas Location within Mexico
- Coordinates: 23°10′30″N 102°52′03″W
- Country: Mexico
- State: Zacatecas
- Founded: September 2, 1554

Government
  - Mayor: Saul Monreal
  - Federal electoral district: Zacatecas's 1st

Area
  - Municipality: 4,900 km^{2} (1,910 sq mi)
- Elevation: 2,210 m (7,250 ft)

Population (2020)
  - Total: 143,281
  - Density: 4,712/km^{2} (12,200/sq mi)
  - Municipality: 240,532
  - Demonym: Fresnillense
- Time zone: UTC–06:00 (Zona Centro)
- Postal code: 99000
- Area code: 493
- Website: fresnillo.gob.mx

Fresnillo (Spanish pronunciation: [fres'nijo]) is a city in north central Mexico, founded in 1554 by Francisco de Ibarra. It is the second largest city in the state of Zacatecas and the seat of Fresnillo municipality. As a rail and highway junction, Fresnillo is the center of a rich mining area known especially for silver, and the location of one of the world's richest silver mines, the Mina Proaño or Fresnillo Mine, which belongs to the Peñoles mining company. Other important economic activities include agriculture (cereals, beans), cattle raising, and a mining school. Fresnillo is also the municipal seat of the municipality of the same name which surrounds it. The municipality had a population of 196,538 and an areal extent of 4,947 square kilometres (1,910 sq mi).

It is the location of religious pilgrimages to see the famous Santo Niño de Atocha ("Holy Child of Atocha"), a Roman Catholic devotional statue brought to Mexico from Spain.

== History ==
Between 1551 and 1552, Diego Fernández de Proaño embarked on several explorations in the Zacatecas region, searching for a legendary hill purported to contain great mineral wealth. He discovered a hill, which despite not matching the descriptions given, bore evidence of rich mineral deposits, which he named "Cerro de Proaño" ("Proaño's Hill"). He returned to the city of Zacatecas to report his findings to the Viceroy, but apparently there was not much interest in his discovery and Proaño's Hill was forgotten over the years.

A second expedition, headed by 15-year-old Francisco de Ibarra, arrived on September 2, 1554 at a place where there was a freshwater spring, in whose border was a "Pequeño Fresno" (small ash). They decided to spend the night, and Francisco de Ibarra wrote his name for the place in his daily journal: "Ojo de Agua del Fresnillo" ("spring of the small ash").

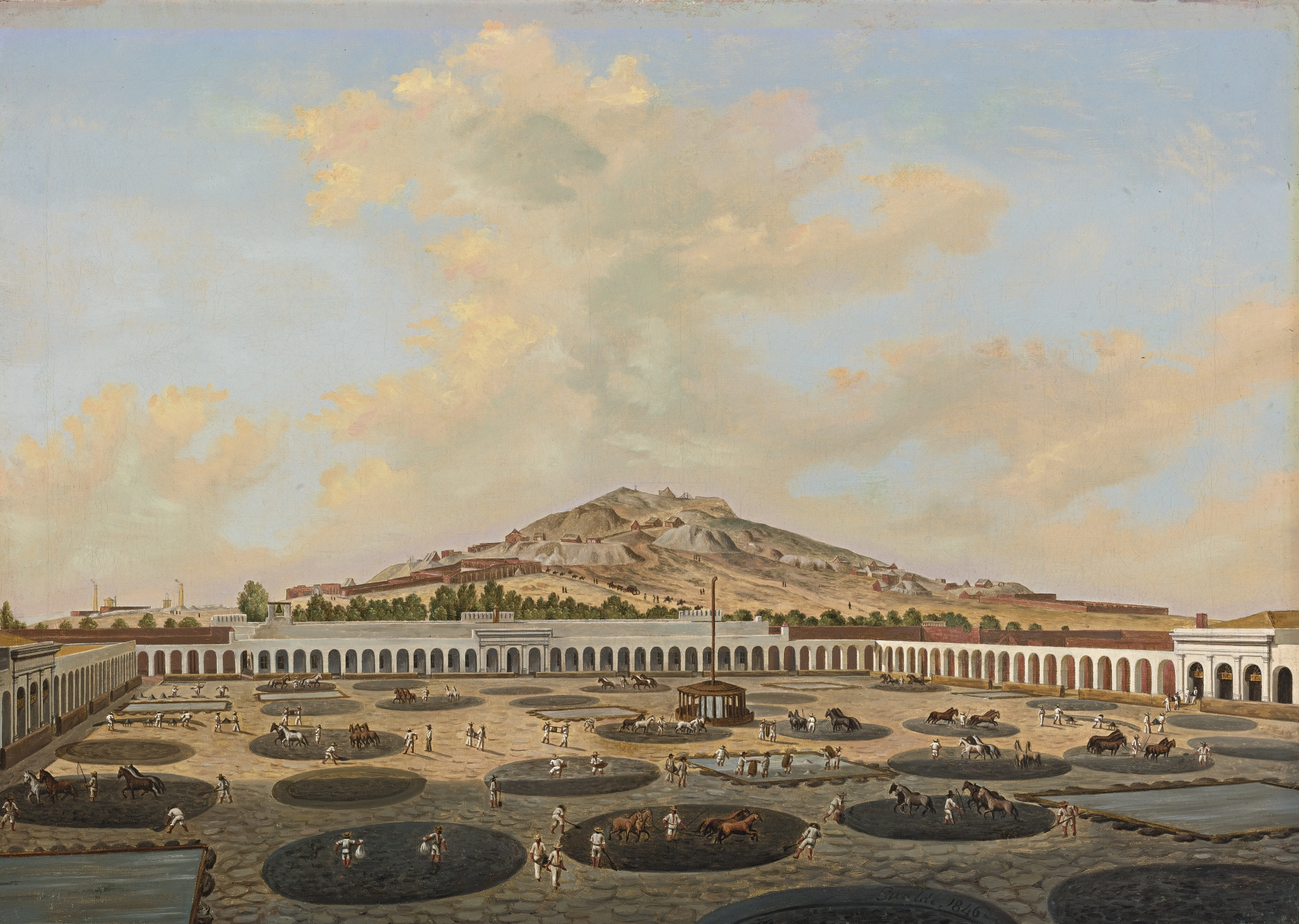
Estate Proaño

In the early years after its foundation, the town suffered incursions by Guachichil Indians who were nomadic and bellicose. Due to the heavy losses suffered by the settlers in those early years, the Viceroy, Martín Enríquez de Almanza, ordered the construction of a presidio in the town. Captain Rodrigo Río de Loza was assigned to lead the garrison of eight soldiers. The military outpost was built where the current municipal palace stands today. Among the first mayors of Fresnillo were Captain Diego Núñez de Miranda, Cristóbal Caldera and Juan de Avellaneda.

Between 1682 and 1757, the mines were worked constantly. There were several mines, mostly on the foothills of Proaño's Hill. In 1757, the mine shafts had reached fifty meters in depth and flooding began to be a major problem. The mines were abandoned as it was economically unviable to mitigate the flooding and the area went into an economic crisis. The mine owners lost their mines as a result of seizure by the Spanish Crown for failure to repay loans. The Crown named a new administrator for the mines, but they continued to lie idle.

In 2013, Fresnillo became the first municipality in Mexican history to elect an openly gay mayor, with the election of Benjamín Medrano. The municipal palace was burned during a protest against the kidnapping, torture, and murder of a 12-year-old girl known as Sofía Alejandra N. on November 22, 2020. The girl was kidnapped and held for eleven days but the family could not come up with the money needed to pay the ransom.

In the summer of 2021, it was reported that 96% of the residents of Fresnillo felt unsafe, primarily due to the violence from drug cartels.

== Geography ==
=== Climate ===
Climate data for Fresnillo
Month	Jan	Feb	Mar	Apr	May	Jun	Jul	Aug	Sep	Oct	Nov	Dec	Year
Record high °C (°F)	31.0 (87.8)	30.0 (86.0)	33.0 (91.4)	39.0 (102.2)	38.0 (100.4)	38.5 (101.3)	34.0 (93.2)	34.0 (93.2)	33.0 (91.4)	33.0 (91.4)	31.0 (87.8)	29.0 (84.2)	39.0 (102.2)
Mean daily maximum °C (°F)	19.9 (67.8)	21.9 (71.4)	24.7 (76.5)	26.8 (80.2)	29.4 (84.9)	28.5 (83.3)	26.0 (78.8)	25.5 (77.9)	24.7 (76.5)	24.4 (75.9)	22.7 (72.9)	20.4 (68.7)	24.6 (76.3)
Daily mean °C (°F)	12.1 (53.8)	13.5 (56.3)	16.2 (61.2)	18.3 (64.9)	21.1 (70.0)	21.2 (70.2)	19.6 (67.3)	19.3 (66.7)	18.5 (65.3)	17.2 (63.0)	14.8 (58.6)	12.8 (55.0)	17.1 (62.8)
Mean daily minimum °C (°F)	4.3 (39.7)	5.1 (41.2)	7.6 (45.7)	9.8 (49.6)	12.9 (55.2)	13.9 (57.0)	13.1 (55.6)	13.0 (55.4)	12.3 (54.1)	10.1 (50.2)	6.9 (44.4)	5.1 (41.2)	9.5 (49.1)
Record low °C (°F)	−5.5 (22.1)	−7.0 (19.4)	−2.0 (28.4)	0.0 (32.0)	4.0 (39.2)	4.5 (40.1)	7.0 (44.6)	7.0 (44.6)	4.0 (39.2)	1.0 (33.8)	−3.0 (26.6)	−10.5 (13.1)	−10.5 (13.1)
Average precipitation mm (inches)	15.6 (0.61)	5.2 (0.20)	1.2 (0.05)	3.4 (0.13)	17.4 (0.69)	74.5 (2.93)	87.0 (3.43)	96.5 (3.80)	60.6 (2.39)	32.9 (1.30)	12.4 (0.49)	12.3 (0.48)	419.0 (16.50)
Average precipitation days (≥ 0.1 mm)	2.4	1.0	0.8	1.0	3.6	8.8	10.7	11.9	9.2	5.2	2.0	2.7	59.3
Source: Servicio Meteorologico Nacional

== The Coat of Arms of Fresnillo ==
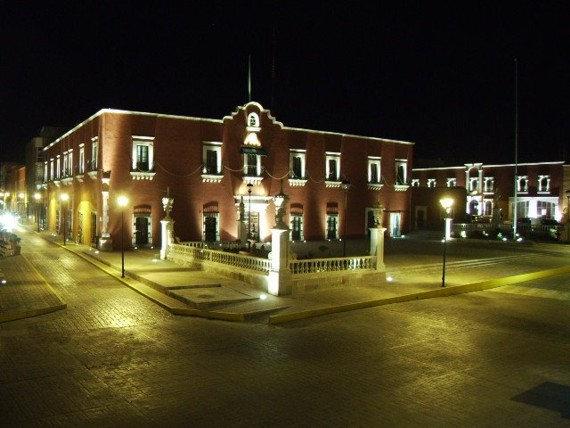
Fresnillo municipal palace

In the superior part of the shield is the Latin phrase: "Orat Atque Laborat Ab Urbe Condita", which means: "Since its Founding a City that Works and Prays". The lower part reads, "Real de Minas del Fresnillo (Royal Mine of Fresnillo)". In the center the horizontal bar reads: "2 de Septiembre de 1554".

The coat of arms is divided into three boxes: first in the left superior part, there appears the Virgin of Candlemas, Pattern of Fresnillo, which is identified by the candle in her right hand. In the box on the right superior part, there is a rodela or shield and the arms used by the natives and the Spaniards during the Conquest. In the inferior part (the third box) there appears a spring, in whose margin there is an Ash tree, and a depiction of the bottom of the Proaño Hill with some clouds, symbolizing the rainy month of September. "2 of September of 1554".

== Plateros ==
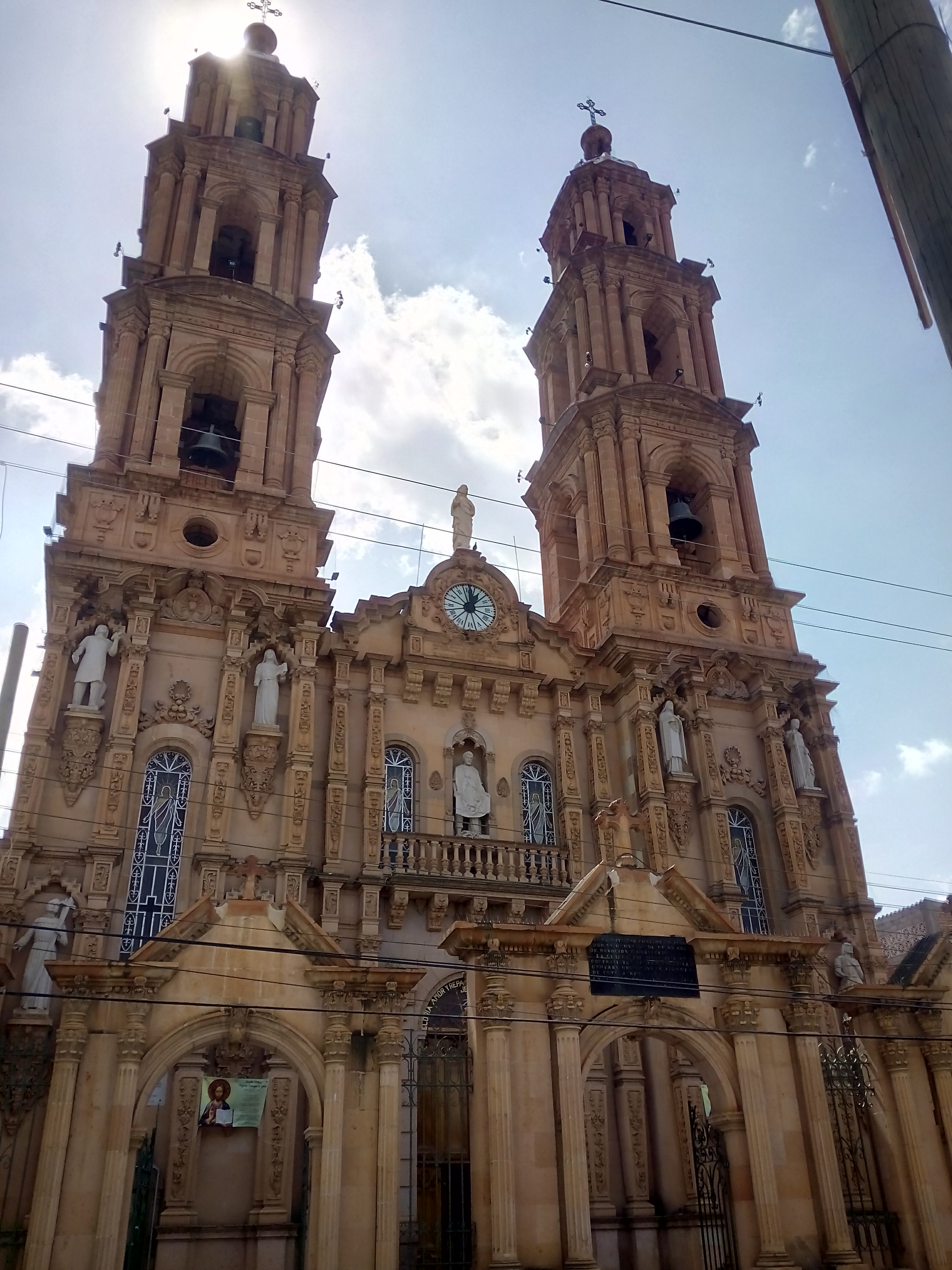
Parish of Sacred heart of Jesus

Fresnillo, Zacatecas is often connected with Plateros, a nearby mining town that attracts many religious believers to the area. The church was built in the late 1690s in commemoration of Spanish miners finding a miraculous silver crucifix. The crucifix is said to have appeared in a wooden crate without knowledge of its creation. Spiritual devotion and respect resulted in the cross-Atlantic travel of a statue of the Our Lady of Atocha. The statue has the Virgin Mary carrying an infant Jesus in her arms. This infant statue became known as the Holy Child of Atocha.

Many claim that miracles result from the devout prayer to this Holy Child. Those who truly believe that the Holy Child worked in their favor will often bring back a gift in gratitude. In 1883, a separate building was constructed to house the various gifts followers brought back to him.

Today, many families who have religious connections to this saint will travel far in pilgrimage and attend mass as they visit the shrine. The saint itself is said to be a Zacatecas iconic piece, as well as a guardian of miners.

== Agriculture ==
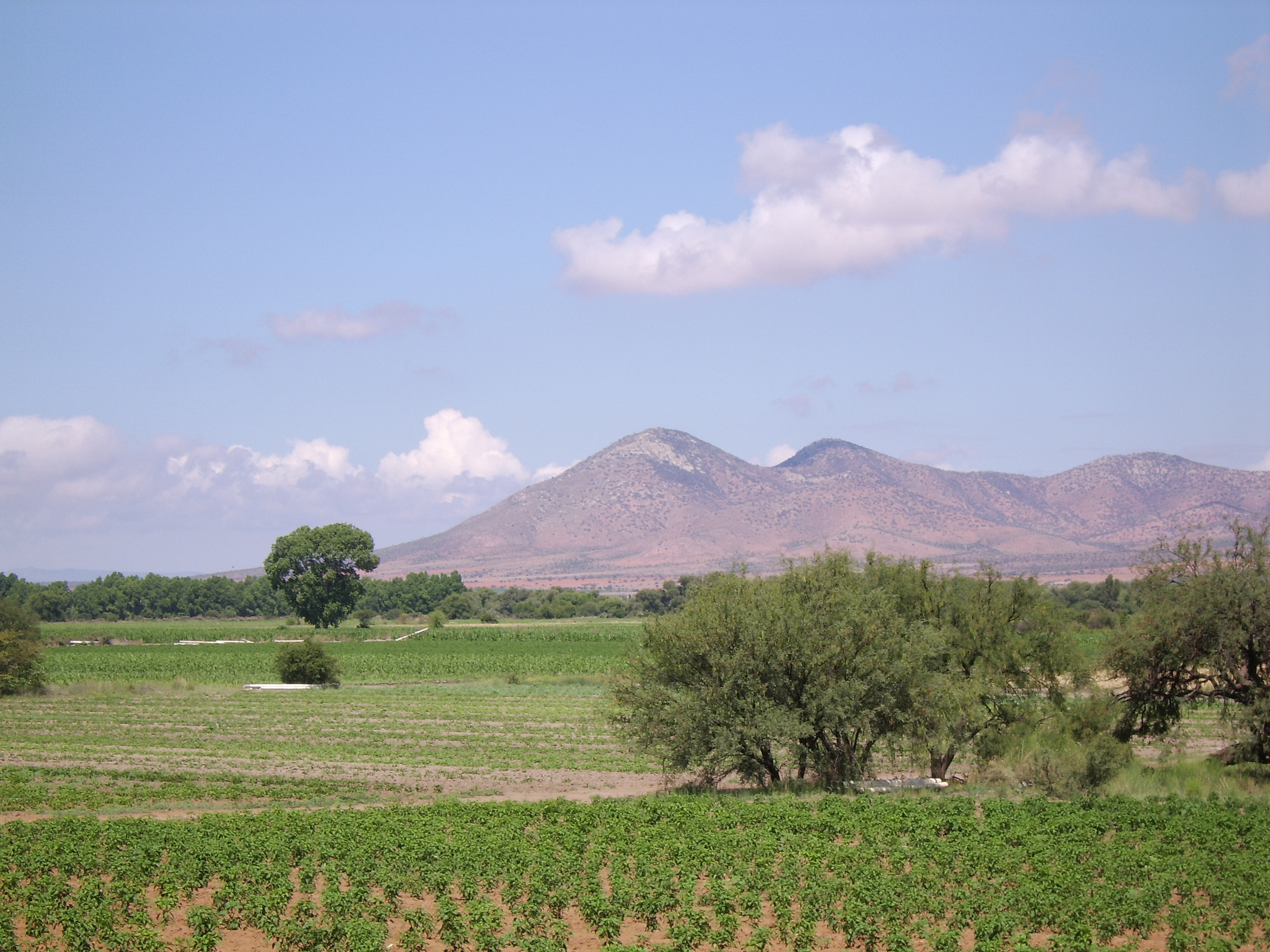
Agriculture in Fresnillo, Zacatecas

Agriculture is of great importance. The city is a great producer of various crops, including corn, pepper, tomato, among others. The neighboring towns and villages will focus on exporting its goods to the main city, as well as others. Economic sustainability is often connected to its agricultural success, along with silver mining.
