= 1988 Mexican general election =

- 6 July 1988
- Presidential election
- Turnout: 52.01% (▼22.83pp)
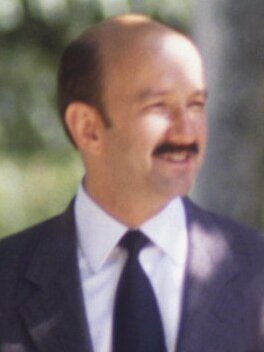

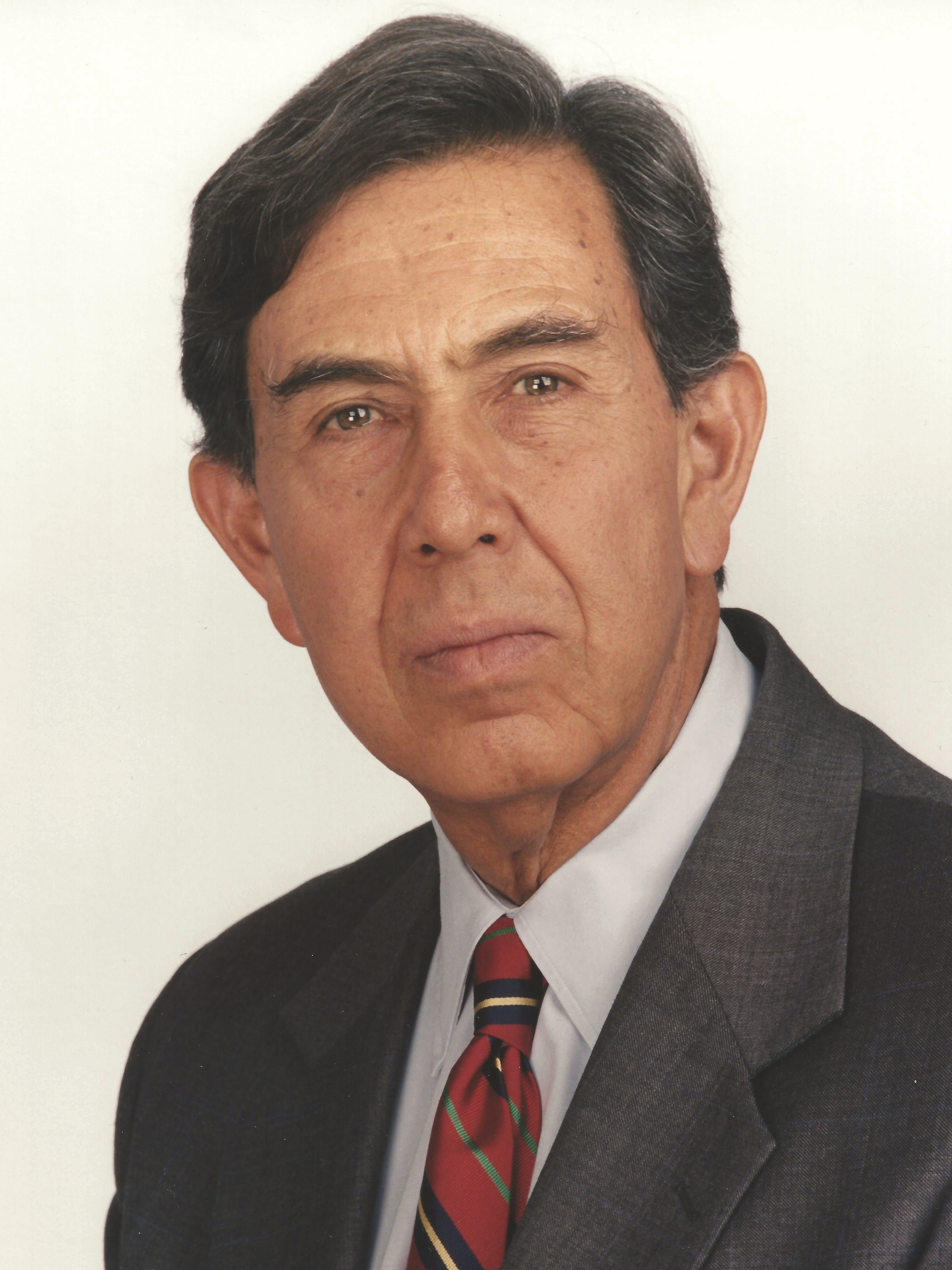

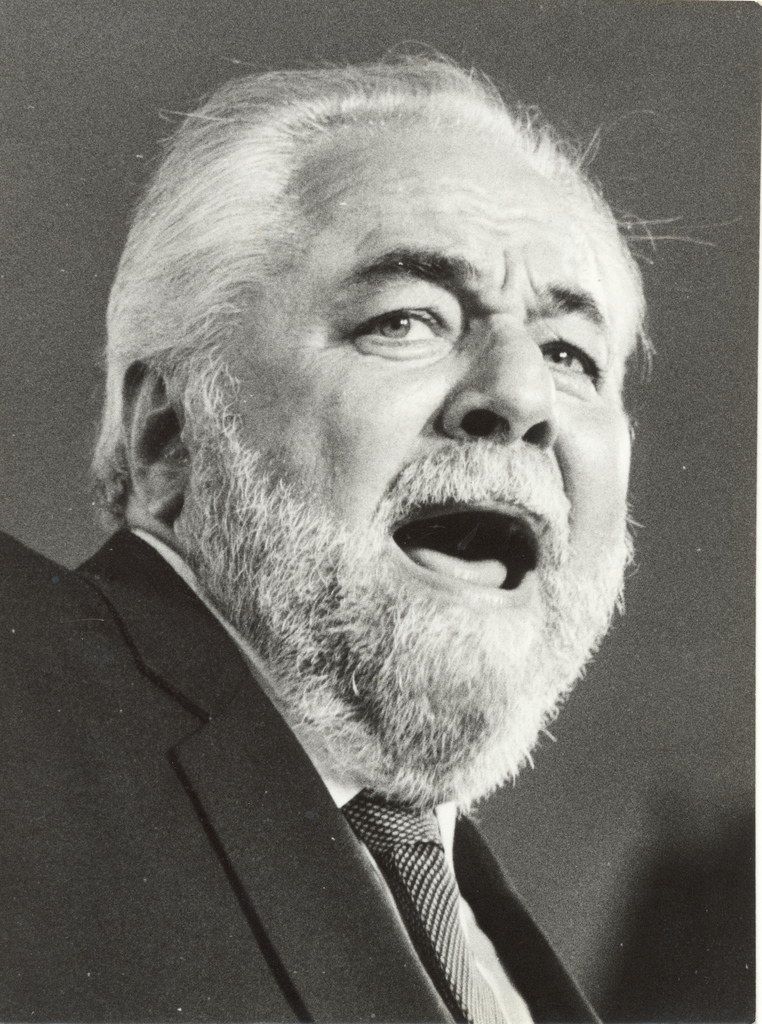
Nominee	Carlos Salinas de Gortari	Cuauhtémoc Cárdenas	Manuel Clouthier
Party	PRI	FDN	PAN
Popular vote	9,687,926	5,929,585	3,208,584
Percentage	50.71%	31.03%	16.79%
- Results by state
President before election
Miguel de la Madrid
PRI
Elected President
Carlos Salinas de Gortari
PRI
- Senate
- All 64 seats in the Senate of the Republic; 33 seats needed for a majority
Party	Leader	Vote %	Seats	+/–
PRI	Jorge de la Vega Domínguez	50.83	60	−3
PMS	Heberto Castillo	4.23	4	+4
This lists parties that won seats. See the complete results below.
- Chamber of Deputies
- All 500 seats in the Chamber of Deputies; 251 seats needed for a majority
Party	Leader	Vote %	Seats	+/–
PRI	Jorge de la Vega Domínguez	50.97	260	−32
PAN	Luis H. Álvarez	18.00	101	+63
PFCRN	Rafael Aguilar Talamantes	9.20	49	+38
PPS	Jorge Cruickshank García	4.33	23	−15
PARM	Carlos Cantú Rosas	6.18	30	+19
PMS	Heberto Castillo	4.45	24	+6
This lists parties that won seats. See the complete results below.

General elections were held in Mexico on 6 July 1988. They were the first competitive presidential elections in Mexico since the Institutional Revolutionary Party (PRI) took power in 1929. The elections were widely considered to have been fraudulent, with the PRI resorting to electoral tampering to remain in power.

PRI candidate Carlos Salinas de Gortari was proclaimed the winner of the presidential election, with the Secretariat of Interior reporting he received 51% of the vote. It was the lowest for a winning candidate since direct presidential elections were inaugurated in 1917; in all previous presidential elections, the PRI faced no serious opposition and won with well over 70% of the vote. In the Chamber of Deputies election, the PRI won 260 of the 500 seats, as well as winning 60 of the 64 seats in the Senate election.

Although early results from the parallel vote tabulation indicated that Cuauhtémoc Cárdenas was leading, when the official results were published, Salinas de Gortari was claimed to have won by a large margin. All of the opposition candidates decried the rigged elections, and there were numerous rallies across the country, including those by opposition lawmakers in Congress. However, Salinas de Gortari was allowed to take office as President on December 1 after the PRI-dominated Congress ruled his election legitimate.

== Background ==
The Federal Law of Political Organizations and Electoral Processes (LFOPPE), which resulted from the political reform of 1977, was in effect for the previous legislative elections in 1985, which saw the full renewal of the Chamber of Deputies. The Institutional Revolutionary Party (PRI) won 292 seats, the National Action Party (PAN) 38, while five parties won 11–12 seats and a further two parties won six seats each. The PRI had a supermajority of around 72% of the Deputies in the Chamber of the LIII Legislature.

=== Miguel de la Madrid presidency (1982–1988) ===
In the 1982 general elections the PRI, along with the Popular Socialist Party (PPS) and the Authentic Party of the Mexican Revolution (PARM), had received 71% of the vote. Once in office, President Miguel de la Madrid implemented a "severe austerity program" that included cuts to public services and social spending. The decline in oil prices in 1985, compounded by the September 19 earthquake of the same year; destroyed the economic stabilization that had resulted from the government's response to the debt crisis at the beginning of the decade.The earthquake's political ramifications included the need for the country to collaborate together for rescue and reconstruction efforts in the face of government inaction, resulting in "civil associationism." In 1987, inflation reached a high of 159%. The situation caused the price of bread to increase by 1800%, beans by 800%, and tortillas by 400%.

In this period, the external public debt went from 6 billion dollars to 84 billion. The government's "adoption of neoliberal policy and the consolidation [in power] [...] of a group of technocrats" was a result of the debt growth, the deepening economic crisis, and the agreements it made with the IMF to continue receiving loans. This behavior also resulted in the social unrest that "politicians who feel displaced and who continue to support the thesis of revolutionary nationalism" brought about." At the political level, the electoral and constitutional reforms were a government response to pressure from the opposition, "at the same time [they obeyed] the control purposes of the ruling party."

The CFE's composition changed, putting the PRI front and center and eliminating the need for support from opposition parties; furthermore, it was confirmed that this encouraged the so-called "parastatal parties," also known as voters. or "satellite parties", those that normally supported the PRI and that at that time were the Authentic Party of the Mexican Revolution (PARM), the Popular Socialist Party (PPS) and the Socialist Workers Party (PST), - to challenge his former ally. The opposition started to gain traction during this time, both on the left and the right, to the point where the PAN started to pose a "threat" to the PRI in some state elections, as happened in the 1986 Chihuahua state election

Added to the above was the split within the dominant party. For the PRI elite, the situation meant that they needed to "move to the right and block the main leftists." In this context, Cuauhtémoc Cárdenas Solórzano, Porfirio Muñoz Ledo, and Rodolfo González Guevara formed the Democratic Current within the PRI in 1986. Its establishment was caused by the "abandonment of State intervention in the economy, budget cuts, privatization of companies in the parastatal sector and the contraction of social spending." This shift in governmental action implied, for Cárdenas and Muñoz Ledo, a betrayal of the party's ideological foundation, "the ideology of the Mexican Revolution."

=== 1986 constitutional reforms ===
An agreement signed by President Miguel de la Madrid was published in the Official Gazette of the Federation (DOF) on 19 June 1986. It directed the Ministry of the Interior to call on national political parties, associations, organizations, institutions and citizens to take part in "public consultation hearings on the Electoral Political renewal [...]" in order to seek feedback that would enable the president to "find ways of democratic improvement." The "renewal" described changes to the electoral laws. The consultations took place in July and August. De la Madrid subsequently proposed an initiative on 3 November to amend sections 54 and 77 of the constitution, as well as articles 52, 53, 56, and 60. The reforms, which involved adjustments to the Chamber of Deputies electoral system, were approved by the Chamber at the end of November, and published in the DOF on 15 December.

The changes included increasing the number of deputies from 400 to 500 by raising the number of seats elected by proportional representation from 100 to 200, limiting the maximum number of seats that the party with the most votes could win (350) and allowing all parties to participate in elections regardless of their percentage of the total votes cast.

To guarantee that a party maintained an absolute majority in the Chamber, a mechanism was also established: "The party with the greatest evidence of majority will be assigned proportional representation deputies, until the absolute majority is reached [...]" if no party receives 51% of the effective national vote and none of them reach half plus one of the chamber's members. In contrast, a three-year decree established the Senate's partial renewal.

Following the reforms, article 60 stipulated that the federal government would be in charge of "preparation, development, and monitoring of the electoral processes" and that each "Chamber will qualify the elections of its members and resolve any doubts that may arise about them".

=== Federal Electoral Code of 1987 ===
De la Madrid sent the Chamber of Deputies his proposed Federal Electoral Code in November 1986. On 17 December the following year the parliamentary groups of five parties that had protested the initiative and the removal of their projects had their petition rejected. This marked the beginning of the debates in this regard. It was then published in the DOF on 12 February 1987.

With the implementation of the annual electoral roll review, the new electoral code eliminated conditional registration of political formations, facilitated coalition formation, and established the principle of public financing for political parties based on vote and seat totals. It changed the composition of the Federal Electoral Commission (CFE) and added the Federal Electoral Contentious Tribunal, which is in charge of handling claims, complaints, and annulment appeals: However, the Congress of the Union established political party representation, with one commissioner for each formation receiving 1.5% of the vote and one for each additional 3%, up to a maximum of 16 commissioners per party. It would still be led by the Secretary of the Interior, who also served as its president.

==== Parallel vote tabulation ====
This was the first time that a parallel vote tabulation was implemented in Mexico, and the results were informed by telephone from the electoral districts to the secretariat of the Interior. The institution in charge of counting the votes was the Comisión Federal Electoral (CFE), presided by the Secretary of the Interior, Manuel Bartlett.

On July 2, four days before the elections, Francisco Xavier Ovando, Cárdenas' top adviser, and his assistant Román Gil were assassinated in Mexico City. According to Cárdenas, Ovando designed a network to collect information from the 300 electoral districts on election day in order to prevent the PRI from engaging in electoral fraud. Two days later, FDN representatives protested the assassination outside the Secretariat of the Interior. Manuel Bartlett promised that the government would investigate the crime immediately, but it took many years before four Michoacán Police agents were charged with the assassination, with José Franco Villa (the state's attorney general at the time) among the intellectual authors.The Governor of Michoacán at the time of the assassinations, Luis Martínez Villicaña, had been one of Cárdenas fiercest rivals, and had heavily repressed FDN officials and sympathizers in the State.

== Organization ==
=== Electoral authorities ===
With the reforms of 1986 and 1987, the composition of the Federal Electoral Commission (CFE) was transformed. The consolidation of power within the PRI under its president, the Secretary of the Interior, and the PRI's increased strength within the body "appear as government attempts to strengthen control over electoral competition." They make clear, though, that these intentions were not successful due to the political environment. The PRI used its majority of votes in the CFE—19, to be exact—to settle disputes against the wishes of the other parties on multiple occasions. The votes came from 16 commissioners, two congressional representatives, and the commission president. The opposition parties' request to extend the registration period, which was set by the Code to end on December 31, 1987, is an example of the aforementioned. The PRI voted against it, claiming it would be illegal and shorten other deadlines. Approximately 38 million people were added to the voter registry in preparation for these elections. The National Population Council (CONAPO) estimated that by 1987, the number of Mexicans with voting rights would be 43.5 million.

For the opposition, a few media outlets, and subject-matter experts believed that the registry was untrustworthy. Twenty to thirty percent were thought to be irregular. In this regard, the National Institute of Statistics and Geography (INEGI), which calculated that 40 million people had the right to vote, joined CONAPO. The Republic's presidency, for its part, estimated that there would be "close to 38 million Mexicans." The official data indicated 38,074,926 individuals on the registry. Similarly, the Mexican Socialist Party (PMS) withdrew its candidacy in favor of Cuauhtémoc Cárdenas, and the PRI was able to enforce its choice. The PRI denied the request to reprint the electoral ballots, whose printing was handled by the Nation's Graphic Workshops, in order to keep the discussion focused on technical matters. as with the number of registered voters, the number of boxes installed varies according to the sources at the time - between 54,652 and 56,642.

As opposed to the previous statement, assuring, the CFE did, on occasion, attempt to reach an understanding and compromise on "thorny issues." They cite the formation of a subcommittee tasked with investigating allegations of destroying electoral propaganda and using public funds to benefit the PRI, as well as a complaint filed against Televisa for airing a show that misrepresented the views of PRI opponents. The design of the electoral ballot for senators was also a source of contention, with opponents requesting differentiated voting for one party for the six-year period and another for the three-year period - given that the Senate was partially renewed, a candidate from each state would hold his position for six years and another for only three.

According to the ruling of the Electoral Contentious Court, "the two formulas appeared on the same ballot and with a single circle per party." During the election year, the Court heard 23 appeals in total, approving the CFE's decision not to reprint the ballots following Pemesista's withdrawal. Nonetheless, the organization played a very small role in the election preparation process.

== Presidential candidates ==
=== Institutional Revolutionary Party ===
The PRI announced Carlos Salinas de Gortari, who was the Secretary of Programming and Budget at the time, as its nominee for president on 4 October 1987. At 10:30 a.m., the party president, Jorge de la Vega Domínguez, made the following announcement at the national headquarters in front of the sector leaders: "The three sectors of our party and its territorial leadership, have spoken unanimously in favor of comrade Carlos Salinas de Gortari's pre-candidacy."

the selection process for candidates was, nevertheless, "a fictitious one [...] with a parade of the supposed pre-candidates, which was nothing more than a mere simulation." In keeping with PRI custom, the chosen one was picked by the Mexican president, and the "uncovering ritual" was repeated amid a setting of "presumed party unity." This "simulation" was the ruling party's reaction to the "democratizing current" that eventually led to the National Democratic Front (FDN) being formed and the departure of a number of militants.

In this regard, the confrontation created by the Democratic Current (CD) made the candidate selection process "more open than before," even though it was not more democratic. Later, they called into question the president Madrid's economic strategy and called for a more democratic internal election system. Cárdenas requested that the PRI issue a call for the PRI candidate's selection on 1 June 1987. As the "democratizers" gained momentum, the party became aware of it. At the end of the month, when Cárdenas and Muñoz Ledo intensified their calls for the PRI leaders, they were told not to use party resources, logos, or speak in their honor. In the end, Cárdenas was pre-nominated by the CD on 3 July, with the primary goal of "putting pressure on the party and government to open the presidential succession process." Together with other politicians, Cárdenas accepted the nomination at a rally held at his house in front of two thousand people, along with the virtual pre-campaign coordinator Muñoz Ledo and Ignacio Castillo Mena.

In parallel, the PRI continued its uncovering process. At first, the Madrid cabinet's secretaries of state were all regarded as "not constitutionally impeded." Salinas de Gortari and the Treasury Secretary, Jesús Silva-Herzog Flores, stood out among them. But following a disagreement with Salinas regarding public spending, his exclusion from "presidential favor," and his resignation on 17 June 1987, the first lost his chance. Near de la Madrid, Alfredo del Mazo González, the Secretary of Energy, emerged as a "strong" contender. Consequently, del Mazo, Salinas, Interior Secretary Manuel Bartlett Díaz and Miguel González Avelar the Secretary of Education were among the most "popular" secretaries and best positioned candidates.

On August 13, the party's president announced the names of "six distinguished PRI members" who could run for president, including Sergio García Ramírez, the head of the Attorney General's Office, Bartlett Díaz, del Mazo González, González Avelar, and Salinas de Gortari. The names were listed in alphabetical order to "avoid suspicions." Other names mentioned in the media, such as Secretary of Health Guillermo Soberón Acevedo and General Director of the Mexican Social Security Institute Ricardo García Sainz, were also omitted. According to the official version, the six names arose from visits throughout the country that de la Vega Domínguez made to meet with party and opinion leaders. Everybody was asked to take part in appearances before the party leaders and guests, which were broadcast on television between 17 and 27 August during "prime television news hours" in "rigorous alphabetical order." Touted as a "lesson in democracy" and "the end of tapadism," these presentations were broadcast in their entirety and garnered news coverage on Channel 7, Channel 5 and Channel 2, after 24 hours.

the interventions had in common praise for the president and the "little precision" of the proposals. In order to dispel the "negative aspects of their image," the applicants presented themselves as politicians when they were "accused of being technocrats," and those who were less knowledgeable about economics "prayed" to show off their capabilities. To find out what they thought, the PRI "began a process of consultation with the bases and conversations with leaders". PRI members, on the other hand, declined to endorse any one candidate. The PRI released a call on 3 October and stated that pre-candidates would be able to register from 5 to 7 October. Bartlett, Salinas, and del Mazo were "considered with the most possibilities" during the "uncertainty" that surrounded the PRI candidacy announcement in the preceding days.

The confusion continued until October 4 when, in the morning, Núcleo Radio Mil—which was later joined by Acir, Radio Formula and Radio Programas de México—erroneously reported—due to a rumor that del Mazo spread That García Ramírez was the selected one. When Salinas de Gortari was finally declared the winner, the news spread quickly—"minutes, in hours, the entire country was aware of the name"—thanks to a "wide spread of information" that included state and private television. On the same day that Salinas was the only pre-candidate, the PRI pre-campaign got underway, and culminated in him being sworn in as a candidate. on the following 8 November; It was held at the national headquarters of the PRI and within the framework of the second day of the VII Ordinary National Convention and also marked the beginning of the presidential campaign of the official party.

=== National Democratic Front ===
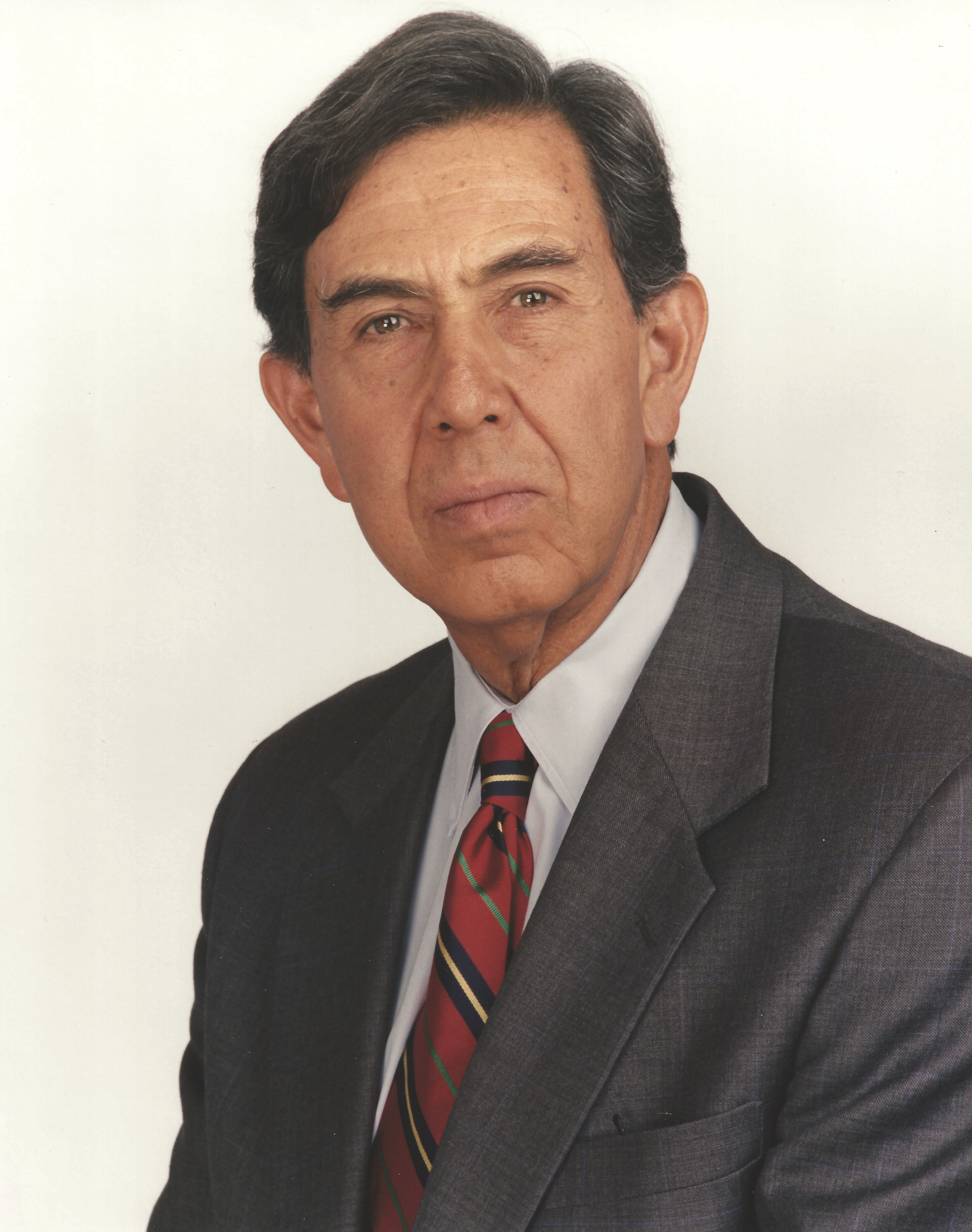
Cuauhtémoc Cárdenas Solórzano led the Democratic Current of the PRI and was nominated for the presidency by the PARM.

The CD announced its plan for a "PRI basic electoral platform" on 9 September 1987, and on 17–21 September it conducted the "100 Hour March for Democracy." The plan was to demand that the pre-candidate registration process be opened at the PRI headquarters, but on the 21st, the leaders declined, citing the possibility that their actions would be viewed as "provocations." As a result, they assigned a group of people to meet with the PRI leaders and present their demands. Following a twenty-minute meeting between a commission headed by Ifigenia Martínez, Oscar Pintado, and Castillo Mena, representing the CD, and Humberto Lugo Gil and Jesús Salazar Toledano, representing the party, the PRI refused to register Cárdenas "simply because there is no call for the registration of pre-candidates,".

On the 29th, the CD issued a manifesto defending democratic legitimacy as "a last effort in this regard." Owing to resource constraints, the manifesto was only published until October 3. The document cited Muñoz Ledo and Cárdenas' previous media statements, as well as the Corriente's disagreement, stating that "they have already revealed the search for scenarios outside the PRI." Following Salinas' announcement to run for office, Cárdenas spoke of "undemocratic procedures carried out by the leadership behind the [sic] militants' backs." It was in this environment that "the possibility of negotiating a single left-wing candidacy was envisioned" before Cárdenas left the PRI. In any case, "that's what two opposition parties said"—the Mexican Socialist Party (PMS), led by Heberto Castillo, and the Popular Socialist Party (PPS), which is currently without a candidate.

To come to a consensus, PPS leaders met with Cárdenas and Muñoz Ledo on 9 October. The PMS, for its part, tried to take in the CD. The Authentic Party of the Mexican Revolution (PARM), a third party, created a "serious link" in contrast to the "loose" approaches of the first two parties, and on 12 October a commission of assembly members proposed his candidacy. Cárdenas joined the PARM and participated in protests as its presidential candidate two days later. Castillo stated that Castdenas's candidacy was a serious political error and that his actions showed that he was more focused on the campaign than the issues facing the country. He even entertained the possibility that he could It is an action taken by the PRI directly. Likewise, the cupular decision of the nomination caused an "internal division" in the political formation.

Because of the previously mentioned, Cárdenas was additionally expelled out of the PRI. Article 211 of the party's statutes, which states that "anyone who joins another party [...] or is nominated as a candidate by another party to oppose the PRI [...] [resigns] his capacity as a member of the PRI," is the reason for the exclusion, according to a statement issued by the party on 16 October. It left open the possibilities for other formations to join the candidacy; his recent trajectory, and that he did not impose conditions or try to "appropriate the movement and the legitimacy of the Current."

Following the PARM, the Workers' Socialist Party (PST) officially changed its name to the Party of the Cardenista Front for National Reconstruction (PFCRN) on 22 November, combining it with Cárdenas's candidacy. Similar to the PARM, the CD in this instance "protected the Mexican Revolution's ideological and project hegemony." After a span of seven days, Cárdenas initiated his electoral campaign in Morelia, which was witnessed by 8,000 people as per the authorities and 35,000 people by the organizers. During his speech, he declared that the PPS and other political factions would be joining him shortly. This materialized on 13 December, when at its XIII Congress the PPS nominated it and with this concluded "the stage of gestation of fundamental alliances of the Democratic Current with registered political organizations." At that time, the Cardenista candidacy already received the support of unregistered organizations, such as the Social Democratic Party, the Democratic Union and the Revolutionary Socialist Party.

With Muñoz Ledo's departure from the PRI on 15 December, a wider alliance was formed. He later became one of the "main drivers" of the coalition, along with Cárdenas, and it began to take shape on 12 January 1988. On that day in the city of Xalapa, the Progressive Forces of Mexico, the National Council of Workers and Peasants, the Popular Action Movement, the Assembly of Neighborhoods of Mexico City, the Emiliano Zapata Revolutionary Union, and the Mexican Green Party all formally supported the formation of the National Democratic Front (FDN) by signing a common "nationalist left" platform. Until the July 1988 elections, he acted as a "political actor with full personality and precise functions," and the FDN was not a "terminal objective" but rather a "political-historical-electoral instrument at the national and regional level to define basic alliances and convergences."

=== National Action Party ===
The National Action Party (PAN) had an "unprecedented electoral boom in the northern region" of the nation in the years leading up to the election. A "pragmatic leading coalition fueled by the entry [...] of several businessmen" dissatisfied with the government provided the basis for its electoral profile. One of them, Manuel J. Clouthier - also known as Maquío - publicly announced his affiliation to the political party on 16 November 1984 at a rally held by Carlos Castillo Peraza - PAN candidate for the municipal presidency of Mérida.

Since then, he has participated in party events and ran for governor of Sinaloa against PRI candidate Francisco Labastida Ochoa in 1986. He and the other PAN gubernatorial candidates initiated a "more dynamic and aggressive style of conducting electoral campaigns" that included defending the vote in the event of fraud. PAN members used novel forms of "complaint and civil resistance" in response to a contentious defeat, which they saw as an act of electoral fraud. In Holy Week 1987, a group of PAN members and his friends convinced him to run in the internal race to be the PAN presidential candidate.

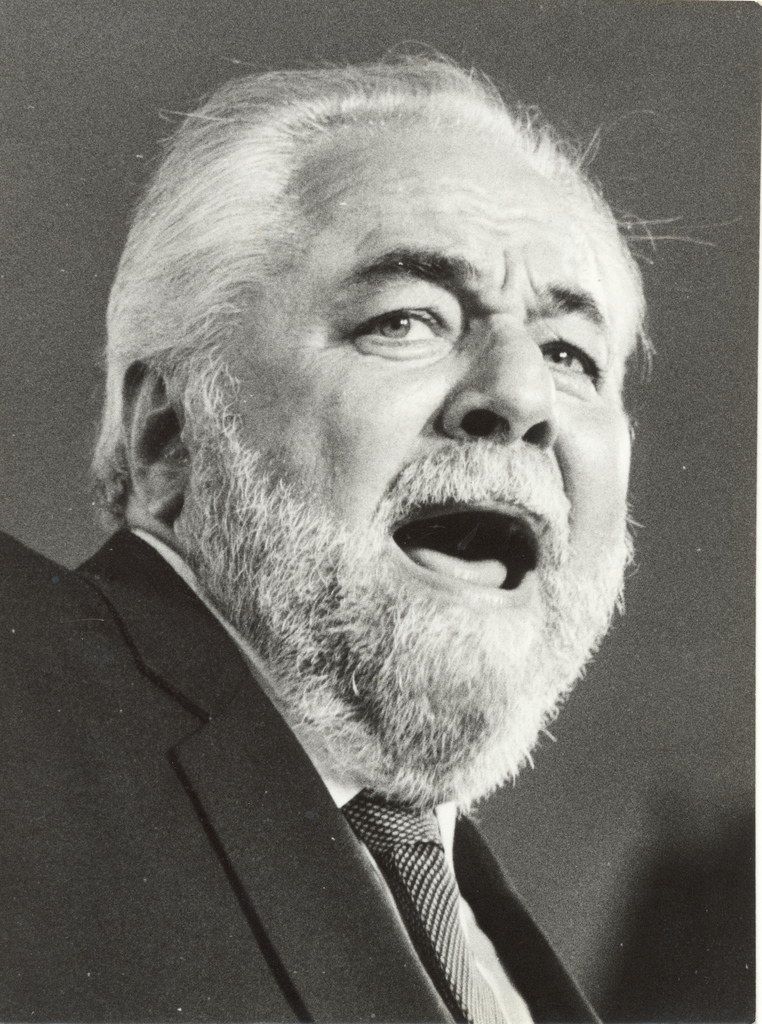
Manuel Clouthier

Clouthier received endorsements from the state committees of Nayarit, Sinaloa, and Veracruz when he registered as a presidential candidate on September 3, the following year. Salvador Rosas Magallón, Jorge Eugenio Ortiz Gallegos, and Jesús González Schmal followed after him. The second, however, retired for health reasons. September and November were pre-campaign months. González Schmal supported a "radical pragmatic" PANism that was driven by the business community and aimed to "break with the State and the party," whereas Clouthier supported this "aggressive, populist, and contradictory" PANism. He represented the "doctrinary" and most conservative group. Outside the party, the group led by Clouthier was known as "the barbarians of the north" - a phrase attributed to the PRI leader Fidel Velázquez -; Inside they were pejoratively called the "neopanists."

On November 22, Clouthier won the internal elections with 870 votes (70.3%), González Schmal received 335 votes (27%), and Rosas Magallón received 34 votes (2.7%). The convention lasted seven hours and took place in Mexico City's Juan de la Barrera gymnasium. González Schmal, who lost, expressed his support for Clouthier, who was also backed by party president Luis H. Alvarez. The candidate urged the populace "to resist and disobey those who, through the abuse of power, intend to continue oppressing them" and urged his opponents to sign a pledge against "fraudulent triumphs" and launch a "high-level political campaign."

=== Mexican Socialist Party ===
On January 10, 1987, leftist parties such as the Unified Socialist Party of Mexico (PSUM), Mexican Workers Party (PMT), Revolutionary Socialist of the Mexican People, and the Popular Revolutionary Movement merged to form a new party with the goal of changing the "political regime" and providing "broad channels for workers and peasants" to participate in "national affairs." The "Merger Agreement" that led to the creation of the Mexican Socialist Party (PMS) was signed on 29 March with this goal in mind. In order to choose its presidential candidate, the party held internal elections following its integration. Direct and open primary elections were to be the "new" system.

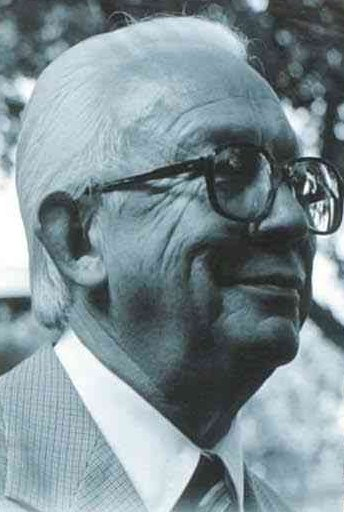
Heberto Castillo was the presidential candidate of the PMS

Under this system, any citizen of Mexico could cast a ballot, not just affiliated members. Heberto Castillo was put up as a pre-candidate in mid-June during a gathering attended by about 2,000 PMT-affiliated Veracruz peasants. Additionally, 154 base committees from that formation gave their support to him. Castillo thus joined federal deputy Eraclio Zepeda, PSUM head in Chihuahua Antonio Becerra Gaytán, and former leftist candidate for Hidalgo governor José Hernández Delgadillo. After the registration period expired at the end of the month, four verified candidates for the 6 September primary election were facing one another. Three days later, the PMS National College of Voters reported that Castillo was emerging as the winner. Moments later, Becerra acknowledged his defeat and the next day Zepeda did the same.

Castillo was announced as the party's presidential candidate on 13–14 September. In an article for the journal Proceso, the standard bearer himself stated: "I was elected PMS candidate for the Presidency with [119,600] votes out of [216,000] valid votes, 55% of the total." During his campaign, he put forth a "minimum plan of political and social transformations" and a "radical" program of political action with the intention of creating an "alternative power for the people."

When he announced on 23 June that he would consider running for Cárdenas if he "broke with the PRI," Castillo was among the first to denounce him. However, on 23 June he made this statement. In order to negotiate a single candidacy, the PMS nevertheless met with the CD and PPS on 15 October. During this meeting, Castillo claimed that the PARM was a "crude instrument of PRI dissidence" and acknowledged Cárdenas's "right" to join that party, but added that "now Cárdenas's option is not Heberto Castillo's." Castillo realized that his candidacy was at the service of his party," nevertheless. In this way, despite his candidate's claims that "the talks were opened," the PMS obstructed any kind of consensus. For Arnoldo Martínez Verdugo, Pemesista leader, the left had to unite to defeat the PRI and continue with the austerity measures, so efforts to achieve a "unified position" would be maintained.

Castillo eventually withdrew his candidacy in support of a unified Socialist coalition behind Cuauhtémoc Cárdenas Solórzano of the National Democratic Front a month before the elections of 1988.

== Campaign ==
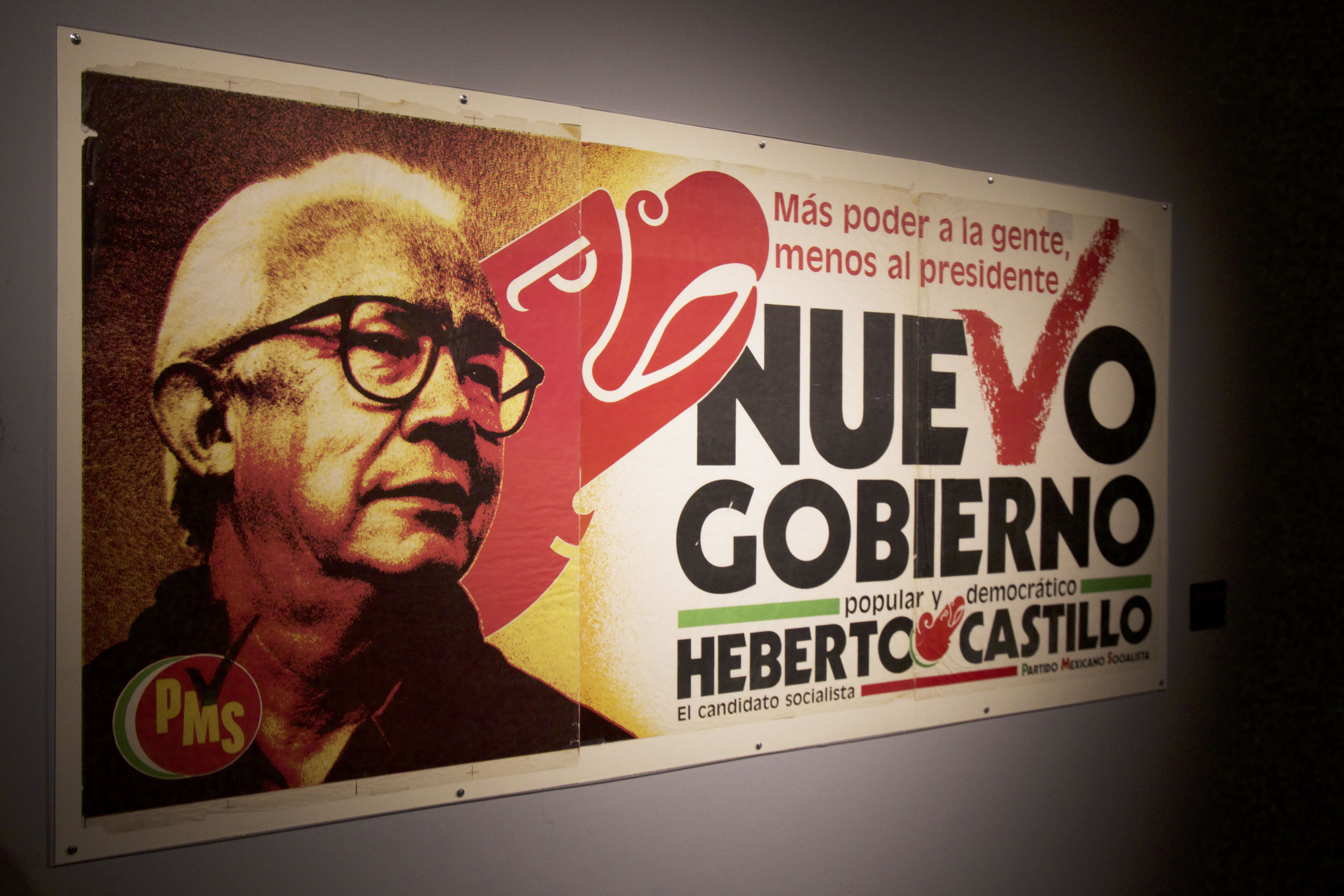
PMS Election Campaign

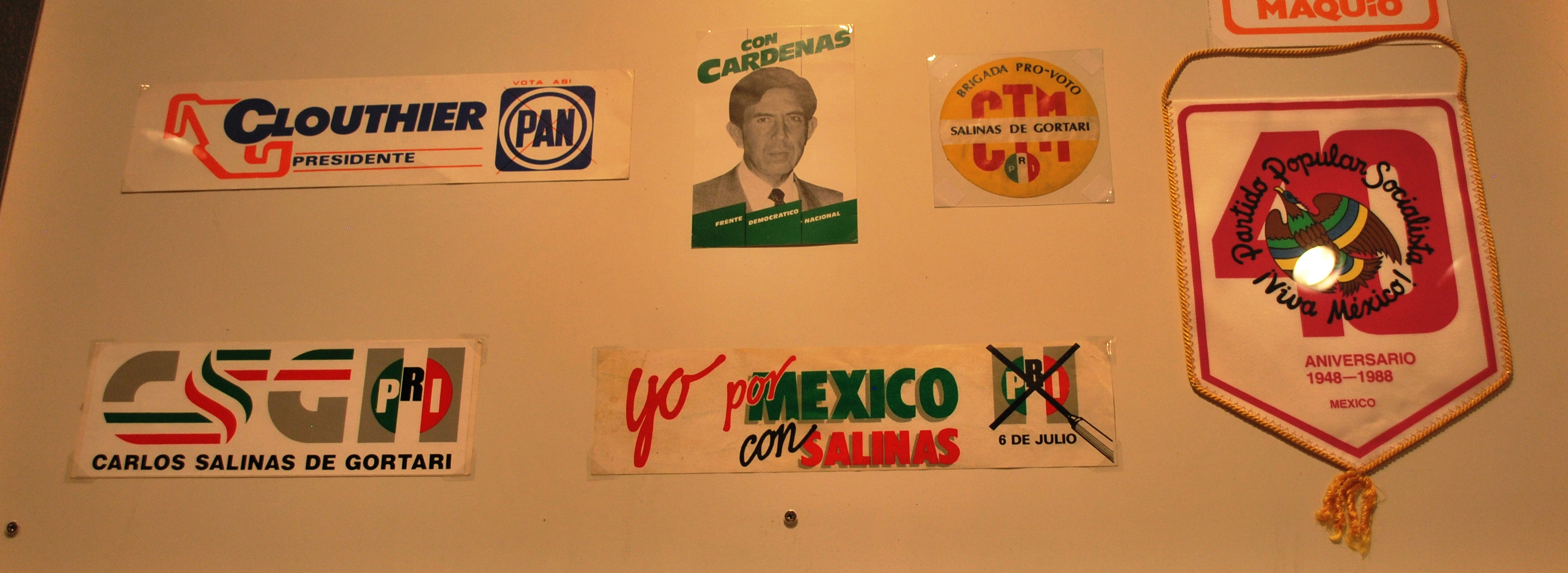
Stickers from the Salinas de Gortari, Cárdenas and Clouthier campaigns

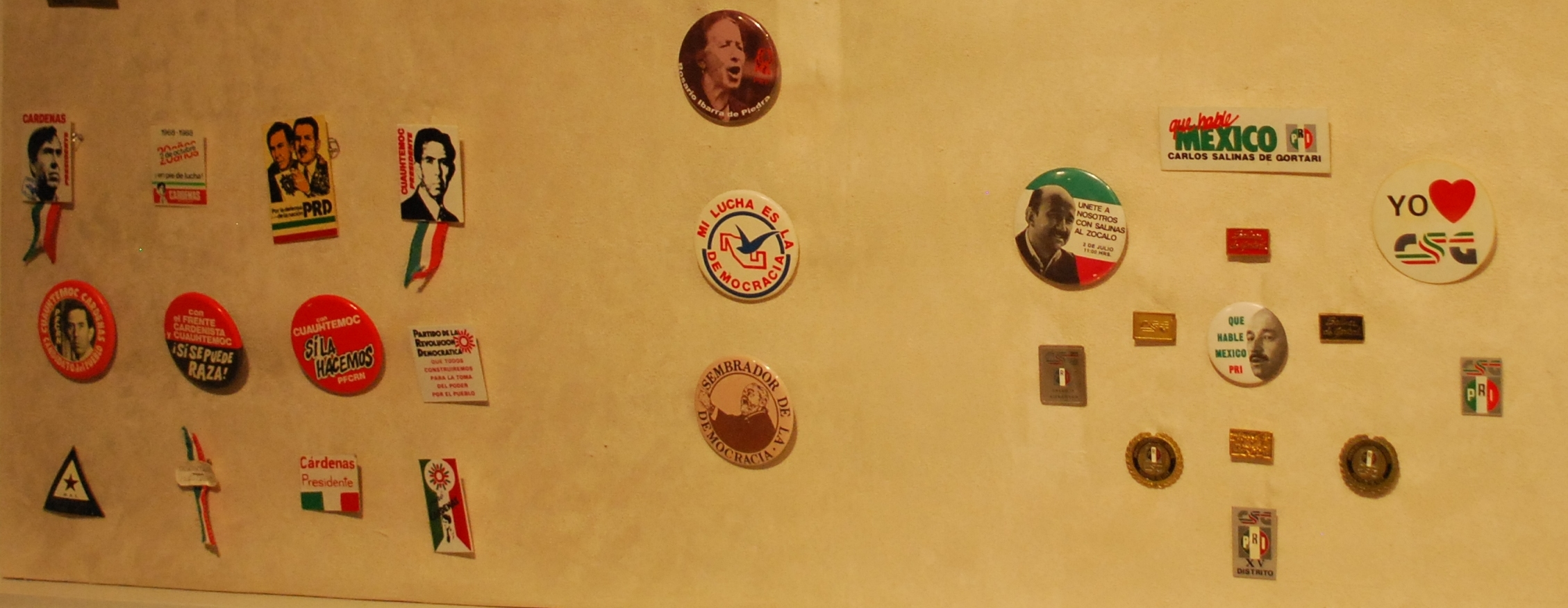
Campaign buttons from the Salinas de Gortari, Cárdenas, Clouthier and Ibarra campaigns

The Madrid government anticipated that the opposition would grow in these elections, but it did not account for the spread of the vote that the "multiparty system" would bring about. The author claims that the "high degree of politicization of society" allowed a glimpse of the "crisis" to be seen during the election campaign.

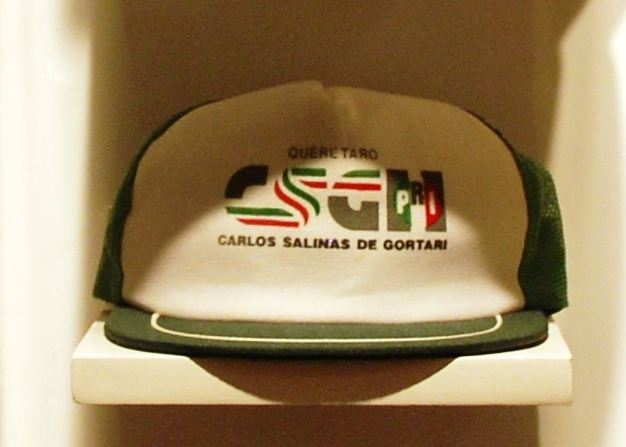
A Salinas de Gortari campaign hat.

== Opinion polls ==
During this election, Mexico started using electoral polls more frequently. Numerous opinion polls were presented as a result of the conditions surrounding these elections, which produced a "high level of competition" and "uncertainty". He does, however, note that the majority were restricted to the Federal District and the Valley of Mexico metropolitan area. Its execution was the responsibility of educational institutions, with assistance from media sources like El Universal and La Jornada, as well as American groups like Gallup, Bendixen, and Law. There were more than twenty exercises that involved "very diverse" media, researchers and methodologies. it was also within these circumstances that "the first generation of Mexican institutions specialized in public opinion research emerged."

Since the polls were not taken seriously before because, "in the social imagination," the PRI was virtually "invincible," this time they were a "novelty" because of their "proliferation and diffusion."There are nine nationwide surveys "of which we have a record," compared to twenty-one that are restricted to the Federal District. Similarly, it takes into account seven national polls and thirteen from the District, averaging them to award Salinas a victory of 52.0 percent and 36.95%, respectively. In the first instance, Clouthier came in second with 22.09%, and in the second, Cárdenas came in first with 31.85%. The PRI candidate received a minimum of 38% and a maximum of 61.4% of the total coverage nationwide. Regarding the nation's capital, Salinas led eight measurements, Cárdenas led four, and there was a technical tie in one.

The questionnaires, sample sizes, survey types, and "quality of the results" varied, which prevented the surveys from offering "certainty or reliability regarding" the electoral process. In this regard, the June 14 El Universal poll asked, "Do you believe that the electoral results will be reliable?" and 60.73% of respondents answered negatively. 60.44% of respondents said in July that the official candidate would win "despite everything," adding 76.45% to this percentage. The polls indicated that electoral fraud was planned, according to candidate Cárdenas, who shared this skepticism: "[The polls are] part of the game of the official party, but above all of the government, to alter the result of the election." Even though Salinas's numbers were favorable, the PRI reached "unprecedented" percentages and that Cárdenas "represented a rising opposition."

Survey	Date	Sample	Range	Salinas	PRI	Clouthier	PAN	Cárdenas	FDN	Castillo	PMS	others
La Jornada	8 and 9 February 1988	440 surveyed	Distrito Federal	37.8%		15.2%		15.7%		11.2%		
Sin autor	11 February 1988	234 interviews	Coahuila	46.7%	54.3%	19.4%	23.1%	17.2%	14.4%		1.2%	0.6%
PEAC	April 1988	1000 interviews	ZMVM	45.4%	44.4%	9.9%	17.3%	26.3%	17.1%	2.3%	3.2%	0.6%
UNAM/FCPyS	13 May 1988	9000 People	National	61.4%		15.7%		15.2%				
El Norte	June 1988	No Data	No Data		46%		36%		17%			1%
UAEM	2 June 1988	10 000 Citizens	State of México		40.0%		17.0%		24.5%		4.2%	2.1%
UAM	9 June 1988	594 Citizens	Distrito Federal	14.8%		15.8%		43.4%				
Proyecto Datavox-Punto	13 June 1988	1200 interviews	Distrito Federal	41.8%		23.1%		32.8%	27.9%		4.8%	1.0%
El Universal	14 June 1988	No data	National	57.1%		17.0%	20.8%					
El Colegio de México	19 June 1988	No data	National	61.4%		21.0%		17.5%				
El Universal	20 June 1988	No Data	National	56.2%		18.1%		21.6%				
Gallup	21 June 1988	2960 People	National	56.0%		23.0%		19.0%				
El Universal	20 June 1988	No data	National	54.1%		22.0%		19.1%				
UAZ	30 June 1988	2251 People	Zacatecas		41.4%		11.9%		23.8%		5.5%	1.8%
UNAM/FCPyS	No data	469 Questionnaires	Distrito Federal	18.9%		10.2%			52.5%			
El Universal	4 July 1988	No Data	National	57.2%		21.0%		18.0%				
Proyecto Datavox-Punto	4 July 1988	600 interviews	Distrito Federal	36.9%		23.4%		37.3%	26.1%		8.0%	1.1%
PEAC	5 July 1988	4414 Interviews	National	43.6%		17.4%		29.1%				
COMECSO	5 July 1988	No Data	Distrito Federal	32.0%		13.3%		32.4%				
Bendixen and Law	5 July 1988	1500 people	National	38.0%	36.0%	26.0%	26.0%	29.0%	22.0%		5.0%	
IIS/UNAM	No Data	400 people	Distrito Federal	14.7%		16.7%		42.7%		4.7%		

== Conduct ==
The Democratic Front and its leaders urged president De la Madrid to prevent an illegal act by bringing up the Salinas campaign's daily expenditures of one billion pesos and its strategy of pressuring and threatening the media to support the presidential campaign of the declared contender.

The primary Mexican television news program, 24 Hours of Televisa, was then run by Jacobo Zabludovsky. Manuel Clouthier also criticized the unfairness of the process and the lack of objectivity in the coverage, leading to the creation of one of his campaign's catchphrases, "Don't watch 24 hours because it hides the truth."

Democratic Front campaign collaborators Román Gil Heráldez and Francisco Javier Ovando Hernández were assassinated in Mexico City on July 2, four days prior to the elections. The Front's candidacy suffered irreversible harm when Ovando Hernández was named national coordinator of the plan to obtain electoral data from the polling places and districts.

=== Election day ===
On 6 July, the day of the elections, a "large number of irregularities" were recorded. The elections started at eight in the morning, according to media reports, and the CFE set up its permanent session to oversee the proceedings at that point. Nearly all polling places had followed the proper procedures. Yet, beginning at 10:00 a.m., rumors spread regarding "difficulties in some boxes." At noon, "an unusual influx of voters" was reportedly seen, and in the middle of the afternoon, PAN representatives in Sinaloa, Durango, Guanajuato, and Querétaro "began to complain about irregularities," ensuring that although "instrumented" electoral surveillance was increased over the previous election cycle, its goals were not met. For a variety of reasons, the reported irregularities lacked the requisite "forcefulness"—many protest letters were not received by the Electoral Litigation Court, and certain district committees encountered difficulties in receiving and handling the complaint materials.

The opposition commissioners complained at 2:00 p.m. over the magazines Impacto and Jueves de Excélsior being distributed. The former stated that the PRI had won with twenty million votes, while the latter was dated the following day and already confirmed Salinas' victory. However, Jorge Amador of the PFCRN asked that all commissioners be granted direct access to the computers that would contain the election results. Prohibition was also imposed, and starting at 03:00, the Army patrolled the polls in a "constant and discreet" manner. Furthermore, 38,000 Navy personnel were quartered. 56 thousand police officers participated in the "largest police deployment" that took place in the Federal District. In addition to 124 Public Ministry agencies that the Attorney General's Office ordered to remain open for business twenty-four hours a day, there were approximately 2,500 notaries who also had to continue their operations.

Among the anomalies that were brought up were the incomplete electoral rolls, the late release of the polling place's location, and the erasure of permanent ink. Clouthier and Cárdenas, backed by Ibarra de Piedra, started to "talk about joint actions." When the Commission meeting reconvened at 6:00 p.m. following a break, the criticism of actions like ballot box theft (sacks of ballots were tossed in the trash), the expulsion of poll workers at gunpoint, the "pregnancy" of ballot boxes, and voting by unregistered voters continued. The official party "resorted to its full repertoire of electoral tricks." Even in the days before the elections, the discovery of ballots marked in favor of the PRI was reported in states such as Chiapas, Jalisco, Michoacán and Veracruz.

Only a few days after the election, the Federal Electoral Commission received reports of damaged official voting packets and paperwork appearing in various parts of the nation. There were also reports of forged ballots inside the polls and PRI corporate union leaders withholding voting credentials.

== Results ==
The first official results arrived very slowly and inconsistently, but they showed that Cárdenas was in the lead. The first official preliminary results were expected to arrive at 19:00 on election day, but once that time arrived, the CFE informed that the counting system had "broken down", and that the CFE president had scheduled a meeting with the Technical Secretariat to "correct the issue". In the meantime, the opposition candidates began to denounce that they had not been granted full access to the counting centers, and marched together to the headquarters of the Secretariat of the Interior to denounce irregularities in the elections.

Later that day, the aforementioned Bartlett said that the telephone network was saturated due to, among other things, adverse weather conditions, characterizing it as a "breakdown of the system." Then-president Miguel de la Madrid later admitted that this "breakdown" was a fabrication. One observer said, "For the ordinary citizen, it was not the network but the Mexican political system that had crashed."

Although the CFE itself stated that it was not able to proclaim a winner yet due to the aforementioned "Network breakdown" (and in fact, would not release results until a week later), on 7 July at 03:10 the then-Secretary General of the PRI, Jorge de la Vega Domínguez, proclaimed that Salinas de Gortari had won by a great margin, stating that "Mexico has won and has given Carlos Salinas de Gortari a strong, legal and unobjectionable victory". Later that day, Salinas de Gortari himself also proclaimed that he had won. This sparked immediate protests from the opposition, who denounced that a massive electoral fraud was taking place.

=== President ===
Candidate	Party	Votes	%
Carlos Salinas de Gortari	Institutional Revolutionary Party	9,687,926	50.71
Cuauhtémoc Cárdenas	National Democratic Front	5,929,585	31.03
Manuel Clouthier	National Action Party	3,208,584	16.79
Gumersindo Magaña Negrete	Mexican Democratic Party	190,891	1.00
Rosario Ibarra	Workers' Revolutionary Party	74,857	0.39
Non-registered candidates		14,333	0.08
Total		19,106,176	100.00
Valid votes		19,106,176	96.49
Invalid/blank votes		695,042	3.51
Total votes		19,801,218	100.00
Registered voters/turnout		38,074,926	52.01
Source: Becerra Chávez

=== Senate ===
Party or alliance		Votes	%	Seats	+/–
Institutional Revolutionary Party		9,263,810	50.83	60	–3
National Action Party		3,293,460	18.07	0	0
National; Democratic; Front	Party of the Cardenist Front of National Reconstruction	1,727,376	9.48	0	New
National; Democratic; Front	Popular Socialist Party	1,702,203	9.34	0	–1
National; Democratic; Front	Authentic Party of the Mexican Revolution	1,154,811	6.34	0	0
National; Democratic; Front	Mexican Socialist Party	770,659	4.23	4	+4
Mexican Democratic Party		223,631	1.23	0	0
Workers' Revolutionary Party		76,135	0.42	0	0
Non-registered and common candidates		14,095	0.08	0	0
Total		18,226,180	100.00	64	0
Valid votes		18,226,180	96.35		
Invalid/blank votes		689,542	3.65		
Total votes		18,915,722	100.00		
Registered voters/turnout		38,074,926	49.68		
Source: Becerra Chávez, Nohlen, Villalpando Rojas

=== Chamber of Deputies ===
Results by party (left) and coalition (right)
Party or alliance		Votes	%	Seats	+/–
Institutional Revolutionary Party		9,276,934	50.97	260	–32
National Action Party		3,276,824	18.00	101	+63
National; Democratic; Front	Party of the Cardenist Front of National Reconstruction	1,704,532	9.37	36	New
National; Democratic; Front	Popular Socialist Party	1,673,863	9.20	49	+38
National; Democratic; Front	Authentic Party of the Mexican Revolution	1,124,575	6.18	30	+19
National; Democratic; Front	Mexican Socialist Party	810,372	4.45	24	+6
Mexican Democratic Party		244,458	1.34	0	–12
Workers' Revolutionary Party		88,637	0.49	0	–6
Total		18,200,195	100.00	500	+100
Valid votes		18,200,195	96.70		
Invalid/blank votes		620,220	3.30		
Total votes		18,820,415	100.00		
Registered voters/turnout		38,074,926	49.43		
Source: Nohlen, Villalpando Rojas

== Analysis ==
Years later, the aforementioned Miguel de la Madrid admitted in an autobiography that the infamous "network breakdown" never happened, and that there was not yet any official vote count when the PRI declared Salinas as the winner. In 1991, the ruling PRI and the opposition PAN approved a motion to burn all the ballots, therefore removing all evidence of the fraud. In 2011, PRI politician and contender for the PRI presidential candidacy in 1988 Ramón Aguirre Velázquez, stated that while he believed that Salinas de Gortari had indeed won, the real percentage of votes for him had been around 49%, which greatly alarmed the PRI since they had never obtained less than half of the votes in previous presidential elections they participated in since their foundation, and that the "network breakdown" was precisely an excuse Bartlett came up with to rig the election and to give Salinas enough votes to reach at least 50%.

In July 2017, Manuel Bartlett, former Secretary of the Interior, declared to the media that electoral fraud had been committed through the manipulation of figures, in addition to the fact that this had been carried out in complicity with the National Action Party to prevent Cuauhtémoc Cárdenas from becoming president.

A 2019 study in the American Political Science Review found "evidence of blatant alterations" in approximately one third of the tallies in the election.

== Aftermath ==
Numerous protests were held throughout the country in the following days. Some of the many irregularities denounced by the opposition included duplicated Voter ID's, anticipated delivery of ballots with votes already marked for the PRI, and even votes from dead people.

On 13 July, exactly one week after the election, the CFE finally released its official results, according to which Carlos Salinas de Gortari had won the election with 50.36% of the votes. Bartlett asked all the political parties to "accept the popular will". However, the nationwide protests continued.

On 1 September, while president De la Madrid was giving his final Address to the Congress, he was interrupted by opposition legislators from the FDN, who protested against the fraud; meanwhile, the PAN legislators stood silent, holding ballots as proof of the fraud. Other legislators threw punches. This was a stark contrast with all previous Addresses to the Congress under the PRI regime, which until then had been little more than ceremonies dedicated to celebrate the President, who would receive unanimous praise from the chamber. Journalist Fidel Samaniego noted that on 1 September 1988 the old ritual of the Address to the Congress had died. The opposition legislators noted that the Constitution established the right of interpellation in Congress.

On 9 September the Chamber of Deputies met to validate the elections. It was already expected that the Deputies would validate the election since the PRI held 263 out of its 500 seats, and thus the PRI legislators could validate the election by themselves even if the opposition unanimously voted against. After a 20-hour session in which the opposition legislators presented evidence of the fraud while the PRI members emphatically denied the accusations, the election results were validated: all 263 PRI legislators voted in favor, 85 opposition members voted against, and the rest abstained. The FDN legislators walked out during the voting. Thus, Salinas de Gortari was now officially President-elect.

Of the five federal entities (the states of Baja California, Michoacán, Morelos, the State of Mexico and the Federal District) in which, according to the official results, Cárdenas had won, three of their State Governors (the Governor of Baja California Xicoténcatl Leyva Mortera, the Governor of Michoacán Luis Martínez Villicaña and the Governor of the State of Mexico Mario Ramón Beteta) were forced to resign in the following months by the PRI, which held them responsible for the party's defeat in those states.

== See also ==
- LIV Legislature of the Mexican Congress
