= National Democratic Front (Mexico) =

National Democratic Front Frente Democrático Nacional
- FDN poster, published after the election. Slogan reads: Everyone in the defense of the popular will! The People voted – Cárdenas won
- Leader: Cuauhtémoc Cárdenas
- Founded: 1988
- Dissolved: 1988
- Merged into: Party of the Democratic Revolution
- Ideology: Democratic socialism Left-wing nationalism Progressivism; Cardenismo; Indigenismo
- Political position: Left-wing
- Member parties: PMS; PARM; PFCRN; PPS; Coalición Obrera, Campesina y Estudiantil del Istmo; Unión Popular Revolucionaria Emiliano Zapata; Central Campesina Cardenista; Central Independiente de Obreros Agrícolas y Campesinos; Asamblea de Barrios de la Ciudad de México; Unión de Colonias Populares

The National Democratic Front (Spanish: Frente Democrático Nacional) was a coalition of Mexican left-wing political parties created to compete in the 1988 presidential elections and, as such, was the immediate predecessor of the Party of the Democratic Revolution (PRD). It was the result of an agglutination of small political left and center-left forces with dissident members from the Institutional Revolutionary Party (PRI). Their candidate for the presidential election was Cuauhtémoc Cárdenas.

== History ==
=== Background ===
The National Democratic Front had its origins in the PRI, where the Democratic Current – founded in 1986 and led by Cuauhtémoc Cárdenas, Porfirio Muñoz Ledo, Ifigenia Martínez, and others – tried to democratize the internal selection of the PRI's presidential candidate, while also protesting against the economic policies of then-president Miguel de la Madrid. When in October 1987 Carlos Salinas de Gortari was nominated the official PRI candidate by De la Madrid, the members of the Democratic Current broke from the PRI, looking for a party to support Cárdenas's presidential candidacy.

On 14 October 1987, Cárdenas was nominated by the Authentic Party of the Mexican Revolution (PARM). Shortly after, the Party of the Cardenist Front of National Reconstruction (PFCRN), the Social Democratic Party, the Popular Socialist Party (PPS), the Liberal Party and the Green Party (the predecessor the Ecologist Green Party of Mexico), all of them small political forces, endorsed him as well. These parties only nominated Cárdenas as their candidate, but they did not contribute to the later formation of the Party of the Democratic Revolution.

=== Formation ===
Cárdenas and Muñoz Ledo made a pact in 1988 with the Mexican left in which the Mexican Socialist Party (whose candidate was Heberto Castillo) endorsed Cárdenas's candidacy as well. It also allied itself with many social organizations, like the Coalition of Workers, Peasants, and Students of the Isthmus (COCEI) (that had won the local elections in Juchitán de Zaragoza), the Independent Central of Agricultural Workers and Peasants (CIOAC), the Assembly of Districts of Mexico Mexico (Asamblea de Barrios, created after 1985 earthquakes), the Union of Popular Colonies and the Emiliano Zapata Revolutionary Union among others. This agglomerate of civil parties and organizations was, along with the Democratic Current of the PRI, the base of the future PRD.

=== Aftermath ===
The official winner of the 6 July 1988 presidential election was Carlos Salinas de Gortari, in what has been widely considered a fraudulent election. Cárdenas protested against the alleged fraud, and he claimed victory for himself. Cárdenas and the other leaders of the FDN held large-sclae protests against the fraud, but they were unable to prevent Salinas de Gortari from taking office.

After the elections, many of the parties and social organizations that had formed the National Democratic Front decided to join forces to create a new party, the Party of the Democratic Revolution (PRD), that would be formally founded on 5 May 1989, with Cuauhtémoc Cárdenas as its president.
