= Authentic Party of the Mexican Revolution =

Defunct political party in Mexico

Authentic Party of the Mexican Revolution Partido Auténtico de la Revolución Mexicana
- Founder: Jacinto B. Treviño; Juan Barragán Rodríguez
- Founded: February 1954
- Dissolved: 30 August 2000
- Split from: Institutional Revolutionary Party
- Ideology: Revolutionary nationalism Left-wing nationalism
- Political position: Big tent (Note: Described as Rightist, Leftist, and Centrist)
- Colors: Yellow, green, black, white

The Authentic Party of the Mexican Revolution (Spanish: Partido Auténtico de la Revolución Mexicana, PARM) was a Mexican political party that existed from 1954 to 2000. For most of its existence, the PARM was generally considered a satellite party of the governing Institutional Revolutionary Party (PRI).

The PARM was founded by a group of veterans of the Mexican Revolution who had been marginalized in the PRI, led by Juan Barragán and Jacinto B. Treviño, both revolutionary generals who had held important governmental positions. The foundation of the PARM was supported by President Adolfo Ruiz Cortines, who saw a way to have an officially independent party that would support the efforts of the PRI and would give the appearance of democratic competition in elections and in Congress.

From their founding to 1987, the PARM did not present a separate candidate to the presidency, instead backing the PRI candidates and supporting presidential proposals in Congress. It was only an independent competitor in one city, Nuevo Laredo, where it won the municipal presidency.

In 1987, the PARM broke from the PRI for the first time as it became the first party to nominate Cuauhtémoc Cárdenas Solórzano for president, leading to the beginning of the National Democratic Front. However, after the elections ended, it refused to be a member of the new party formed by Cárdenas Solórzano alongside the Mexican Socialist Party (PMS) and returned to its usual role as a satellite of the PRI.

The PARM lost its registration in 1994, but it briefly reappeared in 1999. The party nominated Porfirio Muñoz Ledo for president in 2000. One month prior to the election, the widening rift between the candidate and party leadership led to Muñoz Ledo resigning from his candidacy in favor of Vicente Fox. The party refused to recognize Muñoz Ledo's move but did not select a replacement candidate and definitively lost its registration in the ensuing election.

== PARM presidents ==
- 1954 to 1964: Jacinto B. Treviño
- 1964 to 1973: Juan Barragán Rodríguez
- 1973 to 1975: Pedro González Azcuaga
- 1977: Juan G. Peña
- 1977 to 1979: Antonio Gómez Velasco
- 1979: Antonio Vázquez del Mercado
- 1979 to 1983: Jesús Guzmán Rubio
- 1983 to 1993: Carlos Cantú Rosas
- 1993: Juan Jaime Hernández
- 1993 to 1996: Rosa María Martínez Denegri
- 1996 to 2000: Carlos Guzmán Pérez

== PARM candidates ==
- 1958: Adolfo López Mateos (allied with PRI and PPS)
- 1964: Gustavo Díaz Ordaz (allied with PRI and PPS)
- 1970: Luis Echeverría Álvarez (allied with PRI and PPS)
- 1976: José López Portillo (allied with PRI and PPS)
- 1982: Miguel de la Madrid (allied with PRI and PPS)
- 1988: Cuauhtémoc Cárdenas (allied with PPS, PFCRN and PMS to form National Democratic Front)
- 1994: Álvaro Pérez Treviño
- 2000: Porfirio Muñoz Ledo

== See also ==
- List of political parties in Mexico
