= José Hernández Delgadillo =

Mexican painter (1927–2000)

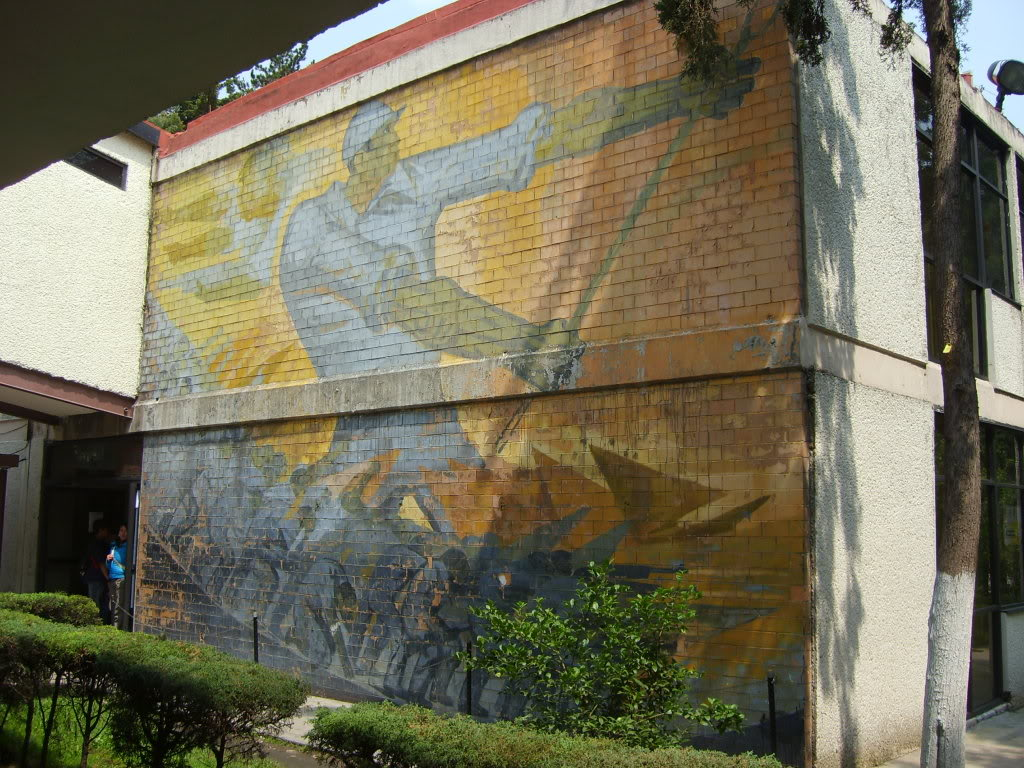
A mural painting in the National Polytechnic Institute of Mexico, artwork of José Hernández.

José Hernández Delgadillo (1927 – December 26, 2000) was a Mexican painter and muralist best known for carrying on the traditions of Mexican muralism in the latter 20th century. He created over 160 murals in Mexico and the United States, with most of his work, especially after 1970, containing strong political messages. Many of these messages have been unpopular in Mexico, which has made the artist somewhat obscure and some of his murals have been destroyed. Hernández Delgadillo's main recognition is membership in the Salón de la Plástica Mexicana honor society, but his home state has made effort to rescue and promote his life and work.

== Life ==
Hernández Delgadillo was born in Tepeapulco in the Mexican state of Hidalgo, the son of a poor rural farm worker. He grew up working on farms, road construction, in a greenhouse and making furniture.

In 1945, he traveled to Mexico City and studied painting and architectural drawing at the workshop of Antonio Navarrete Tejero. To survive during this time, he made money by creating portraits.

After the first individual exhibition of his work, he decided to pursue advanced training, attending the Escuela Nacional de Pintura, Escultura y Grabado "La Esmeralda" from 1955 to 1960. According to his autobiography, at this time he met Pablo O'Higgins which inspired him to continue the ideals of Mexican muralism.

In addition to his art career, he was also very politically active. He believed that popular organization in neighborhoods, unions and schools was necessary to exert non-violent pressure against the government. From 1980 to 1983 he wrote a weekly column for the Excélsior newspaper, which allowed him to write to present an alternate point of view and appear more neutral. In 1985, he stood for the Partido Mexicano de Trabajadores in the 38th electoral district, covering the Magdalena Contreras area and part of Alvaro Obregon. He was a pre candidate for president with the PRD in 1987, but the party chose Cuauhtémoc Cárdenas. The artist then worked for the Cárdenas campaign creating murals.

Hernández Delgadillo died in 2000, leaving behind his wife, Beatriz Zamora and three children, Beatriz, Myriam and Francisco.

== Career ==
Hernández Delgadillo's first exhibition of his easel work was in 1954 in Mexico City. He returned to school afterwards but when he finished his studied, he won recognition at two biennials, the II Bienal Interamericana in Mexico and the II Biennale de Paris for his expressionistic painting called Hombres (1961). This success earned him a grant to Paris from the French government. From 1963 to 1965 he lived in the country, exhibiting his work in Nice, Lyon, Marseille, Le Havre and Bordeaux as well as in the Reflets Gallery in Brussels and the Biosca Gallery in Madrid. The Musée d'Art Moderne de la Ville de Paris bought one of his works as well. He had another important individual exhibition in Beverly Hills in 1967.

However, most of the artist's career was dedicated to muralism, creating over 160 of them, twenty of which are on university campuses in Mexico. His first mural was painted at the Escuela Primaria Belisario Dominguez in 1959. In 1969, he was named director of arte for the Centro Residencial Morelos, a housing project in Mexico City. He and students created forty murals, the largest of which consists of fifteen floors of abstract panels places among the windows. In the center of the small plaza between the apartment buildings, he created a monument highly critical of the social order, which put his career at risk. In 1973, he created the first of his militant murals. His main support was with student organizations, which invited him to paint in universities, technical schools and teachers’ colleges in various parts of the country. The artist created the designs and usually the students did the actual painting, using simple colors. Many times, the mural was done in a day, with the students using the occasion to also present musical productions, and discussion groups. From 1973 to 1976, he worked on posters which featured large powerful figures in basic colors, based on the designed for murals in also done at this time in Mexico City, Toluca, Xalapa, Pachuca, Fresnillo, Zacatepec de Hidalgo, Tepic and the teachers’ colleges in Tuxtla Gutiérrez. In 1975 he created a mural in the medical conference center of the former Hacienda de Cortés in Cuernavaca. He created his first mural in the United States in 1981 in San Fernando, California, sponsored by a Chicano organization. He returned in 1989 to create several works for the agricultural school of University of California, Davis, a Latino social service organization in San José and the mayor's office in Watsonville. In the 1990s he created one of his major works called El Hombre Nuevo Hacia el Futuro.

Many of Hernández Delgadillo's murals are in urgent need of restoration with a number already lost, either due to deterioration or because they were destroyed because of their political messages. In 2013 an effort was begun Pachuca to rescue and restore his murals in that city, which include Contradicciones y lucha en Hidalgo at the Jardín del Arte and Por la democracia, el trabajo y la soberanía nacional at the Miguel Alemán primary school.

Other activities during his career include sculpture, receiving commissions between 1959 and 1960, and illustrating medical books in 1963 and 1972. In 1997 he organized the first competition of murals and public art called the Jornada Mundial del Arte Público y Muralismo, at the Palacio de Bellas Artes .

His main recognition was membership in the Salón de la Plástica Mexicana (SPM), an honor society for Mexican artists, serving on its executive committee in the 1970s. After his death, the SPM established the José Hernández Delgadillo Prize in categories such as painting, print making, sculpture, photography and art objects and held a retrospective of his work in 2009. The Efrén Rebolledo Cultural Center in Pachuca has a gallery named after him. However, his work has become obscure, mostly because they espouse unpopular and radical political ideas. There was no biography written about him until 2008, when Hidalgo writer Guillermo Furlong Franco published a book called Muros de Insomnio, about the life and work of the artist. It was sponsored by the Fondo Estatal para la Cultura y las Artes of Hidalgo.

== Artistry ==
Hernández Delgadillo was an artist and activist in the tradition of Diego Rivera, José Clemente Orozco and David Alfaro Siqueiros, with his work more closely related to the second state of Mexican muralism rather than his contemporary Generación de la Ruptura . This was particularly true after the 1968 student uprising in Mexico, which inspired the artist to incorporate its ideology to reinvigorate Mexico's traditions of murals with social and political messages. In 1975, he described himself as one of the few artists still “fighting for Mexico.” He stated that it was “… very risky to do political art now. You put your subsistence and liberty at stake.” He also stated “After 1970, I conceived most of my visual work in line with popular struggles, in books, periodicals, posters, films and murals; this side of my work is predictably ignored by the educated public, and negated and attacked even by critics who purport to be revolutionaries.”

He worked in oil, acrylics, mixed media, print and poster making and some sculptures in bronze. His style was mostly expressionistic, often denouncing acts of violence. Some murals, such as those done at university campuses rely on simple, basic colors but others more nuanced used of color, such as shades of reds and ochre are used to express anger at social injustices. Justino Fernandez wrote “In the works of Hernández Delgadillo, we find a definite sense of the monumental and certain underlying classicism combined with personal expressionism. This may seem contradictory, but is not, thanks to the synthesis to which he brings both tendencies.” “His giants – images of men and women, entire or fragmented nudes with extraordinarily expressive heads large or small, their features barely insinuated, their eyes tiny – betray his humanist leanings.” Similar to the artists of the Mexican muralism movement, he used indigenous cultural expression to highlight the country's heritage, its abilities as well as how it has been exploited. Many of his figures have a primeval quality, as if they sprang from the earth.
