= Heberto Castillo =

Mexican civil engineer and political activist

Heberto Castillo Martínez
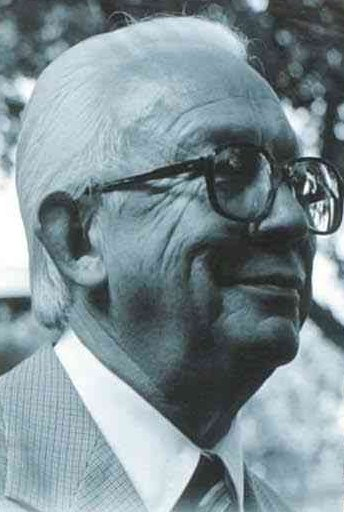
- Born: August 23, 1928; Ixhuatlán de Madero, Veracruz, Mexico
- Died: April 5, 1997 (aged 68); Mexico City, Mexico
- Education: National Autonomous University of Mexico
- Occupations: Civil engineer, political activist

Heberto Castillo Martínez (August 23, 1928 – April 5, 1997) was a Mexican civil engineer, political activist and inventor of the tridilosa.

Castillo was born in Ixhuatlán de Madero, Veracruz, and received a bachelor's degree in civil engineering from the National Autonomous University. An accomplished engineer, he taught several courses at the UNAM and at the National Polytechnic Institute, wrote several textbooks and invented the tridilosa.

He became a political activist and got involved in several workers' rights struggles, leading to imprisonment by the federal government in the infamous Lecumberri Penitentiary. Castillo was one of the first among leading left-wing politicians to express dismay at the dictatorial nature of Soviet-bloc governments, starting a movement towards a social democracy-based left wing and away from a Moscow-based left leaning opposition in Mexico.

During his lifetime he co-founded three political parties: the Mexican Workers' Party (Partido Mexicano de los Trabajadores, PMT), the Mexican Socialist Party (Partido Mexicano Socialista, PMS) and the Party of the Democratic Revolution (Partido de la Revolución Democrática, PRD). In his last years in politics he became a staunch critic of the Zapatista rebellion in Chiapas and, crucially, voluntarily withdrew from the presidential race in 1988 to support the unified candidacy of Cuauhtémoc Cárdenas.

He died on April 5, 1997 at the age of 68, in Mexico City and received the Belisario Domínguez Medal of Honor (postmortem) that same year.

Preceded by Griselda Alvarez Ponce de León	Belisario Domínguez Medal of Honor; 1997	Succeeded by José Angel Conchello Dávila
