= Tridilosa =

Light and resistant materials-efficient 3-D structure

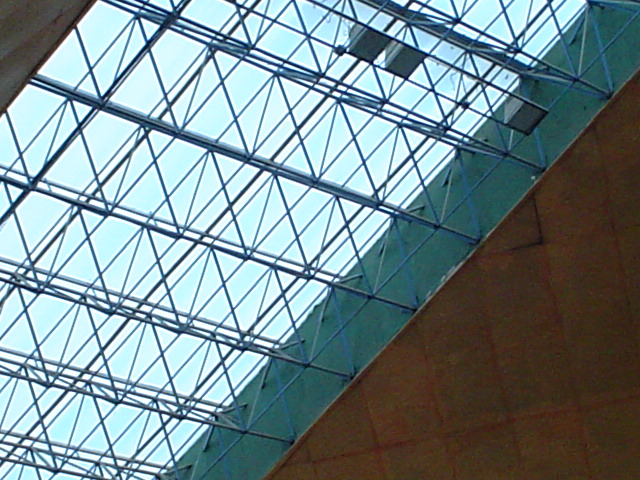
A tridilosa, in the ceiling of the Terminal Central de Autobuses del Norte, Mexico

Tridilosa is a very light and resistant, materials-efficient 3-D structure, made from steel and concrete and widely used in civil engineering. Tridilosa was invented by the Mexican engineer Heberto Castillo.

== Features ==
Among the most remarkable features of this structure is that it can save up to 66% on concrete usage and up to 40% on steel, because filling with concrete is not required in the tension zone, only in the superior compression zone. It is so light that it can float on water, but is three times stronger than traditional construction flagstone. It was used, for example, to construct the 54-floor Worldwide World Trade Centers Association of Mexico City.
