= Guadalupe Morales Rubio =

Mexican politician

- Born: 11 March 1966 (age 60); Mexico City, Mexico
- Occupation: Politician
- Political party: PAN (1980–2002); PRD (2002–present)

María Guadalupe Morales Rubio (born 11 March 1966) is a Mexican politician. At different times she has been associated with the National Regeneration Movement (Morena), the Party of the Democratic Revolution (PRD) and the National Action Party (PAN).

From 2000 to 2003 she was the mayor of the Federal District's borough of Venustiano Carranza.

In 2003–2006 she served as a federal deputy in the 59th Congress, representing the Federal District's ninth district for the PRD.

In 2018 she left the PRD for Morena and successfully ran for a seat in the Congress of Mexico City.

On 14 October 2024 she returned to the Chamber of Deputies as the alternate of Ifigenia Martínez, who was elected as a plurinominal deputy for Morena during the 66th Congress but died in office on 5 October.
