= Mexican Socialist Party =

Mexican Socialist Party Partido Mexicano Socialista
- Founded: 29 March 1987
- Dissolved: 1989
- Merger of: PSUM; PMT
- Merged into: Party of the Democratic Revolution
- Ideology: Socialism; Marxism; Left-wing nationalism
- Political position: Left-wing

The Mexican Socialist Party (Spanish: Partido Mexicano Socialista, PMS) was a left-wing Mexican political party, and one of the immediate antecedents of the present Party of the Democratic Revolution. It was the last effort to unify the different Mexican left-wing parties, as well as the last political party in the country to officially use the word "socialist" in its name. It existed between 1987 and 1989.

The PMS was founded on 29 March 1987 through the merger of the Unified Socialist Party of Mexico (PSUM), the Mexican Workers' Party (PMT), the Communist Leftist Union (UIC), the People's Revolutionary Movement (MPR) and the Revolutionary Patriotic Party (PPR). The Workers' Revolutionary Party (PRT) had refused to join the merger. Other socialist parties such as the Popular Socialist Party (PPS) and the Workers' Socialist Party (PST) were not invited to form a part of the merger as they were seen as being too dependent on the Institutional Revolutionary Party (PRI) regime.

The party participated solely in the 1988 elections, in which it had postulated Heberto Castillo as its presidential candidate. The party registered Castillo as their nominee on 30 June 1987 after holding internal elections. The following month, it was announced that a faction of the PST led by Graco Ramírez would join the PMS as its sixth integrant. However, a month before the elections, Castillo withdrew his candidacy in support of a unified Socialist coalition behind Cuauhtémoc Cárdenas Solórzano of the National Democratic Front.

In 1989, after the electoral process had finished, the PMS integrated with the old Democratic Current of the PRI and constituted the Party of the Democratic Revolution, with the own legal registry of the PMS.

== PMS candidates for the Presidency ==
- 1988: Heberto Castillo (declined)

== See also ==
- List of political parties in Mexico
