= Ifigenia Martínez =

Mexican economist, diplomat and politician (1925–2024)

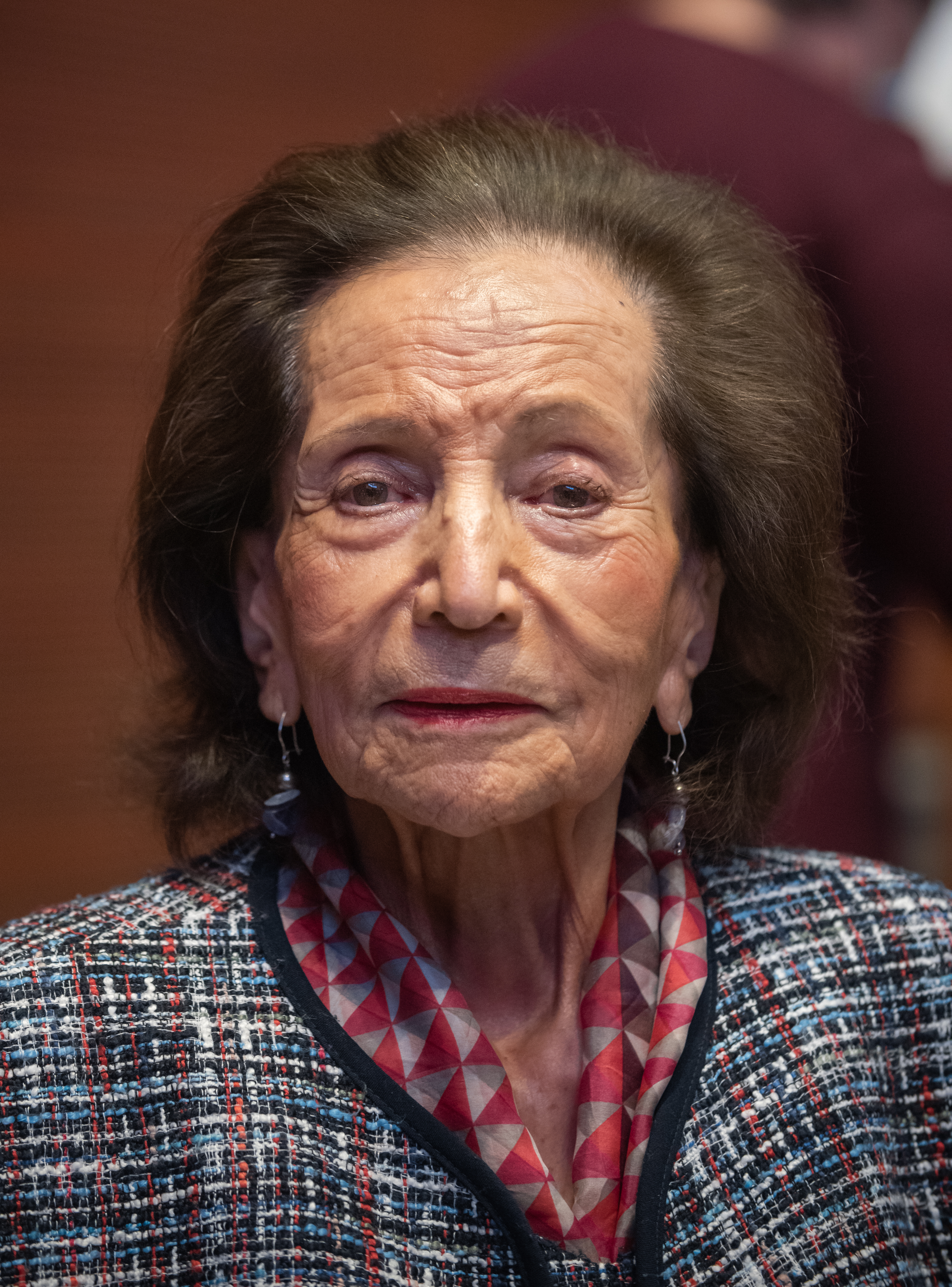
- Martínez in 2022

President of the Chamber of Deputies of Mexico
- In office 1 September 2024 – 5 October 2024
- Preceded by: Marcela Guerra Castillo
- Succeeded by: Sergio Gutiérrez Luna

Member of the Chamber of Deputies
- In office 1 September 2024 – 5 October 2024
- Succeeded by: Guadalupe Morales Rubio
- Constituency: Fourth electoral region
- In office 1 September 2009 – 31 August 2012
- Constituency: Fourth electoral region
- In office 1 November 1994 – 31 August 1997
- Constituency: Fourth electoral region
- In office 1 September 1976 – 31 August 1979
- Preceded by: Arturo González Cosío Díaz
- Succeeded by: Enrique González Flores
- Constituency: Federal District's 22nd district

Senator of the Republic
- In office 1 September 2018 – 31 August 2024
- Constituency: Proportional representation
- In office 1 September 1988 – 31 October 1991
- Preceded by: Abraham Martínez Rivero
- Succeeded by: Luz Lajous Vargas
- Constituency: Federal District

Member of the Constituent Assembly of Mexico City
- In office 15 September 2016 – 31 January 2017
- Constituency: Proportional representation

Personal details
- Born: 16 June 1925 Mexico City, Mexico
- Died: 5 October 2024 (aged 99) Mexico City, Mexico
- Party: Morena (2018–2024)
- Other political affiliations: Party of the Democratic Revolution (1989–2018); Institutional Revolutionary Party (1966–1988)
- Education: National Autonomous University of Mexico (BEc); Harvard University (MEc, PhD)
- Occupation: Diplomat; Economist; Politician

Ifigenia Martha Martínez y Hernández (16 June 1925 – 5 October 2024) was a Mexican economist, diplomat, and politician who served as the president of the Chamber of Deputies in 2024.

Martínez earned her undergraduate degree in economics from the National Autonomous University of Mexico (UNAM) and later obtained a master's in economics from Harvard University. In 1966, she became the first woman to lead UNAM's Faculty of Economics, serving in this capacity until 1970.

Throughout her career, Martínez was associated with various left-wing movements, including the progressive wing of the Institutional Revolutionary Party (PRI), the Party of the Democratic Revolution (PRD), and the National Regeneration Movement (Morena). She co-founded the PRD alongside Cuauhtémoc Cárdenas and Porfirio Muñoz Ledo. Martínez held numerous public offices, serving as a federal deputy in 1976, 1994, 2009, and 2024, and as a senator in 1988 and 2018.

== Academic career ==
Martínez was born on 16 June 1925. She studied economics at the National Autonomous University of Mexico (UNAM), earning her undergraduate degree in 1946.

Martínez, along with her future husband Alfredo Navarrete Romero, moved to Boston, United States, where they both pursued studies at Harvard University. Martínez completed a master's degree in economics in 1949, becoming the first Mexican woman to earn this degree from Harvard.

She became a professor of Public Finance at UNAM and taught at the Center for Latin American Monetary Studies (CEMLA) from 1957 to 1962. In 1960, she was appointed as a researcher at UNAM's Institute for Economic Research, and in 1967, she made history as the first woman to serve as director of UNAM's National School of Economics.

== Political career ==
=== Early career and offices ===
Martínez co-founded the United Nations Economic Commission for Latin America and the Caribbean in 1950.

Martínez made her initial entry into public office in 1953 when she was invited by Carlos Salinas Lozano to serve as the Head of the Office of Economic Studies. She resigned from this position three years later, following her outspoken criticism of the administration's economic policies, which caused discomfort within the Bank of Mexico.

In 1958, Martínez returned to federal public administration as an advisor to the Secretary of Public Education, Jaime Torres Bodet. She played a key role in analyzing the feasibility of the Eleven-Year Plan, Mexico's first attempt at long-term educational planning. Although the plan was not fully realized, it resulted in significant initiatives, including the provision of free textbooks and the establishment of a school breakfast program.

From 1961 to 1970, she served as the Chief Advisor to the Secretary of Finance, Antonio Ortiz Mena.

During the Mexican Movement of 1968, when the military occupied Ciudad Universitaria, Martínez was a vocal critic of the government's actions, staunchly defending the university's autonomy, which ultimately led to her arrest.

In 1976, Martínez secured her first popularly elected office as a federal deputy in the L Legislature, representing the Institutional Revolutionary Party (PRI). She chaired the Budget Committee and made history by leading a group of progressive lawmakers in opposing presidential initiatives—an unprecedented move in Mexican politics at the time.

Martínez was appointed as the deputy ambassador to the United Nations in New York, serving under Porfirio Muñoz Ledo. In 1982, she joined the Advisory Commission on Foreign Policy at the Secretariat of Foreign Affairs.

=== Role in the Party of the Democratic Revolution (1986–2002) ===
Alongside Cuauhtémoc Cárdenas and Porfirio Muñoz Ledo, she co-founded the Democratic Current, a Political faction within the Institutional Revolutionary Party (PRI), to pressure the party's leadership to address national debt issues and resist technocratization. After the PRI chose Carlos Salinas de Gortari as the party's presidential candidate, she and a group of progressive PRI members resigned to support Cárdenas' presidential candidacy, forming the National Democratic Front. Following the 1988 presidential election, Martínez became one of the key founding members of the Party of the Democratic Revolution (PRD).

In 1988, she made history as the first senator elected from the Federal District representing an opposition party. During the LIV Legislature, she was elected as Vice President of the Board of Directors of the Senate.

In 1994, she was elected to the Chamber of Deputies by proportional representation, where she served as the economic coordinator of the PRD parliamentary group.

She worked as an economic advisor to Cuauhtémoc Cárdenas, the first elected Head of Government of the Federal District.

In 2000, she sought the nomination from the PRD for the position of Head of Government of the Federal District. However, she ultimately withdrew her candidacy and endorsed Andrés Manuel López Obrador, who successfully won the election.

Between the founding of the PRD and 2002, Martínez held various significant leadership roles within the party, particularly in its National Executive Committee, including Secretary of Finance and Secretary of Parliamentary Affairs.

=== Later career (2006–2024) ===
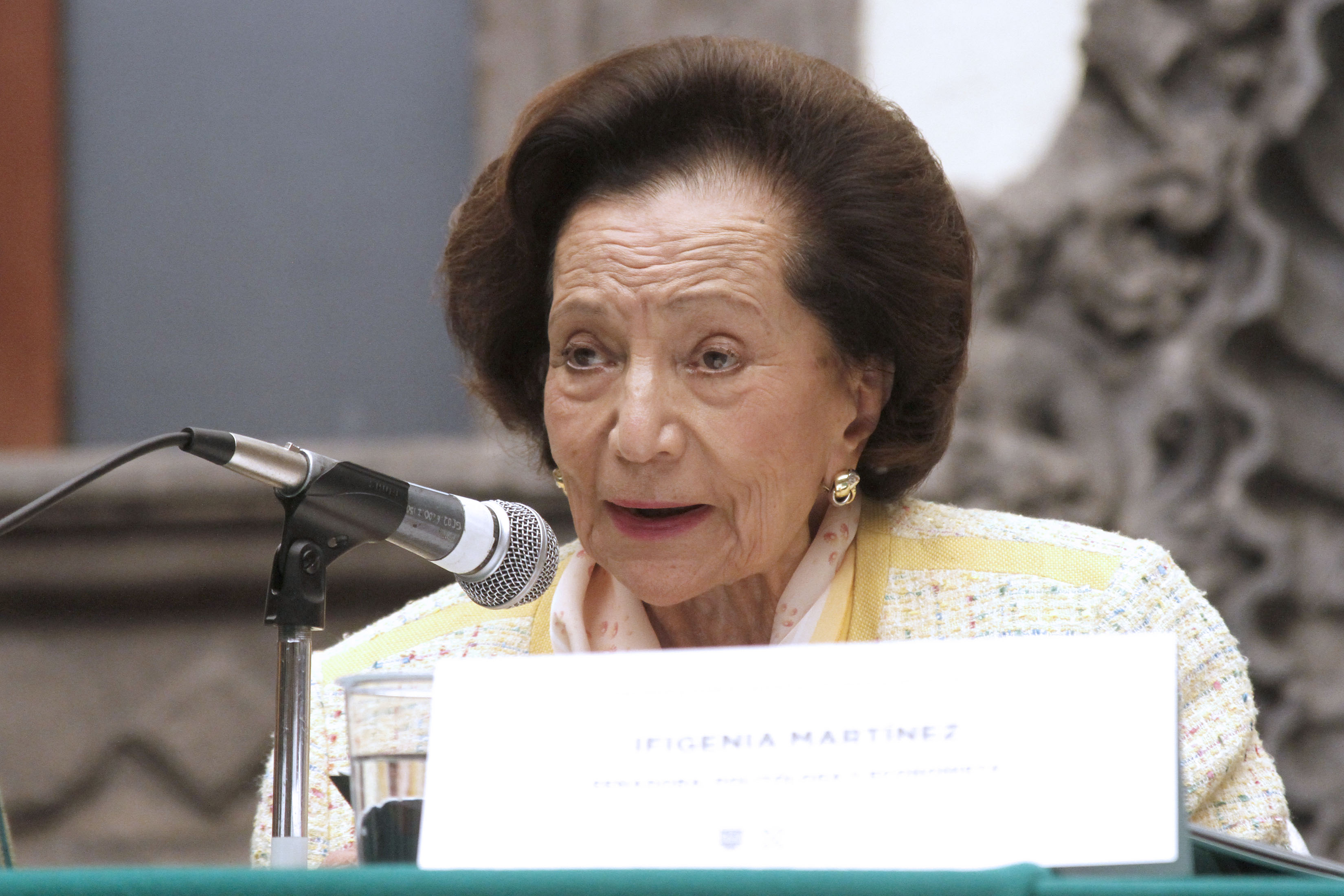
Ifigenia Martínez in 2019

Martínez was a member of the political coordination of the Broad Progressive Front legislative bloc. In 2008, during President Felipe Calderón's efforts to privatize Pemex, Martínez emerged as a prominent critic, forming part in López Obrador's National Movement in Defense of Oil.

She was one of several PRD members who aligned with the Labor Party (PT) for the 2009 elections, following a schism within the PRD that saw López Obrador's allies sidelined by party leader Jesús Ortega. Through proportional representation, she secured a seat in the Chamber of Deputies, returning to the chamber. Although the PRD leadership expelled her due to her affiliation with another party during an election, Martínez sought reaffiliation shortly after the election, arguing that both the PRD and PT shared common progressive goals.

Martínez was a key advocate for the political reform of the Federal District and, in 2016, she was elected as a deputy to the Constituent Assembly of Mexico City. The drafted constitution was approved in early 2017.

During the 2018 general election, Martínez advocated for a grand leftist alliance that would include the National Regeneration Movement (Morena), the Labor Party (PT), Citizens' Movement (MC), and the Party of the Democratic Revolution (PRD). However, this coalition did not materialize, as the PRD and MC ultimately formed an alliance with the National Action Party (PAN). In response, she endorsed López Obrador's third presidential candidacy and was placed on Morena's proportional representation list for the Senate as an external candidate. Just days before the election, Martínez resigned from the PRD, citing the party's alliance with the PAN and its shift toward conservative values.

Martínez held the presidency of the Board of Deans—a position she held due to her seniority—three times, in 2009, 2018 and 2024. Notably, during the LXI Legislature in 2009, she became the first leftist woman to oversee the swearing-in of deputies.

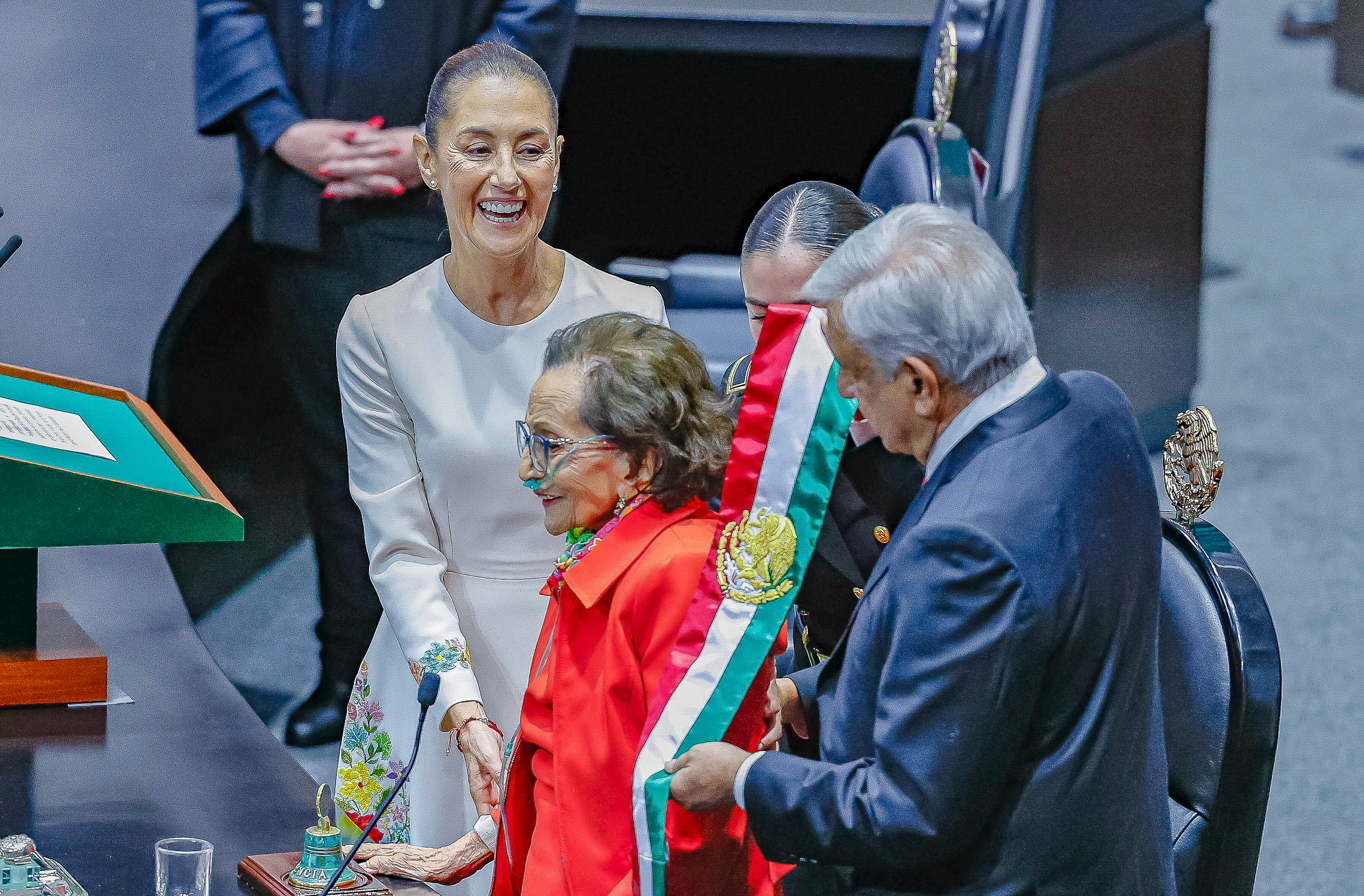
Martínez (center) during Sheinbaum's presidential inauguration, 1 October 2024.

==== President of the Chamber of Deputies (2024) ====
In 2024, Martínez was elected to the Chamber of Deputies through proportional representation, representing the fourth electoral region. At the start of the LXVI Legislature, she was elected President of the Chamber of Deputies.

Visibly frail, she presided over the inauguration of Claudia Sheinbaum as President of Mexico on 1 October 2024, during which she officially handed Sheinbaum the presidential sash.

== Death ==
Days after the presidential swearing-in ceremony, Martínez died on 5 October 2024, at the age of 99.

On 7 October 2024, her body lay in state at the Legislative Palace of San Lázaro. Her alternate, Guadalupe Morales Rubio, took up her seat on 14 October.

== Awards and honours ==
=== National honour ===
- Mexico: Belisario Domínguez Medal of Honor (7 October 2021)

=== Awards ===
- Benito Juárez Medal (October 2009)
- Sor Juana Inés de la Cruz Medal (7 March 2019)

== Publications ==
- Martínez, Ifigenia (1986). Deuda externa y soberanía nacional. Mexico City: UNAM. OCLC 18545491
- — (1989). Algunos efectos de la crisis en la distribución del ingreso en México. Mexico City: UNAM. 1989. OCLC 1025832545
- — (1995). Economía y democracia: una propuesta alternativa. Mexico City: Grijalbo. 1995. OCLC 1025832545
- — (1999). Globalidad, crisis y reforma monetaria. Mexico City: UNAM. 1999. OCLC 1024528987
- Martínez, Ifigenia (2001). El nuevo poder del Congreso en México. Mexico City: Porrúa. 2001. OCLC 932337353
- Martínez, Ifigenia (2003). México: desarrollo y fortalecimiento del sector estratégico de energía eléctrica. Mexico City: Porrúa. 2003. OCLC 949139246
