= Luis Martínez Villicaña =

Mexican politician

Governor of Michoacán
- In office February 15, 1986 – December 3, 1988
- Preceded by: Cuauhtémoc Cárdenas
- Succeeded by: Genovevo Figueroa Zamudio

Personal details
- Born: April 1, 1939 Uruapan, Michoacán
- Died: March 2, 2011 (aged 71) Houston, Texas, United States
- Party: Institutional Revolutionary Party

Luis Martínez Villicaña (April 1, 1939 – March 2, 2011) was a Mexican politician. He served as the Secretary of Agrarian Reform under Mexican President Miguel de la Madrid from December 1, 1982, until 1986. He left the Cabinet in 1986 upon his election as Governor of Michoacán and was succeeded by Rafael Rodríguez Barrera.

Martínez Villicaña served as Governor of Michoacán from February 15, 1986, until December 3, 1988.

Luis Martínez Villicaña died in Houston, Texas, on March 2, 2011, at the age of 71.
