= Jesús González Schmal =

Mexican lawyer and politician

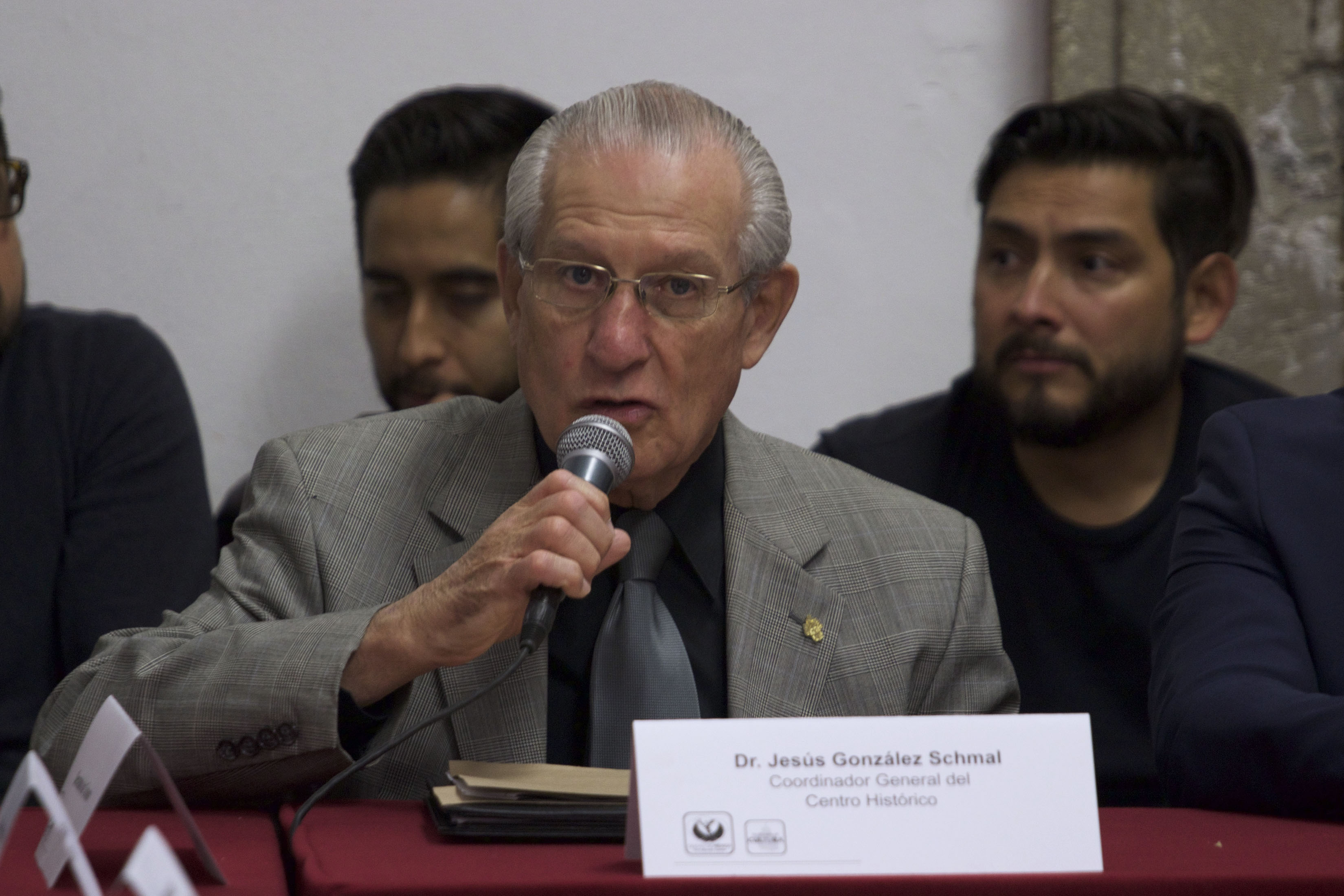
- Born: 6 November 1942 (age 83); Torreón, Coahuila, Mexico
- Education: Universidad Iberoamericana; UNAM
- Occupations: Lawyer and politician
- Political party: PAN (1979–1992); PDM (1992–2003); MC (2003–present)

Jesús Porfirio González Schmal (born 6 November 1942) is a Mexican lawyer and politician affiliated with the Convergence (formerly to the National Action Party and the Mexican Democratic Party. As of 2014 he served as Deputy of the LI, LIII and LIX Legislature of the Mexican Congress as a plurinominal representative.
