= Jacinto B. Treviño =

Mexican military officer (1883–1971)

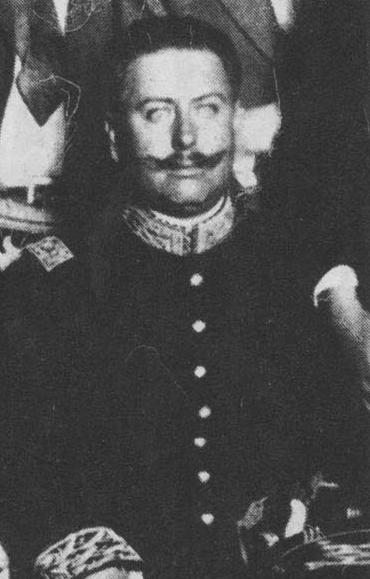
- General Jacinto B. Treviño
- Born: 11 September 1883; Guerrero, Coahuila
- Died: 5 November 1971 (aged 88) Mexico City
- Allegiance: The Federal Army, 1900 –1913, The Constitutionalist Army, 1913–1917, The Federal Army, 1917–1929
- Service years: 1900 – 1929
- Rank: Major General
- Conflicts: El Ebano

General Jacinto Blas Treviño González (11 September 1883 – 5 November 1971) was a Mexican military officer, noteworthy for his participation in the Mexican Revolution of 1910 to 1921.

== Early life ==
Jacinto B. Treviño was born in Guerrero, Coahuila on 11 September 1883. His father was Francisco A. Trevino, a former cornel of National Guard, and his mother was Trinidad González. He received his primary education in Monterrey, Nuevo León, and completed his college preparatory schooling in a government high school.

== Early military career ==
Treviño entered into Military Academy at Chapultepec Mexico City in 1900 and graduated 1908. He entered the artillery corps upon graduation. He did not participate in the Madero rebellion of 1911.

== Madero ==
When Francisco I. Madero became President in November 1911, Treviño was promoted to captain and served on the President's staff. In 1912, he participated in the campaign to suppress the Pascual Orozco rebellion.

Upon the conclusion of hostilities, he was assigned to the state government of Coahuila to help organize the state militia. In this position, he developed a close relationship with the state governor Venustiano Carranza.

== Constitutionalism ==
In February 1913, President Madero was overthrown and murdered by a right-wing coup d’état known as The Ten Tragic Days. Treviño joined Governor Carranza in refusing to pledge allegiance to the new government of Victoriano Huerta. Closely aligning himself with Carranza, he was one of the first signatories of Carranza's Plan of Guadalupe which claimed the Huerta government was illegitimate. Two days after signing the Plan, he was dishonorably discharged from the Federal Army. Carranza commissioned him a major in the new Constitutionalist Army to be formed to drive out the Huerta government.

Treviño participated in the military battles that Carranza fought in Coahuila during the spring and summer of 1913. On March 7, 1913, Carranza and Treviño won a battle over Federal troops at Anhelo. However, most of their battles were defeats and so Carranza decided to abandon Coahuila and set up his rebel government in Sonora which had been secured by the Constitutionalists there. Treviño accompanied Carranza in the five-week trek from Coahuila to Hermosillo Sonora between August and September 1913.

Shortly after arriving in Hermosillo, Carranza appointed Treviño as his Chief-of-Staff. In June 1914, Carranza promoted Treviño to brigadier general under General Pablo González. Carranza's Constitutional forces were victorious and drove out the right-wing government of Victoriano Huerta in July 1914. However, the victorious Constitutionals then split into two camps: those who continued to support Carranza, and those who were opposed to his continued leadership, primarily headed up by Pancho Villa and Emiliano Zapata.

A peace convention was held in Aguascalientes in October 1914 which hoped to resolve the differences between Carranza and Villa. Treviño participated in the Convention of Aguascalientes as a supporter of Carranza. The Convention failed to bring peace, and in December 1914, open warfare broke out between the forces of Pancho Villa and the forces that supported Carranza.

== Battles Pancho Villa ==
In his first independent command, Treviño was ordered to take command of the Constitutionalists forces in the Tampico area, and keep the oil-rich region out of the hands of the Villistas. On December 29, 1914, Treviño held off a Villista attempt to capture Tampico.

In January 1915, Treviño again held off a force of Villistas commanded by General Manuel Chao. Treviño is credited with constructing good defensive breastworks at El Ebano while Chao has been criticized for conducting unimaginative frontal attacks.

In February 1915, the forces of Manuel Chao were reinforced by the forces of Tomas Urbina. Again, Treviño held firm.

On March 21, 1915, Chao and Urbina renewed their attack on El Ebano again. This was to be one of the longest and most deadly battles of the Revolution. For 72 days, the forces of Chao and Urbina attacked Treviño at El Ebano, and each time, Treviño held.

Villa finally tired of this attack, and ordered Chao and Urbina to disengage and move the majority of their commands to the Celaya region where he was battling Álvaro Obregón. A small Villista command remained at El Ebano that was intended to hold Treviño in check. However, on May 31, Trevino advanced out of his barricades and defeated the Villistas. For keeping the oil-rich region out of the hand of Pancho Villa, he was proclaimed a war-hero and promoted to major general. He was then given command of the Army of the Northwest headquartered in the city of Chihuahua.

In April and May 1915, Pancho Villa and Álvaro Obregón engage in several long and deadly battles in the Celaya region of Mexico. The end result was that in early June 1915, Pancho Villa's army was destroyed, and the remnants of his army retreated north to Chihuahua.

While Villa's army was broken, he continued to wage guerrilla war in the state of Chihuahua. Treviño battled Villa throughout the latter half of 1915, and most of 1916, but he was never able to stop Villa.

On January 1, 1916, Treviño announced that 14,000 Villistas had surrendered and that the Villa insurgency was over. Still, Villa continued to raid the countryside. In March 1916, Villa attacked Columbus, New Mexico, which outraged the American newspapers. President Wilson responded by sending American troops under the command of General Pershing into Chihuahua to pursue Villa. This incursion into Mexico is known as the Punitive Expedition or the Pancho Villa Expedition.

On March 27, 1916, Villa took the city of Guerrero Chihuahua from Trevino's troops. However, Villa was wounded in the battle, and was unable to command for the next six months. Treviño, the Mexican government and the American government all believed that Villa was dead and that insurrection was over.

Villa recovered from his wounds and on September 6, 1916 raided Satevó, Chihuahua. Then in his boldest move, he attacked Trevino's headquarters in the city of Chihuahua on September 16, Independence Day. Treviño and his command were forced to flee the city, while Villa captured arms and ammunitions, and freed political prisoners.

For the next two months, Villa continued to raid at will, while Treviño appeared to be continually surprised, and unable to coordinate any offensive operations. At this point, President Carranza and Secretary of War Obregón begin to lose confidence in Treviño. On November 6, Obregón wired Treviño telling him that he would be replaced by General Francisco Murguía.

On November 27, before Murguía arrived, Villa again attacked Trevino's headquarters at the city of Chihuahua, and again forced Trevino to evacuate the city.

On December 1, 1916 the combined forces of Treviño and Murguía defeat a Villista force at Horcasitas south of the city of Chihuahua, and Villa main force was forced to abandon the city.

Murguía was highly critical of Treviño and an enmity developed between the two. Murguía was much more aggressive and successful against Villa, and Treviño fell into disfavor.

== Post Revolution ==
As the year 1920 approached, the succession of President Carranza became an issue. Carranza by law could not run for re-election, but he planned to choose his successor. Alvaro Obregón announced his candidacy, but Carranza did everything in his power to prevent the election of Obregón. Obregón had the support of most of the military, and when it became clear that Carranza would not allow Obregón to succeed him, Obregón's supporters revolted and overthrew Carranza.

Treviño at this time was a subordinate of Pablo González; they both owed their positions to Carranza. After much deliberation, they decided to support Obregón in the 1920 Agua Prieta revolt. When Congress voted to install Adolfo de la Huerta to fill out the remainder of Carranza's term, de la Huerta appointed Treviño to be his Secretary of Industry and Commerce.

In March 1929, Treviño supported the Escobar Rebellion, and when that rebellion failed, Treviño was forced to flee to the United States. The Mexican army discharged him for his participation.

Treviño was allowed to return to Mexico in 1941 and allowed back into the army as a major general. He was appointed the Director of the National Bank of the Army in 1947. He served in the senate between 1952 and 1958. He died in Mexico City on November 5, 1971.
