= Mexican Workers' Party =

Defunct political party in Mexico

Mexican Workers' Party Partido Mexicano de los Trabajadores
- Abbreviation: PMT
- Founded: September 5, 1974; 52 years ago
- Registered: 1984
- Dissolved: 1987
- Merged into: Mexican Socialist Party
- Headquarters: Mexico City, Mexico
- Ideology: Socialism; Trotskyism; Syndicalism; Anti-capitalism; Revolutionary socialism
- Political position: Left-wing

The Mexican Workers' Party (in Spanish: Partido Mexicano de los Trabajadores, PMT) was a left-wing Mexican political party, that had legal registration in the 1980s, its main political figures were Heberto Castillo and Demetrio Vallejo.

Despite having been founded and recognized as a political party in 1974, the PMT only participated in elections in 1985. This is due not only by non-compliance with legal requirements, but because although the political reform of 1977 created flexible figures such as registration conditioned, the party decided not to participate in the negotiations to grant the registration that the government offered to the opposition and therefore did not compete in the 1979 and 1982 elections.

== History ==
=== Initial Stages ===
The PMT had its origin in the years of Student Movement of 1968, especially the Tlatelolco massacre, with the participation of noticeable intellectuals and social fighters as Heberto Castillo, Carlos Fuentes, Octavio Paz, Luis Villoro and Rafael Aguilar Talamantes which all politicians gave origin of the Comité Nacional de Auscultación y Organización.

The objective of this committee was to carry out a consultation to determine the characteristics of the party that they would try to create. The conclusion was that a mass party would be formed in which workers, peasants, intellectuals, students and bureaucrats participated , but in February 1973, Aguilar Talamantes and Graco Ramírez made public their resignation from the CNAO to form the Workers' Socialist Party.

=== Life as a Political Party ===
Starting on September 5, 1974, the constituent congress of the party was held, which concluded on September 8. The date on which the basic documents of the party were accepted and the PMT was recognized as a political party by the government.

Among the PMT's strategies to develop its partisan activities. Since the party did not receive public resources, it organized a musical concert by Oscar Chávezat and managed a taqueria, established with resources provided by the philosopher Luis Villoro.

This was also marked by the use of various forms of propaganda, especially the political cartoon that was published in the broadcasting organ. in the newspaper Insurgencia Popular and documentaries, including one titled Noticiero Colorado, as well as the Pascual Boing soft drink workers' strike. The significance of the documentaries lies in the fact that it was the way to communicate with militants from all over the country.

The party only participated in the 1985 Mexican federal elections and its candidates did not win any of the single-member districts, but obtained six seats.

=== Internal Crisis ===
Between 1982 and 1983, an internal conflict arose that concluded with the resignation of the party of the organization secretary Demetrio Vallejo.

With accusations against Vallejo made by the committee was based on that his intervention in the strike of the Pascual soft drink workers affected the party since he excluded the secretary of labor relations since the advisors that he proposed to the union received money from it and they did not deliver it to the party.

Once he was removed from his position, Vallejo announced his resignation from the PMT and his incorporation into the Unified Socialist Party of Mexico along with 250 other militants.

In July 1985, prior to the "First Extraordinary National Plenum" the propaganda secretary, Enrique Laviada Cirerol was removed from office along with three other secretaries resigned from their positions. Those who left the committee argued that democratization of the party was necessary. Already in the plenary session, a critical review of the electoral results of that year was made and it was concluded that it was necessary to deepen alliances with other party organizations, even talking about a merger.

== Dissolution ==
In 1987, in an effort to unify the different leftist forces in Mexico, the PMT and the Unified Socialist Party of Mexico fused and created the new Mexican Socialist Party, which two years later would be the main origin of the Party of the Democratic Revolution.

== See also ==
- Unified Socialist Party of Mexico
- List of political parties in Mexico
- Party of the Democratic Revolution
