= Cuauhtémoc Cárdenas =

Mexican politician (1934–2026)

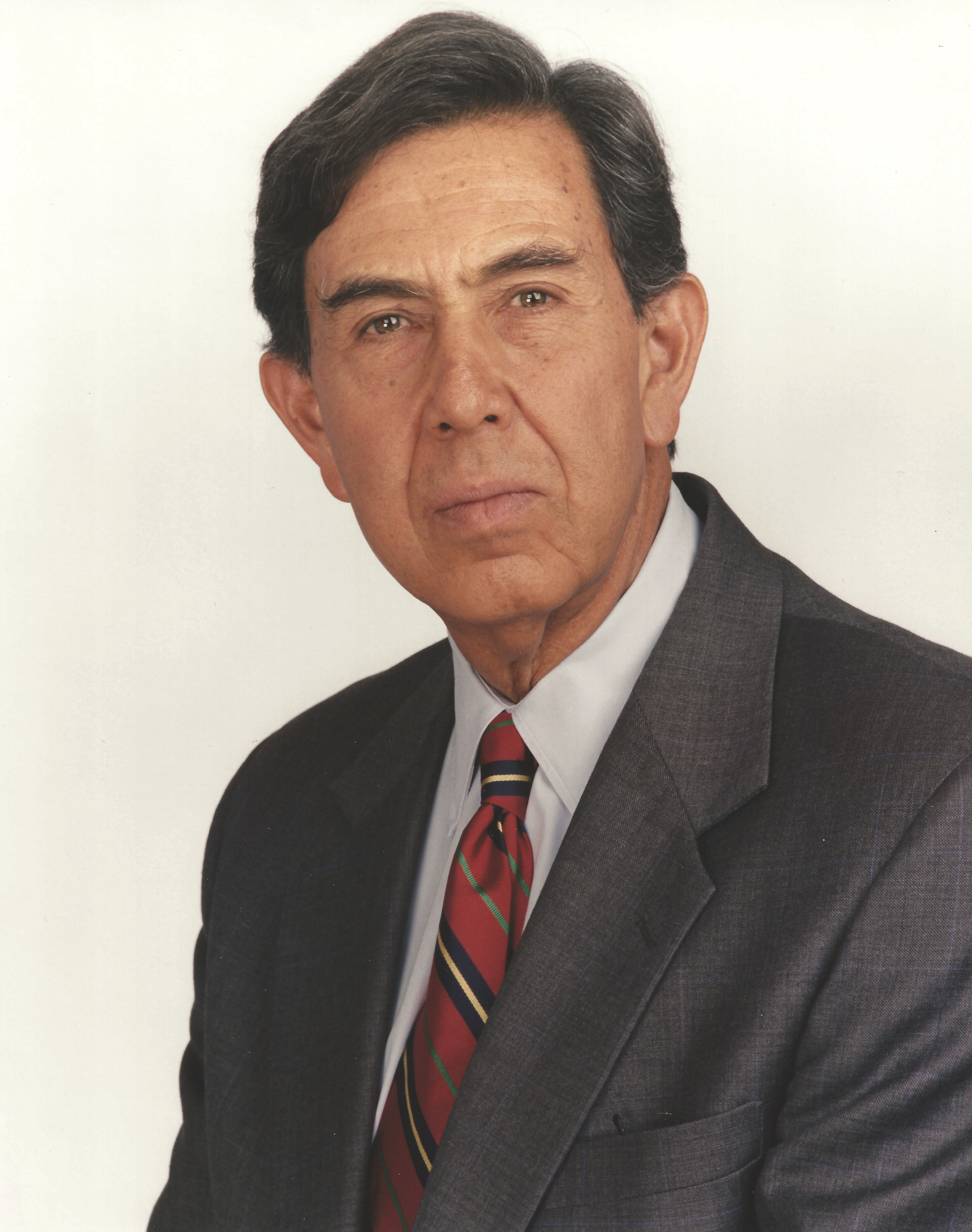
- Cárdenas in 1999

1st Head of Government of Mexico City
- In office 5 December 1997 – 28 September 1999
- Preceded by: Position established
- Succeeded by: Rosario Robles

1st President of the Party of the Democratic Revolution
- In office 5 May 1989 – 14 February 1993
- Preceded by: Position established
- Succeeded by: Roberto Robles Garnica

Governor of Michoacán
- In office 15 September 1980 – 14 September 1986
- Preceded by: Carlos Torres Manzo
- Succeeded by: Luis Martínez Villicaña

Senator of the Republic of Mexico
- In office 1 September 1976 – 15 September 1980
- Preceded by: Norberto Mora Plancarte
- Succeeded by: Antonio Martínez Báez
- Constituency: Michoacán

Personal details
- Born: Cuauhtémoc Cárdenas Solórzano; 1 May 1934 Mexico City, Mexico
- Died: 28 October 2026 (aged 92) Mexico City, Mexico
- Resting place: Panteón Francés de San Joaquín, Mexico City
- Party: Independent (2014–2026)
- Other political affiliations: Party of the Democratic Revolution (1989–2014); Authentic Party of the Mexican Revolution (1987–1989); Institutional Revolutionary Party (1954–1987)
- Spouse: Celeste Batel (m. 1963; died 2021)
- Children: 3, including Lázaro Cárdenas Batel
- Parents: Lázaro Cárdenas del Río (father); Amalia Solórzano (mother)
- Education: National Autonomous University of Mexico (BS)
- Occupation: Politician and civil engineer

Cuauhtémoc Cárdenas Solórzano (Spanish: [kwawˈtemok ˈkaɾðenas]; 1 May 1934 – 28 October 2026) was a Mexican statesman. The son of President Lázaro Cárdenas (1934–1940), he was known for his contributions to the end of single-party rule in Mexico, including his 1988 presidential campaign. Cárdenas was regarded as one of the leading leftist figures in Mexico and in Latin America.

Cárdenas was elected to the Senate for Michoacán in 1976 and was later the Governor of Michoacán from 1980 to 1986, both while representing the Institutional Revolutionary Party (PRI). In 1988, the outgoing President Miguel de la Madrid selected Carlos Salinas de Gortari as the PRI candidate for the 1988 general election in an era when politics were dominated by the party. In opposition to Salinas, Cárdenas and several PRI members joined forces with smaller left-wing parties to form a political movement, the National Democratic Front. During the election, the voting system reportedly crashed while Cárdenas was leading. When the system was restored, Cárdenas had lost that lead and Salinas was declared the winner, sparking accusations of electoral fraud. In 2004, de la Madrid acknowledged the elections were rigged.

In 1989, the National Democratic Front was merged into the Party of the Democratic Revolution (PRD), which Cárdenas co-founded and became its first president. Cárdenas later ran for president in the 1994 and 2000 elections. In 1997, he became the first elected head of government of the Federal District (Mexico City) after reforms granted the city greater autonomy. During his tenure as head of government, he cracked down on corruption, made potable water more accessible, improved the city's infrastructure and addressed inequity. He held the office for nearly two years before resigning to unsuccessfully run for president in 2000.

Through his 1988 presidential campaign and subsequent activities, Cárdenas was credited for leading Mexico toward greater democracy, for ending the PRI's one-party rule and for creating a more competitive political system in the country. Socialist International regarded Cárdenas as "one of the great democratic figures of Mexico and of Latin America".

== Early life and education ==
Cuauhtémoc Cárdenas Solórzano was born in Mexico City on 1 May 1934. He was named after the last Aztec emperor, Cuauhtémoc. He was the only son of Lázaro Cárdenas and Amalia Solórzano; through his father, he had Purépecha ancestry. When he was seven months old, his father was sworn in as President of Mexico. He studied at the Colegio Williams, an all-boys private, secular English-language school located in Mexico City. Cárdenas studied civil engineering at the National Autonomous University of Mexico (UNAM), from where he graduated in 1957.

== Political career ==
=== Early career ===
Cuauhtémoc often served as his father's aide-de-camp in later years, when the former president remained a powerful political figure. Lázaro remained active in Institutional Revolutionary Party (PRI) politics and, with Cuauhtémoc, tried to move the party to a more leftist stance. Both were active in the Movement of National Liberation (Movimiento de Liberación Nacional, MLN), which sought international support for Cuba following its 1959 revolution, as well as to affect domestic politics in Mexico, particularly the need for democracy in the PRI and decentralization of power.

Cuauhtémoc Cárdenas joined the PRI in 1954. In the 1960s, Cárdenas worked in engineering and regional planning, getting involved in the creation of the Balsas River Commission (Comisión del Río Balsas), the Mexican Planning Society (Sociedad Mexicana de Planificación), and the construction of the La Villita Dam between Michoacán and Guerrero.

In 1974, he was a preliminary candidate for governor of Michoacán, but Carlos Torres Manzo was chosen instead. He worked on José López Portillo's presidential campaign ahead of the 1976 election. Cárdenas served as a senator for the state of Michoacán from 1976 to 1980, and as governor of that same state from 1980 to 1986.

=== First presidential campaign (1988) ===
The outgoing president Miguel de la Madrid, a centrist who began policy changes in Mexico that liberalized its economy, designated Carlos Salinas de Gortari as his presidential successor, as was the norm. Salinas, a technocrat with center-right tendencies, caused left-leaning politicians within the PRI to oppose him and to form the Democratic Current (Corriente democrática). Among those involved were Porfirio Muñoz Ledo, Ifigenia Martínez, and Rodolfo González Guevara. They demanded democracy and a return to a more moderate, anti-privatization stance by the PRI. With the official designation of Salinas as the candidate, the Democratic Current were forced out of the PRI. In an interview with historian Enrique Krauze, de la Madrid said "as far as I'm concerned, let them go! Let them form another party." However, it was too late to form a new political party in advance of the July 1988 elections. Instead, they formed the National Democratic Front (Frente Democrático Nacional), a political coalition composed of small left-wing parties supporting Cárdenas as their candidate.

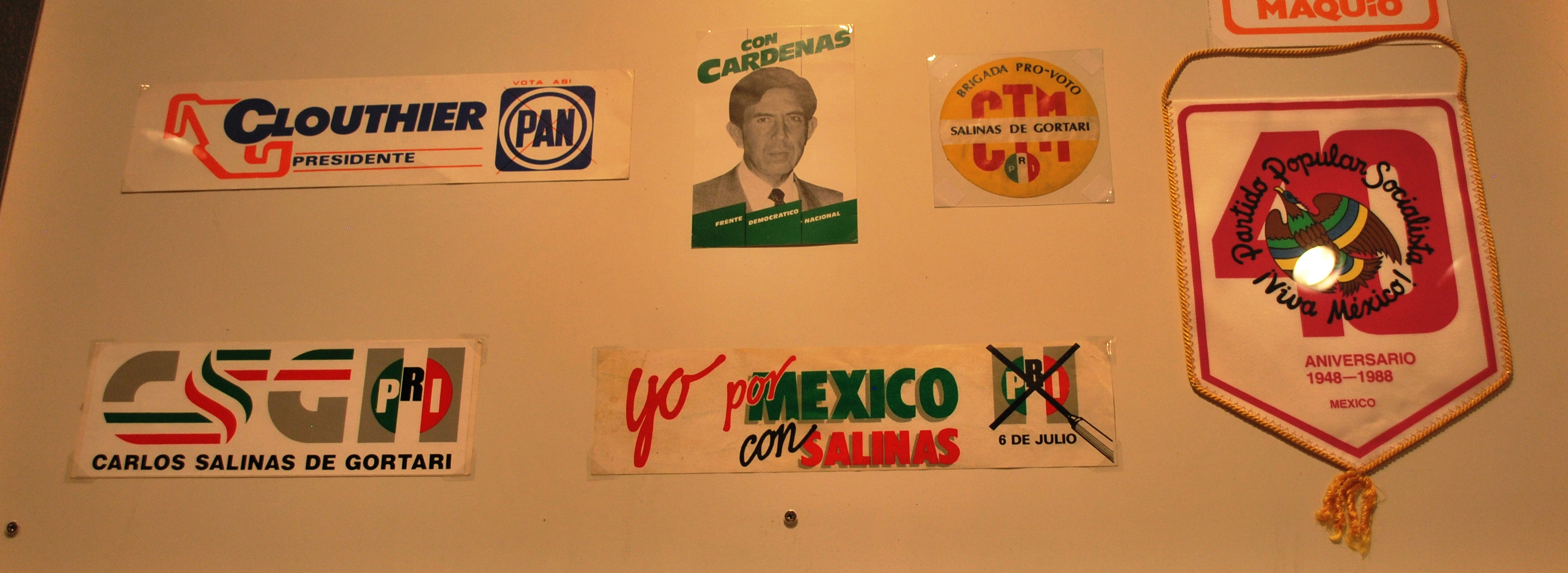
Political campaign items for the 1988 general election. Cárdenas's appears in the upper center

On election day, 6 July 1988, Cárdenas was leading in the vote count when the government's IBM AS/400 computer system allegedly shut down. Manuel Bartlett, Secretary of the Interior and head of the Federal Electoral Commission (CFE), which was responsible for counting the votes, described the incident as a "crash" (se cayó el sistema). When the system was restored, Salinas was declared the official winner. The results became controversial, and the expression se cayó el sistema became an euphemism for electoral fraud. It was the first time in the PRI's 59-year history that its hold on the presidency had been in doubt, making Mexicans aware that the party could lose an election. Although Cárdenas could have incited a revolt, he refused to do so and preferred to let the outcome be decided at the polls. Krauze's assessment is that "an order from [Cárdenas] would have sent Mexico up in flames. But perhaps in memory of his father, the missionary general, a man of strong convictions but not a man of violence, he did the country a great service by sparing it a possible civil war."

In his 2004 autobiography, de la Madrid admitted that the election had been rigged, saying that vote counts were completed at 30,000 polling stations, while results from another 25,000 were not reported individually. Instead, only aggregated results by electoral district were published. This meant that the votes from 45.5% of polling stations were either not counted or counted but not officially reported individually. Additionally, in some rural areas, 100 percent of the votes were counted in favor of the PRI. De la Madrid stated:

The electoral upset was a political earthquake for us [...] As in any emergency, we had to act because the problems were rising fast. There was not a moment for great meditation, we needed agility in our response to consolidate the triumph of the PRI.

On 10 September, the Chamber of Deputies certified the election as valid with 263 votes, 260 of which came from PRI members.

=== Foundation of PRD and second presidential campaign (1989–1994) ===
On 5 May 1989, the National Democratic Front became a national political party, the Party of the Democratic Revolution (PRD). Cárdenas was elected the PRD's first president, running unopposed, and had influence on the Executive Board's composition. In 1990, public discontent forced the PRI to implement various reforms, including the creation of the Federal Electoral Institute (IFE), which, although initially part of the Secretariat of the Interior, was granted full autonomy in regulating elections under the 1996 electoral reform.

The PRD expected Cárdenas would make another run for the presidency in the 1994 presidential election. He placed third, trailing the PRI and National Action Party (PAN) candidates, with 17% of the national vote. The election year was tumultuous, with the rebellion of the Zapatista Army of National Liberation in Chiapas beginning 1 January; the assassination of the PRI candidate Luis Donaldo Colosio in March, and his replacement as presidential candidate by Ernesto Zedillo. Cárdenas's poor showing at the polls may have reflected the Mexican public's desire for stability via the long-time ruling party remaining in office. In Krauze's assessment, "the events in Chiapas probably cost the PRD and its candidate, Cuauhtémoc Cárdenas—who had no involvement with the Zapatista uprising—the votes of many Mexicans uneasy with the return of the past."

=== Head of government of the Federal District and third presidential campaign (1995–2000) ===
In 1995, Cárdenas played a role in the peace negotiations with the Zapatistas. The PRD was also part of the 1996 negotiations between the PRI and the PAN on institutional reforms. In that year, the PRD chose a new party president, Andrés Manuel López Obrador, Cárdenas's ally, who had gone further and sought a political alliance with the Zapatistas.

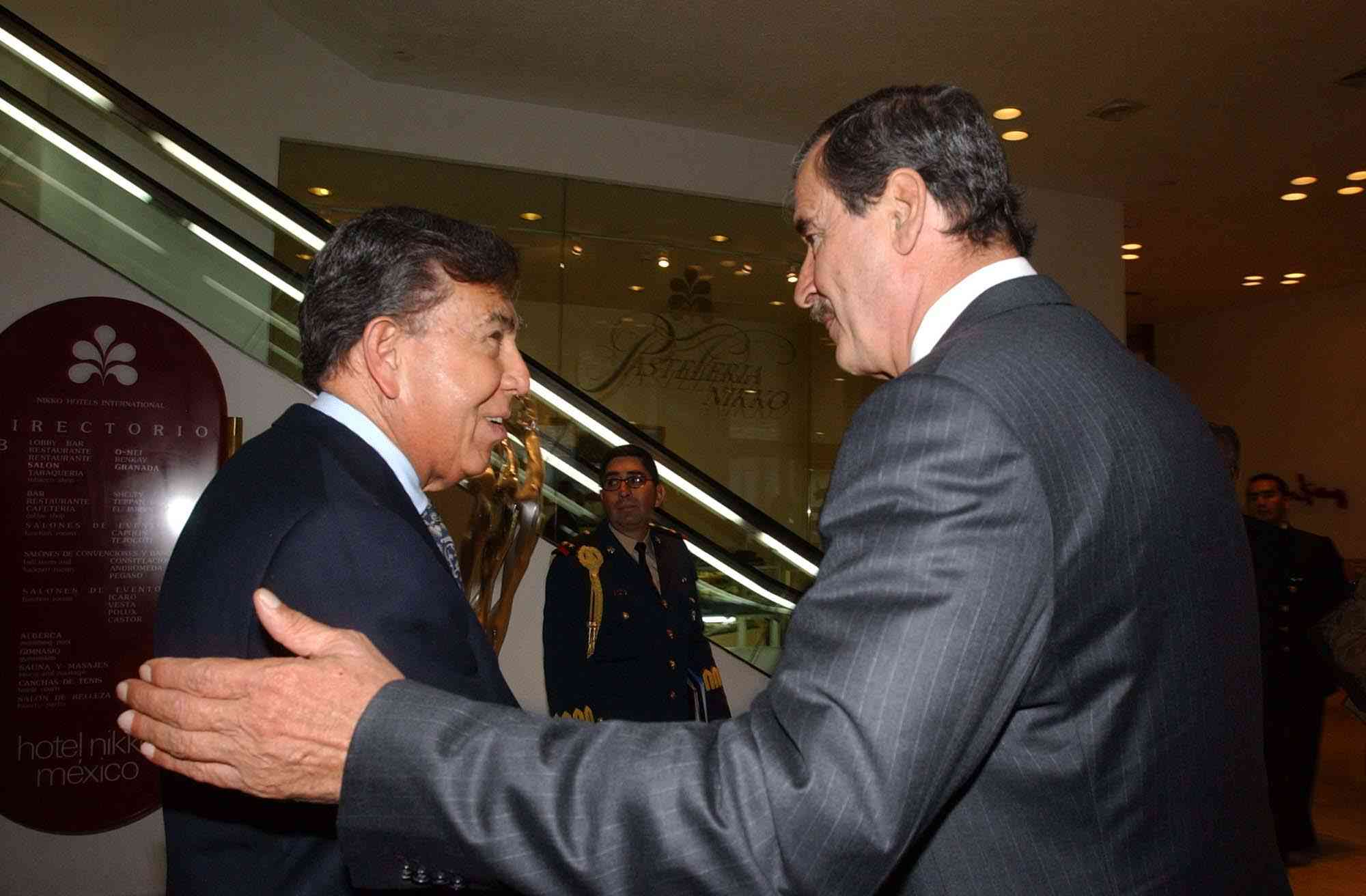
Cárdenas (left) with President Fox in 2004

In 1997, Cárdenas became the PRD's candidate for head of government (jefe de gobierno) of the Federal District, then the legal name for Mexico City. The position was established following reforms that granted the city greater autonomy: previously, the Federal District was governed by a regent appointed by the president. Cárdenas won the election, held on 6 July 1997, with approximately 48 percent of the popular vote, and was sworn in as the first elected head of government of Mexico City on 5 December. As head of government, Cárdenas failed to bring about substantial changes or curb numerous challenges which plagued the city. His tenure as head of government was noted for combating corruption and for addressing the city's infrastructure and social inequity. He oversaw the arrest of more than 1,200 judicial agents and dismissed and prosecuted 800 police officers as part of his effort to crack down on corruption. In a 2000 interview with The Los Angeles Times, Cárdenas noted that in 1999, there were no bank robberies compared with 200 during the same period in 1998. He also highlighted how he was able to make potable water accessible in the city and set up offices across the city to assist women and children who were on the streets.

Cárdenas resigned from the position in 1999 to run for the presidency in the 2000 elections, leaving Rosario Robles as his interim successor.

His 2000 campaign was described as "bleak" by The Los Angeles Times due to constantly falling in third place in polling numbers leading up to the election. Cárdenas ended up placing third with around 16% of the vote, while PAN candidate Vicente Fox won the election, ending the PRI's uninterrupted hold on the presidency since 1929. Although Cárdenas never served as president, his democratic actions earned him credit for the PRI's defeat and the country's democratic transition.

=== Departure from PRD and final years ===
On 25 November 2014, Cárdenas announced that he was leaving the PRD. He had been a longtime senior member of the PRD and was considered the 'moral leader' of the party. Many in Mexico saw his departure from the PRD as a product of the party's internal fighting and mounting identity crisis.

Following his departure from the PRD, Cárdenas organized a political project named Por México Hoy (For Mexico Today), which aimed to address social anger to change the country's constitution. In 2017, he was named Honorary President of the Socialist International during a conference in Cartagena, Colombia.

After the Morena Party won the presidency and the legislature in 2018 and 2024, Cárdenas criticized the party for being "insufficiently leftist" and for its failure to carry out a fiscal overhaul to improve public education and the health system and to reduce economic inequality.

== Personal life ==
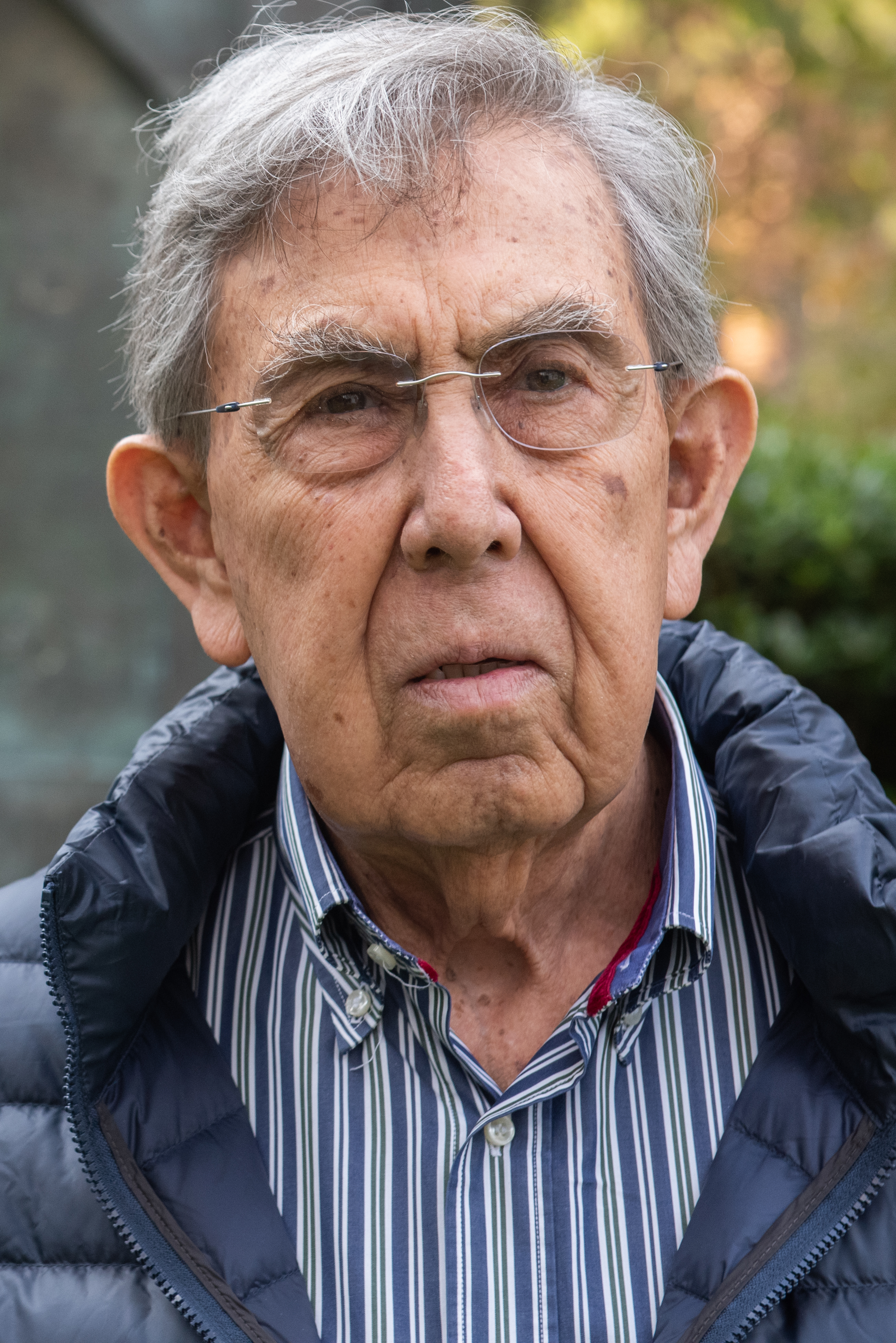
Cárdenas in 2022

Cárdenas married Celeste Batel in 2 April 1963 and they had three children: Cuauhtémoc, Camila, and Lázaro. Lázaro Cárdenas Batel subsequently served as Governor of Michoacán and as Chief of Staff for President Claudia Sheinbaum.

Celeste Batel died on 19 October 2021, on the 51st anniversary of her father-in-law's death.

=== Health and death ===
Cárdenas tested positive for COVID-19 on 12 September 2020.

On 10 July 2026, Cárdenas attended a tribute to his mother at the Congress of Michoacán, where he was seen leaning on two canes and appearing thin and stooped. On 10 August, he gave his final interview to Miguel Ángel Mancera on his podcast. In September 2026, he cancelled a planned appearance honoring his father due to ill health.

Cárdenas died on the evening of 28 October 2026, at the Hospital Ángeles Metropolitano in Colonia Roma, Mexico City. He was 92.

His state funeral was held on 30 October at the Palace of Fine Arts in Mexico City. President Claudia Sheinbaum, several government ministers and Head of Government of Mexico City Clara Brugada attended the funeral. He was interred at the Panteón Francés de San Joaquín next to his wife.

== Legacy ==
Following his death, The New York Times credited Cárdenas for ending a "one-party rule" in Mexico while calling him a leading figure in the country's democratic transformation. He was also noted as a leading figure in left-wing politics in Latin America, with The New York Times also calling him a "leftist symbol" in Latin America. Socialist International regarded Cárdenas as "one of the great democratic figures of Mexico and of Latin America".

In their obituary of him, Reuters said that Cárdenas was an "icon" of the Mexican left who was able to force changes in the political system despite never winning the presidency. Bloomberg News also said that he was a "key figure" in the country's democracy and a "towering figure" in Mexican politics. He was called a "historic politician" by the Associated Press and one of Mexico's most important modern political voices. The International Business Times said that Cárdenas "reshaped" left-wing politics in Mexico and was the most influential leaders in the country's modern political opposition. The Wall Street Journal said that Cárdenas helped "pave the way" for Mexico's democracy and his 1988 presidential campaign helped establish a "competitive" political system in Mexico by ending the PRI's one-party rule.

President Claudia Sheinbaum said that Cárdenas brought a "demand for change from millions of Mexicans" and helped transform national political life. She also noted Cárdenas's "fundamental" role in Mexico's contemporary history. Former President Andres Manuel López Obrador described Cárdenas as a "precursor of the modern democratic opposition". President of Brazil Luiz Inácio Lula da Silva said that Cárdenas played a "key role" in the fight for Mexico's sovereignty and social equity. Lula da Silva also said that Cárdenas helped open the way for a generation of leaders in Latin America and fought for a "developed, just and free Latin America". U.S. Representative Chuy García also noted that Cárdenas "changed the course of Mexican history" during his political career.

A 2016 El País article covering Cárdenas's response to Donald Trump's election as U.S. president referred to him as the "last remaining patriarch of Mexico's political left".

== Accolades ==
In 2011, Cárdenas Solórzano received the Senate's Belisario Domínguez Medal of Honor. The following year, the Mexico City Metro named one of its FE-10 trains after Cárdenas. The National Polytechnic Institute (IPN) awarded him an honorary doctorate in January 2026 in recognition of his contributions to democracy. Two months later, Pemex offered him a consulting position.

Political offices
Preceded by position established	Head of government of the Federal District; 1997–1999	Succeeded by Rosario Robles
Party political offices
Preceded by position established	President of the Party of the Democratic Revolution; 1989–1993	Succeeded by Roberto Robles Garnica
Preceded by none	Party of the Democratic Revolution nominee for President of Mexico; 1988, 1994, 2000	Succeeded by Andrés Manuel López Obrador
Awards
Preceded by Luis H. Álvarez	Recipient of the Belisario Domínguez Medal of Honor; 2011	Succeeded by Ernesto de la Peña
