= Esperanza López Mateos =

Mexican translator, political activist and mountaineer

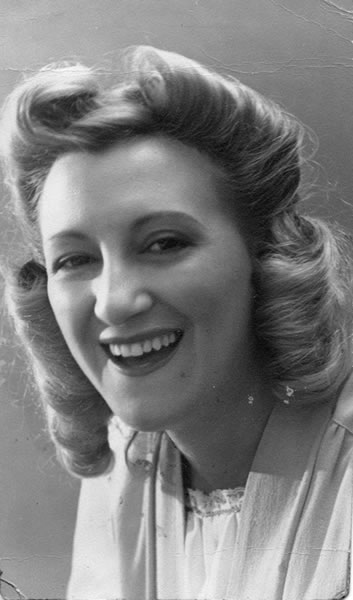
- Picture taken in a photo studio. 1943 or earlier, The exact date is unknown, although the hairstyle places it in the 1940s.
- Born: January 8, 1907; Mexico City, Mexico
- Died: September 19, 1951 (aged 44); Mexico City, Mexico
- Occupations: Translator, political activist, syndicalist, mountaineer, literary agent
- Spouse: Roberto Figueroa

Esperanza López Mateos (January 8, 1907 – September 19, 1951) was a Mexican translator, political activist, syndicalist, and mountaineer. She translated several of B. Traven's novels and was his literary agent in Latin America from 1941 to 1951. She was the sister of politician Adolfo López Mateos and sister-in-law of cinematographer Gabriel Figueroa. She participated in the strike by the miners of Nueva Rosita (1950–1951) and worked with Vicente Lombardo Toledano; together they supported many Jewish exiles fleeing European wars and seeking refuge in Mexico.

== Birth and early years ==
Esperanza López Mateos was born in Mexico City on January 8, 1907. According to her baptismal certificate dated January 19, 1907 at the church of San Cosmas, the girl María Esperanza Adolfina Mateos is the natural daughter of Elena Mateos. The name of her father is not mentioned. These dates are consistent with those of her birth certificate, in which her name only appears as Esperanza Mateos, natural daughter of Elena Mateos. The baptismal certificate of her half-brother Rafael Fernando López Mateos, born March 12, 1904, states that at that time Elena Mateos was a widow and Rafael Fernando was the son of her late husband Mariano Gerardo López; the vital records reveal that the father's death date was the same as the son's birthdate. The latter died a year later, on April 27, 1905. Regina Santiago argues that the father of Esperanza and her younger brother Adolfo was Gonzalo de Murga. In either case, Esperanza and Adolfo took the name of Elena's late husband, Mariano López. This marriage produced two older sons, Mariano (born 1900) and Elena.

Esperanza's illegitimate birth gave rise to many legends to protect the reputation of Elena and her two minor children, Esperanza and Adolfo. According to a story told by Gabriel Figueroa in his Memorias, the Spanish Gonzalo de Murga had a daughter with an aristocratic English woman who left him; he later entrusted this child to Elena Mateos, who named her Esperanza.

The children grew up in close contact with their cousins, Gabriel and Roberto Figueroa Mateos. In 1934 Esperanza married Roberto Figueroa. In her youth, she and her brother Adolfo participated in the vasconcelista movement of 1929. From a very young age, Esperanza and Adolfo became addicted to mountaineering. In Iztaccihuatl there is a mountain hut named for Esperanza.

Esperanza studied nursing and also was a parliamentary stenographer. She held many different jobs, but during the 1930s went to work at the Secretariat of Public Education. There she met many intellectuals of German origin who had come to Mexico to escape the Nazis, as well as Mexican intellectuals who sought to transform education to counteract the power of the Catholic Church. She also met Vicente Lombardo Toledano, with whom she collaborated for many years. Between April and June 1938, Esperanza provided shorthand transcription for a fine arts conference organized by the anti-Nazi Liga pro-Cultura Alemana en México (Pro-German Culture League in Mexico).

== Translations ==
On August 8, 1939, Esperanza wrote a letter to Alfred A. Knopf, editor of the work of B. Traven in English, requesting the film rights to two Traven novels, The Bridge in the Jungle and The Rebellion of the Hanged. Although Traven refused at first, Esperanza insisted and sent her translation of The Bridge in the Jungle to persuade him. Traven was very pleased and named her his representative for Latin America. From then on she worked as Traven's secretary, translator, and agent. For years the copyright of his books was held in the names of Esperanza and Josef Wieder.

In 1941, Puente en la selva (The Bridge in the Jungle) appeared, published by A. P. Márquez. This was the first Spanish translation authorized by Traven, completed by Esperanza López Mateos. In the following years she translated the following B. Traven books from English to Spanish:

- El tesoro de Sierra Madre (The Treasure of the Sierra Madre) (1946)
- Una canasta de cuentos mexicanos (Canasta of Mexican Stories) (1946)
- La carreta (The Carreta) (1949)
- La rebelión de los colgados (The Rebellion of the Hanged) (1950)
- El barco de la muerte (The Death Ship) (1950)
- Gobierno (Government) (1951)
- La rosa blanca (The White Rose) (1951)

In addition, during World War II, she translated some of Traven's political articles that appeared in various magazines. In 1946, journalist Antonio Rodríguez published a series of articles in the magazine Mañana which asserted that Esperanza López Mateos was the true author of the novels of B. Traven. Also, on March 10, 1947, Life magazine published a short article titled "Who is Bruno Traven?", signed by William W. Johnson, which included a photograph of Esperanza and a brief interview with her.

== Years of maturity ==
In June 1941 Esperanza met Henry Schnautz, one of Trotsky's guards, with whom she began a romantic relationship. Although the relationship was very troubled and broke up several times, it continued until Esperanza's death. Schnautz left Mexico in February 1943. In that same year, Ediciones Tempestad, a company in which Traven and Esperanza were partners, published La carta y el recuerdo (The Letter and the Memory) by Esperanza López Mateos.

In November 1947, she traveled to New York, where she met with Henry Schnautz. From there she went to Europe, acting as a representative of B. Traven in Switzerland, France, Czechoslovakia, and Italy. She met with Josef Wieder (Traven's agent) in Zürich and visited Davos before returning to New York. Gabriel Figueroa stated that the purpose of this trip was to raise funds (especially among Jewish New Yorkers) to build a boat called Exodus which would transport a group of Jewish refugees to Israel. Later, the Mexican Jewish community built a school that bears the name of Esperanza López Mateos, as a gesture of appreciation for her work on behalf of refugees.

In 1948 she participated with Vicente Lombardo Toledano in the foundation of the Partido Popular (later the Popular Socialist Party).

In June 1948 Esperanza began a painful spinal treatment to recover from the aftermath of an alpine accident while descending the Iztaccihuatl volcano. She underwent an operation, then spent ten weeks in the hospital and several weeks in bed after that.

On August 7, 1948, Luis Spota published an article in the magazine Mañana, in which he identified Traven as Berick Traven Torsvan, owner of the Parque Cachú in Acapulco. The interviewee refused to accept this identification with the writer.

== Participation in the Nueva Rosita strike ==
On October 16, 1950, a strike broke out among miners of Nueva Rosita against Mexicana Zinc & Co., a subsidiary of the American Smelting and Refining Company (ASARCO). Shortly thereafter, Esperanza traveled to Nueva Rosita to deliver funds raised by the Comité de Defensa y Solidaridad con las Huelgas Mineras (Committee of Defense and Solidarity with the Miners' Strike), led by Felipe Sánchez Acevedo, Ángel Bassols Batalla, and herself in Mexico City. Just two days before the strike began, Esperanza wrote to Henry Schnautz that she could walk perfectly; she told him that she was working "like a demon to earn our daily bread."

In Nueva Rosita, Esperanza faced Pliego Garduño, commander in charge of the militarized zone. He was intimidated and forced to leave Coahuila. The miners decided to walk to Mexico City to demand their rights, and organized the "Marcha del Hambre" (Hunger March), which arrived in the capital on March 10, 1951. Esperanza put up the women in her own house. Meanwhile, the majority of the miners stayed at the Deportivo 18 de Marzo sports complex. President Alemán declined to meet with the miners, and in early April the strike was declared non-existent.

== Death ==
Esperanza López Mateos died on September 19, 1951. Her body was found by her husband, Roberto Figueroa. She was in her bedroom with a bullet in her head. In Elena Poniatowska's interview with the family of Gabriel Figueroa, they argue that it was a suicide caused by conditions that Esperanza suffered from following her accident. However they also reported that according to José Álvarez Amézquita, the doctor who attended Esperanza and prepared the death certificate, she was shot in the neck. The doctor echoed rumors of suspicions that Esperanza had been assassinated, as had some leaders of the miners' strike. The death certificate only lists the cause of death as "wound caused by a firearm projectile".

== Books about Esperanza López Mateos ==
- Otra máscara de Esperanza by Adriana González Mateos, a novel based on the life of Esperanza López Mateos (Editorial Océano, Hotel de las Letras, 2014)
