= Rose symbolism =

Symbol

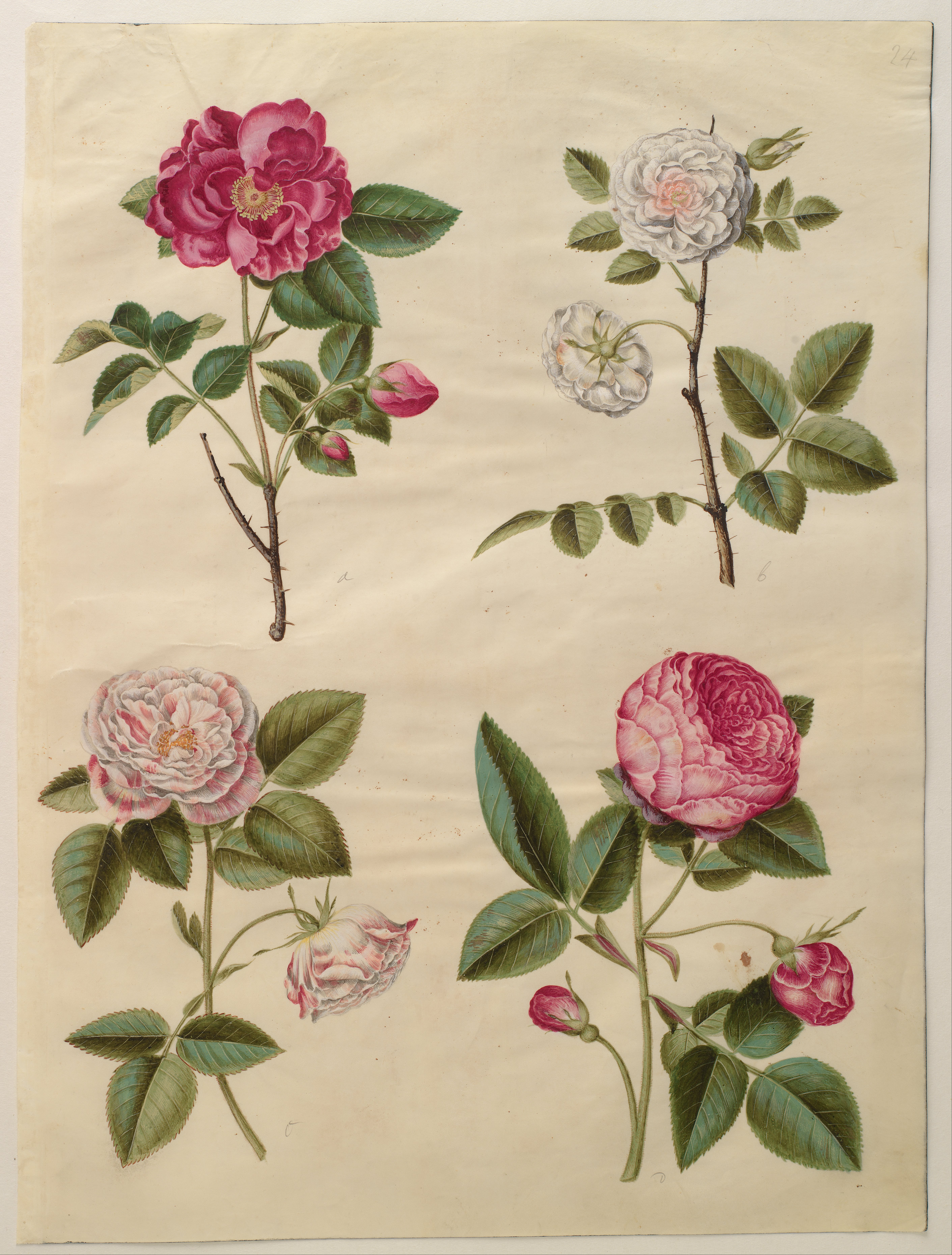
Hans Simon Holtzbecker: Rosa gallica, gouache, c. 1650 (Statens Museum for Kunst, Copenhagen). The vivid red, semi-double Rosa gallica was "the ancestor of all the roses of medieval Europe".

Various folk cultures and traditions assign symbolic meaning to the rose, though these are seldom understood in-depth. Examples of deeper meanings lie within the language of flowers, and how a rose may have a different meaning in arrangements. Examples of common meanings of different coloured roses are: true love (red), mystery (blue), innocence or purity (white), death (black), friendship (yellow), and passion (orange).

== In religion ==
=== Greco-Roman religion ===
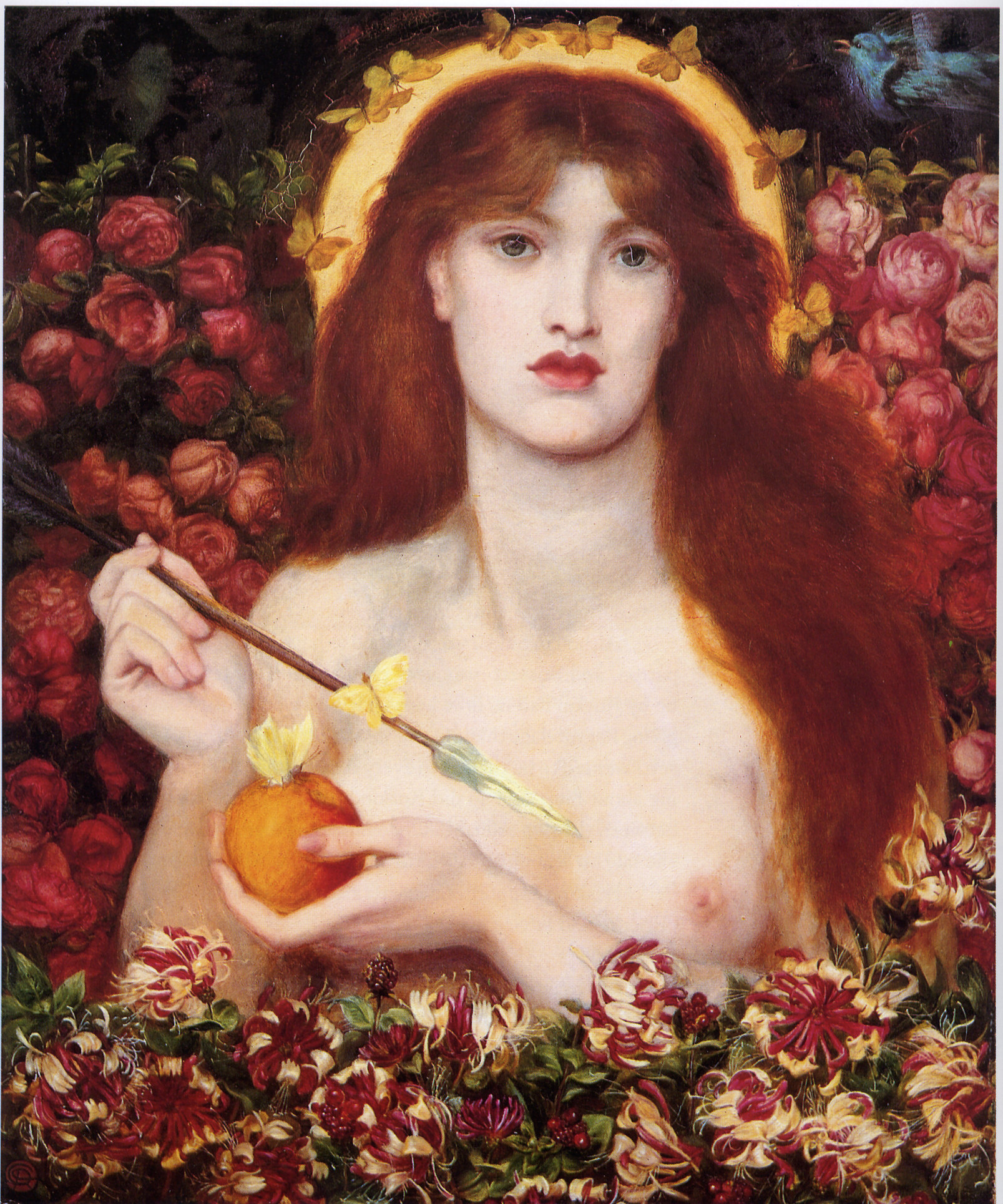
Venus Verticordia (1868) by Dante Gabriel Rossetti, showing the goddess Aphrodite surrounded by red roses

In ancient Greece, the rose was closely associated with the goddess Aphrodite. In the Iliad, Aphrodite protects the body of Hector using the "immortal oil of the rose" and the archaic Greek lyric poet Ibycus praises a beautiful youth saying that Aphrodite nursed him "among rose blossoms". The second-century AD Greek travel writer Pausanias associates the rose with the story of Adonis Book Eleven of the ancient Roman novel The Golden Ass by Apuleius contains a scene in which the goddess Isis, who is identified with Venus, instructs the main character, Lucius, who has been transformed into a donkey, to eat rose petals from a crown of roses worn by a priest as part of a religious procession in order to regain his humanity.

=== Judaism ===
In the Song of Songs 2:1-2, the Jewish people are compared with a rose, remaining beautiful amongst thorns, although some translations instead refer to a "lily among thorns." The Zohar uses a "thirteen-petalled rose" as a symbol for the thirteen attributes of Divine Mercy named in Exodus 34:6-7. The rose and rosettes were also used to symbolize royalty and Israel, and were used in wreaths for the bridegroom at weddings in Biblical times.

=== Christianity ===
Following the Christianization of the Roman Empire, the rose became identified with the Virgin Mary. The rose symbol eventually led to the creation of the rosary and other devotional prayers in Christianity. Ever since the 1400s, the Franciscans have had a Crown Rosary of the Seven Joys of the Blessed Virgin Mary. In the 1400s and 1500s, the Carthusians promoted the idea of sacred mysteries associated with the rose symbol and rose gardens. Albrecht Dürer's painting The Feast of the Rosary (1506) depicts the Virgin Mary distributing garlands of roses to worshippers. The Rose Cross incorporates the flower directly into the Christian cross, and is the namesake of the esoteric religious order of Rosicrucianism.

=== Islam ===
The cultivation of geometrical gardens, in which the rose has often held pride of place, has a long history in Iran and surrounding lands. In the lyric ghazal, it is the beauty of the rose that provokes the longing song of the nightingale – an image prominent, for example, in the poems of Hafez.

In turn, the imagery of lover and beloved became a type of the Sufi mystic's quest for divine love, so that Ibn Arabi, for example, aligns the rose with the beloved's blushing cheek on the one hand and, on the other, with the divine names and attributes.

Other well-known examples of rose symbolism in Sufism include:

- The Sufi master Jilani is known as "the Rose of Baghdad" and his order, the Qadiriyya, uses the rose as its symbol.
- Two prominent books aligned with Sufism are The Rose Garden by Saadi and Mahmud Shabistari's The Rose Garden of Secrets.

== In Europe ==
=== England ===
The Tudor rose

The rose as a heraldic symbol: the coat of arms of Ružomberok in Slovakia. The town's name in literal translation is "Hill of roses".

The rose is the national flower of England, a usage dating back to the English civil wars of the fifteenth century (later called Wars of the Roses), in which a red rose represented the House of Lancaster, and a white rose represented the House of York. The Tudor dynasty created the Tudor rose, which united both the white and the red roses, a symbolism dramatized by Shakespeare in his play Richard III. The traditional ballad "The Rose of England" (Child 166) recounts the seizure of the crown by Earl of Richmond (who became Henry VII of England, the founder of the Tudor dynasty), using the "red rose" as an allegory for Henry.

Of the approximately 775 mentions of plants and spices in his works, William Shakespeare refers to the rose most frequently, about 100 times.

The England national rugby union team and Rugby Football Union adopted the red rose as their symbol in 1871, and the rose has appeared on players' kit ever since.

The red rose is the symbol for the UK Labour Party.

=== Spain ===
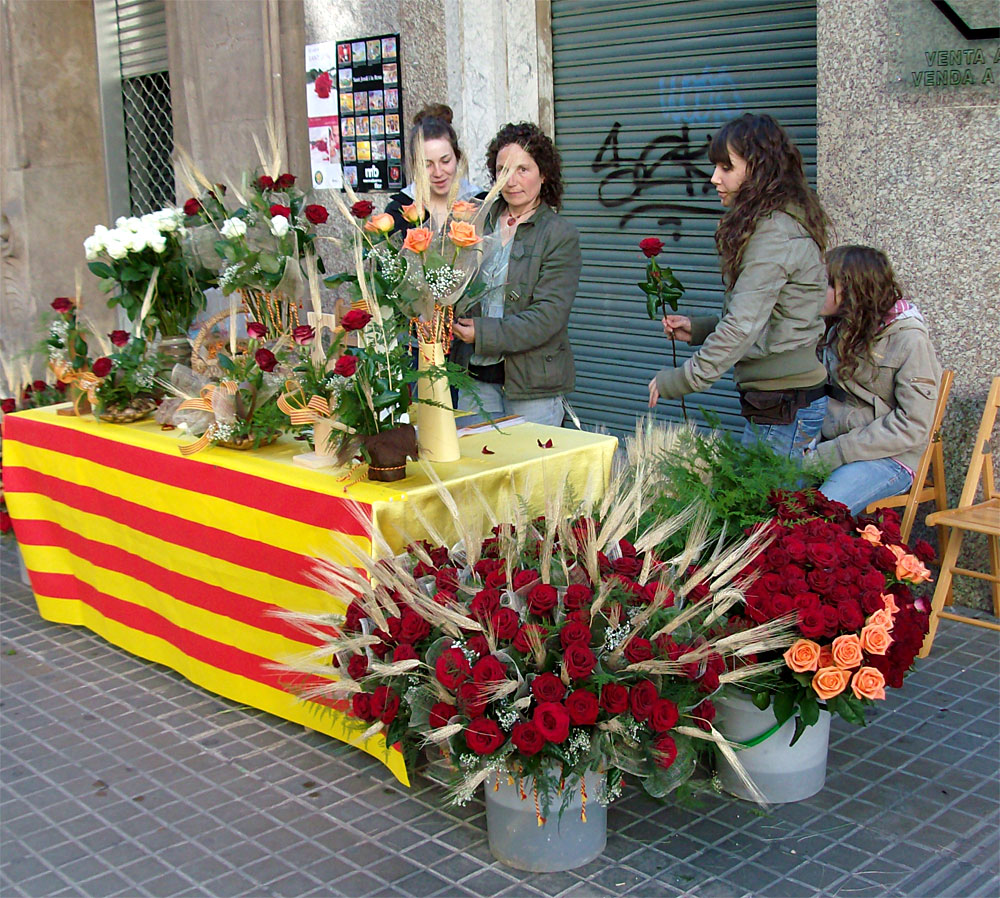
Selling roses on St George's Day in Catalonia, Spain

Catalans in the north eastern of Spain have traditionally celebrated Saint George's Day (April 23) – which commemorates Saint George (Sant Jordi), the patron saint of the Catalonia region; as the dia dels enamorats ("lovers' day"), on which lovers exchange blood-red roses.

== In North America ==
=== United States ===
In 1986, the rose was adopted as the national floral emblem of the United States.

It is the state flower of five U.S. states and the District of Columbia.

- Iowa: The wild rose was adopted as the state's flower in 1896.
- North Dakota: The wild prairie rose was adopted as the official state flower of North Dakota in 1907. The colors of the rose (green and pink) had previously been adopted by the first graduating class of the University of North Dakota in 1889.
- Georgia: The Cherokee rose (R. laevigata) was adopted as the state's official floral emblem in 1916.
- New York: In 1955, the state adopted the rose as the state flower; the legislation stated: "The rose shall be the official flower of the state in any color or combination of colors common to it."
- Oklahoma: In 2004, Oklahoma adopted a new cultivar named Oklahoma rose as state flower.

Portland, Oregon has counted "City of Roses" among its nicknames (see roses in Portland, Oregon) since 1888, and has held an annual Rose Festival since 1905. The city is also known for its International Rose Test Garden.

Pasadena, California – also nicknamed the "City of Roses" – has held the annual Tournament of Roses Parade since 1890, and 1902 the Parade has been held in conjunction with the Rose Bowl Game (which is now played at the city's Rose Bowl stadium, built in 1922).

In April 2011, the U.S. government's space program agency, the National Aeronautics and Space Administration (NASA), celebrated the Hubble Space Telescope's 21st anniversary by releasing an image of spiral galaxies Arp 273 positioned in a rose-like shape.

The red rose is also part of the official logo of the Democratic Socialists of America (DSA), being a symbol of socialism generally.

=== Canada ===
In 1930, Rosa acicularis (the wild rose or prickly rose) was adopted as the official provincial flower of the Canadian province of Alberta. The suggestion that a provincial floral emblem be adopted by first made by an Edmonton newspaper editor; "the Women's Institutes took up the suggestion and passed it on to the Department of Education, and the province's schoolchildren made the final choice."

The Wildrose Party, a now-defunct Albertan political party, was named after the province's official flower.

=== Mexico ===
The Mexican city of Guadalajara, the capital of Jalisco, is nicknamed the "City of Roses" (Ciudad de las Rosas).

== Socialism ==
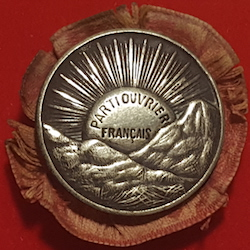
Badge of French Workers Party (Parti Ouvrier Francais) with rising sun on a red rosette background, 1893

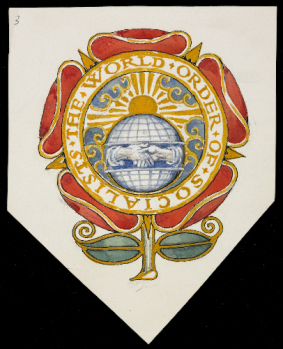
Emblem for "The World Order of Socialists" with a red rose, substituting the shield of arms, containing a handshake stretching a rationally devised globe under a rising sun, designed by Walter Crane, c. 1915

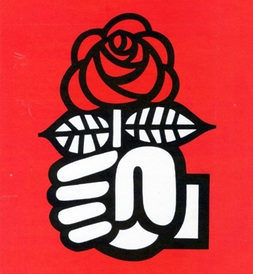
The original version of the fist and rose emblem drawn in 1969 in the French Socialist Party.

Since the 1880s, the red rose has been a symbol of socialism. The origin of the rose as a symbol of socialism relates to its association with the color red. Since at least 1848, red was associated with socialism. Following the French Revolution of 1848, the socialists pushed to have the revolution's red flag be designated the national flag. The republicans, however, prevailed and the French tricolor flag remained the national flag. The provisional government as a compromise decreed that: "As a sign of rallying and as a remembrance of recognition for the last act of the popular revolution, members of the provisional government and other authorities will wear the red rosette, which will also be placed at the flagstaff."

During the Paris Commune in 1871, the red flag solidified its link with socialism when it flew as the flag of the Communards' short-lived government. Following the collapse of the Paris Commune, German Chancellor Bismarck out of fear of the growing strength of the socialists in Germany had parliament pass the Anti-Socialist laws to suppress the activities of the Social Democratic Party. As part of the Anti-Socialist laws in 1878, the display of emblems of the Social Democratic Party were banned. To circumvent the law, social democrats wore red bits of ribbons in their buttonholes. These actions, however, led to arrest and jail sentences. Subsequently, red rosebuds were substituted by social democrats. These actions also led to arrest and jail sentences. The judge ruled that in general everyone has a right to wear any flower as suits their taste, but when socialists as a group wear red rosebuds, it becomes a party emblem.

Due to the Anti-Socialist laws, which banned social democratic activities, hundreds of socialists were fined, imprisoned, or exiled from Germany. Subsequently, the German exiles spread the red rose symbol of socialism across Europe and to the United States. The socialist Johann Most was one of these German socialist exiles, who first went to England, and then later went to the United States and carried the red rosebud symbol with him. The red rosebud was worn in his lapel in 1887 during speeches he gave in support of the eight individuals convicted in the Haymarket Affair in a sign of socialist solidarity. Similarly, the wearing of a red flower, such as a red carnation or red rose, became common during the commemoration ceremonies in France at the Communards' Wall which remembered the victims of the collapse of the Paris Commune. By the 1910s, the red rose was universally identified as a symbol of the socialist movement.

The Tamiment Library and Robert F. Wagner Archives at New York University states that the rose "has always been an important symbol with anti-authoritarian associations." The rose is used to show the end after the means, meaning "lay a rose on the grave". The rose symbol became popular as a political logo among socialist and social democratic political parties in post-World War II Western Europe. The fist and rose, in which the rose is held by a clenched fist, is used by the Socialist International "and many of its member parties". The French Socialist Party (PS) was the first party to adopt it in 1971, using imagery popular with left-wing movements of the era. Centre-leaning and moderate parties tend to use a red rose alone, doing away with the revolutionary heritage of the raised fist. The British Labour Party has used a red rose as its symbol since the late 1980s; the rose replaced the party's previous symbol, the red flag.

== Allegorically in literature ==
The rose in an allegorical sense appears many times in literature. In William Blake's poem "The Sick Rose" the rose is a symbol for love or passion, it is crimson and dark but now sick, the worm has infected it. The rose in the popular 13th-century French poem "Romance of the Rose" is a personification of the woman, the object of the lover's attentions, and his plucking of the rose represents his conquest of her. In the title of William Faulkner's short story "A Rose for Emily" the rose has a number of possible meanings: as Emily's lover now dried and preserved, or a secret as per sub rosa. In a postscript to The Name of the Rose, Umberto Eco discusses the reason behind the title to his 1983 novel: "because the rose is a symbolic figure so rich in meanings that by now it hardly has any meaning left".

== Relationships ==
The term bara (薔薇), "rose" in Japanese, has historically been used in Japan as a pejorative for men who love men, roughly equivalent to the English language term "pansy". Beginning in the 1960s, the term was reappropriated by Japanese gay media: notably with the 1961 anthology Ba-ra-kei: Ordeal by Roses, a collection of semi-nude photographs of homosexual writer Yukio Mishima by photographer Eikoh Hosoe, and later with Barazoku (薔薇族; lit. "rose tribe") in 1971, the first commercially produced gay magazine in Asia. The use of the rose as a prominent symbol of love between males is supposedly derived from the Greek myth of King Laius having affairs with boys under rose trees. Since the 2000s, bara has been used by non-Japanese audience as an umbrella term to describe a wide variety of Japanese and non-Japanese gay media featuring love and sex between masculine men. The rose is also the sacred flower of Eros, the Greek god of love and sex, and patron of love between men. Eros was responsible for the first rose to sprout on Earth, followed by every flower and herb. Roses are a symbol of pederasty in ancient Greece: handsome boys were metaphorically called roses by their male admirers in homoerotic poems such as those by Solon, Straton, Meleager, Rhianus, and Philostratos.

As opposed to the red rose and its association with romantic affection, giving someone a yellow rose is symbolic of platonic love. Because of this, yellow roses have also become popular as symbols of aromantic people.

A red rose is a gift primarily given to a love interest, symbolizing a marital or romantic relationship. Wedding bouquets often include white roses, symbolizing virtue. Red is traditionally seen as a symbol of passion, while white is a symbol of purity and innocence.

== Other ==
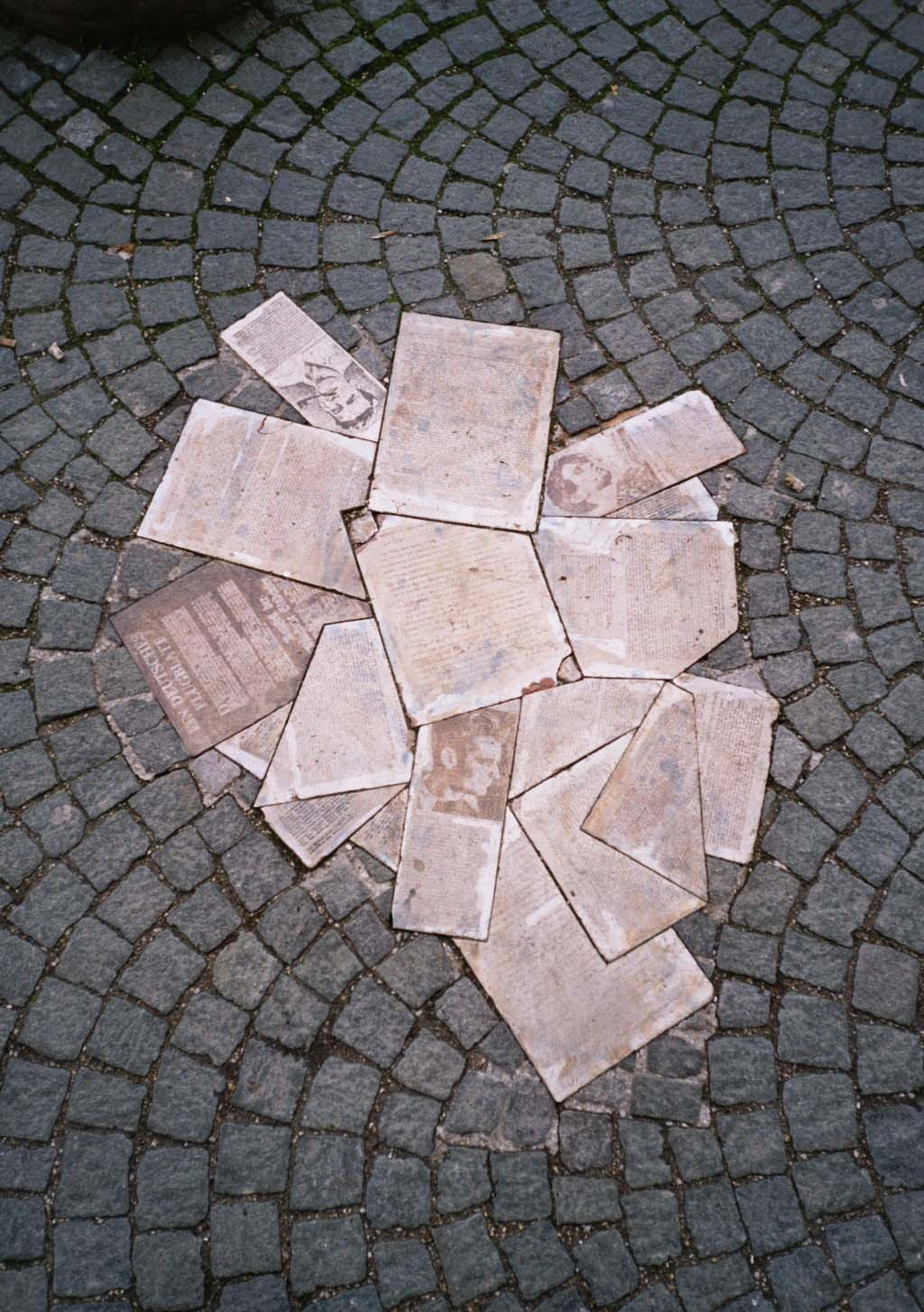
Monument to the "Weiße Rose".

The "White Rose" (German die Weiße Rose) was a World War II non-violent intellectual resistance group in the Third Reich led by a group of students and a professor at LMU Munich. The group conducted an anonymous leaflet and graffiti campaign that called for active opposition to the Nazi party regime. Their activities started in Munich on 27 June 1942, and ended with the arrest of the core group by the Gestapo on 18 February 1943.

Under Gestapo interrogation, Hans Scholl gave several explanations for the origin of the name "The White Rose," and suggested he may have chosen it while he was under the emotional influence of a 19th-century poem with the same name by German poet Clemens Brentano. It was also speculated that the name might have been taken from either the Cuban poet, Jose Marti's verse "Cultivo una rosa blanca" or a German novel Die Weiße Rose (The White Rose), written by B. Traven, the German author of The Treasure of the Sierra Madre. Hans Scholl and Alex Schmorell had read this novel. They also wrote that the symbol of the white rose was intended to represent purity and innocence in the face of evil.

== See also ==
- Black rose symbolism – fictional symbol with different meanings
- Bread and Roses – a political slogan as well as the name of an associated poem and song
- Christmas rose – common name for some flowering plants
- The Rose Cross – western esoteric symbol
- Sub rosa – phrase meaning secrecy
- Language of flowers – cryptological communication through the use or arrangement of flowers
- List of plants with symbolism
- Rose (heraldry) – often used both as a charge on a coat of arms and by itself as an heraldic badge
- Category:Coats of arms with roses
