= Traven =

- B. Traven (Bruno Traven in some accounts), a pseudonymous novelist, whose most famous book was The Treasure of the Sierra Madre (1927)
- Roberto Traven (born 1968), retired Brazilian mixed martial artist
