= B. Traven: A Vision of Mexico =

1992 book by Heidi Zogbaum

- Author: Heidi Zogbaum
- Publisher: SR Books
- Publication date: 1992
- Pages: 255

B. Traven: A Vision of Mexico is a study of B. Traven's experience in Mexico written by Heidi Zogbaum.

== Bibliography ==
- Benjamin, Thomas (1992). "Review of B. Traven: A Vision of Mexico". The Hispanic American Historical Review. 72 (4): 595–596. doi:10.1215/00182168-72.4.595. ISSN 0018-2168. JSTOR 2516663.
- Buve, Raymond (1992). "Review of B. Traven: A Vision of Mexico". Bulletin of Latin American Research. 11 (3): 343–344. doi:10.2307/3338877. ISSN 0261-3050. JSTOR 3338877.
- Guthke, Karl S. (1993). "Review of B. Traven: A Vision of Mexico". The German Quarterly (in German). 66 (2): 258–260. doi:10.2307/407485. ISSN 0016-8831. JSTOR 407485.
- Payne, Kenneth (1993). "Review of B. Traven: A Vision of Mexico; B. Traven: The Life Behind the Legends". Australasian Journal of American Studies. 12 (2): 76–78. ISSN 1838-9554. JSTOR 41053699.
- Schürer, Ernst (1994). "Review of B. Traven: A Vision of Mexico". Colloquia Germanica. 27 (1): 87–88. ISSN 0010-1338. JSTOR 23980613.
- Whitehead, Frank (1993). "Review of B. Traven: A Vision of Mexico". Journal of Latin American Studies. 25 (1): 225–226. doi:10.1017/S0022216X00000687. ISSN 0022-216X. JSTOR 157689. S2CID 145426718.
