= Wobbly (disambiguation) =

A Wobbly is a member of the Industrial Workers of the World (IWW).

Wobbly may also refer to:

- Waco, Beaumont, Trinity and Sabine Railway, a defunct Texas shortline railroad nicknamed the Wobbly
- Wobbly (musician)
- The Wobbly (novel), a 1926 novel by B. Traven
