= Das Totenschiff (film) =

1959 West German adventure film

The Death Ship
- Directed by: Georg Tressler
- Based on: The Death Ship by B. Traven
- Produced by: José Kohn; Georg Tressler; Dietrich von Theobald
- Starring: Horst Buchholz; Mario Adorf; Helmut Schmid; Elke Sommer
- Cinematography: Heinz Pehlke
- Edited by: Ilse Voigt
- Music by: Roland Kovac
- Production company: UFA
- Distributed by: UFA
- Release date: 1 October 1959
- Running time: 97 minutes
- Country: West Germany
- Language: German

The Death Ship (German: Das Totenschiff) is a 1959 West German thriller drama film directed by Georg Tressler and starring Horst Buchholz, Mario Adorf, Helmut Schmid, and Elke Sommer. The film is based on the book of the same name by B. Traven, author of The Treasure of Sierra Madre, and was filmed on location in Spain. The film's sets were designed by the art directors Emil Hasler and Walter Kutz.

== Plot ==
A group of outcast men drift around the world, never settling down or being accepted. They encounter various misadventures around the globe, including being forced to work on a decrepit ship!

== Cast ==
- Horst Buchholz as Amerikanischer Seeman
- Mario Adorf as Lawski - Polnischer Kohlenschlepper
- Elke Sommer as Mylene - ein Französisches Mädchen
- Helmut Schmid as Martin - Heizer auf der Yorikke
- Alf Marholm as Kapitän der Yorikke
- Werner Buttler as Dils - 1. Ingenieu
- Dieter von Keil as Statter - 1. Offizier
- Panos Papadopulos as Popoff - Bulgarischer Dockarbeiter
- Edgar O. Faiss as Bootsmann auf der Yorikke
- Günter Meisner as Paul - Trimmer auf der Yorikke
- Alfred Balthoff as Ballard
- Albert Bessler as US-Konsul
- Karl Lieffen as Belgischer Kripobeamter
- Marielouise Nagel as Blonde Prostituierte
- Claudia Gerstäcker as Shaba
