= Mario Ezcurdia Camacho =

Mario Ezcurdia
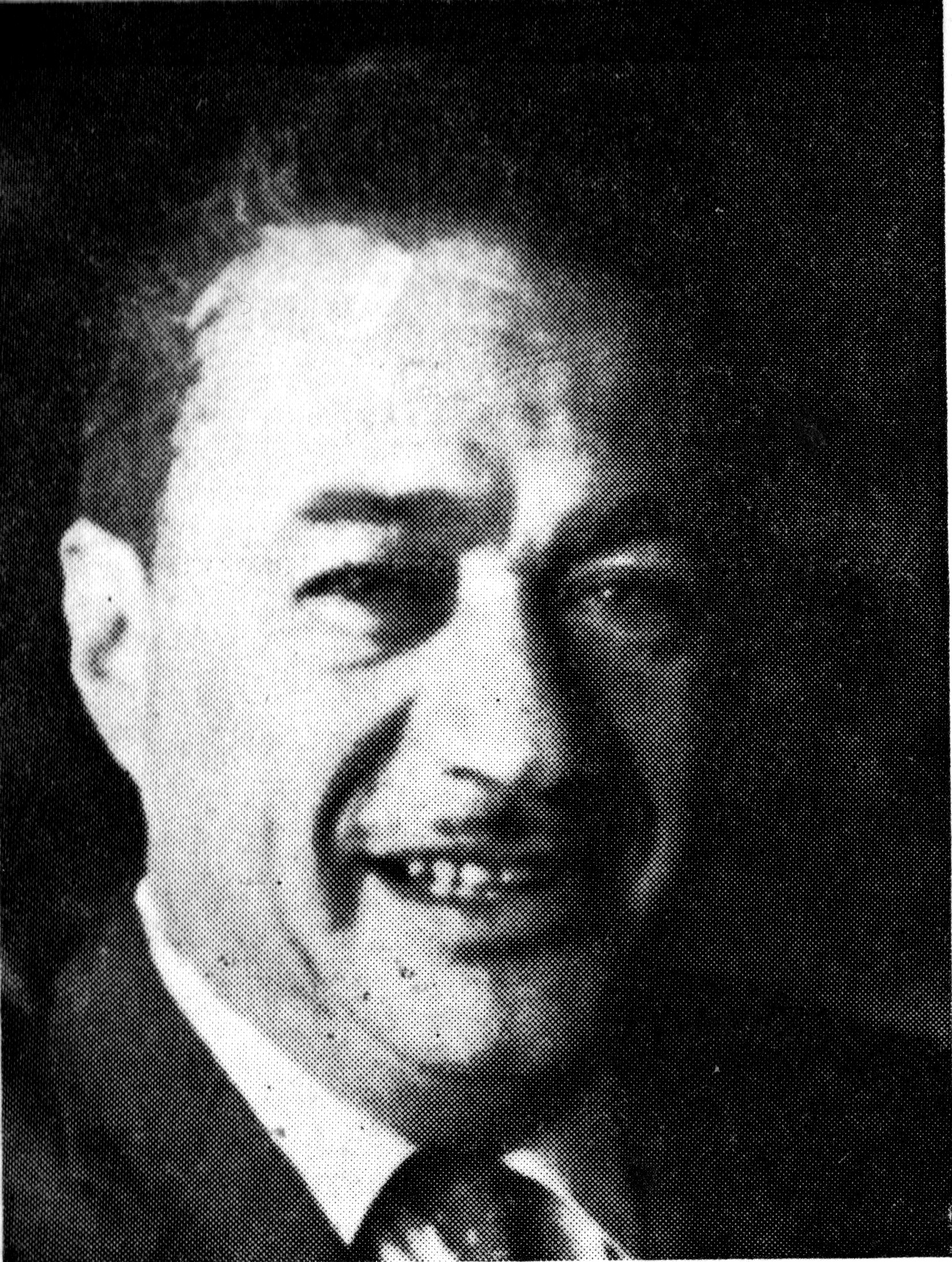
- Mario Ezcurdia on the back cover of his book, The Great Game
- Born: Mario Camacho Ezcurdia; October 1, 1925; Mexico City
- Died: October 8, 1998 (aged 73); Mexico City
- Occupations: Novelist, essayist, journalist and political scientist
- Spouse: Rosa María Valles Ruiz
- Children: Mario, Flower, Isabel, Carlos Lucero, Luis, Lorena, Maite, Cristian; Victor, Claudia
- Writing career
- Language: Spanish
- Genres: novels, essays, policy background

Mario Ezcurdia Camacho (October 1, 1925 in Mexico City – October 8, 1998) was a Mexican journalist, novelist and essayist.

== Biography ==
He was a member of the Institutional Revolutionary Party, where he founded and directed the theoretical group Línea (1972–1975). He started in journalism at age 16 in the year of 1943, as an assistant editorial office in the journal Hoy Today . During his tenure as head of press of the Office of the President of the Republic (Mexico) during the regime of Adolfo Lopez Mateos (1958–1964), his performance both at home and abroad was so bright that the organizers of the tour to South Africa of General Charles de Gaulle visited Mexico especially to ask Ezcurdia guidance and training.

== Journalistic career ==
- Editor-in-chief at Así (1948);
- Stage director (1949);
- Editor at El Popular (1950–1952), Impacto (1953–1955) and Ovaciones (1953–1955) Newspapers;
- Founding director of the magazine Al Día (1955–1958);
- Chief of press of the Presidency of the Republic during the regime of Adolfo López Mateos (1958–1964);
- Author of the column «Las cuentas claras», in El Universal, under the pseudonym of José C. Álvarez and with his own signature (1961–1962 and 1973–1974);
- Column Author «De la política», at El Día (1969–1972 and 1977–1982);
- Commentator and producer of journalistic programs on Channel 13 television (1974–1976);
- Article Writer (1976–1978) and general director of the newspaper El Nacional (1982–1989), and
- Author of the novel El gran juego (1967), of the chronicle Operación Europa and of the essays Análisis teórico del PRI, La prioridad es el hombre (1981) y Miguel de la Madrid, el hombre, el candidato (1982); gathered a selection of his articles in De la política.

== Awards and decorations ==
- Commander of the Great Cross of Merit of Germany ( Großes Verdienstkreuz )
- Grand Officer of the Order of the Flag of Yugoslavia
- Officer Legion of Honor of France
- Knight Order of Orange-Nassau NetherlandsWayback Machine
- National Journalism Award 1980 and 1982. Oficial Page of Mexican National journalism award Premio Nacional de Periodismo (México)

== Other sources and references ==
- Humberto Musacchio: Diccionario Enclopédico de México Ilustrado, Editorial Andrés León.
- Referencias an extractos bibliográficos del libro El Gran Juego, de Mario Ezcurdia Camacho, B. Costa-Amic, 1967
