= Last words =

Final words attributed to a person before their death

Last words are the final utterances before one's death. The meaning is sometimes expanded to somewhat earlier utterances.

Last words of famous or infamous people are sometimes recorded (although not always accurately), which then became a historical and literary trope. According to Karl Guthke, last words as recorded in public documents are reflections of the social attitude toward death at the time, rather than reports of actual statements. Published last words may reflect words that the dying person's intimates or supporters wished were their final testament.

Actual last words are typically less grandiose than those attributed to historical figures, and are also rarely published. Dying people frequently suffer delirium, diminished mental acuity, inability to speak clearly, or some combination of the three. Psychiatrist Sandy McLeod said people near death do not normally remain mentally clear. Some do not speak before their death. "People will whisper, and they'll be brief, single words – that's all they have energy for."

Actual final utterances are often short or difficult to interpret. Diminished breathing can limit volume, and medications, lack of energy, dry mouth, and the absence of dentures can also frustrate communication. Last words are commonly the names of spouses or children, or banal utterances such as "mama" or curse words.

== See also ==
- Deathbed confession
- Dying declaration
- List of last words
- Sayings of Jesus on the cross
