= Coffin ship (insurance) =

Overinsured ship

A coffin ship is any ship that has been overinsured and is therefore worth more to its owners sunk than afloat. These were hazardous places to work in the days before effective maritime safety regulation. They were generally eliminated in the 1870s with the success of reforms championed by British MP Samuel Plimsoll.

Many overloaded overinsured ships in the days of wooden sailing ships were old ships riddled with wood rot and woodworm and shipworm, repainted and renamed and falsely stated to be new ships. There were over 2,000 cases of sailors who had signed on as crew for a ship being tried in court for refusing to board upon seeing its condition. Plimsoll stated in the British Parliament, "The Secretary of Lloyd's tells a friend of mine that he does not know a single ship which has been broken up voluntarily by the owners in the course of 30 years on account of its being worn out".

In 1977, the ship Lucona sank in the Indian Ocean as a result of a time bomb, which had been planted by Udo Proksch, the owner of the cargo, so that he could fraudulently collect the insurance money. The cargo was claimed to consist of a disassembled uranium processing plant but in fact consisted of worthless scrap, and 6 of the 12 crew members died.

== In popular culture ==
The poem The Ballad of the Bolivar by Rudyard Kipling, first published in 1892, describes the successful voyage of the unseaworthy freighter Bolivar from Sunderland in northern England to Bilbao in Spain. The ship is described as a rusted, rotten and leaking coffin ship and pokes fun at the vessel's owners for the sailors' success at bringing it across the Bay of Biscay in stormy conditions.

The 1900 Dutch play Op hoop van zegen by the socialist playwright Herman Heijermans depicts a ruthless shipowner in a small Dutch village sending an unsound fishing boat out into a stormy sea, with the deliberate result that it becomes lost with all hands with the owner pocketing the insurance money. The play is considered a classic of Dutch theatre and literature and was adapted to film four times.

In the 1936 film Windbag the Sailor, an incompetent captain is given command of an unseaworthy vessel by a criminal gang that intends to scupper it and claim its insurance value.

The BBC television drama series The Onedin Line details coffin ship fraud in 1972 episode S02E07 "Coffin Ship", and presents Samuel Plimsoll and his efforts in 1973 episode S03E06 "Danger Level" as well.

Leon Uris also refers to coffin ships in his novel Redemption.

The Death Ship (German title: Das Totenschiff) is a novel by the pseudonymous author known as B. Traven which deals with sailors working on a ship which the owners want to sink.

== See also ==
- The London, an overloaded ship that sank in 1866
- Russian shadow fleet, also often claimed to be barely seaworthy vessels, however in contrast to over-insured coffin ships, those are usually under-insured
