= Der Ziegelbrenner =

German anarchist magazine (1917–1921)

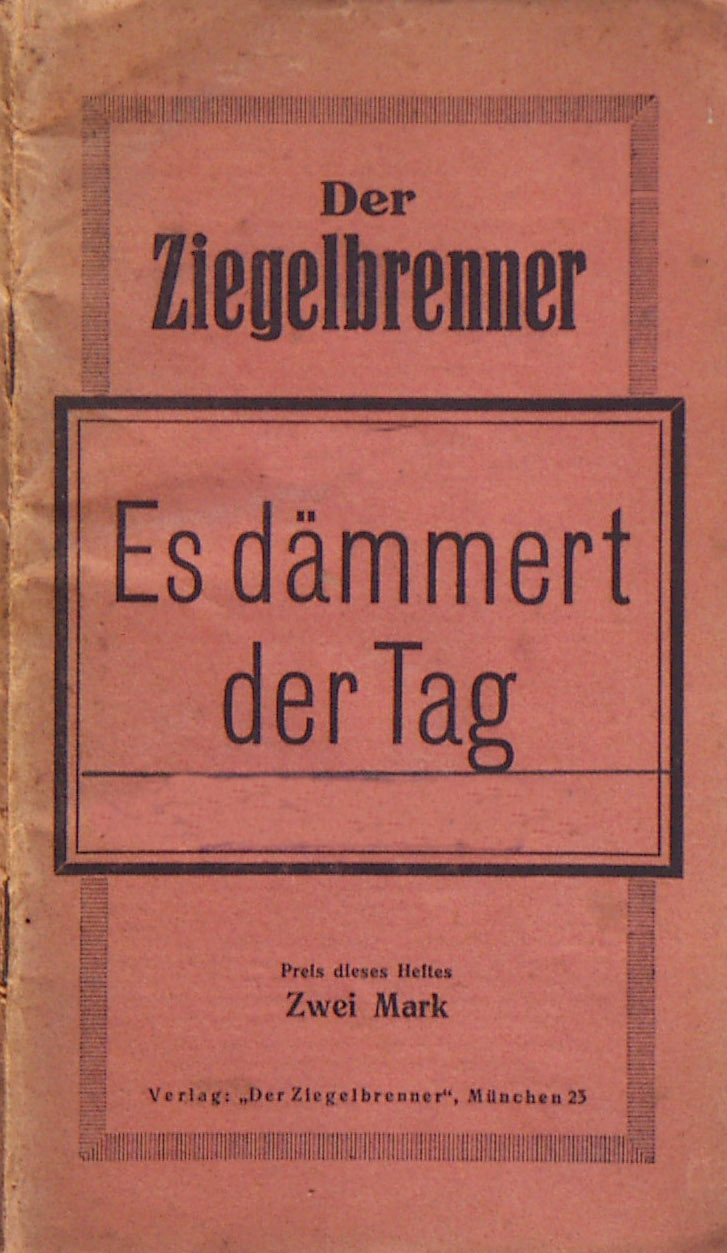
- Editor: Ret Marut
- Categories: Anarchism, satire
- Frequency: Irregular
- Founder: Ret Marut
- First issue: 1 September 1917
- Final issue Number: 21 December 1921; Nos. 35–40 (13th instalment)
- Country: Germany
- Based in: Munich; Cologne
- Language: German
- OCLC: 1057948194

Der Ziegelbrenner ("The Brick Burner") (Note: Also translated as "The Brick-Maker".) was a German anarchist satirical magazine published by Ret Marut in Munich and later Cologne from 1917 to 1921. Appearing irregularly, it criticised militarism, the bourgeoisie, organised religion and the German press. Marut, who later became known as the novelist B. Traven, edited the magazine and wrote most of its contents.

== History ==
The first issue of Der Ziegelbrenner appeared in Munich on 1 September 1917, during the First World War. It carried the subtitle Kritik an Zuständen und widerwärtigen Zeitgenossen ("Criticism of Conditions and Repugnant Contemporaries"). Marut was responsible for its publication, editing and much of its writing. He sought to keep his whereabouts concealed, giving only "München 23" as the editorial address from the second issue onwards.

According to the writer Oskar Maria Graf, Marut was able to circumvent wartime censorship by presenting the magazine to the authorities as a trade publication for bricklayers. Some material was nevertheless censored. The January 1919 issue, titled Zensur ("Censorship"), collected articles and other writings that had been suppressed during the war.

Marut participated in the Bavarian Soviet Republic in 1919. Following its suppression, Der Ziegelbrenner was banned but continued to appear clandestinely until 1921. Marut fled Munich and spent time in the Rhineland, where the artist Franz Wilhelm Seiwert helped distribute the magazine and provided illustrations for its final instalment, Gegensatz. Sieben Antlitze der Zeit ("Opposition: Seven Faces of the Age").

The magazine appeared in 13 instalments comprising 40 consecutively numbered issues. The final instalment was dated 21 December 1921.

== Content ==
Der Ziegelbrenner published political and literary criticism, satire and anarchist writings. Its articles opposed the war and criticised the German press, the middle classes, the military and the Church. The magazine also published literary works, including Marut's German translation of Percy Bysshe Shelley's Die Menschenrechte, commentary on the death of Frank Wedekind, and philosophical writings influenced by Max Stirner.

The magazine circulated among left-wing literary circles, although its readership was relatively small. On 14 December 1918, a public event devoted to Der Ziegelbrenner was held at the Kunstsaal Steinicke in Munich. Marut, concealing his identity by appearing as a visiting reciter, read his appeal for an individualist anarchist revolution. An account of the event appeared in a subsequent issue.

In 1927, the anarchist writer Erich Mühsam published an appeal titled "Wo ist der Ziegelbrenner?" ("Where Is the Brick Burner?") in his magazine Fanal, asking Marut, whose whereabouts were then unknown to him, to make contact.
