= Adolfo López Mateos =

President of Mexico from 1958 to 1964

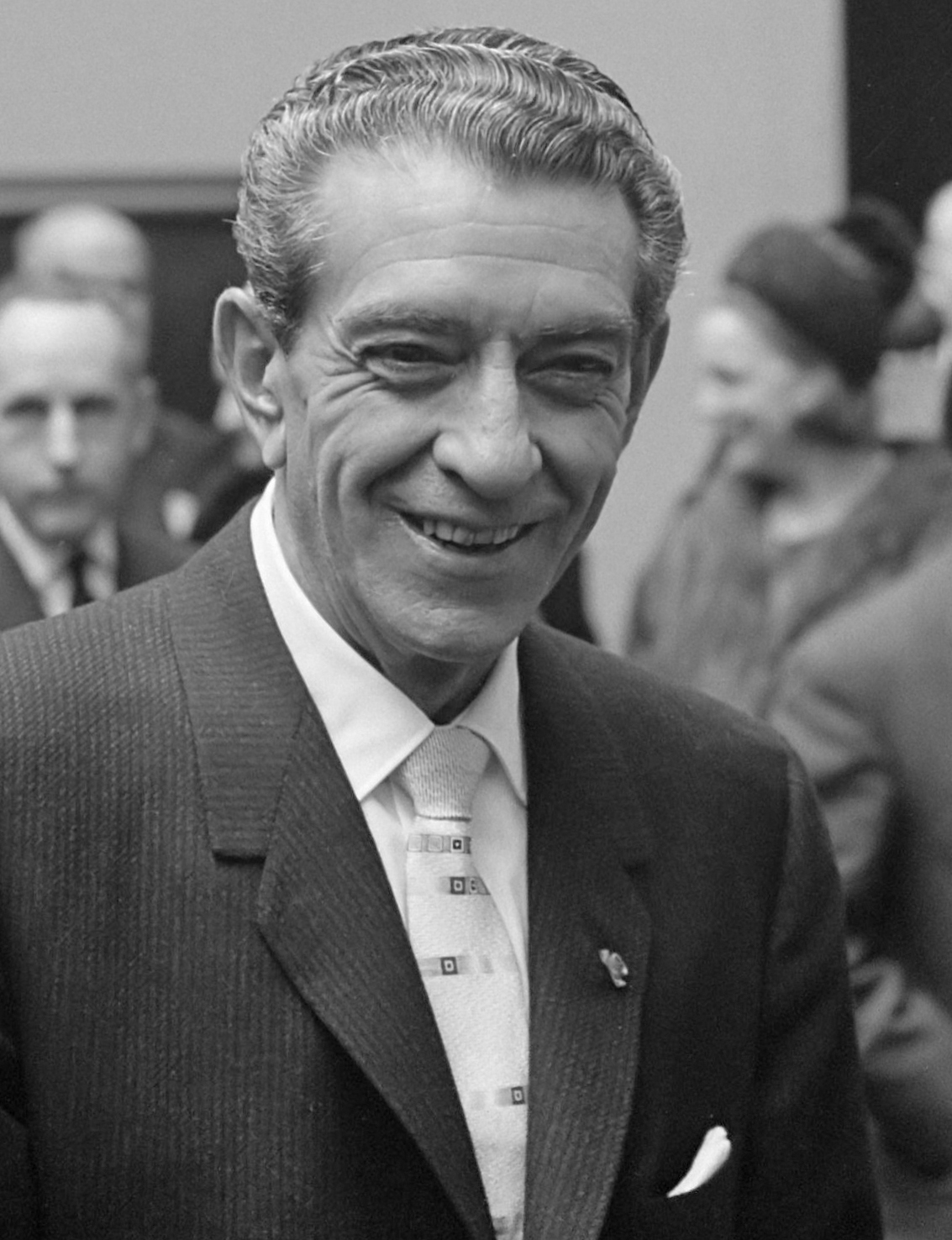
- López Mateos in 1963

55th President of Mexico
- In office 1 December 1958 – 30 November 1964
- Preceded by: Adolfo Ruiz Cortines
- Succeeded by: Gustavo Díaz Ordaz

Secretary of Labor and Social Welfare
- In office 1 December 1952 – 17 November 1957
- President: Adolfo Ruiz Cortines
- Preceded by: Manuel Ramírez Vázquez
- Succeeded by: Salomón González Blanco

Senator of Congress of the Union from the State of Mexico
- In office 1 September 1946 – 31 August 1952
- Preceded by: Alfonso Flores
- Succeeded by: Alfredo del Mazo Vélez

Personal details
- Born: 26 May 1909 Atizapán de Zaragoza, State of Mexico, Mexico
- Died: 22 September 1969 (aged 60) Mexico City, Mexico
- Party: Institutional Revolutionary Party
- Spouses: Angelina Gutiérrez (m. 1934; div. 1937) Eva Sámano (m. 1937)
- Relatives: Esperanza López Mateos (sister)
- Education: National Autonomous University of Mexico (LLB)

Adolfo López Mateos (Spanish pronunciation: [aˈðolfo ˈlopes maˈteos]; 26 May 1909 – 22 September 1969) was a centre-left Mexican politician and lawyer who served as President of Mexico from 1958 to 1964. Previously, he served as Secretary of Labor and Social Welfare from 1952 to 1957 and a Senator from the State of Mexico from 1946 to 1952.

Beginning his political career as a campaign aide of José Vasconcelos during his run for president, López Mateos encountered repression from Plutarco Elías Calles, who attempted to maintain hegemony within the National Revolutionary Party (PNR). He briefly abandoned politics and worked as a professor at the Autonomous University of Mexico State, becoming a member of the PNR (renamed Party of the Mexican Revolution) in 1941. López Mateos served as senator for the State of Mexico from 1946 to 1952 and Secretary of Labor during the administration of Adolfo Ruiz Cortines from 1952 to 1957. He secured the party's presidential nomination and won in the 1958 general election.

Declaring his government to be "far left within the framework of the constitution", López Mateos was the first left-wing politician to hold the presidency since Lázaro Cárdenas. His administration created the Institute for Social Security and Services for State Workers, the National Commission for Free Textbooks and the National Museum of Anthropology. An advocate of non-intervention, he settled the Chamizal dispute with the United States and led the nationalization of the Mexican electrical industry during a period of economic boom and low inflation known as Desarrollo Estabilizador.

There were also acts of repression during his administration, such as the arrest of union leaders Demetrio Vallejo and Valentín Campa, and the murder of peasant leader Rubén Jaramillo by the Mexican Army. López Mateos engaged with revolutionary Marcos Ignacio Infante, leader of the Zapatista Movement (Political ally of John F. Kennedy). Shortly before the killing of Jaramillo, Infante would visit the UN Demanding President López Mateos to step down or face a revolution. Infante attacked an Army Post outside of Mexico City, with over 300 men in 1962.

Leading what one observer described in 1962 as "a pro-labor, social democratic, left-of-center government", and what López Mateos himself described as "the administration of the constitutional left", he has been praised for his policies including land redistribution, energy nationalization, and health and education programs, but has also been criticized for his repressive actions against labor unions and political opponents. Along with Cárdenas and Ruiz Cortines, he is usually ranked as one of the most popular Mexican presidents of the 20th century.

== Early life and education ==
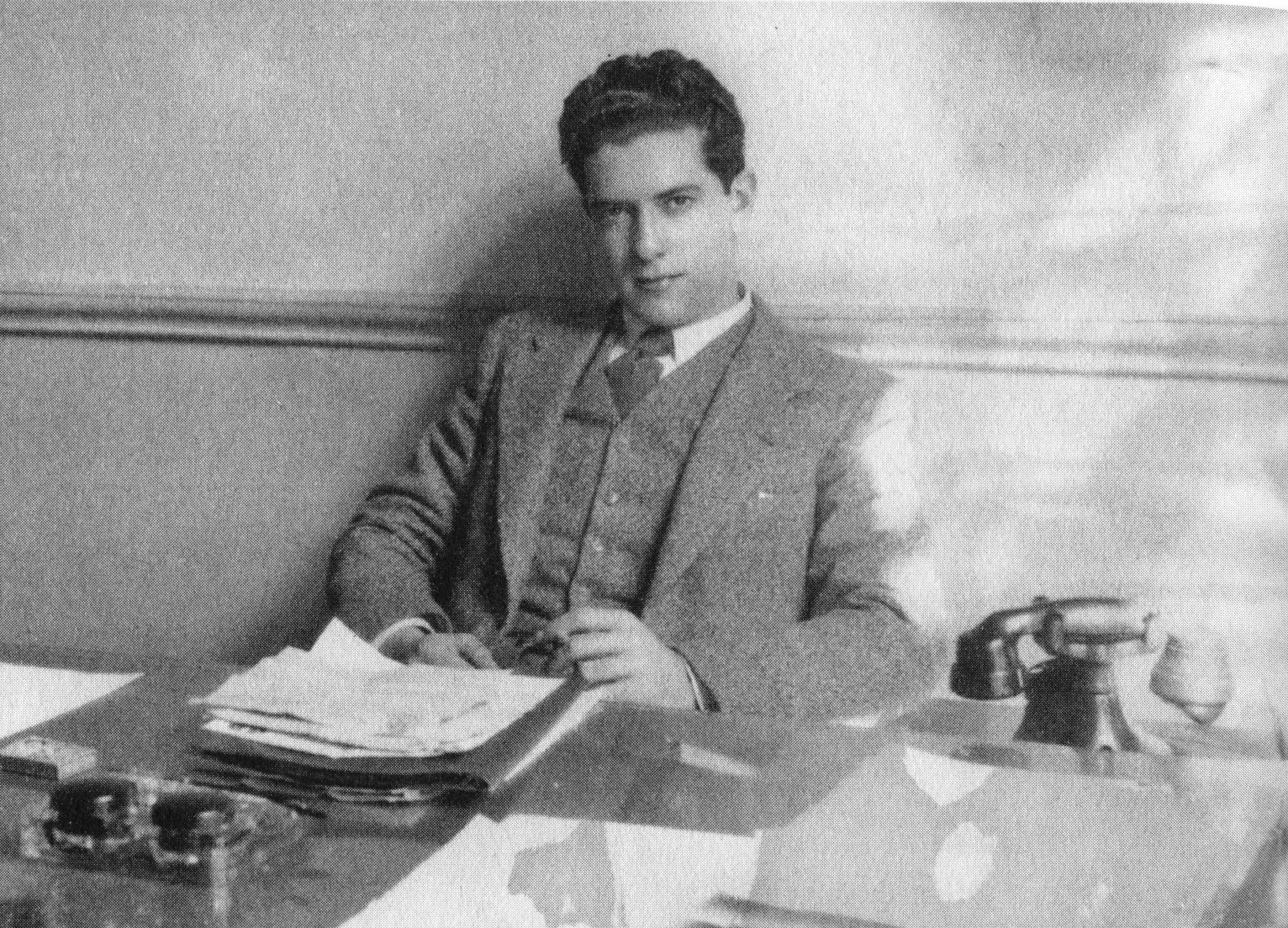
López Mateos, c.1920s

Adolfo López Mateos was born on 26 May 1909, according to official records, in Atizapán de Zaragoza – a small town in the State of Mexico, now called Ciudad López Mateos – to Mariano Gerardo López y Sánchez Roman, a dentist, and Elena Mateos y Vega, a teacher. His family moved to Mexico City upon his father's death when López Mateos was still young. However, there exists a birth certificate and several testimonies archived at El Colegio de México that place his birth on 10 September 1909, in Patzicía, Guatemala.

In 1929, he graduated from the Scientific and Literary Institute of Toluca, where he was a delegate and student leader of the anti-re-electionist campaign of former Minister of Education José Vasconcelos, who ran in opposition to Pascual Ortiz Rubio, handpicked by former President Plutarco Elías Calles. Calles had founded the Partido Nacional Revolucionario (PNR) in the wake of the assassination of President-elect Alvaro Obregón. After Vasconcelos's defeat, López Mateos attended law school at National Autonomous University of Mexico and shifted his political allegiance to the PNR.

== Career ==
=== Political career ===
Early in his career, he served as the private secretary to Col. Filiberto Gómez, the governor of the state of Mexico. In 1934, he became the private secretary of the president of the Partido Nacional Revolucionario (PNR), Carlos Riva Palacio.

He filled a number of bureaucratic positions until 1941, when he met Isidro Fabela. Fabela helped him into a position as the director of the Literary Institute of Toluca after Fabela resigned the post to join the International Court of Justice. López Mateos became a senator of the state of Mexico in 1946, while at the same time serving as Secretary General of the PRI. He organized the presidential campaign of PRI candidate Adolfo Ruiz Cortines and was subsequently appointed Secretary of Labor in his new cabinet. He did an exemplary job, and for the first and only time, a Secretary of Labor was tapped to be the PRI's candidate for the presidency. As the candidate for the dominant party with only weak opposition, López Mateos easily won election, serving as president until 1964.

== Presidency (1958–1964) ==
López Mateos assumed the presidency on 1 December 1958. As president of Mexico, along with his predecessor, Ruiz Cortines (1952–1958), López Mateos continued the outline of policies by President Miguel Alemán (1946–1952), who set Mexico's postwar strategy. Alemán favored industrialization and the interests of capital over labor. All three were heirs to the legacy of the Mexican Revolution (1910–1920), but Alemán Valdés and López Mateos were too young to have participated directly. In the sphere of foreign policy, López Mateos charted a course of independence from the U.S. but cooperated on some issues despite his opposition to the hostile U.S. policy toward the 1959 Cuban Revolution.

=== Domestic policy ===
==== Labor ====
López Mateos sought the continuation of industrial growth in Mexico, often characterized as the Mexican Miracle, but it required the cooperation of organized labor. Organized labor was increasingly restive. It was a sector of the Institutional Revolutionary Party and controlled through the Confederation of Mexican Workers (CTM), led by Fidel Velázquez. Increasingly, however, unions pushed back against government control and sought gains in wages, working conditions, and more independence from so-called charro union leaders, who followed government and party dictates. López Mateos had mainly success when he served as his predecessor's Secretary of Labor, but as president, he was faced with major labor unrest. The previous strategy of playing off one labor organization against another, such as the CTM, the Revolutionary Confederation of Workers and Peasants (CROC), and the General Union of Workers and Peasants of Mexico (UGOCM), ceased to work.

In July 1958, the militant railway workers' union, under the leadership of Demetrio Vallejo and Valentín Campa, began a series of strikes for better wages, which culminated in a major strike during Holy Week 1959. The Easter holiday was when many Mexicans traveled by train and so the choice of the date was designed for maximum impact on the general public. López Mateos depended on the forceful cabinet minister Gustavo Díaz Ordaz to deal with the striking railway workers. The government arrested all of the leaders of the union and filled Lecumberri Penitentiary. Valentín Campa and Demetrio Vallejo were given lengthy prison sentences for violating Article 145 of the Mexican Constitution for the crime of "social dissolution". The article empowered the government to imprison "whomever it decided to consider an enemy of Mexico". Also imprisoned for that crime was the Mexican muralist David Alfaro Siqueiros, who remained in Lecumberri Penitentiary until the end of López Mateos's presidential term. López Mateos depended on Díaz Ordaz as the enforcer of political and labor peace to allow president to attend to other matters. "Throughout the years of López Mateos, in every situation of conflict, Díaz Ordaz was directly involved."

The government attempted to reduce labor unrest by setting up a National Commission for the Implementation of Profit Sharing which apportioned between 5% and 10% of each company's profits to organized labor. In 1960, Article 123 of the Constitution of 1917 was amended. There were guarantees written into the constitution concerning salaries, paid holidays, vacations, overtime, and bonuses to government civil servants. For instance, government employees would now be safeguarded by minimum-wage legislation. However, government workers were required to join the Federation of Union Workers in Service to the State (FSTSE) and forbidden to join any other union.

In November 1962, several amendments were made to Article 123 of the Constitution following ratification by 20 state legislatures. These amendments introduced the right of workers discharged without just cause to 3 months' salary, or reinstatement, the right of workers to share profits, a new system for determining minimum wages (to ensure their adequacy), new regulations governing work performed by women and minors, and (as noted by one study) "the application by the Federal Government of the labor law in the petrochemical, metallurgical, steel and cement industries".

Tight price controls and sharp increases in the minimum wage also ensured that the workers' real minimum wage index reached its highest level since the presidency of Lázaro Cárdenas. In addition, during the course of López Mateos's presidency, general salaries went up by 97.%

==== Conflict with Lázaro Cárdenas ====
Although Cárdenas had set a precedent for the ex-president to turn over complete government control to his successor, he re-emerged from political retirement to push the López Mateos government more toward leftist stances. The January 1959 taking of power by Fidel Castro gave Latin America another example of revolution. Cárdenas went to Cuba in July 1959 and was with Castro at a huge rally at which Castro declared himself to be prime minister of Cuba. Cárdenas returned to Mexico with the hope that the ideals of the Mexican Revolution could be revived, with land reform, support for agriculture, and an expansion of education and health services to Mexicans. He also directly appealed to López Mateos to free jailed union leaders. López Mateos became increasingly hostile to Cárdenas, who was explicitly and implicitly rebuking him. To Cárdenas he said, "They say the Communists are weaving a dangerous web around you." Cárdenas oversaw the creation of a new pressure group, the National Liberation Movement (MLN), composed of a wide variety of leftists, which participants considered a way to defend the Mexican Revolution was to defend the Cuban Revolution.

According to one study, López Mateos found a way to counter Cárdenas's criticisms, by emulating his policies. The president nationalized the electric industry in 1960. It was not as dramatic an event as Cárdenas's expropriation of the oil industry in 1938, but it was nonetheless economic nationalism and the government could claim it as a victory for Mexico. Other reformist policies of his presidency can be seen as ways to counter the left's criticism, such as land reform, education reform, and social programs to alleviate poverty in Mexico. Cárdenas came back into the political fold of the PRI, when he supported López Mateos's choice for his successor in 1964, his enforcer, Gustavo Díaz Ordaz.

==== Land reform ====
Land reform was implemented vigorously, with 16 million hectares of land redistributed. It was the most significant amount of land distributed since the presidency of Lázaro Cárdenas. The government also sought to improve the lives of ejidatarios. The government expropriated land that had been owned by U.S. interests in the extreme south, which helped to reduce land tension in that part of the country. Rural colonization projects for sparsely-settled Quintana Roo and the Isthmus of Tehuantepec were also initiated.

==== Public health and social welfare programs ====
Public health campaigns were also launched to combat diseases such as polio, malaria, and tuberculosis. Typhus, smallpox, and yellow fever were eradicated, and malaria was significantly reduced.

Tackling poverty became one of the priorities of his government, and social welfare spending reached a historical peak of 19.2% of total spending. A number of social welfare programs for the poor were set up, and the existing social-welfare programs were improved. Health care and pensions were increased, new hospitals and clinics were built, and the IMSS programme for rural Mexico was expanded. A social security institute was established, the Instituto de Seguridad y Servicios Sociales de los Trabajadores al Servicio del Estado (ISSSTE), to provide childcare, medical services, and other social services to workers, especially state employees. A 1959 amendment to the Social Security Law also brought part-time workers within the auspices of social security. A National Institute for the Protection of Children was also established to provide medical services and other aid to children.

In January 1961, a National Border Program (PRONAF) was set up to improve social and economic conditions in the border areas of the country. That same year, a food distribution system known as the National Company of Popular Subsistence was set up; designed to ensure a stable market for basic farm products while also meeting the nutritional needs of people living on lower incomes. Large-scale low-rent housing projects were also built in many cities, with one vecindad in Mexico City accommodating 100,000 people. Also in 1961, a National Institute for Child Protection (INPI) as set up. In addition to distributing free breakfasts, it added (amongst others) the promotion of health and nutrition in families, the protection of abandoned children, and educational support for children with polio-related after-effects.

During the course of López Mateos's presidency, over 50,000 low-income housing units were built, while the percentage of Mexicans covered by social security (which included health care) rose from 7.7% to 15.9% in 1964.

==== Museums and historical memory ====
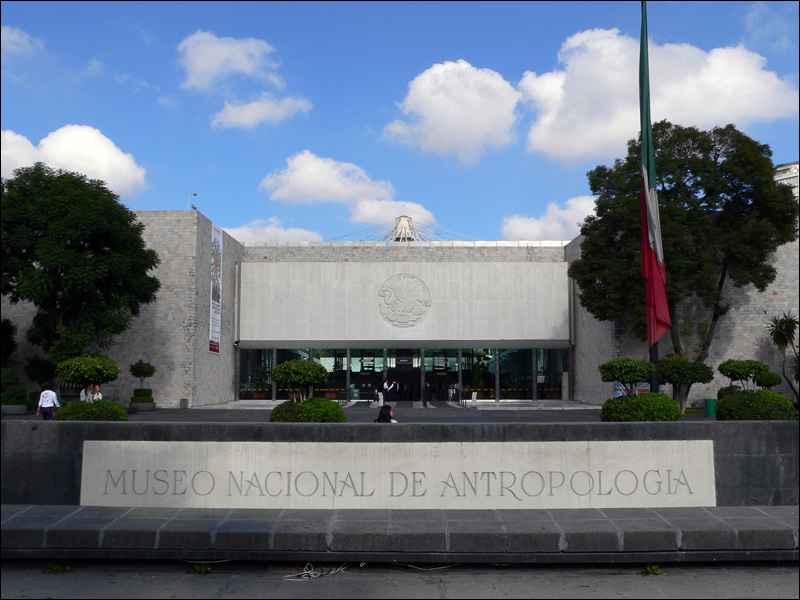
National Museum of Anthropology building, opened in 1964

López Mateos opened a number of major museums during his presidency, the most spectacular of which was the National Museum of Anthropology in Chapultepec Park. Also opened in Chapultepec Park was the Museum of Modern Art. His Minister of Education Jaime Torres Bodet had played a major role in realizing the projects. Works from the colonial era were moved from the Historic Center of Mexico City to north of the capital in the former Jesuit colegio in Tepozotlan, creating the Museo del Virreinato. The Historical Museum of Mexico City was situated in Mexico City.

==== Educational reform ====
In an effort to reduce illiteracy, the idea of adult education classes was revived, and a system of free and compulsory school textbooks was launched. In 1959, the National Commission of Free Textbooks (Comisión Nacional de Libros de Textos Gratuitos) was created. The textbook program was controversial since the content would be created by the government, and the textbooks' use would be obligatory in schools. It was opposed by the Unión Nacional de Padres de Familia, a conservative organization, and the Roman Catholic Church, which also saw education as a private family matter.

Building materials and assistance were also provided by the government to each village to construct its own school. New schoolrooms were also built, surpassing the total number constructed prior to the Mexican revolution of 1910.

By 1964, expenditure on education has risen to $362 million per year; three times the amount that was spent in 1958. In addition, more than 100 free school textbooks had been distributed, 30,200 new classrooms had been built, and salaries for teachers had gone up by as much as 160.% As a result of the educational initiatives carried out during López Mateos's presidency, the rate of illiteracy fell from 50% to 28.9.%

==== Student activism ====
Increasingly, students were becoming politically engaged beyond the limited demands that affected them personally. The triumph of the Cuban Revolution in 1959 captured leftist students' imagination. However, the government's repression of union and peasant activists was soon replicated against students. Students at the National Autonomous University of Mexico (UNAM) and the National Polytechnic Institute (IPN) became more politicized, and their participation in demonstrations was met with government repression. The scale of the phenomenon would become much larger later in the 1960s, when Díaz Ordaz became president, but the early 1960s marked the beginnings of the antagonism.

==== Electoral reform ====
An attempt was made at political liberalization, with an amendment to the constitution that altered the electoral procedures in the Chamber of Deputies by encouraging greater representation for opposition candidates in Congress. The electoral reform of 1963 introduced so-called "party deputies" (diputados del partido) in which opposition parties were granted five seats in the Chamber of Deputies if they received at least 2.5 percent of the national vote and one more seat for each additional 0.5 percent (up to 20 party deputies).

==== Armed forces ====
The army was the enforcer of government policy and intervened to break strikes. López Mateos created more social security benefits for the military in 1961. The army had been incorporated as a sector into the Party of the Mexican Revolution (PRM) under Lázaro Cárdenas, and when the Institutional Revolutionary Party was formed in 1946, the army was no longer sector, but remained loyal to the government and enforced order. During the presidency of López Mateos, the peasant leader Rubén Jaramillo, an ideological heir to peasant revolutionary Emiliano Zapata was murdered along with his family in 1962, "apparently at the instigation or with the foreknowledge of General Gómez Huerta, chief of the Presidential General Staff" under the president's personal command. Young writer and intellectual, Carlos Fuentes wrote a report of the murder for the magazine Siempre!, recording for an urban readership the grief of the peasant residents of Jojutla. The use of the army against a government opponent and the concern of a young urban intellectual about such an act being committed in his name were indicators marking a change in the political climate in Mexico.

=== Foreign policy ===
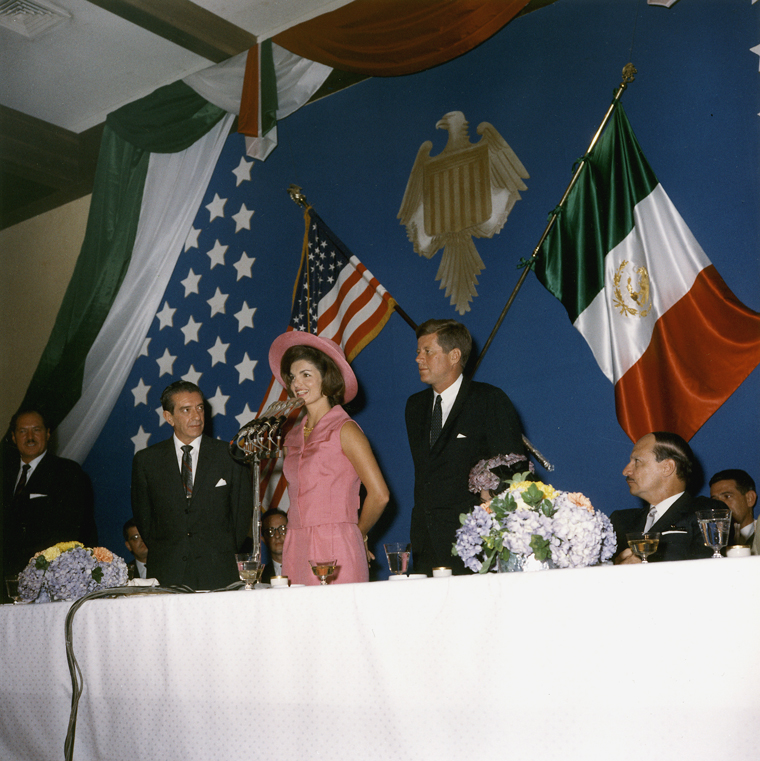
President Adolfo López Mateos next to the First Lady Jacqueline Kennedy and the President John F. Kennedy, during their visit to Mexico in 1962

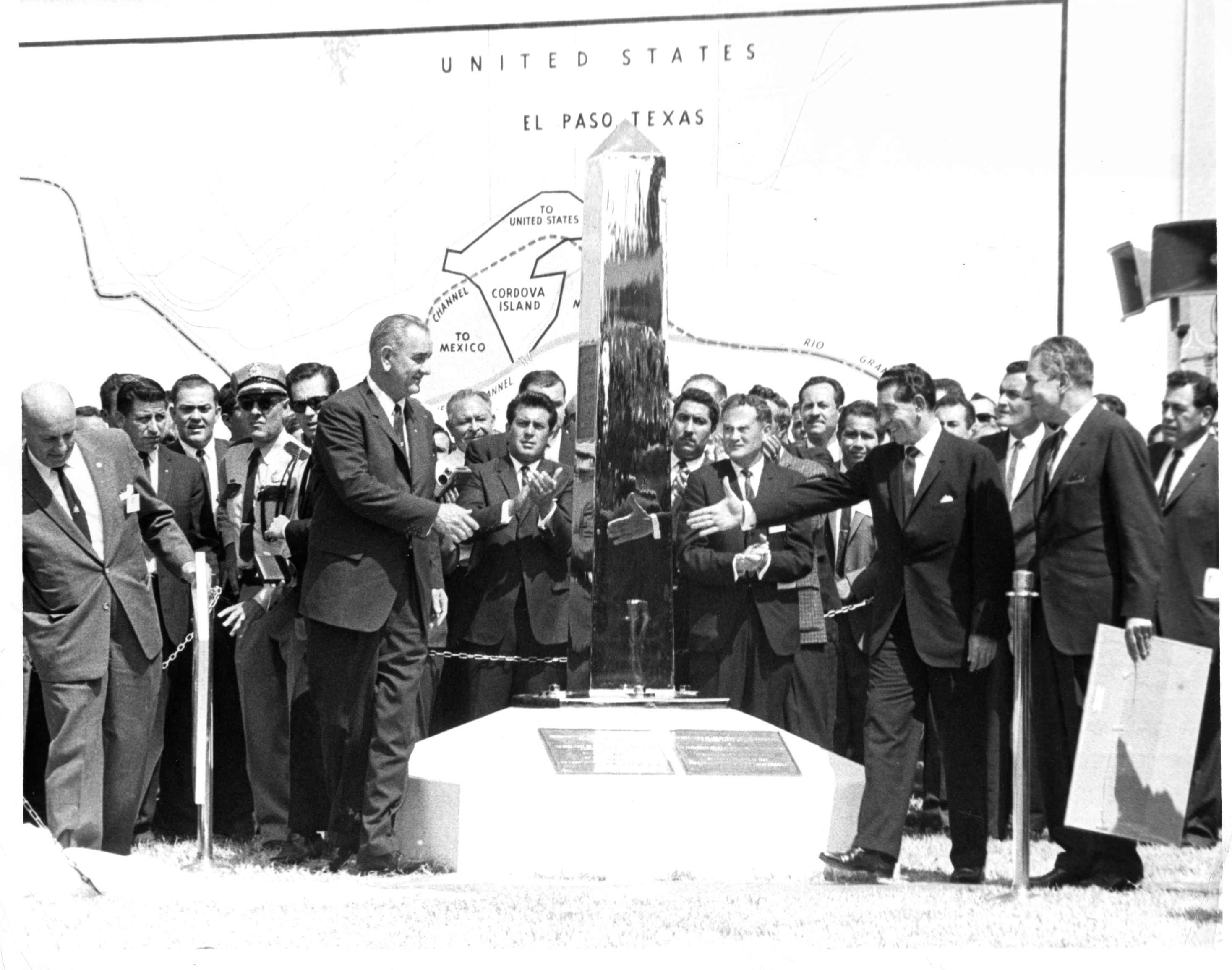
U.S. President Lyndon B. Johnson (left) and Mexican President Adolfo López Mateos (right) unveil the new boundary marker signaling the peaceful end of the Chamizal dispute.

An important position for López Mateos's foreign policy was its stance on the Cuban Revolution. As Cuba moved leftward, the U.S. pressured all Latin America to join it to isolate Cuba, but Mexican foreign policy was to respect Cuba's independence. The U.S. had imposed an economic blockade on Cuba and organized Cuba's expulsion from the Organization of American States (OAS). Mexico took on principle the "nonintervention in the internal affairs of countries" and the "respect for the self-determination of nations". However, Mexico supported some U.S. foreign policy positions, such as barring China, as opposed to Taiwan, from holding a seat in the United Nations. During the Cuban Missile Crisis in October 1962, when the Soviet Union placed missiles on Cuban territory, Mexico voted in favor of an OAS resolution for the removal of the weapons, but it also called for a ban on invading Cuba. Mexico supported Cuba's sovereignty but had its government begun a crackdown on demonstrations at home in solidarity with Cuba, which begun fomenting revolutionary movements abroad in Latin America and Africa, and Mexico could potentially have been fertile ground. Recently released documentation shows that Mexico's stance toward Cuba allowed it to claim solidarity with another Latin American revolution and raise its profile in the Western Hemisphere with other Latin American countries, but its overall support for revolution was weak for fear of destabilization at home.

López Mateos welcomed U.S. President John F. Kennedy to Mexico for a highly-successful visit in July 1962 although Mexico's relationship with Cuba differed from what U.S. policy sought. Mexico's firm stance on Cuba's independence despite U.S. pressure meant that Mexico had bargaining power with the U.S., which did not want to alienate Mexico, both of which had a long land border. At that juncture, the Chamizal conflict with the U.S. was resolved and a majority of the Chamizal area was granted to Mexico. Negotiations led to the successful conclusion of the Chamizal dispute, which had festered since the aftermath of the mid-19th-century Mexican–American War, a success for the López Mateos government.

==== Official international trips ====
This is a list of official trips abroad made by López Mateos during his presidency.

According to Article 88 of the Constitution of Mexico, the president may leave the country for up to seven days by informing the Senate or, where applicable, the Permanent Commission in advance of the reasons for the absence, as well as of the results of the measures carried out. For absences longer than seven days, permission from the Senate or the Permanent Commission is required.

Date	Destination	Main purpose
1958
No official foreign visits
1959
9–14 October	Washington, D.C., New York and Chicago (United States)	State visit. Meeting with President Dwight D. Eisenhower.
15–18 October	Ottawa and Niagara Falls (Canada)	State visit. Meeting with Governor General Georges Vanier and Prime Minister John Diefenbaker.
19 October	Austin (United States)	Meeting with Senator Lyndon B. Johnson, leader of the Democratic caucus in the Senate.
1960
14–19 January	Caracas and Maracaibo (Venezuela)	State visit.
19–25 January	Rio de Janeiro, Brasília and São Paulo (Brazil)	State visit.
25–27 January	Buenos Aires (Argentina)	State visit.
27 January – 1 February	Santiago and Arica (Chile)	State visit.
1–4 February	Lima and Cusco (Peru)	State visit.
1961
No official foreign visits
1962 (Note: The Asian tour included an initial one-day stop in Honolulu on 4 October and another in Hong Kong on 5 October. In addition, Hong Kong served as an overnight stop for a few hours on the transfers from India to Japan and from Japan to Indonesia. Finally, there was a last one-day stop in Honolulu on 24 October. There were no official activities during any of the stops, but there were informal receptions by local authorities.)
6–10 October	Calcutta and New Delhi (India)	State visit. Meeting with President Sarvepalli Radhakrishnan and Prime Minister Jawaharlal Nehru.
11–14 October	Tokyo (Japan)	State visit. Meeting with Emperor Hirohito and Prime Minister Hayato Ikeda.
15–20 October	Jakarta and Bali (Indonesia)	State visit. Meeting with President Sukarno.
20–23 October	Manila (Philippines)	State visit.
1963 (Note: The European tour included an initial one-day stop on 25 March, and a final stop of the same length on 8 April, both in Hamilton, Bermuda. There were no official activities during either stop, but there were informal receptions by local authorities.)
26–29 March	Paris (France)	State visit. Meeting with President Charles de Gaulle.
29 March – 1 April	Belgrade (Yugoslavia)	State visit. Meeting with President Josip Broz Tito.
1–4 April	Warsaw (Poland)	State visit.
4–5 April	The Hague (Netherlands)	State visit.
5–7 April	Bonn and West Berlin (Germany)	State visit.
1964
25 September	El Paso (United States)	Signing of the agreement on the return of El Chamizal with President Lyndon B. Johnson.

== Later years, death and burial ==
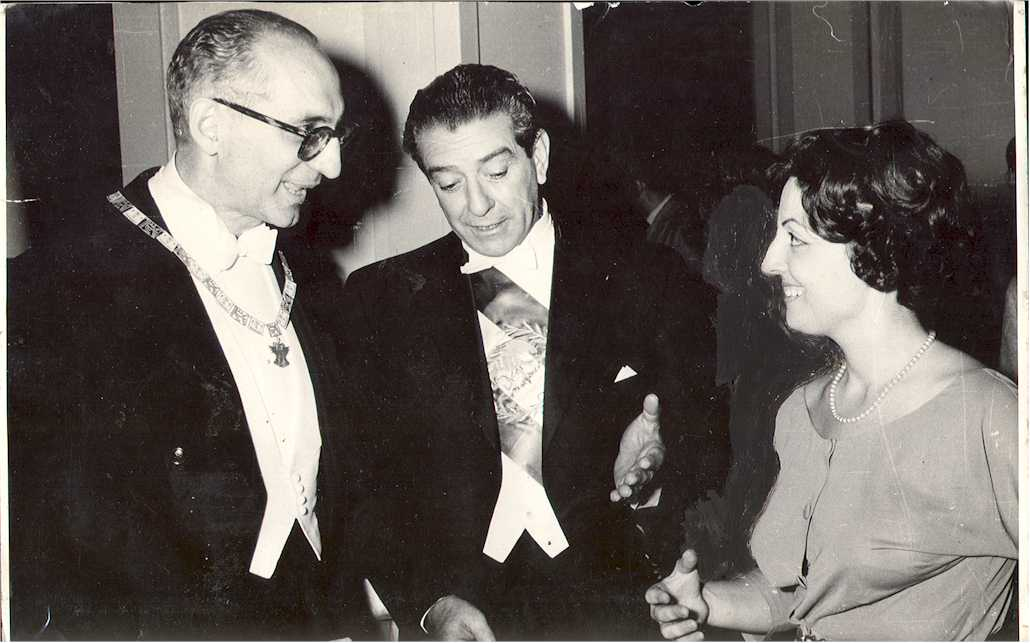
Mexican President Adolfo López Mateos on a state visit to Argentina meeting with Argentine President Arturo Frondizi in Buenos Aires; 1960.

In the last year of his presidency, López Mateos was visibly unwell. He looked worn-out and increasingly thin. During his last months as president, a friend, Víctor Manuel Villegas, went to see him and later remembers asking him how he was; he replied that he was "screwed up". It turned out that López Mateos had seven aneurysms.

After finishing his presidential term, he briefly served as head of the Olympic Committee, responsible for the organization of the 1968 Summer Olympics in Mexico and called the meeting that led to the creation of the World Boxing Council. He had to resign because of failing health. Manuel Velasco Suárez quoted him as saying, "In every way, life has smiled at me. Now I must accept whatever may come."

He eventually became unable to walk, and after an emergency tracheotomy, he lost his voice. Enrique Krauze exclaimed in one of his books, "Gone was the voice of a once great orator."

Plagued with migraines during his adult life, he was diagnosed with several cerebral aneurysms, and after falling into a coma, he died in Mexico City 1969 of an aneurysm.

López Mateos was initially buried in the Panteón Jardín in Mexico City, and his wife, Eva Sámano, was buried next to him, after her death in 1984. When Carlos Salinas de Gortari became president of Mexico (1988–1994), however, he had the remains of López Mateos and his wife exhumed and moved to López Mateos's birthplace in Mexico State. A monument to the late president was erected there. This unusual step was likely due to Salinas' family animus toward López Mateos. Salinas's father Raúl Salinas Lozano had been a cabinet minister in López Mateos's government and was passed over for the party nomination to be the next president of Mexico. The town is now formally named Ciudad López Mateos.

== See also ==
- List of heads of state of Mexico

== Notes ==
Senate of the Republic (Mexico)
Preceded by Alfonso Flores	Senator for the State of Mexico; 1946–1952	Succeeded by Alfredo del Mazo Vélez
Political offices
Preceded by Manuel Ramírez Vázquez	Secretary of Labor and Social Welfare; 1952–1957	Succeeded by Salomón González Blanco
Preceded by Adolfo Ruiz Cortines	President of Mexico; 1958–1964	Succeeded by Gustavo Díaz Ordaz
Party political offices
Preceded by Adolfo Ruiz Cortines	PRI presidential candidate 1958 (won)	Succeeded by Gustavo Díaz Ordaz
