= The Cotton-Pickers =

1926 novel by B. Traven

- Author: B. Traven
- Publication date: 1926
- English publication date: 1956

The Cotton-Pickers is a 1926 novel by B. Traven.

== Plot ==
Gale is an itinerant who works jobs as a cotton picker, baker, cowboy, and oil rigger. He participates in a number of successive, spontaneous strikes without organized unions. He thinks of Guatemala and Argentina often.

== Publication ==
Vorwärts, the Social Democratic Party of Germany's newspaper, published a serialized version of The Cotton-Pickers as Die Baumwollpflücker between June 21 and July 2, 1925. Büchergilde Gutenberg published a modified version as a full-length book, Der Wobbly (The Wobbly). Traven was influenced by the Wobblies (Industrial Workers of the World) in Mexico as he arrived in 1924.

Eleanor Brockett translated the book into English for Robert Hale in 1956.

== Bibliography ==
- Hagemann, E. R. (1959). "A Checklist of the Work of B. Traven and the Critical Estimates and Biographical Essays on Him; together with a Brief Biography". The Papers of the Bibliographical Society of America. 53 (1): 37–67. doi:10.1086/pbsa.53.1.24299487. ISSN 0006-128X. JSTOR 24299487. S2CID 164163742.
- Kley, Martin (2012). "Mexico and Weimar's Anti-Authoritarian Socialist Imagination: Storytelling, Working, and 'Unworking' in B. Traven". Modern Language Studies. 41 (2): 10–35. ISSN 0047-7729. JSTOR 41445163.
- Schürer, Ernst; Jenkins, Philip, eds. (1987). "B. Traven and the Wobblies". B. Traven: Life and Work. Pennsylvania State University Press. pp. 199–215. ISBN 978-0-271-00382-5.
- Treverton, Edward N. (1999). B. Traven: A Bibliography. Lanham, MD: Scarecrow Press. pp. 31–. ISBN 978-0-8108-3610-5.
