= The White Rose (Traven novel) =

1929 novel by B. Traven

- First edition (Published by Büchergilde Gutenberg)
- Author: B. Traven
- Language: German
- Genre: Fiction
- Published: 1929
- Publication place: Germany

The White Rose is a novel by B. Traven, first published in 1929. Originally published in German by Münchener Post, the first English translation appeared in 1979.

== Plot ==
The novel concerns the efforts of Condor Oil, a (fictional) American oil company, to purchase a Mexican ranch from its unwilling owner.
