= B. Traven: The Life Behind the Legends =

1987 biography

- Author: Karl S. Guthke
- Original title: B. Traven: Biographie eines Rätsels
- Translator: Robert C. Sprung
- Subject: Biography
- Publisher: Büchergilde Gutenberg
- Publication date: 1987
- English publication date: 1991
- Pages: 840

B. Traven: The Life Behind the Legends is a biography of the novelist B. Traven by Karl Guthke. Originally published in German as B. Traven: Biographie eines Rätsels in 1987, the book was translated into English by Robert Sprung in 1991.

== Bibliography ==
- Furness, Raymond (1990). "Review of B. Traven: Biographie eines Rätsels". The Modern Language Review. 85 (4): 1033–1034. doi:10.2307/3732770. ISSN 0026-7937. JSTOR 3732770.
- Payne, Kenneth (1993). "Review of B. Traven: A Vision of Mexico; B. Traven: The Life Behind the Legends". Australasian Journal of American Studies. 12 (2): 76–78. ISSN 1838-9554. JSTOR 41053699.
- Pfanner, Helmut F. (1991). "Review of B. Traven: Biographie eines Rätsels". Monatshefte (in German). 83 (1): 83–85. ISSN 0026-9271. JSTOR 30184480.
- Schutte, Lilith (1988). "Review of B. Traven: Biographie eines Rätsels". German Studies Review (in German). 11 (3): 526–527. doi:10.2307/1430544. ISSN 0149-7952. JSTOR 1430544.
- Strelka, Joseph P. (1989). "Review of B. Traven. Biographie eines Rätsels". Colloquia Germanica (in German). 22 (3/4): 369–370. ISSN 0010-1338. JSTOR 23981179.
- Weigel, Robert (1992). "Review of B. Traven. The Life Behind the Legends". Colloquia Germanica (in German). 25 (2): 179–180. ISSN 0010-1338. JSTOR 23980894.
