= B. Traven =

Novelist

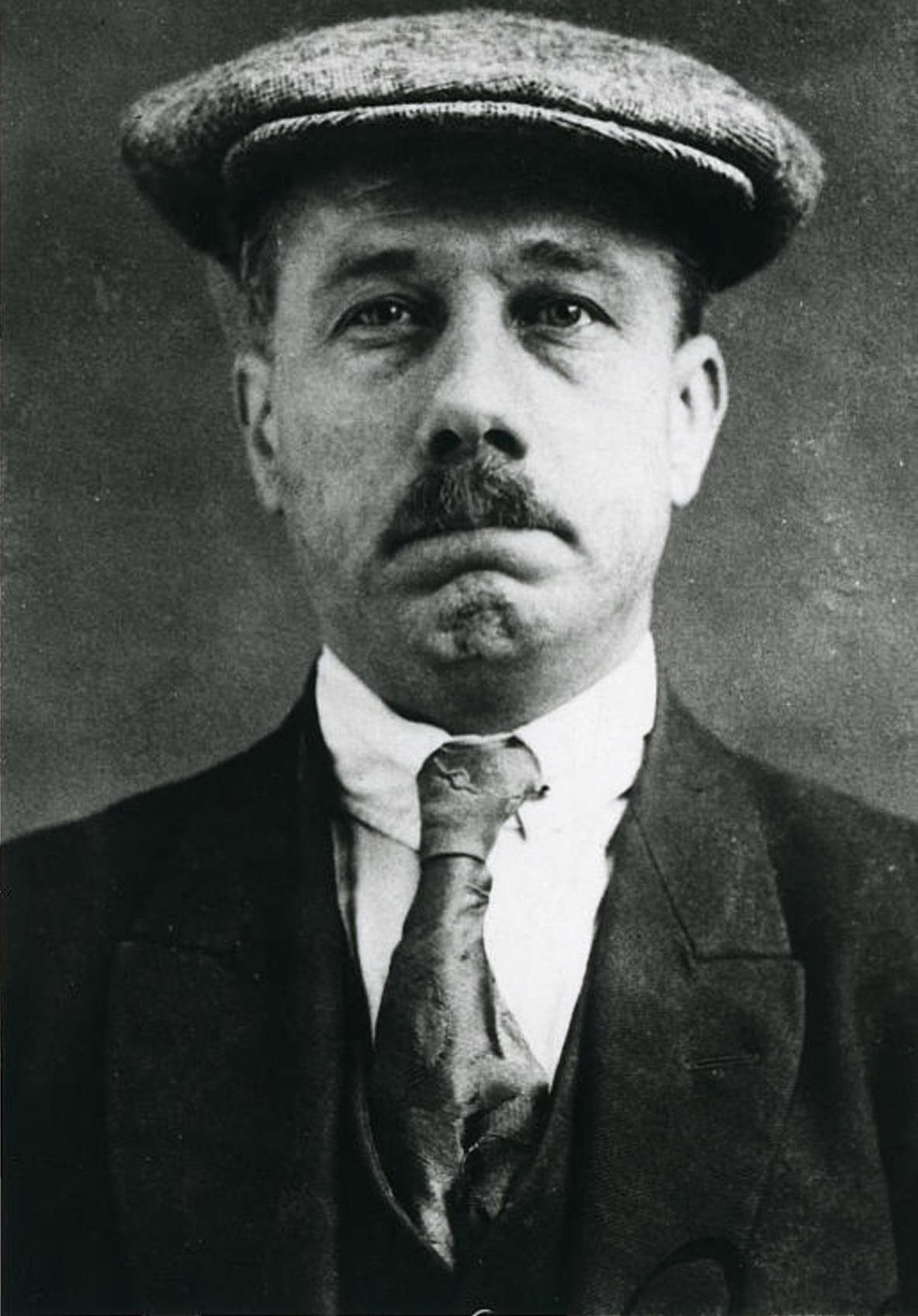
- Ret Marut mug shot taken in London (1923); Ret Marut has been generally accepted as the name used in Germany by the same person who used the name B. Traven in Mexico.
- Died: 26 March 1969 (aged 87) (based on 1882 birth); Mexico City, Mexico
- Occupation: Writer
- Children: Rosa Elena Montés de Oca Luján, María Eugenia Montes de Oca Luján (stepdaughters)
- Writing career
- Notable works: The Death Ship; The Treasure of the Sierra Madre; The Jungle Novels

B. Traven (German: [ˈbeː ˈtʁaːvn̩]) was the pen name of a novelist, presumed to be German, known for his novels on injustice and exploitation around the world, and especially in Mexico. His name, nationality, date and place of birth have been subject to dispute. One certainty about Traven's life is that he lived under the name of Ret Marut in Germany until 1923 and arrived in 1924 in Mexico, where the majority of his fiction is also set, and where he died under the name B. Traven.

His most famous work The Treasure of the Sierra Madre (1927) is set in Mexico, as is the film adaptation which won three Academy Awards in 1949.

== Life ==
There have been many hypotheses on the paternity of B. Traven, some of them wildly fantastic. It has been generally accepted that Traven was also known as Ret Marut, a German stage actor and anarchist, who edited an anarchist magazine in Germany called Der Ziegelbrenner (The Brick Burner). Traven's widow Rosa Elena Luján announced that her husband and Marut were one and the same in a statement after his death in 1969. Marut was a pseudonym possibly related to his real name as well as to Hindu mythology.

Marut's career as an actor and later pamphleteer has been traced from 1907 by Rolf Recknagel and in detail by Karl Guthke, his most complete biographer.

Of the names suggested for the author, one was traceable to a documented birth. This was Hermann Albert Otto Maximilian Feige, born in Schwiebus in Brandenburg on 23 February 1882. An identity document with this name and date were given by Marut to the British police in London in 1923 after he had been arrested as an unregistered alien. Traven frequently used identity papers borrowed or obtained from friends or acquaintances like the Feige document: a similar borrowed identity document has been found in the Traven archive. The Feige identification has been challenged, including by representatives of the B. Traven Estate who advanced an alternative claim that "Moritz Rathenau", an alleged illegitimate son of industrial tycoon Emil Rathenau, was the author (see Identity for discussion and sources). In December 1990 Traven's stepdaughter Maria Eugenia Montes de Oca Luján and her husband Timothy Heyman were told by Gabriel Figueroa, the renowned Mexican cinematographer, one of Traven's closest friends in Mexico, that Traven was the illegitimate son of Emil Rathenau, the founder of AEG, and Helen Mareck, an Irish actress, and that his name was Moritz Rathenau. Heyman subsequently investigated this revelation and published an article advancing the claim in the Mexican magazine Letras Libres in May 2019, citing onomastic arguments (e.g., letter-rearrangement similarities among "Ret Marut," "B. Traven," and "Moritz Rathenau") and materials he attributes to the Gabriel Figueroa family archive.

Traven's novels and short stories became very popular as early as the interwar period, were translated into multiple languages, and retained this popularity after the Second World War. Most of B. Traven's books were published in German first, with their English editions appearing later. However, the author always claimed the English versions were the original ones and that the German versions were only their translations. This claim is mostly treated by Traven scholars as a diversion or a joke, although there are those who accept it.

In 1957, Traven married Rosa Elena Luján, who was divorced and had two daughters. The family lived in Mexico City. Luján worked as Traven's translator since 1953 and as his business agent. In 1966, he gave a rare interview to the Mexican magazine Siempre!, where he discussed his identity and ancestry. Traven stated that he had been born in the United States to Scandinavian parents, not German ones, and that he had lived in Germany in the past, where the Third Reich had banned his books and confiscated his German earnings. He also said that his business name was Hal Croves. Traven died on March 26, 1969, in his home in Mexico City. Shortly thereafter, his widow Elena Luján revealed, as instructed by Traven, that he had used the names Traven Torsvan, B. Traven and Hal Croves. A notarized identity statement confirmed the facts. Luján stated he also used the name Ret Marut.

== Works ==
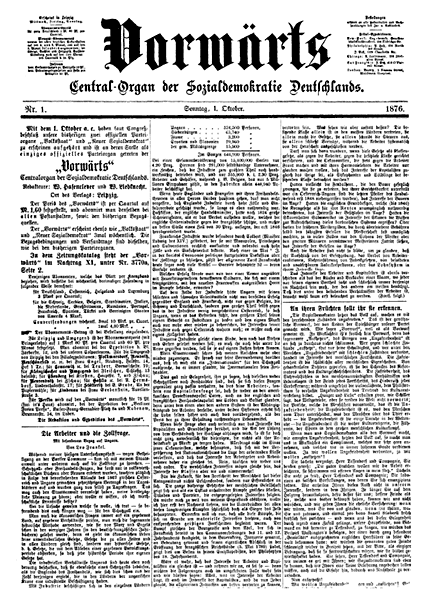
Vorwärts daily, in which B. Traven's first short story and his first novel were published (front page of the first issue of the newspaper from 1876)

The writer with the pen name B. Traven appeared on the German literary scene in 1925, when the Berlin daily Vorwärts, the organ of the Social Democratic Party of Germany, published the first short story signed with this pseudonym on February 28. During the same year, it published Traven's first novel, Die Baumwollpflücker (The Cotton-Pickers), which appeared in installments in June and July. The expanded book edition was published in May 1926 by the Berlin-based Buchmeister publishing house, which was owned by the left-leaning trade-unions-affiliated book sales club Büchergilde Gutenberg.The title of the first book edition was Der Wobbly, a common name for members of the industrial unionist Industrial Workers of the World; in later editions the original title Die Baumwollpflücker was restored. In the book, Traven introduced for the first time the figure of Gerard Gales, who looks for a job in different occupations in Mexico, often consorting with suspicious characters and witnessing capitalistic exploitation, nevertheless not losing his will to fight and striving to draw joy from life.

In April of the same year (1926), Büchergilde Gutenberg, which was Traven's publishing house until 1939, published Das Totenschiff (The Death Ship). The main character of the novel is also Gerard Gales, a sailor who, having lost his documents, virtually forfeits his identity, the right to normal life and a home country and, consequently, is forced to work as a stoker's helper in extremely difficult conditions on board a "death ship" (or coffin ship), which sails on suspicious voyages around the European and African coasts. The novel is an accusation of the greed of capitalist employers and bureaucracy of officials who deport Gale from the countries where he seeks refuge. In the light of findings by Traven's biographers, The Death Ship may be regarded as a novel with autobiographical elements. Assuming that B. Traven is identical with the revolutionary Ret Marut, there is a clear parallel between the fate of Gales and the life of the writer himself, devoid of his home country, who might have been forced to work in a boiler room of a steamer on a voyage from Europe to Mexico.

Traven's best known novel is The Treasure of the Sierra Madre, published first in German in 1927 as Der Schatz der Sierra Madre. The book is again set in Mexico, where its main characters are a group of American adventurers and gold seekers. In 1948 the film of the book, directed by John Huston, was released under the same title (The Treasure of the Sierra Madre) . Starring Humphrey Bogart and Walter Huston, it was a great critical success, and in 1949 it won three Academy Awards, for best director and best script (John Huston), and for best supporting actor (Walter Huston).

The figure of Gerard Gales returned in Traven's next book, The Bridge in the Jungle (Die Brücke im Dschungel), which was serialized in Vorwärts in 1927 and published in an extended book form in 1929. In the novel, Traven first dealt in detail with the question of the First Nations in South and North America and the conflicting values and traditions between white settler cultures and indigenous cultures throughout the Americas; these themes detailing the problems of colonization dominated what became known as the Jungle Novels published in the 1930s.

The 1930s are mainly the period in which Traven wrote and published the Jungle Novels – a series of six novels consisting of The Carreta (Der Karren, 1931), Government (Regierung, 1931), March to the Monteria (Der Marsch ins Reich der Caoba, 1933), Trozas (Die Troza, 1936), The Rebellion of the Hanged (Die Rebellion der Gehenkten, 1936), and General from the Jungle (Ein General kommt aus dem Dschungel, with a Swedish translation published in 1939 and the German original in 1940). The novels describe the life of indigenous Mexicans in the state of Chiapas in the early 20th century who are forced to work under inhumane conditions at clearing mahogany in labour camps (monterias) in the jungle; the working and living conditions lead to a rebellion and the outbreak of the Mexican Revolution.

Traven's last novel, published in 1960, was Aslan Norval, the story of an American millionairess who is married to an aging businessman and at the same time in love with a young man; she intends to build a canal running across the United States as an alternative for the nuclear arms race and space race. The subject and the language of the novel, which were completely different from the writer's other works, resulted in its rejection for a long time by publishers who doubted Traven's authorship; the novel was accused of being "trivial" and "pornographic". The book was only accepted for publication after its thorough stylistic editing by Johannes Schönherr, who adapted its language to the "Traven style".

Apart from his twelve novels, B. Traven authored many short stories, some of which remain unpublished. Besides the already mentioned Macario, the writer adapted the Mexican legend about The Creation of the Sun and the Moon (Sonnen-Schöpfung, with a Czech translation published in 1934 and the German original in 1936). The first collection of Traven's short stories, entitled Der Busch, appeared in 1928; its second, enlarged edition was published in 1930. From the 1940s onwards many of his short stories also appeared in magazines and anthologies in different languages.

Having been trained in photography by Edward Weston and Tina Modotti, in 1926 Traven was hired as the photographer for an expedition to Chiapas led by Enrique Palacios of the UNM (Mexican National University) with the purpose of exterminating the locust which plagued the crops of the communities living in the state. After the expedition ended in August, 1926, Traven chose to stay in the state and returned to the state several times in successive years, to study and write about its people. The result was an anthropological book about Chiapas, Land of Springtime (Land des Frühlings) published in 1928 by Büchergilder with 64 photos and captions produced by the author. The book consolidated his pivot from Europe related problems of governance, identity, bureaucracy and capitalism, to the condemnation of the oppression of Mexico's indigenous people. The six jungle novels were the result of his decision to communicate his beliefs and ideals through fiction, just as he had used the Death Ship to express his views on injustice, inequality, capitalism and oppression in the developed world.

=== Themes ===
B. Traven's major writings are classified as adventure novels with proletarian themes.

An anarchist element of rebellion often lies at the centre of the novel's action. The hero's rejection of his degrading living conditions frequently serves as motive, and broad emphasis is placed upon the efforts of the oppressed to liberate themselves. Apart from that, there are virtually no political programmes in Traven's books; his clearest manifesto may be the general anarchist demand "¡Tierra y Libertad!" in the Jungle Novels. Professional politicians, including ones who sympathize with the left, are usually shown in a negative light, if shown at all. Despite this, Traven's books are par excellence political works. Although the author does not offer any positive programme, he always indicates the cause of suffering of his heroes. This source of suffering, deprivation, poverty and death is for him capitalism, personified in the deliberations of the hero of The Death Ship as Caesar Augustus Capitalismus.

In his presentation of oppression and exploitation, Traven did not limit himself to the criticism of capitalism; in the centre of his interest there were racist persecutions of Mexican Indians. These motifs, mainly visible in the Jungle Novels, were unusual in the 1930s. Most leftist intellectuals, despite their negative attitude to European and American imperialism, did not know about or were not interested in persecution of natives in Africa, Asia or South America. It has been argued that Traven deserves credit for drawing public attention to these questions, long before anti-colonial movements and civil rights movement in the United States.

== Identity ==
Supposed portrait of B. Traven (Traven Torsvan, 1926)

Traven submitted his works himself or through his representatives for publication from Mexico to Europe by post and gave a Mexican post office box as his return address. The copyright holder named in his books was "B. Traven, Tamaulipas, Mexico". Neither the European nor the American publishers of the writer ever met him personally or, at least, the people with whom they negotiated the publication and later also the filming of his books always maintained they were only Traven's literary agents; the identity of the writer himself was to be kept secret. This reluctance to offer any biographical information was explained by B. Traven in words which were to become one of his best-known quotations: "The creative person should have no other biography than his works."

From early on, investigators proposed competing life stories behind the pen name. Over time, many scholars came to accept that Traven had earlier lived in Germany as the stage actor and anarchist editor "Ret Marut," who fled after the suppression of the Bavarian Soviet Republic in 1919; but where Marut came from—and whether he had a prior legal identity—remained contested.

In the late 1970s, two BBC journalists, Will Wyatt and Robert Robinson, brought new archival evidence to light in a BBC documentary (19 December 1978) and in Wyatt's book The Man Who Was B. Traven (U.S. title The Secret of the Sierra Madre), which appeared in 1980. Drawing on U.S. State Department and British Foreign Office files, they traced Ret Marut's failed 1923 attempt to enter Canada and his detention in London, where he gave his legal name as Hermann Otto Albert Maximilian Feige, born 23 February 1882 in Schwiebus (now Świebodzin); records and surviving siblings supported the match. The identification was taken up sympathetically by some early commentators and in the press, and it continues to be noted in reference works. For a time, however, many Traven specialists (though Ernst Schürer was a notable exception) remained skeptical or dismissive of Wyatt's case.

In 2012, literary scholar Jan-Christoph Hauschild published the book B. Traven – Die unbekannten Jahre which substantially expanded the documentary basis for Wyatt's identification. In a detailed review of the book, Guthke, who had previously rejected Wyatt's theory, wrote:

Hauschild's 2012 book [...] presupposes the equation Feige = Marut as argued by Wyatt's research (not shared by "most Travenologists" [p. 30]). However, it contributes hitherto unknown biographical material that supports it, namely, in addition to the extensive documentation of Feige's life phase 1905–1907 [...], also evidence for Feige's handwriting [...] which he finds identical to Marut's (p. 85), as well as [...] the reference (p. 56) to an article by Wyatt in the London Daily Telegraph of January 28, 1995, not noted by Germanic bibliographies and therefore by Travenology, in which expert opinion is cited that the London police photos of the 41-year-old Marut and the photographs of Feige at ages approximately 14 and 22 represent the same person or "a very close blood relative." This fundamentally changes the evidentiary situation compared to Wyatt's 1980 book. [...] Hauschild also draws such connecting lines from Feige to Marut and Traven and their works elsewhere. These are, each in itself, of varying persuasiveness, but taken together and against the background of the references to photo identity (Wyatt 1995) and handwriting identity brought into discussion by Hauschild, they become plausible. The evidentiary situation has changed, as stated, through these three factors compared to the status of 1980, however desirable the sigillum veri of an authentic document would be.

— Guthke, Karl S. (2013). "Jan-Christoph Hauschild, B. Traven – Die unbekannten Jahre". Arbitrium. 31 (2): 244–253. doi:10.1515/arb-2013-0009.

Other reviewers likewise judged Hauschild's archival reconstruction to substantially strengthen Wyatt's identification. Günter Dammann, Professor of Modern German Literature at the University of Hamburg, wrote that Guthke's earlier rejection of the Feige thesis had been "the communis opinio in Traven research, which is now vehemently overturned by the present publication," and that with Hauschild's research "the missing link was finally found." Even before the 2012 monograph, the second edition of Killy Literaturlexikon (2011), drawing on Hauschild's earlier article, classified the identification as "(probably)" proven, if "not entirely undisputed."

In 2019 Timothy Heyman—co-manager of the B. Traven Estate and husband of Traven's stepdaughter—revived a different claim: that Traven was "Moritz Rathenau," the illegitimate son of Emil Rathenau (founder of AEG) and thus half-brother of politician Walther Rathenau. Heyman attributes the information to translator Esperanza López Mateos via cinematographer Gabriel Figueroa; he adds further family-archive details and onomastic arguments (for example, anagrams of "Moritz Rathenau" in "Ret Marut" and "B. Traven"). The proposal has drawn attention in subsequent commentary. However, unlike the Feige identification, which rests on independent civil and police records, no independent documentation has been published confirming the birth or existence of a "Moritz Rathenau," and the theory remains controversial.

Writing in 2018, Anabel Aliaga-Buchenau, Professor of German at the University of North Carolina at Charlotte, stated that "[t]he prevailing scholarly consensus is that B. Traven was born as Otto Feige in Schwiebus, Germany, to a father who worked in a brick factory."

== See also ==
- Anarchism in Germany
- Proletarian literature

== List of works ==
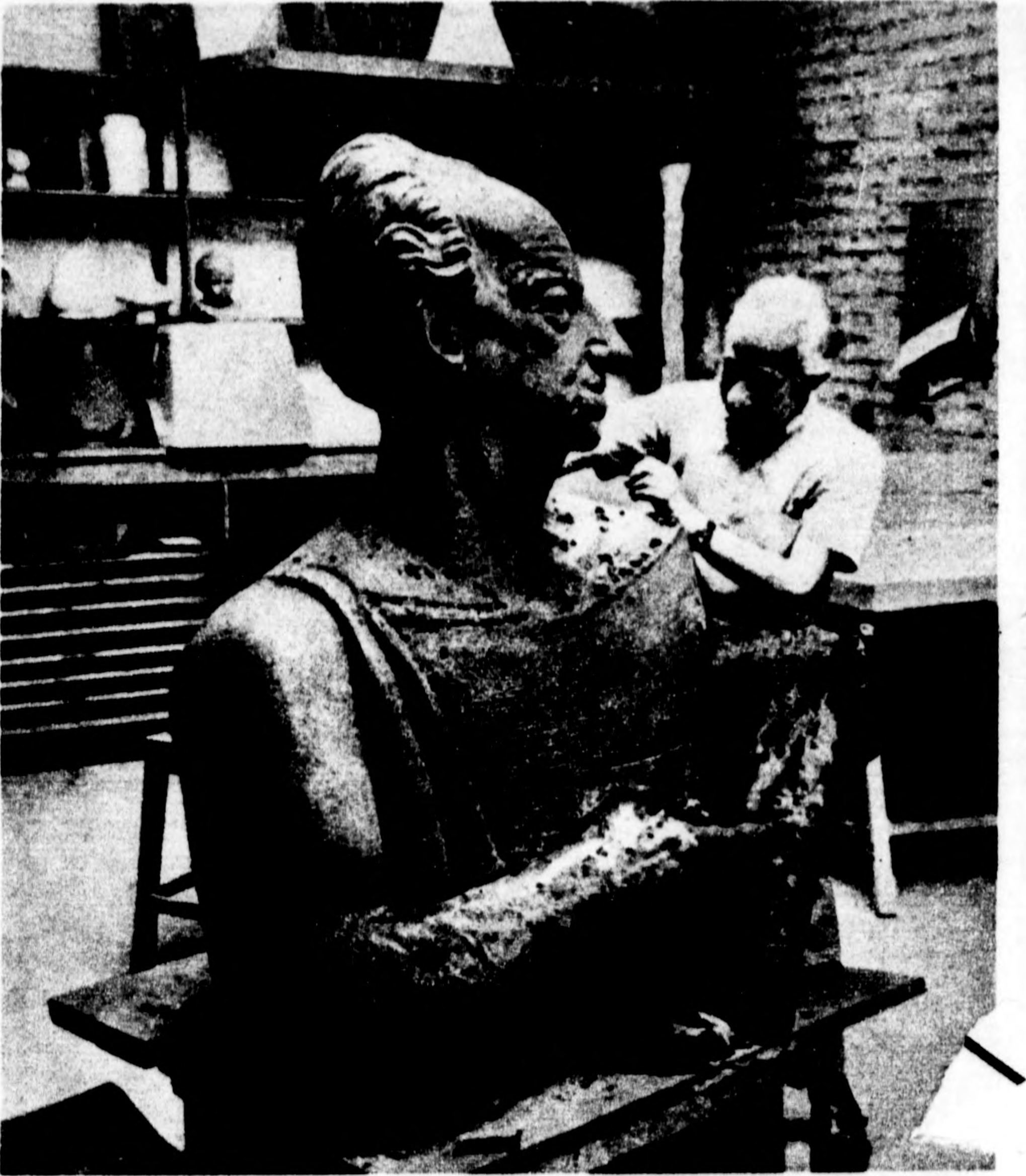
Artist Federico Canessi at work on a bust of B. Traven in 1929 in Mexico City

=== Stand-alone works ===
- The Cotton-Pickers (1926; retitled from The Wobbly) ISBN 1-56663-075-4
- The Treasure of the Sierra Madre (1927; first English pub. 1935) ISBN 0-8090-0160-8
- The Death Ship: The Story of an American Sailor (1926; first English pub. 1934) ISBN 1-55652-110-3
- The White Rose (1929; first full English pub 1979) ISBN 0-85031-370-8
- The Night Visitor and Other Stories (English pub. 1967) ISBN 1-56663-039-8
- The Bridge in the Jungle (1929; first English pub. 1938) ISBN 1-56663-063-0
- Land des Frühlings (1928) – travel book – untranslated
- Aslan Norval (1960) ISBN 978-3-257-05016-5 (English translation published as ebook 2020 ISBN 9780374722135)
- Stories by the Man Nobody Knows (1961)
- The Kidnapped Saint and Other Stories (1975)
- The Creation of the Sun and the Moon (1968)

=== The Jungle Novels ===
- Government (1931) ISBN 1-56663-038-X
- The Carreta (1931, released in Germany 1930) ISBN 1-56663-045-2
- March to the Monteria (a.k.a. March to Caobaland) (1933) ISBN 1-56663-046-0
- Trozas (1936) ISBN 1-56663-219-6
- The Rebellion of the Hanged (1936; first English pub. 1952) ISBN 1-56663-064-9
- General from the Jungle (1940) ISBN 1-56663-076-2

=== Collected stories ===
- Canasta de cuentos mexicanos (or Canasta of Mexican Stories, 1956, Mexico City, translated from the English by Rosa Elena Luján) ISBN 968-403-320-6

=== Films based on works ===
- The Treasure of the Sierra Madre, 1948
- The Rebellion of the Hanged, 1954
- Canasta de cuentos mexicanos, 1955
- The Argonauts (Episode of Cheyenne TV series), 1955
- Der Banditendoktor (TV film), 1957
- The Death Ship, 1959
- Macario (story "The Third Guest"), 1960
- Rosa Blanca (novel La Rosa Blanca), 1961
- Días de otoño (story "Frustration"), 1963
- Au verre de l'amitié, 1970
- Die Baumwollpflücker (TV series), 1970
- The Bridge in the Jungle, 1971
- Kuolemanlaiva (TV film), 1983
- The Rebellion of the Hanged, 1986

=== Notable illustrations of works ===
- Dödsskeppet (The Death Ship), Atlantis, Stockholm 1978, and Het dodenschip, Meulenhoff, Amsterdam 1978. Inkdrawings by the Swedish artist Torsten Billman. Unpublished in English.

=== Works by Ret Marut ===
- To the Honorable Miss S... and other stories (1915–19; English publication 1981) ISBN 0-88208-131-4
- Die Fackel des Fürsten (novel, Nottingham: Edition Refugium 2009) ISBN 0-9506476-2-4;ISBN 978-0-9506476-2-3
- Der Mann Site und die grünglitzernde Frau – (novel, Nottingham: Edition Refugium 2009) ISBN 0-9506476-3-2; ISBN 978-0-9506476-3-0
- Jörg Thunecke (ed.): B. Traven, the Writer Nottingham: Edition Refugium 2004.
- Jörg Thunecke: Revolutionäre Ungeduld oder die Geschichte einer Illusion. Die Geschichte des Anarchisten Ret Marut während der Münchener Räterepublik 1918/19 Edition Refugium, Nottingham 2021.
- Jörg Thunecke: 100 Jahre B. Traven Edition Refugium, Nottingham 2026, ISBN 978-3-9801652-4-2.
