= The Treasure of the Sierra Madre =

1927 adventure novel by B. Traven

- 1st edition
- Author: B. Traven
- Original title: Der Schatz der Sierra Madre
- Language: German
- Genre: Adventure novel
- Publisher: Büchergilde Gutenberg
- Publication date: 1927
- Publication place: Germany
- English publication date: 1935
- Pages: 213

The Treasure of the Sierra Madre (German: Der Schatz der Sierra Madre) is a 1927 adventure novel by German author B. Traven, whose identity remains unknown. In the book, two destitute American men in Mexico of the 1920s join an older American prospector in a search for gold. John Huston adapted the book as a 1948 film of the same name.

== Historical setting ==
The novel is set in the decade following the global upheavals of the First World War and social revolutions in Russia and Mexico. The United States is an emerging economic and political power. European and US corporations are aggressively seeking foreign markets, natural resources and cheap labor. Elements within the Catholic Church are struggling to retain their religious freedom as anticlerical Mexican administrations institute social reforms, including an eight hour workday, as well as programs to increase literacy and healthcare availability.

== Plot ==
The author employs a third person-omniscient in a dramatic-progressive structure, where Howard is the focal character. Three stories within a story provide historical and social significance for the outer narrative.

=== Summary ===
The story opens in the oil boomtown of Tampico, Mexico in the early 1920s. Dobbs, an expatriate from the US is generally unemployed, and works informally. He is living at the Hotel Oso Negro (the Black Bear Hotel), a vermin-infested flophouse.

Seeking higher wages, Dobbs joins a rigging crew as a roughneck, run by American contractor Pat McCormick. A bidder on drilling projects, McCormick has a reputation for fast-paced operations and high productivity. He postures as an anti-capitalist and comrade to revolutionaries to win the loyalty of his newly arrived European laborers, who are sympathetic to Bolshevism. Mexican labor is never hired due to their national eight-hour day provision.

==== Story within a story: The Legend of La Mina Agua Verde ====
One day at the Oso Negro, Dobbs encounters Howard, an elderly, loquacious gold prospector. The old man lectures several bunkmates on the perils of striking it rich. Discovered in quantity, he avers, gold distorts a man's estimate of vice and virtue. Invariably he succumbs to greed, and no amount of gold will satisfy him. Howard tells the story of La Mina Agua de Verde (the Green Water Mine), as told to him by a Harry Tilton, former mentor and fellow-prospector. The historic diggings are said to be located on today's border between the American state of Arizona and the Mexican state of Sonora.

The social history associated with the mine presents a litany of horrors, beginning with the Aztecs and proceeding to the forced labor of indigenous people by the Spanish conquerors. The complicity of the Catholic Church in maintaining order among the Indian workers is detailed, including their authorization of torture. A malediction is placed on the mine. In 1762 local inhabitants launch a revolt, exterminating the Spanish officials presiding over the slave laborers. Spain’s military retaliates with a program of terror, burning villages and hanging women and children attempting to flee the oppression. A pattern of retaliatory killings escalates, until the Indian insurgents obliterate the mine and utterly transform the landscape to conceal any evidence of its existence. Attempts by Spanish authorities to relocate the diggings fail. The legend of the cursed La Mina Agua Verde persists nonetheless in subsequent decades, revived when the United States takes possession of northern Mexico in the 1840s. The fate of those who seek the fabled mine ends in madness or death.

During the 1870s, three American students from a distant college are on vacation in Arizona, among them Harry Tilton. As guests of a local priest, they secretly copy a map of La Mina Agua Verde – the Green Water Mine – found in the cleric's library. After weeks of relentless excavation, a three-man crew unearths some rich gold-laden ore. They attempt to conceal their discovery from their fellow prospectors, but the deception is exposed. Their vengeful comrades murder them. The mine proves to contain immense quantities of gold. Harry Tilton, satisfied with his share of the gold, departs from the dig early. He settles down on a farm in his native Kansas. Unbeknownst to him, the remaining 11 men are massacred by bands of Indians, and the mine sinks back into legend. Near the turn of the century, gold fever grips the world with the great gold rushes in the Alaska, Australia and South Africa. Tilton is coerced, against his better judgment, to lead an expedition to relocate the legendary Green Water Mine. The members of the prospecting party include the much younger Howard. Dobbs shares the legend of the Green Water Mine with Curtin, and has a premonition that he may be subject to a gold curse. Curtin discounts any “curse” associated with gold and holds that a person's character determines its effects.

With many oil fields beginning to shut down operation in Mexico and relocate to other countries, the two men are impelled to partner with Howard to seek gold. With about $600 in pooled funds, the trio depart immediately by train for the city of Durango, in the Mexican interior, where they locate placer gold. The men intend to pose as professional game hunters seeking commercial hides. As the fortune piles up, the prospectors' class identity shifts. With property to defend, they adopt a bourgeois outlook, suspicious of the have-nots. They cease to be proletarians. Even as the men share the same hardships, they do not forge friendships, merely alliances for profit. Their willingness to rescue a partner in distress is self-serving: the loss of one man to death or injury could cripple the profitable enterprise.

While on a final supply run to the local village, Curtin is accosted by an American newcomer visiting the store. The man insinuates that there is much gold in the nearby mountains; Curtin emphatically denies it. The stranger guesses the significance of Curtin's aloofness and trails him into the mountain wilderness. The stranger informs the men that the area is unfit for commercial hunting – rather, they are sitting on a gold field. The prospectors return to their tent intensely suspicious of the man's purpose. They permit him to stay the night. The stranger introduces himself as Robert W. Lacaud of Phoenix, Arizona, “Tech, Pasadena”.

When Howard goes to check the burros, he spots mounted men in the distance approaching the encampment. Lacaud warns the miners that the horsemen are dangerous bandits, led by the notorious Gold Hat. Tipped off by locals, they are searching for the “hunter” (Curtin) to seize his guns and ammunition. Lacaud assures his companions that their lives are in imminent danger. As they anxiously watch the bandits slowly ascend the trail, Lacaud relates to them the story of Gold Hat, conveyed to him by a local nobleman, don Genaro Montereal, while visiting his estate the previous week.

==== Story within a story: Lacaud’s narrative of an incident in the Viva Nuestro Rey Cristo Uprising ====
In a remote region of western Mexico, a passenger train stops to pick up mail at a small station. At nightfall, twenty mestizos, dressed in peasant garb, board the train. When the train reaches full speed the mestizos begin shooting at the occupants: men, women and children are indiscriminately slaughtered.

Stopping the train, the bandits and their 200 confederates waiting along the tracks, carry away the loot before setting all the carriages on fire. The trains’ engineer, though mortally wounded, escapes with the locomotive to the nearby depot. A rescue train is sent and the outlaws are driven away. The federal military forces in the adjoining states are mobilized to pursue the perpetrators. Two Catholic priests are apprehended and admit to directing the attack on the train. The bandits, or rebels, as the case may be, are poor and politically ignorant agrarians who perform these deeds in struggle between the Catholic Church and the government of Mexico.

Lacaud concludes his report, informing his cohorts that the approaching bandits, led by Gold Hat, are the last surviving members of the outlaws that had joined in the deadly train assault. Gold Hat and his men enter the campsite looking for a lone hunter. Failing to find him, they quarrel and consider returning to the village. As the 20-man bandit group prepare to spend the night, one member discovers Curtin in the trench. Gold Hat tries to lure Curtin from his foxhole with promises of a gold watch. Rebutted, the outlaws construct movable barriers to assault the trench. Before they can deploy them, a company of genuine mounted police, alerted by villagers, appear and pursue Gold Hat and his gang as they flee the encampment.

With the ordeal over, Howard, Dobbs and Curtin express a desire to terminate operations and return immediately to civilization, Howard confides to Dobbs and Curtin that Lacaud is an eccentric “eternal” – a prospector who becomes obsessed over a coveted diggings and will not abandoned even after decades of failure. They leave him to his fate. Howard directs the dismantling of their mine so as to leave no trace of its existence. Howard warns his cohorts that the next phase – transferring the gold dust back to civilization – may be the riskiest phase and they become preoccupied with its challenges. Howard illustrates these dangers in his tale of the Dona Maria Mine.

==== Story within a Story: Legend of Dona Catalina Maria de Rodriguez and the “Dona Maria” Mine. ====
The story is set in the late 18th Century in Chihuahuan Desert region of Northern Mexico.

A Chiricahuan chieftain named Aguila Bravo (Brave Eagle) lives a contented life. The chieftains’ only son, approaching adulthood, is handsome and intelligent, but has been born blind. This is his father’s sole regret. A parasitic monk, who live off the hospitality of the local villagers, promises to provide the chieftain with the method by which to restore his son’s vision, for a fee. The secret, he tells father, is to appeal to the heavenly Nuestra Senora de Guadalupe (Our Lady of Guadalupe), on behalf of the Catholic Church.

The chief, as instructed, makes a 1400-mile pilgrimage on foot to Mexico City in company with his wife and son, carrying all his money and jewelry as an offering to the Saint. The family travels the final three miles on their knees to the holy site of Cerrito de Tepeyac (Hill of Tepeyac), saying Ave Marias as they go. For three days, the chief and his dependents pray before the icons, without food or water. Nothing happens. Aguila Bravo, hoping to appease the Saint, offers his cattle and next year’s crops so as to induce a miracle. After seven more days, encouraged by the clergy, the chief offers to transfer his entire estate to the church to obtain eyesight for his son. No miracle takes place. The boy’s health begins to fail due to the privations they’ve endured, and the father fears for his life. Exasperated, he renounces his faith in the Virgin. The priests accuse him of blasphemy and warn that he may be tortured by a court of the holy Inquisition. The fathers of the church explain that the Virgin has withheld her intervention because the chief has failed to perform the requisite number of Ave Marias, or perhaps took a sip of water in violation of the fast. He admits as much, and departs in disgust.

In Mexico City, he consults a doctor – a quack – named Don Manuel, who agrees to restore the boy’s eyesight, for a price, payable in gold. The two men strike a quid pro quo: if the doctor provides his son with sight, the chief will reveal the location of a rich gold and silver mine. A caveat allows the doctor to reverse the effects of the operation if the mine turns out to be a hoax. Spurred by the promise of great riches, Don Manuel fully succeeds in giving the boy sight. Aguila Bravo is good for his word. The location of the mine, long concealed by his ancestors despite cruel torture by Spanish invaders, is provided to Don Manuel for his personal enrichment. The mine proves to be rich in silver, less so in gold. Cunningly, Don Manuel transfers only small shipments to Mexico City to purchase food and provisions. He is fearful that church leaders might spread rumors that he doubted the miracle of Nuestra Senora de Guadalupe, torture him and confiscate his property. The staggering wealth of the mine is thus concealed; the bulk of the treasure is buried at the diggings.

Don Manuel abuses his Indian laborers, and in time, they rebel. His wife, Dona Maria, escapes, but her husband is killed in the uprising. The Indians take no further interest in the mine and return to their homes. The widow Dona Maria goes to bury her deceased spouse. She finds the hidden stockpiles of silver untouched.

Despite possessing this fortune, she determines to amass enough to become the richest woman on Earth. A daughter of impoverished city dwellers, she dreams of marrying into Spanish nobility of the highest rank. She reopens the mine, and makes generous donations to the Church so as to insure they do not molest the operations. The mine, meanwhile, continues to disgorge huge amounts of rich ore. At the remote diggings, she endures privations better than her husband, and handles her poorly paid employee adroitly. She adopts the manners of a hard-drinking wench, but impresses the visiting monks with her devoutness to the church.

Revolutionary movements in the late 18th century in Europe destabilize the social relations in the Americas, as Spain begins to lose its grip on its colonial holdings. Egalitarian political and economics are taking hold. Dona Maria’s mine is perpetually threatened with attack by desperados. She cleverly poses as a madwoman who seeks atonement through hard work, rather than a besieged member of the discredited elites. Before long, she becomes discontented with her primitive lifestyle and yearns for a more cultured existence. Her wealth is such that she can now realize her dream to marry into the Spanish nobility.

The silver and gold, smelted into bars, must be carried across 1400 miles across the Sierra Madre mountains and the Tierra Caliente to reach Mexico City. Dona Maria enlists two ex-soldiers from Spanish army to oversee the convoy, placing them in command of a detachment of armed Mestizos and a dozen Indian teamsters and 130 mules.

One of the soldier mutinies with the Mestizos, and he demands that Dona Maria marry him and make him master of the fortune. If she refuses, he threatens to rape her and divide the bullion with the mutineers. Unfazed, she spars with him verbally, then takes hold of a horsewhip, and brutally beats him until he collapses. She assaults the bewildered mutineers, and they submit to her authority. She orders the disloyal soldier hanged. Dona Maria bribes the loyal soldier, makes common cause with the Indian muleskinners, and thus maintains control of the convoy. She sustains her spirits by imagining a personal audience with the Pope.

Dona Maria arrives in Mexico City and instantly becomes a celebrity. The rich and powerful court her. With the silver and gold safely ensconced in the vaults of the King’s treasury, her wealth is secured – by the nobility. Dona Maria mysteriously disappears, never to be heard of again. Here, Howard ends his cautionary tale.

Curtin inquires as to whether the mine still holds riches, and if it could possibly be rediscovered. Howard disabuses the younger man: the mine is owned by an American outfit – the Dona Maria Mine Company. The operation yields ten times the ore extracted under Dona Catalina Maria de Rodriguez. Employees of the mine earn $40 a week.

Howard, Curtin, and Dobbs take leave of Lacaud and head for Durango. The threesome avoid populated areas and refrain from acting suspicious so as not to draw attention from locals. Passing through a tiny village, they are detained by Mexican officials. Expecting the worst – that they will be fined for operating an unregistered mine – the officials turn out to be medical technicians for the Health Commission vaccinating the residents for smallpox. The prospectors gladly submit to be inoculated and go their way.

Setting up camp, they are intercepted by a delegation of mounted indios. The farmers request that the American accompany them to their village: the son of one of the men has been pulled from a swimming hole unconscious and cannot be revived. Howard consents to accompany them to their village and examine the boy. There, he applies basic First Aid to the child and he recovers. The villagers regard Howard's powers as those of a medicine-man or magician.

Howard rejoins Dobbs and Curtin and they resume their journey, but they are shortly overtaken by the father of the boy he saved. The man and his companions insist that Howard return to the village so they can pay back the debt – a matter of etiquette and honor. The prospectors recognize that the indios are in earnest, and Howard relents. He relinquishes his possessions – including his share of gold – to the care of Dobbs and Curtin. They promise to rendezvous with him in Durango. Howard is welcome as a hero by the villagers upon his return.

Dobbs and Curtin, struggling to cross the high Sierra Madre, begin to quarrel in the absence of Howard's steadying influence. Dobbs, regretting having agreed to transport Howard's gear, lashes out at Curtin. Curtin maintains his composure and shoulders most of the work. Despite this, the unstable Dobbs descends into a homicidal rage, which Curtin, though anxious, is slow to grasp. When Dobbs proposes that they abscond with Howard's share, Curtin flatly vetoes the notion. Dobbs reacts to his comrade's defense of Howard as a symptom of Bolshevism. Curtin does not deny being a socialist, but emphatically refuses to betray the old man. Though not above some unscrupulousness himself, his actions are directed toward those who have power and wealth, not against his companions. When Dobbs pulls his pistol, Curtin is thunderstruck; he realizes that Dobbs is a homicidal maniac. Curtin manages to disarm Dobbs, but cannot, on principle, bring himself to kill an unarmed man. Dobbs’ hatred and contempt for Curtin deepens when he interprets this restraint as “Bolshevik” in character.

The unarmed Dobbs bides his time in the ensuing days, taunting his bewildered companion. Curtin is forced to remain awake at night to fend off an assault by Dobbs. Exhausted, he finally slips into sleep. Dobbs instantly seizes his pistol and marches Curtin into the underbrush where he shoots him point blank. Returning minutes later to make sure the man is dead, he shoots into the prostrate body a second time.

In an attempt to rationalize his crime, Dobbs recalls that, while serving in the US military in Europe, he had killed German soldiers in combat. His conscience troubles him, but he finally falls into a deep sleep. He awakes and searches for Curtin's body, but cannot find it. He begins to hallucinate as his alienation and guilt take hold of him.

He departs camp and makes good progress towards Durango, in possession of all the gold. When he spots a locomotive in the distant valley, his anxiety fades and he contemplates a trip to the British Isles, the home of his ancestors. His only concern is that his crime will be discovered before he can cash in and escape. In sight of Durango, he is reassured that the law and order that protects property in civilized areas will assert itself. Dobbs gloats over his presumed killing of Curtin and his double-dealing of Howard.

On the outskirts of Durango, Dobbs and his pack train stumble onto three Mestizo desperados – Miguel, Nacho, and Pablo – at a secluded site off the main road. Dobbs senses his life is in danger. The Mestizos begin to ransack the packs. Dobbs pulls his pistol, only to find it is unloaded. After one of the Mestizos knocks Dobbs to the ground with a rock to the head, Miguel, the leader of the gang, decapitates the stunned Dobbs with a machete. The men don his boots and pants but leave his bloody shirt behind, and escape with the pack train.

The outlaws, upon examining the contents of the pack, find only what appears to be sand in burlap bags. They guess that this is ballast placed in the packs to inflate the value by weight of commercial hides, or perhaps samples taken by a mining company engineer. They cannot fathom that it could be a fortune in placer gold. Frustrated at the paucity of loot, they slash the bags and contents pour out, swept away by the wind.

The desperados travel to a tiny village in the high Sierra Madre and offer the stolen burros for sale. The village elders casually examine the animals and the men's outfits. The brands on the burros are recognized as those sold to three prospectors months before. The village mayor is sent for; he engages the three Mestizos in an unassuming, yet probing interrogation regarding their acquisition of the burros and packs. The thieves are equivocal. The mayor quietly assembles the men of the village. After further cross-examination and more inconsistences in the scenario, a posse is sent to locate Dobbs and discover his decapitated remains. The local military garrison is notified, and a captain arrives with a platoon of troopers to take the Mestizos into custody. While being marched back to the garrison, the accused murderers are shot to death while trying to “escape”. Their corpses are buried where they fell, with a cynical display of decorum.

Curtin, wounded and barely alive, is found crawling through the underbrush by a local woodsman. He takes Curtin to his home, and Howard is notified that a gringo needs medical care. When Howard arrives, Curtin relates his ordeal with Dobbs, and swears revenge. Howard, reflecting on the incident, and without exonerating Dobbs, does not consider him a natural killer. The old timer points to the temptation of $50,000 in gold, and declares that any person might be tempted to murder for it. The two men agree to pursue Dobbs and retrieve their fortunes – not yet knowing Dobbs’ fate.

While Curtin convalesces, Howard embarks for Durango, but he is intercepted by the mayor who presided over the interrogation of Dobbs’ murderers and tells him the story. Howard is informed that the gold has been lost. He returns to his village with the pack and relates the tragic news to Curtin. Grasping the enormity of the disaster, Howard roars with Homeric laughter. Curtin is at first offended, distraught at the loss of the fortune, but finally joins the old prospector in his ironic mirth. They then take a second look through the pack and find two small bags of gold after all, and briefly consider opening a store in the port town.

Howard decides he is content to remain in the village as a medicine-man and offers Curtin to accompany him as an apprentice doctor.

Howard remains enthusiastic about a life as an honored member of the Indio community. Curtin bids Howard farewell, and promises to visit his old comrade when he fully recovers. The fate of Lacaud is never mentioned.

== Adaptations ==
=== Film ===
- John Huston successfully adapted the book as a 1948 film of the same name.
- The 1984 made-for-television movie Wet Gold has been called an unofficial remake of The Treasure of the Sierra Madre, borrowing the basic storyline but set in the modern-day Caribbean and concerning a sunken treasure of gold bars.

=== Television ===
- Episode 3 of the first season of the 1955 TV series Cheyenne gives a writing credit (novel) to B. Traven, and contains the same basic plot as the novel, with the main character, Cheyenne, standing in the role of the old prospector, Howard, of the original story.

=== Video games ===
- The first DLC for the game Fallout: New Vegas, titled Dead Money, borrows from the basic themes of the novel, with some post-apocalyptic twists, replacing the Sierra Madre mountains with the ruins of a casino known as the Sierra Madre, and having the antagonist of the DLC "solving" the novel's issue of greed by equipping the player character and all of the other NPCs in the DLC with bomb collars equipped with dead man's switches, so that if one of the group dies, they all die.
