= 1994 (Mexican TV series) =

Mexican Spanish-language docu-series on Netflix

- Genre: Documentary
- Directed by: Diego Enrique Orsono
- Country of origin: Mexico
- Original language: Spanish
- No. of seasons: 1
- No. of episodes: 5

Production
- Running time: 44-52 min.

Original release
- Network: Netflix
- Release: May 17, 2019

1994 is a Mexican Spanish-language documentary directed by Diego Enrique Orsono, that premiered on Netflix on May 17, 2019.

== Premise ==
1994 explores corruption in Mexico during the tumultuous time for politics leading up to the 1994 elections, namely the protests against NAFTA and the Zapatista uprising in Chiapas in January; the assassination of Luis Donaldo Colosio Murrieta, the governing Institutional Revolutionary Party's candidate for President of Mexico, in Tijuana in March; Colosio's replacement, Ernesto Zedillo, winning the election in August; and the economic crisis after Zedillo took office in December. The series contains new interviews and archival footage of speeches, news reports and eye-witness accounts.

== Notable interviewees ==
- Carlos Salinas de Gortari, President of Mexico (1988–1994)
- Subcomandante Galeano (formerly Marcos), Zapatista leader and spokesman
- Agustín Basave Benítez, advisor to Colosio's campaign
- Cuauhtémoc Cárdenas, PRD candidate for President in 1988, 1994, and 2000
- Luis Donaldo Colosio Riojas, Colosio's son
- Alfonso Durazo, Colosio's private secretary
- Diego Fernández de Cevallos, PAN candidate for President in 1994
- Talina Fernández, journalist
- Gael García Bernal, actor and filmmaker, involved in Chiapas protests in 1994
- Ernesto Ruffo Appel, Governor of Baja California (1989–1995)
- Raúl Salinas de Gortari, President Salinas's brother

== Episodes ==
No.	Title	Original release date
1	"El sucesor (The Successor)"	May 17, 2019
After successfully managing Salinas' presidential campaign in 1988, Colosio becomes president of the PRI, where he promises reforms. He is appointed Secretary of Social Development in Salinas' cabinet in preparation for a run for the presidency in 1994. The Salinas administration conducts trade negotiations with the United States and Canada, resulting in NAFTA.
2	"Revolución (Revolution)"	May 17, 2019
The Zapatista uprising begins in Chiapas on January 1, 1994, the day NAFTA goes into effect, and Subcomandante Marcos becomes the icon of the rebellion. The efforts of peace commissioner Manuel Camacho Solís to deal with the crisis prove popular, putting Colosio's candidacy into doubt. On March 6, Colosio delivers a public address in Mexico City acknowledging Mexico's problems and pledging to reform the system and oppose authoritarianism, revitalizing his campaign.
3	"La culebra (The Snake)"	May 17, 2019
Chaos erupts when Colosio is assassinated at a campaign rally in Tijuana on March 23, 1994. The accused shooter, Mario Aburto Martínez, is arrested, but refuses to answer questions; others are accused, arrested, and questioned as being conspirators. At the insistence of Colosio's ailing widow, the Salinas administration appoints a special prosecutor.
4	"Caballero Águila (Eagle Knight)"	May 17, 2019
Colosio's campaign manager, Ernesto Zedillo, becomes the PRI's new candidate, and wins the election in August. Aburto goes on trial and confesses to shooting Colosio, and is sentenced to 40 years in prison. Multiple special prosecutors investigate both Colosio's murder and the murder of PRI secretary-general José Francisco Ruiz Massieu in September; several accused conspirators are imprisoned and then released due to lack of evidence.
5	"Tierra redonda (Round Earth)"	May 17, 2019
Zedillo assumes the presidency on December 1, 1994, and is confronted with a devastating economic crisis. Marcos is "unmasked" as Rafael Sebastián Guillén in a failed effort to damage the Zapatistas' image. The special prosecutions continue for the murders of Colosio and Ruiz Massieu. Raúl Salinas is arrested and charged with Ruiz Massieu's murder, but is exonerated after spending ten years in prison. Zedillo's administration ends in a democratic transition to Vicente Fox of the opposition PAN in 2000.

== See also ==
- Crime Diaries: The Candidate, Netflix crime drama series covering the same events
