= Magdalena de Kino Airport =

Airport in Sonora, Mexico

Tasicuri Airport Aeródromo Rodolfo Soto Bartell
- IATA: none; ICAO: MM69; LID: TSI

Summary
- Airport type: Public
- Operator: H. Ayuntamiento Constitucional de Magdalena
- Serves: El Tasícuri; Magdalena de Kino
- Location: Magdalena Municipality
- Elevation AMSL: 2,523 ft / 769 m
- Coordinates: 30°40′25″N 110°55′56″W

Map
- Location of the airport in Sonora TSI (Mexico)

Runways
Direction	Length		Surface
Direction	ft	m	Surface
03/21	4,725	1,440	Asphalt
- AFAC

Rodolfo Soto Bartell Airport (ICAO Code: MM69 - DGAC Code: TSI), also known as Tasícuri Airfield, Magdalena de Kino Airfield, or Tacicuri Airport (as used in Microsoft Flight Simulator 2004), is a small airfield located northwest of the town of El Tasícuri in the municipality of Magdalena, Sonora, and is operated by the Magdalena municipality. The aerodrome is named in honor of Rodolfo Soto Bartell, a pioneer of aviation in northern Sonora, who was a private pilot and transported ranchers to various locations in Sonora in his airplane. It has a 1,440-meter-long and 15-meter-wide runway with a turnaround at runway 03, a 50m x 30m (1,500 square meter) apron, and hangars. In 2017, the rehabilitation of the airfield was carried out by placing asphalt micro-surfacing on the runway and paving the access road to the airfield from the highway, all with resources from the Government of the State of Sonora. Also in 2018, the procedures were carried out through the DGAC to obtain the operating permits for the airfield.
