= Luis Colosio Fernández =

Mexican politician

Senator of the Congress of the Union for Sonora
- In office 1 September 2000 – 31 August 2006

Personal details
- Born: 2 March 1923 Magdalena de Kino, Sonora, Mexico
- Died: 6 February 2010 (aged 86) Hermosillo, Sonora, Mexico
- Party: PRI
- Spouse: Ofelia Murrieta Armida García
- Children: Luis Donaldo Colosio Murrieta
- Relatives: Luis Donaldo Colosio Riojas (grandson)
- Occupation: Politician

Luis Colosio Fernández (2 March 1923 – 6 February 2010) was a Mexican politician affiliated with the Institutional Revolutionary Party (PRI). He served as Senator of the LVIII and LIX Legislatures of the Mexican Congress representing Sonora, as well as the municipal president of Magdalena de Kino.

He was father of Luis Donaldo Colosio, presidential candidate of the PRI in the 1994 election who was murdered on 23 March 1994.
