= Crime Diaries: The Candidate =

Mexican Spanish-language crime TV mini-series

- Genre: Crime; drama; thriller
- Starring: Martín Altomaro; Norma Angélica; Enrique Arreola
- Country of origin: Mexico
- Original language: Spanish
- No. of seasons: 1
- No. of episodes: 8

Original release
- Network: Netflix
- Release: March 22, 2019

Crime Diaries: The Candidate (Spanish: Historia de un Crimen: Colosio) is a Spanish-language Mexican biographical crime television miniseries starring Martín Altomaro, Norma Angélica and Enrique Arreola. The plot is inspired by real-life events with real-life footage inter-cutting with the drama, and revolves around the assassination in Tijuana of presidential candidate Luis Donaldo Colosio from Mexico's ruling PRI party in 1994. The series follows a pair of detectives and Luis's dying widow Diana Laura (Ilse Salas) as they investigate to unravel the truth.

It was ordered direct-to-series, and premiered on Netflix on March 22, 2019.

== Cast ==
- Martín Altomaro as Raúl Salinas de Gortari
- Norma Angélica as Maria Luisa Martínez
- Enrique Arreola as Manuel Camacho Solís
- Ari Brickman as Carlos Salinas de Gortari
- Alejandro Cuétara as Jorge Mancillas
- Hernan Del Riego as Ernesto Zedillo Ponce de León
- Alberto Guerra as Comandante Federico Benítez
- Jorge Antonio Guerrero as Mario Aburto
- Daniel Haddad as Agente Solis
- Jorge A. Jiménez as Luis Donaldo Colosio Murrieta
- Orlando Moguel as Octavio
- Lisa Owen as Madre Superiora
- Ilse Salas as Diana Laura Riojas de Colosio
- Gustavo Sánchez Parra as Comandante David Rubí Sánchez
- Marco Treviño as Miguel Montes
- Evaristo Valverde as Vicente Mayoral
- Carolina Molva as Monja Joven
- Everardo Arzate as Liebano Saénz

== Episodes ==
No.	Title	Directed by	Written by	Original release date
1	"The Candidate"	Hiromi Kamata	Alejandro Gerber Bicecci, Itzel Lara & Rodrigo Santos	March 22, 2019
Encouraged by his wife, Mexican presidential candidate Luis Donaldo Colosio resists political party pressure and writes a speech that sticks to his principles.
2	"Who did it?"	Hiromi Kamata	Alejandro Gerber Bicecci	March 22, 2019
Three suspects are arrested in Tijuana for the murder of Luis Donaldo Colosio. Police Chief Benitez becomes even more suspicious when the investigation gets immediately taken out of his hands by orders from "above."
3	"The Prosecutor"	Hiromi Kamata	Andrés Burgos & Rodrigo Santos	March 22, 2019
At Colosio's funeral, Diana Laura sees suspects at every turn. Noticing Mario Aburto's resemblance to a new murder victim, Benitez formulates a new theory.
4	"Lost Bullet"	Hiromi Kamata	Itzel Lara	March 22, 2019
A confession from her driver spurs Diana Laura to visit General Garces. Miguel Montes formulates his own theory about the murder. Benitez receives a key piece of evidence.
5	"The Watch"	Natalia Beristáin	Alejandro Gerber Bicecci	March 22, 2019
Montes interrogates the Tucanes. A new detail is spotted in the assassination video by Mario Aburto's brother. Salinas announces a political appointment that makes Diana Laura suspicious of the party.
6	"I killed him"	Natalia Beristáin	Itzel Lara	March 22, 2019
In light of new evidence gathered by Benitez which points to two shooters, Montes strengthens his theory of a lone gunman. Diana Laura confronts Montes and begs him for an impossible favor.
7	"Welcome to Lomas Taurinas"	Natalia Beristáin	Alejandro Gerber Bicecci	March 22, 2019
Another party member is killed. Diana Laura encounters complications on a secret trip to Tijuana to visit Aburto's family. Benitez is sent a warning.
8	"Forgive and Forget"	Natalia Beristáin	Itzel Lara	March 22, 2019
Montes receives a new piece of evidence that forces him to make a decision about the case. Rubi confronts Lopez Riestra. Diana Laura has parting words for Montes.

== Release ==
Crime Diaries: The Candidate was released on Netflix on March 22, 2019.

== See also ==
- 1994, Netflix documentary covering same events
