= Luis Donaldo Colosio Murrieta =

Mexican politician, economist, and presidential candidate (1950–1994)

- Luis Donaldo Colosio Murrieta in 1994

Secretary of Social Development of Mexico
- In office 8 April 1992 – 28 November 1993
- President: Carlos Salinas de Gortari
- Preceded by: Patricio Chirinos Calero
- Succeeded by: Carlos Rojas Gutiérrez

President of the Institutional Revolutionary Party
- In office 3 September 1988 – 13 April 1992
- Preceded by: Jorge de la Vega Domínguez
- Succeeded by: Rafael Rodríguez Barrera

Senator of the Congress of the Union for Sonora
- In office 1 September 1988 – 2 December 1988
- Preceded by: Fernando Mendoza Contreras
- Succeeded by: Armando Hopkins Durazo

Member of the Congress of the Union for the 1st district of Sonora
- In office 1 September 1985 – 31 August 1988
- Preceded by: Rubén Castro Ojeda
- Succeeded by: Sergio Jesús Torres Serrano

Personal details
- Born: 10 February 1950 Magdalena de Kino, Sonora, Mexico
- Died: 23 March 1994 (aged 44) Tijuana, Baja California, Mexico
- Cause of death: Assassination by gunshot
- Resting place: Municipal Cemetery; Magdalena de Kino, Sonora, Mexico
- Party: PRI
- Spouse: Diana Laura Riojas (m. 1982)
- Children: Luis Donaldo Colosio Riojas; Mariana Colosio
- Parent(s): Luis Colosio Fernández; Armida Ofelia Murrieta García
- Education: Monterrey Institute of Technology and Higher Education (BA); University of Pennsylvania (MA)
- Occupation: Politician, economist

Luis Donaldo Colosio Murrieta (Spanish pronunciation: [ˈlwis doˈnal.do koˈlo.sjo muˈrje.ta]; 10 February 1950 – 23 March 1994) was a Mexican politician, economist, and Institutional Revolutionary Party (PRI) presidential candidate, who was assassinated at a campaign rally in Tijuana during the presidential campaign of 1994.

== Early life ==
Colosio was the son of Luis Colosio Fernández and Armida Ofelia Murrieta García. Born into a family with a long political heritage in Magdalena de Kino, Sonora, Colosio's family was of Italian and Spanish descent.

== Political history ==
Colosio Murrieta studied economics at the Instituto Tecnológico y de Estudios Superiores de Monterrey, after which he joined the Institutional Revolutionary Party (PRI) in 1972. Shortly thereafter, he began postgraduate studies at the University of Pennsylvania and research at the International Institute for Applied Systems Analysis in Austria before returning to Mexico. In 1979, he joined the Secretariat of Budget and Planning under future president Carlos Salinas de Gortari.

In the 1985 mid-terms he was elected to Congress as the federal deputy for Sonora's 1st district, which included his home town, and, in 1987, he was selected to serve on the PRI's National Executive Committee. In 1988, Salinas chose him as the campaign manager for his presidential campaign. In the same election, Colosio was elected to the Senate, representing Sonora.

In the early years of Salinas's presidency, Colosio served as the chairman of their party's National Executive Committee. In 1992, Salinas chose him to serve in his cabinet, in the newly created position of Social Development Secretary.

== Campaign for president ==
After a slow start, with the spotlight focusing on former foreign secretary Manuel Camacho's negotiations with the EZLN guerrillas, Colosio appeared to get the traditional support of the political machine of the PRI. Like all the PRI's previous presidential candidates, he was greeted by large crowds throughout his presidential campaign, although the PRI's waning popularity meant some reduction in initial enthusiasm.

=== Speech on 6 March 1994 ===
On 6 March 1994, the anniversary of the Institutional Revolutionary Party (the PRI), Colosio delivered a controversial but popular speech in the nation's capital, in front of the Monument to the Mexican Revolution. In it, he spoke of indigenous communities, government abuse, and the people's independence from government, all hot button issues at a time when the Zapatistas were making similar statements. The speech is widely considered the moment when Colosio broke with President Salinas.

=== Camacho vs Colosio ===
Since Mexico's constitution permits presidents to remain in power for only one term, and as an extralegal rule presidents (until Salinas) handpicked their own successors (the party's first primary election in history took place in 1999), Colosio apparently continued to enjoy the president's favour, expressed in his famous declaration No se hagan bolas: el candidato es Colosio ("Don't get confused: Colosio is the candidate" would be an appropriate translation, literally it means "Don't get tied up in knots: Colosio is the candidate").

Salinas's declaration was motivated by persistent rumors that highly visible Camacho would replace Colosio, who was not doing well in his campaign. Camacho let speculation grow for some time, but eventually declared he would not run for office, concentrating his attention on the Chiapas rebellion instead. The day after Camacho's statement, Colosio was killed.

== Assassination ==
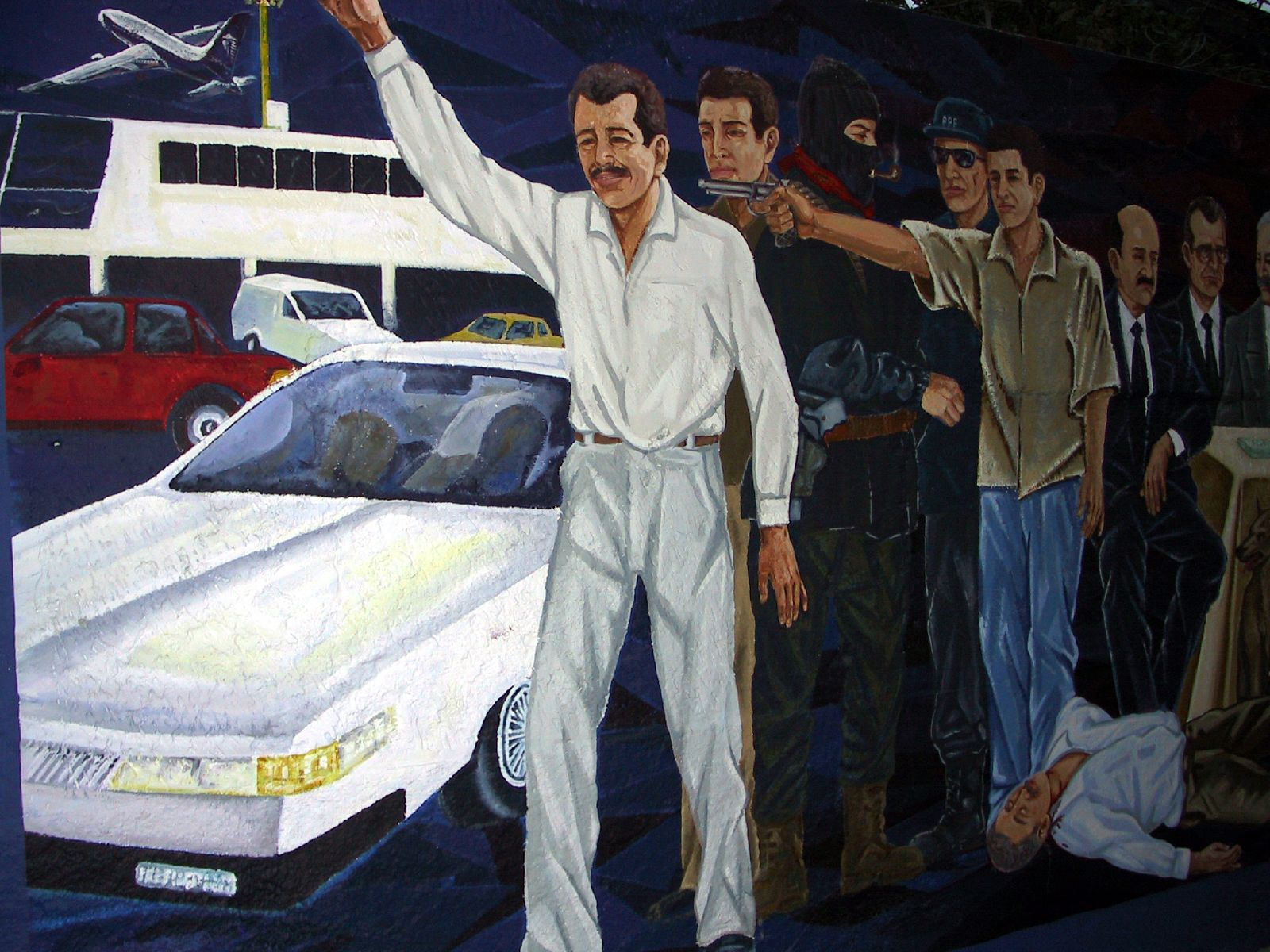
Mural depicting the murder

At 5:05 pm PST, on 23 March 1994, at a campaign rally in Lomas Taurinas, a poor neighborhood of Tijuana, Baja California, Colosio was shot in the head with a .38 Special that was originally purchased in San Francisco. Colosio collapsed, and was subsequently rushed to the city's main hospital, after plans to fly him to an American hospital across the border were canceled. His death was announced a few hours later, amid contradicting eyewitness reports that remain to this day.

=== Perpetrator ===
The shooter, Mario Aburto Martínez, was arrested at the site and never wavered from his story that he had acted alone. Nonetheless, many theories still surround Colosio's assassination. The authorities were criticized for their poor handling of Aburto, having shaved, bathed and given him a prison haircut before showing him to the media, which started rumors about whether that man, who looked so different from the one arrested, was really the murderer. Colosio received three bullet wounds, and it was never clear if they could have been fired by a single person or not. The case was officially closed after many different prosecutors investigated it, but after the many mishandlings of the investigation and contradictory versions, the controversy continues. Aburto remains imprisoned at the high-security La Palma facility in Almoloya de Juárez.

=== Conspiracy theories ===
There are a number of conspiracy theories about the assassination, including that it was by narcotraffickers. However, the most accepted theory among the Mexican people is that he was betrayed by his own party and that the murder was orchestrated by high members of the PRI including President Salinas, as Colosio's speech was moving away from Salinas's political agenda to maintain influence during further Mexican administrations. Shortly after Colosio was assassinated, Salinas abruptly ended a meeting with Canadian prime minister Jean Chrétien, publicly referring to the slaying as an "act of infamy".

On 18 November 1994, Diana Laura Riojas, the wife of Colosio, died while investigating the murder of her husband; officially she died from pancreatic cancer. The newly elected president Ernesto Zedillo did not attend her funeral.

== Aftermath ==
With only four months before the election, the PRI found itself hamstrung by the constitutional requirement that no presidential candidate can hold public office during the six months immediately prior to the election; this effectively disqualified the entire cabinet, where most of the more promising replacements were. Of the few potential candidates available, Salinas eventually chose Zedillo, who had just resigned as secretary of education to serve as Colosio's campaign manager, because Manlio Fabio Beltrones, a very close collaborator of the murdered candidate, showed a video where Colosio praised Zedillo. This stroke of luck for Zedillo, who would have never been a candidate under normal circumstances, gave rise to even more rumours – unfounded or not.

A few months later, Salinas's brother-in-law, José Francisco Ruiz Massieu, president of the PRI, was also murdered in plain daylight in Mexico City, eliminating the PRI's two most visible and powerful official leaders, Colosio and Ruiz Massieu. Eventually Ernesto Zedillo was elected president.

Eight months after Colosio's assassination, his wife, Laura Riojas, died of cancer. News magazine Proceso reported Colosio's widow's first words upon learning of her husband's assassination: "Who did it?" Two children, later cared for by relatives, survived. Colosio's father continued determined to uncover what he strongly suspected are hidden truths behind his son's very public murder and, in 2004, he published a book about the case. He died in 2010.

On a visit to Lomas Taurinas on 11 February 2021, Luis Donaldo Colosio Riojas said he forgave "the cowards" who had killed his father. He also criticized the political class that kidnaps the power to serve their evil groups and interests and he condemned the fact that calls for unity and solidarity from the leaders are not heard.

== Colosio in popular culture ==
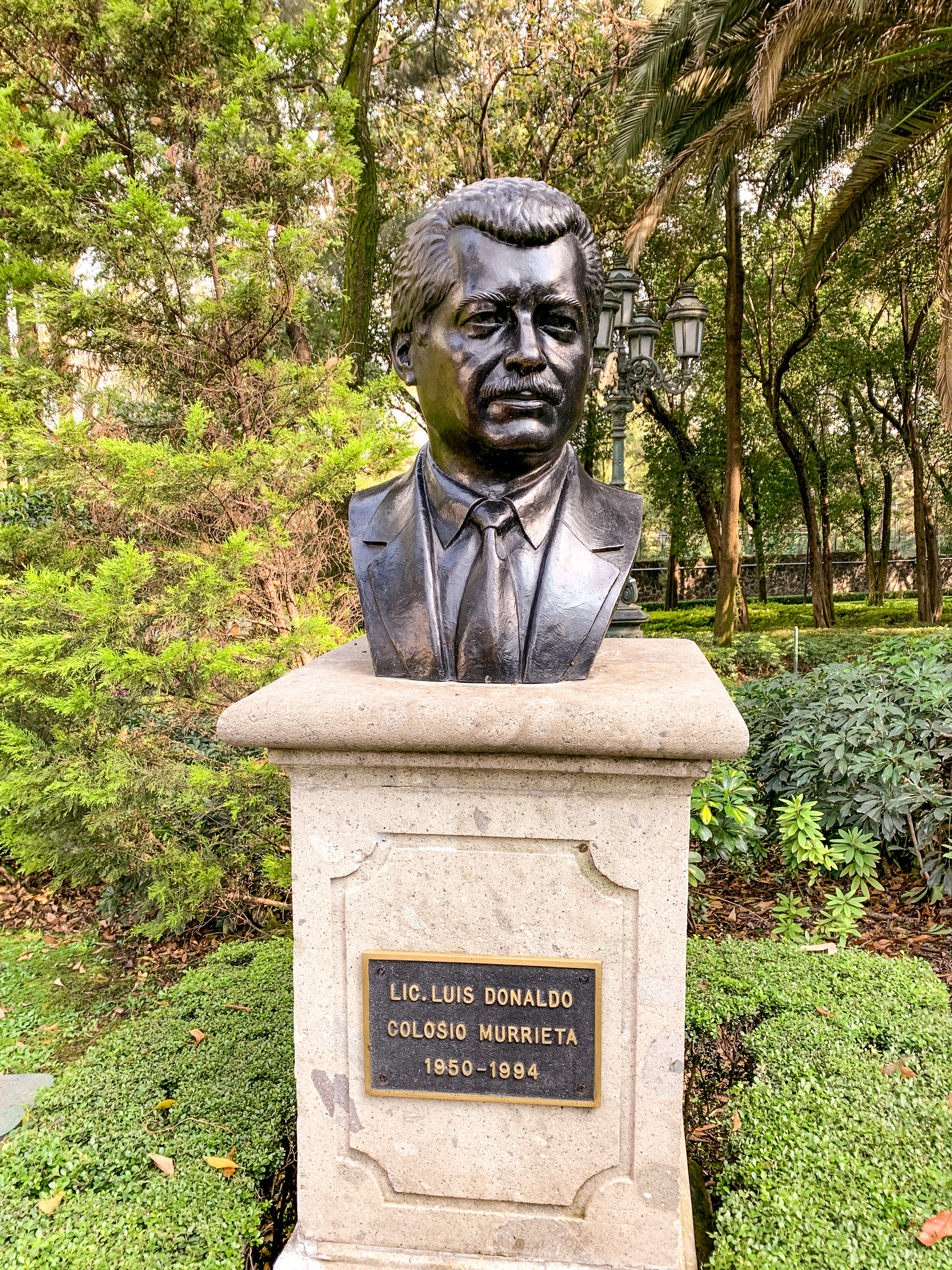
Bust of Colosio at Los Pinos

Colosio: El asesinato (2012), directed by Carlos Bolado, explored the aftermath of the assassination of the candidate and various conspiracy theories. It notes that two investigations were conducted, and details the 15 associated people who were killed following the investigation, as well as widespread violence and unrest.

Mexican rock group El Tri wrote a song about the assassination of Colosio called "Con la cola entre las patas" (With the tail between the legs).

Two Netflix series released in 2019 cover the events leading up to and following Colosio's assassination: The documentary 1994, and the biographical crime drama Crime Diaries: The Candidate.

Party political offices
Preceded by Carlos Salinas	PRI presidential candidate 1994 (assassinated)	Succeeded by Ernesto Zedillo
