= List of sister cities in Arizona =

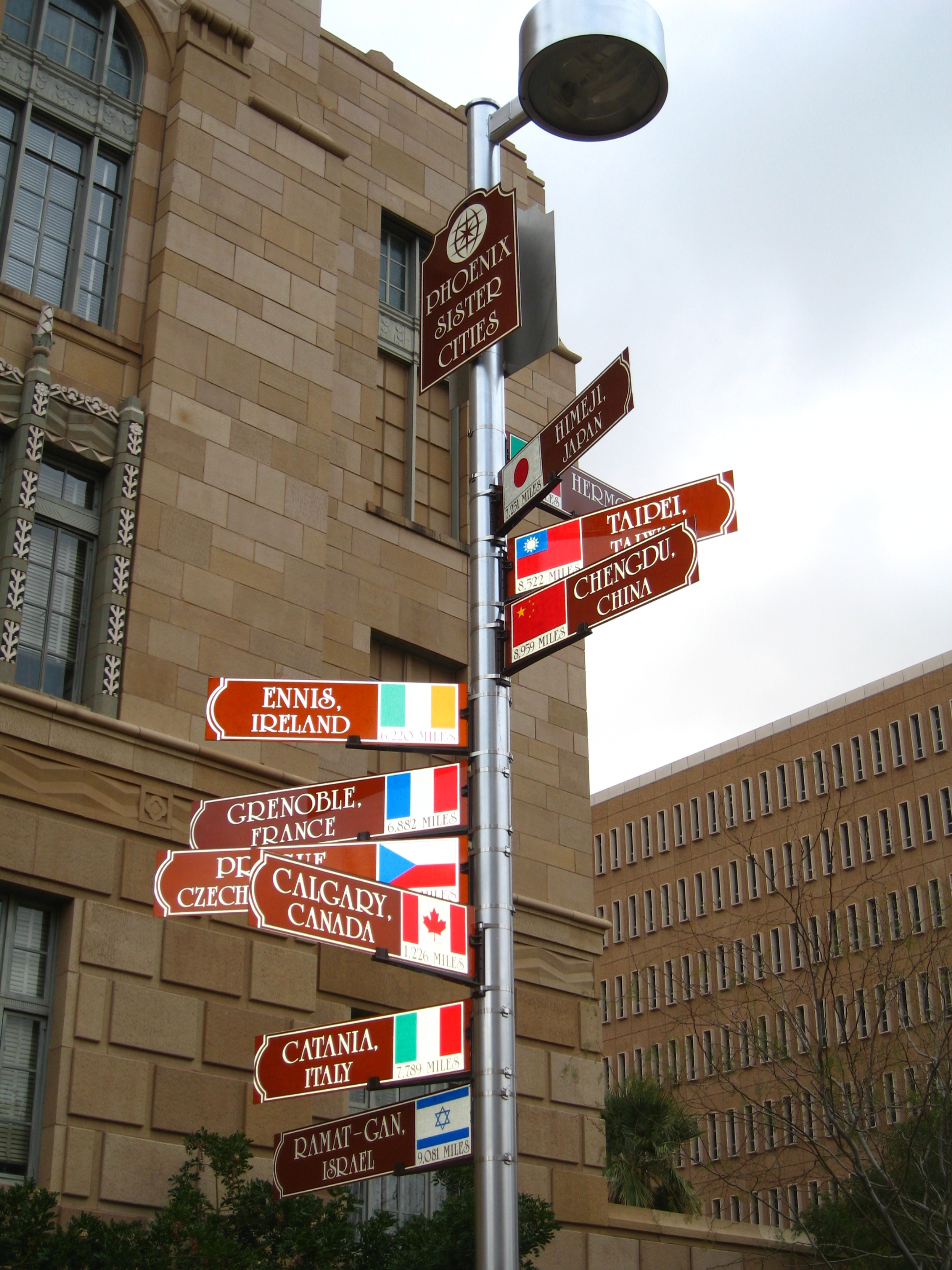
Signs denoting sister cities in Phoenix, 2008

This is a list of sister cities in the United States state of Arizona. Sister cities, known in Europe as town twins, are cities which partner with each other to promote human contact and cultural links, although this partnering is not limited to cities and often includes counties, regions, states and other sub-national entities.

Many Arizona jurisdictions work with foreign cities through Sister Cities International, an organization whose goal is to "promote peace through mutual respect, understanding, and cooperation."

== C ==
Chandler

- (Republic of Ireland) Tullamore, Ireland

== F ==
Flagstaff

- Blue Mountains, Australia
- Manzanillo, Mexico
- Navojoa, Mexico

Fountain Hills

- Concepción de Ataco, El Salvador
- Dierdorf, Germany
- Zamość, Poland

== G ==
Gilbert

- Antrim and Newtownabbey, Northern Ireland, United Kingdom
- Leshan, China

Glendale

- Memmingen, Germany
- Ørland, Norway

== M ==
Mesa

- Burnaby, Canada
- Caraz, Peru
- Guaymas, Mexico
- Kaiping, China
- Upper Hutt, New Zealand

== P ==
Peoria

- Ards and North Down, Northern Ireland, United Kingdom

Phoenix

- Calgary, Canada
- Catania, Italy
- Chengdu, China
- (Republic of Ireland) Ennis, Ireland
- Grenoble, France
- Hermosillo, Mexico
- Himeji, Japan
- Prague, Czech Republic
- Ramat Gan, Israel
- Suwon, South Korea
- Taipei, Taiwan

Pima County

- Kaohsiung, Taiwan

Pinetop-Lakeside

- Spišské Podhradie, Slovakia

Prescott

- Caborca, Mexico
- Suchitoto, El Salvador
- Zeitz, Germany

== S ==
Sahuarita

- Magdalena de Kino, Mexico

San Luis

- San Luis Río Colorado, Mexico

Scottsdale

- Álamos, Mexico
- Cairns, Australia
- Haikou, China
- Interlaken, Switzerland
- (Republic of Ireland) Killarney, Ireland
- Kingston, Canada
- Marrakesh, Morocco
- Uasin Gishu, Kenya

Sedona

- Canmore, Canada

Show Low

- Spišské Podhradie, Slovakia

Sierra Vista

- Cananea, Mexico
- Radebeul, Germany

== T ==
Tempe

- Agra, India
- Beaulieu-sur-Mer, France
- (Republic of Ireland) Carlow, Ireland
- Cuenca, Ecuador
- Cusco, Peru
- Hutt, New Zealand
- Regensburg, Germany
- Skopje, North Macedonia
- Timbuktu, Mali
- Trollhättan, Sweden
- Zhenjiang, China

Tucson

- Ciudad Obregón, Mexico
- Guadalajara, Mexico
- Kaohsiung, Taiwan
- Mazatlán, Mexico
- Pécs, Hungary
- Puerto Peñasco, Mexico

== Y ==
Yuma

- Frankfurt an der Oder, Germany
