= Juan Treviño =

Juan Treviño may refer to:

- Juan Daniel García Treviño (born 2000), Mexican singer, actor and dancer
- Juan Francisco Treviño (fl. 1670s), Governor of New Mexico
- Juan Treviño de Guillamas (died before 1636), Spanish governor of Florida and Venezuela

== See also ==
- Treviño (surname)
