= Treviño (disambiguation) =

Treviño is a municipality in Spain.

Treviño or Trevino may also refer to:

== People ==
Last name

- Treviño (surname), people with this surname
- Nicolas Treviño, fictional character on the soap opera Dallas

First name

- Trevino Betty (born 1971), Canadian sprinter
- Trevino Brings Plenty, Lakota Sioux poet and musician
- Trevino Forbes, Namibian politician

== Places ==
Spain

- Busto de Treviño, a hamlet in the municipality of Condado de Treviño, in Burgos province, Castile and León
- Condado de Treviño, a municipality in Burgos province, Castile and León
- Treviño enclave, an enclave of the Basque Country in northern Spain
- Villamayor de Treviño, a municipality in Burgos province, Castile and León

Elsewhere

- General Treviño, a municipality in northern Mexico
- Trevino, Wisconsin, an unincorporated community in the United States

== Other ==
- Jacinto Treviño College, a defunct college in Mercedes, Texas
- Rick Trevino (album), a 1994 album by the singer of the same name
- Trevino–Uribe Rancho, a historic fortified home in San Ygnacio, Texas
- Vidal M. Trevino School of Communications and Fine Arts, a high school in Laredo, Texas

== See also ==
- Travino, a village in Russia
- Trebino, a village in North Macedonia
