= Álvaro Pérez Treviño =

Mexican politician

Álvaro Pérez Treviño (Note: In this Mexican name, the surname is Pérez and the second or maternal family name is Treviño.) (8 May 1930 – 26 April 2016) was a Mexican politician. He was a founding member of the defunct Authentic Party of the Mexican Revolution (PARM), of which he was the presidential candidate in 1994 election, in which he obtained 0.55% of the votes. He also served as the municipal president of Guerrero, Coahuila, in 1955–1957.

He died on 26 April 2016 at the age of 85.

He was the first-born of General Manuel Pérez Treviño.
