= Luis Donaldo Colosio Riojas =

Mexican politician

Senator of the Republic
- Incumbent
- Assumed office 1 September 2024
- Preceded by: Víctor Oswaldo Fuentes Solís
- Constituency: Nuevo León

Municipal president of Monterrey
- In office 4 June 2024 – 22 August 2024
- Preceded by: Betsabé Rocha Nieto (interim)
- Succeeded by: Francisco Donaciano Bahena Sampogna (acting)
- In office 29 September 2021 – 29 February 2024
- Preceded by: Adrián de la Garza
- Succeeded by: Betsabé Rocha Nieto (interim)

Member of the Congress of Nuevo León
- In office 1 September 2018 – 1 February 2021
- Preceded by: José Arturo Salinas Garza
- Succeeded by: Marco Antonio Decanini Contreras
- Constituency: 4th district

Personal details
- Born: 31 July 1985 (age 41) Magdalena de Kino, Sonora, Mexico
- Party: Citizens' Movement
- Spouse: María de la Luz García Luna (m. 2009)
- Children: 2
- Parent(s): Luis Donaldo Colosio Murrieta; Diana Laura Riojas
- Relatives: Luis Colosio Fernández (paternal grandfather)
- Education: Monterrey Institute of Technology and Higher Education (LLB)
- Occupation: Politician; Lawyer
- Website: https://www.colosioriojas.mx/

Luis Donaldo Colosio Riojas (born 31 July 1985) is a Mexican lawyer and politician who serves as a senator from Nuevo León. A member of Citizens' Movement, he previously served as a deputy in the Congress of Nuevo León from 2018 to 2021 and as mayor of Monterrey from 2021 to 2024. He is the son of Luis Donaldo Colosio Murrieta, a presidential candidate who was assassinated at a campaign rally in Tijuana in 1994.

== Early life and education ==
Colosio was born on 31 July 1985 in Magdalena de Kino, Sonora, to Luis Donaldo Colosio Murrieta and Diana Laura Riojas. His father and grandfather were both politicians affiliated with the Institutional Revolutionary Party (PRI), with his father being the PRI's presidential candidate for the 1994 election. His mother was an economist. Colosio has a younger sister named Mariana.

When Colosio was eight years old, he and his sister became orphans after their father was assassinated at a campaign rally in Tijuana in 1994, followed by their mother's death from pancreatic cancer eight months later. The siblings were then adopted by their maternal aunt and uncle, Hilda Elisa Riojas and Fernando Cantú, and moved to Monterrey, Nuevo León.

=== Education ===
Colosio attended the Mexico City campus of the Monterrey Institute of Technology and Higher Education, where he earned a Bachelor of Laws in 2010. He is currently pursuing a master's degree in corporate law from the University of Monterrey.

== Early political career ==
Colosio was initially discouraged by his family from pursuing a political career. In 2006, he received an offer to be a candidate for plurinominal deputy, which he rejected.

After obtaining his law degree in 2010, Colosio co-founded the law firm Basave Colosio Sánchez, alongside Agustín Basave Alanís, Alejandro Basave, and Manuel Sánchez O’Sullivan. The firm specialized in parliamentary consultancy, advising various public officials and political figures. During this period, Colosio established relationships with leaders of the Citizens' Movement (MC), who would later encourage him to seek elected office.

In 2017, Colosio formally accepted an invitation from MC to run as a candidate in the 2018 elections. In January 2018, Samuel García, the party's coordinator in Nuevo León, publicly introduced Colosio as a prospective candidate for a popularly elected position at either the state or federal level.

=== Local deputy ===
Colosio was nominated by Citizens' Movement as a candidate for the 4th district of Nuevo León in the 2018 state election. He won the seat with 33.41 percent of the vote, defeating the incumbent, Arturo Salinas Garza of the National Action Party (PAN), by a margin of 6.78 points, flipping the district. He was the only candidate from Citizens' Movement to secure a seat through first-past-the-post voting in the election.

On 1 September 2018, he was sworn in as a member of the LXXV Legislature of the Congress of Nuevo León.

== Municipal president of Monterrey (2021–2024) ==
=== Election ===
On 15 November 2020, Citizens' Movement announced that Senator Samuel García and Colosio were seeking the party's gubernatorial nomination. García was selected as the gubernatorial nominee, and on 25 January 2021, Colosio registered as a precandidate for municipal president of Monterrey instead. He won the election with over 47% of the vote in an eight-way race, beating his nearest opponent by over 16 points.

=== Tenure ===
Colosio was inaugurated on 29 September 2021 at 11:55 p.m.

During his first year, Colosio enjoyed an approval rating of 54.4%, according to ¿Cómo Vamos Nuevo León?. However, his approval rating dropped by 23 points in 2023, largely due to the slow pace of construction projects and a perceived rise in crime, becoming the lowest-rated mayor in the Monterrey metropolitan area.

On 16 February 2024, Colosio took a leave of absence to pursue one of Nuevo León's Senate seats in the 2024 elections. He temporarily handed over his duties to Betsabé Rocha Nieto on 29 February, secured a Senate seat, resumed his role as mayor on 4 June, and stepped down as mayor on 22 August, with Francisco Donaciano Bahena Sampogna taking his place as acting mayor.

==== Urban design and parks ====
Colosio launched the Corredores Verdes (in English: Green corridors) initiative to make Monterrey more walkable by expanding sidewalks, improving crosswalks, adding bike lanes, and planting trees along key downtown avenues. However, the initiative faced criticism for causing traffic disruptions due to lane closures and delays in construction. Drivers also voiced frustration over reduced lanes and parking along the reconfigured avenues.

Infrastructure improvements and maintenance were carried out on several Monterrey landmarks, including the Mirador del Obispado, the Faro del Comercio, and the Barrio Antiguo. A roundabout was constructed around the city's Independence Arch to protect it from vehicles.

To address the lack of green spaces in Monterrey, Colosio rehabilitated numerous neighborhood parks across the city. Larger parks, including Parque Lago and Parque Alameda, were also reforested and rehabilitated as part of these efforts. Fundidora Park and Parque España were connected with the Puente Verde (in English: Green Bridge), a pedestrian bridge spanning the Santa Catarina River.

==== Roads ====
Between 2022 and 2023, the Monterrey government repaved about 729 thousand cubic meters of pavement throughout the municipality, covering eight of the city's major avenues and streets in 46 different neighborhoods.

==== Crime and policing ====
Colosio introduced the security strategy named Monterrey Protege (in English: Monterrey Protects), which expanded police coverage from 177 to 343 neighborhoods, installed 6,000 security cameras, placed panic buttons throughout the city, and added 444 patrol cars to the police force. Colosio also increased police salaries by 15% at the beginning of his term and implemented an additional 20% raise in February 2024.

Despite his efforts, the homicide rate in Monterrey has remained relatively unchanged during Colosio's tenure, only decreasing from 226 to 223 annual deaths between 2021 and 2023. However, there has been a decrease in the perception of insecurity, with 69.8% feeling unsafe in December 2022 and only 58.6% feeling unsafe in December 2023, the lowest since 2016. Confidence in the police has also increased from 64.9% to 68.2% between 2022 and 2023.

== Senate of the Republic (2024–present) ==
=== Election ===
In the 2024 Mexican Senate election, Colosio and Martha Herrera González were nominated by Citizens' Movement to represent Nuevo León in the Senate, with Colosio leading the party's two-name formula. In a close three-way race, Colosio and Herrera garnered 32.13% of the vote, placing second to Sigamos Haciendo Historia's formula, which garnered 33.95%, and ahead of Fuerza y Corazón por México's, which received 31.51%. As the first in his party's formula, Colosio won a seat through first minority.

=== Tenure ===
Upon being sworn in, Colosio was chosen as one of four secretaries in the Senate's Board of Directors for the first session of the LXVI Legislature.
