= Socialist Party of Mexico =

Political party in Mexico

Socialist Party of Mexico Partido Socialista de México
- Abbreviation: PSM
- Leader: Rafael Aguilar Talamantes
- Founded: 2001
- Dissolved: 2013
- Merger of: PRD
- Preceded by: PFCRN
- Ideology: Socialism
- Political position: Left-wing

The Socialist Party of Mexico (Spanish: Partido Socialista de México) also known as PSM, is a defunct socialist political party in Mexico, founded in 2001. led by Rafael Aguilar Talamantes.

The PSM was formed by former members of the Cardenist Front of National Reconstruction and the Party of the Democratic Revolution.

== History ==
The party contested the 2001 municipal election in Tlaxcala, obtaining 328 votes. In the municipality of San Pablo del Monte it obtained 160 votes (0.8%). In the 2002 elections to municipal presidents in Guerrero, it obtained 2118 votes. In the elections to local deputies, it obtained 2449 votes.

In 2004 the Aguilar declared that the party had become active on the national level.
