= Workers' Socialist Party (Mexico) =

Defunct political party

Workers' Socialist Party Partido Socialista de los Trabajadores
- Founded: 1 May 1975
- Dissolved: 1987
- Split from: Comité Nacional de Auscultación y Organización
- Succeeded by: Party of the Cardenist Front of National Reconstruction
- Headquarters: Mexico City, Mexico
- Newspaper: El Insurgente
- Ideology: Socialism; Marxism–Leninism; Reformism; Anti-imperialism
- Political position: Left-wing to far-left

The Workers' Socialist Party (Spanish: Partido Socialista de los Trabajadores, PST) was a socialist political party in Mexico. The PST was founded in 1975 by Rafael Aguilar Talamantes, Graco Ramírez and Juan Ignacio del Valle, though the party did not obtain its official registration until 1979. The party nominated Cándido Díaz Cerecedo in the 1982 presidential election.

The PST won 10 plurinominal seats in the Chamber of Deputies in their first elections in 1979. Three years later, they gained one seat. Finally, the PST gained one additional seat in the 1985 midterm elections.

However, the PST became a satellite party of the ruling Institutional Revolutionary Party (PRI). The PST was renamed the Party of the Cardenist Front of National Reconstruction in 1987.

== History ==
Many of the party's early leaders participated in the 1968 student protests.

=== Initial stages (1973–1975) ===
The PST traced its origins to a faction of the Comité Nacional de Auscultación y Organización (CNOA), led by Rafael Aguilar Talamantes, who believed that the group was too slow in their efforts to organize a political party. They split from the CNAO and wrote "Las causas de la separación" (Causes of the separation), which was published in Excélsior on 6 March 1973. Their first act was to organize the Reunión de Intercambio y Consulta on 24 and 25 March with the aim of uniting the struggles of the working class; the event drew 187 attendees from 14 states. Among them were railway worker unionists, professors, tobacco farmers, journalists and members of the Movimiento de Acción y Unidad Socialista (MAUS).

The attendees agreed almost unanimously on the necessity for a new type of Marxist–Leninist party to serve the interests of the exploited working class, and took on the task of recruiting former revolutionaries and socialist sympathizers from around the country. An "organizing and consulting committee" (COC) was formed, with representation from each of the 14 states.

By the time the group met again in July, there were 1,756 affiliates, over 550 of whom attended the meeting. They published two manifestos in September 1973 and November 1974, respectively. Additionally, the COC began using El Insurgente as its official newspaper. Throughout the rest of the year and into early 1975, the group was active in the fieldworkers' and peasants' movements and continued distributing copies of El Insurgente in promotion of their organization.

=== Official foundation and registration (1975–1978) ===
The constituent national assembly of the Workers' Socialist Party (Partido Socialista de los Trabajadores) first convened on 1 May 1975. They ratified the party's statutes, declaration of principles, and plan of action, and elected the 64 members of the central committee. The PST continued its political activism as well. In an example, a group of 150 fieldworkers and PST members in Chilpancingo, Guerrero, marched to the government palace in an attempt to talk to the Governor of Guerrero, Rubén Figueroa Figueroa. The incident was monitored and documented by the Mexican secret police, the Dirección Federal de Seguridad.

Like most independent left-wing parties that formed during the 1970s student movement, the PST was not able to obtain legal registry under the strict electoral laws of the time. However, in 1977, a series of electoral reforms were introduced by the Institutional Revolutionary Party (PRI) regime to give more opportunities to opposition parties. The reforms included expanding the Chamber of Deputies to 400 members and increasing the number of seats awarded via proportional representation. Most importantly, the strict laws governing new party registrations were loosened, allowing independent parties to legally participate in elections on a conditional basis. If they could obtain 1.5 percent of the national vote, the party would be awarded national registration.

Following the reforms, the PST earned conditional registration on the same day as the Mexican Communist Party (PCM) and the Mexican Democratic Party (PDM) in 1978.

=== Elections (1979–1985) ===
In the 1979 midterm elections, the PST won 10 seats in the Chamber of Deputies via proportional representation after obtaining just over 2 percent of the vote. It also secured its official national registration by meeting the 1.5 percent threshold.

In the 1982 elections, the PST nominated Cándido Díaz Cerecedo as its presidential candidate, though it had also considered endorsing the PRI candidate. Díaz Cerecedo finished in sixth place after garnering 1.45 percent of the vote. However, the PST gained a seat in the Chamber of Deputies to bring the number to 11 federal deputies.

In the 1985 midterm elections, the PST gained yet another seat in the Chamber of Deputies, giving it 12 members in the LIII Legislature of the Mexican Congress.

=== Decline and disappearance ===
The party advocated for reformism, which led to the PST often being favored by the PRI regime, along with the Popular Socialist Party (PPS), over revolutionary socialist parties like the Unified Socialist Party of Mexico (PSUM). Writer and journalist Humberto Musacchio accused the PST of posing as a left-wing party to take votes from other parties on the left and protect the PRI.

The internal conflicts in the PST continued to grow. In January 1987, members of the PST proposed changing its name to the Cardenista Party of the Mexican Workers in an effort to move away from President Miguel de la Madrid and the PRI. However, due to their history of working with the PRI, the PST and the PPS were not invited to join the five political entities (including the PSUM) which merged that April to became the Mexican Socialist Party (PMS). That same month, the PST expelled one of its founders, Graco Ramírez, from the party after he criticized their "servility" to the PRI. He refused to recognize the motion. Instead, the PST split into two factions led by Ramírez and by Rafael Aguilar Talamantes, with the Ramírez faction later expelling Aguilar Talamantes in May. The Ramírez faction also elected Jesús Ortega as "their" PST president. After months of infighting, Ramírez and his followers left the party in July to join the PMS as its sixth integrant.

In November 1987, what remained of the PST was renamed the Party of the Cardenist Front of National Reconstruction (PFCRN). The PFCRN joined the National Democratic Front coalition and endorsed its presidential nominee, Cuauhtémoc Cárdenas, in the 1988 election. The PFCRN was later renamed the Cardenista Party, though it lost its registry after the following 1997 legislative election.

== Presidents ==
Years in office	President
1975–1978	Graco Ramírez
1978–1988	Rafael Aguilar Talamantes
