= Rafael Aguilar Talamantes =

Mexican politician

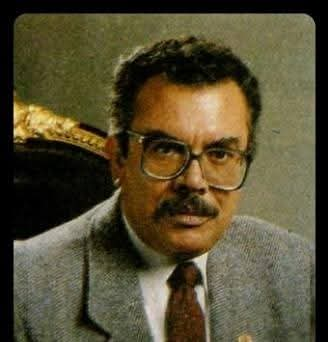

Deputy of the Congress of the Union
- In office September 1, 1982 – October 31, 1985
- In office September 1, 1988 – October 31, 1991

Personal details
- Born: Rafael Ignacio Aguilar Talamantes; 24 October 1939 Santa Rosalía, Baja California Sur
- Died: 17 July 2016 (aged 76) Mexico City
- Party: Mexican Workers' Party; Workers' Socialist Party (Mexico); Cardenist Front of National Reconstruction; Socialist Party of Mexico
- Education: National Autonomous University of Mexico
- Occupation: Politician

Rafael Aguilar Talamantes (Note: In this Mexican name, the surname is Aguilar and the second or maternal family name is Talamantes.) (October 24, 1939 – July 17, 2016) was a Mexican politician. Founder of the Socialist Workers Party and, later, the Cardenista Front Party of National Reconstruction, for which he ran in the federal elections of 1994 as a candidate for president.

== Early life and career ==
Born in Santa Rosalía, Baja California Sur, Talamantes graduated from the National School of Economics at the National Autonomous University of Mexico (UNAM) in 1962 where he attended from 1958. He returned to UNAM in 1971 to the National School of Law where he attended until 1976, leaving without completing his degree. Originally a member of the Mexican Communist Party, he became a political prisoner in 1966 apprehended in the Universidad Michoacana de San Nicolás de Hidalgo on October 8 of that year. Talamantes was imprisoned on charges of property damage to the nation.

== CNAO foundation ==
In 1970, Talamantes was released from prison due to the law of social dissolution being repealed by then president Gustavo Díaz Ordaz, many other student protesters were among those released. Aguilar soon after left the Mexican Communist Party, claiming the party had done nothing to get him out of prison. Talamantes along with other prominent members of the student movement, as well as members of the Marxist leftist movement, the Movement of National Liberation (Spanish: Movimiento de Liberación National) (MLN), formed the Comité Nacional de Auscultación y Organización (CNAO) in 1971. The organization however suffered a split between those that wanted to adopt Marxism–Leninism ideology and those that wanted to adopt a party language more in line with what they felt was the voice of the Mexican people. Demetrio Vallejo and Heberto Castillo split to form the Mexican Workers' Party (PMT), Rafael Aguilar Talamantes, along with Graco Ramírez, formed the Workers' Socialist Party (PST).

== Workers' Socialist Party ==
The Workers' Socialist Party was founded as a Marxist political party that believed in the expropriation of financial institutions and many industries, also believing management of state enterprises should be handled by the workers and peasants. The PST secured registration in 1978 and in the following year it was given proportional representation seats, continuing to win 9-12 seats the following periods in 1982 and 1985. In 1987 the PST split again as Graco Ramírez was expelled from the party, often cited as differences over the direction the party was taking.

=== Cardenist Front of National Reconstruction (PFCRN) 1987 - 1997 ===
In 1988, after having served as the party Secretary General from 1975 to '76 and President from 79-87, the party was renamed to the Party of the Cardenist Front of National Reconstruction (PFCRN). In 1987 the PFCRN allied itself with the National Democratic Front, which supported the candidacy of Cuauhtémoc Cárdenas Solórzano, a former PRI member who had left the party and was running for the presidency supported by a large number of leftist parties and organizations. Cárdenas lost the election to PRI candidate Carlos Salinas de Gortari, it is believed after massive election fraud. After the elections of 1988, Aguilar Talamantes separated from the FDN, and the PFCRN supported many of the policies of the ex-president Carlos Salinas de Gortari. In 1988 the party proportional representation in Congress rose from 12 seats to 41.

== See also ==
- List of political parties in Mexico
