= Talamantes (disambiguation) =

Talamantes may refer to:

- Talamantes, a municipality in Zaragoza, Spain
- Andrade Corner, California (formerly, Talamantes), an unincorporated community
- Melchor de Talamantes (1765–1809), Mexican independence advocate
- Rafael Aguilar Talamantes (1940–2016), Mexican politician
