= Marcela Lombardo Otero =

Mexican politician

Marcela Lombardo Otero (20 March 1926 – 5 March 2018) was a Mexican politician, the daughter of the leftist Vicente Lombardo Toledano, founder of the Popular Socialist Party (PPS). She was a deputy during the L and LIV Legislatures, from 1976 to 1979 and 1988 to 1991. In the 1988 election, she was the only female candidate from any of the parties that formed the FDN (National Democratic Front, the left wing coalition) to win her seat in Congress (for the Federal District's 38th) by majority.

== Career ==
She was the presidential candidate of the PPS Popular Socialist Party in the 1994 election, in which she obtained 0.47% of the votes. This result (second to last among nine presidential candidates) implied the loss of the official registry to her party, which was recovered in 1997, and then lost again definitely.

She was the Director of Centro de Estudios Filosóficos, Políticos y Sociales Vicente Lombardo Toledano.
