= Treviño (surname) =

Treviño is a surname of Spanish origin, It may also appear as Trevino, lacking the virgulilla (tilde). Notable people with the surname include:

== Acting ==
- Jesús Salvador Treviño (born 1946), American television director
- Mariana Treviño, Mexican actress
- Michael Trevino (born 1985), American actor

== Crime ==
- José Treviño Morales, Mexican money launderer
- Mario Ramírez Treviño (born 1962), Mexican drug lord
- Miguel Treviño Morales (born 1970), Mexican drug lord
- Omar Treviño Morales (born 1974), Mexican drug lord

== Music ==
- Juan Daniel García Treviño (born 2000), Mexican singer, actor and dancer
- Rick Trevino (born 1971), American country music artist
- Robert Treviño (born 1984), Mexican-American conductor
- Gloria Treviño (born 1968), known professionally as Gloria Trevi, Mexican singer-songwriter
- George Trevino (born 1968), American Guitarist for Doom Metal band; Las Cruces (band)

== Politics ==
- Álvaro Pérez Treviño, Mexican politician
- Humberto Benítez Treviño (born 1945), Mexican lawyer and politician
- Javier Treviño (born 1960), Mexican politician
- Jerónimo Treviño (1835–1914), Mexican governor of Nuevo Léon and general
- John Treviño Jr. (1938–2017), American politician in Austin, Texas
- Jorge Alonso Treviño (born 1935), Mexican politician
- José Luis Treviño (born 1955), Mexican politician
- Juan Francisco Treviño (fl. 1670s), Spanish governor of Santa Fe de Nuevo México (New Mexico)
- Juan Treviño de Guillamas (died before 1636), Spanish governor of Florida and Venezuela
- Manuel Pérez Treviño (1890–1945), Mexican politician
- Pedro Pablo Treviño Villarreal (born 1972), Mexican lawyer and politician

== Sports ==
=== Golf ===
- Lee Trevino (born 1939), American retired professional golfer

=== Baseball ===
- Alex Treviño (born 1957), Mexican baseball catcher, brother of Bobby
- Bobby Treviño (1945–2018), Mexican baseball outfielder, brother of Alex
- Jose Trevino (baseball) (born 1992), American baseball catcher

=== Football (soccer) ===
- Carlos Treviño (born 1993), Mexican footballer
- José Treviño (footballer) (born 1960), Mexican football player and manager
- Patricio Treviño (born 1989), Mexican footballer

=== Other ===
- Alexander Trevino (born 1981), American mixed martial artist
- Helle Trevino (born 1975), Danish–American bodybuilder
- Lee Trevino (born 1939), American professional golfer
- Radamés Treviño (1945–1970), Mexican cyclist
- Yvonne Treviño (born 1989), Mexican long jumper

== Others ==
- Blanca Treviño, Mexican corporate executive and founder of Softtek
- Elizabeth Borton de Treviño (1904–2001), American author
- Enrique Treviño Cruz, Mexican Anglican bishop
- Filemón Treviño, Mexican artist
- Jacinto B. Treviño (1883–1971), Mexican military officer
- Jesse Treviño (1946–2023), Mexican-American artist
- Joshua Treviño, American conservative political commentator
- Marisela Treviño Orta, American playwright and poet
- Mily Treviño-Sauceda (born c. 1957), American writer and trade unionist
- Philip Trevino (born 1976), American theatrical designer
- Roberto Treviño, American chef
- Rose Treviño (1951–2010), American librarian in San Antonio, Texas
- Steve Treviño (born 1978), American stand-up comedian

== See also ==
- Treviño (disambiguation)
