= Travino =

Village in Russia

Travino Травино
- Village
- Location within Vologda Oblast Location within Russia
- Coordinates: 59°37′N 45°31′E
- Country: Russia
- Region: Vologda Oblast
- District: Nikolsky District
- Time zone: UTC+3:00

Travino (Russian: Травино) is a rural locality (a village) in Baydarovskoye Rural Settlement, Nikolsky District, Vologda Oblast, Russia. The population was 115 as of 2002.

== Geography ==
Travino is located 15 km northeast of Nikolsk (the district's administrative centre) by road. Kovyrtsevo is the nearest rural locality.
