= Party of the Cardenist Front of National Reconstruction =

Party of the Cardenist Front of National Reconstruction Partido Frente Cardenista de Reconstrucción Nacional
- Abbreviation: PFCRN
- Leader: Rafael Aguilar Talamantes
- Founded: 1987 (Note: The Party was refounded in the 2010s.)
- Dissolved: 1997 (National Level); 2022 (Local Level)
- Preceded by: Unión de Ejidos Majomut; Workers' Socialist Party (Mexico)
- Succeeded by: Socialist Party of Mexico
- Headquarters: Av. Flores Magón, Mexico City
- Newspaper: Cardenista Insurgency
- Ideology: Cardenismo; Socialism
- Political position: Left-wing

The Party of the Cardenist Front of National Reconstruction (Spanish: Partido Frente Cardenista de Reconstrucción Nacional; PFCRN) also known as Cardenista Party from 1996-1997, was a Mexican political party that arose during the 1989 elections, having evolved from the coffee cooperative Unión de Ejidos Majomut.

The PFCRN won 38 pronominal seats in the Chamber of Deputies during their first elections in 1988 in part with the National Democratic Front with the Party of the Democratic Revolution along with other left-wing parties.

== Initial history and life as a political party ==
=== Background ===
The origins of the PFCRN date back to when the then-Workers' Socialist Party (PST) experienced major internal political problems leading to some of their members splitting politically.

As more members left, groundwork was laid for a new political party. Notable splits came from the former PST leader Rafael Anguilar Talamantes and the cooperative Unión de Ejidos Majomut, which was founded in 1979 by Protestants and coffee corporatives in Chiapas to oppose the Institutional Revolutionary Party and support a campesino candidate backed by the Organización Regional Indigena de los Altos de Chiapas in Chenalho. A decade later, during 1987, members of the Ejidos Majomut merged with former PST members and other small left-wing organizations to form the Cardenist Front of National Reconstruction.

=== 1988 elections ===
For the 1988 federal elections, the PFCRN joined the National Democratic Front, nominating Cuauhtémoc Cárdenas Solórzano as a candidate for the Presidency. Among the parties that supported the candidacy of Cuauhtémoc Cárdenas, the PFCRN was the one that capitalized on the greatest number of votes (9.37%) and managed to earn 38 seats in the chamber of deputies in the coalition National Democratic Front. This had the consequence that its candidates occupied the majority of the deputies that were recognized to the left alliance at that time LIV Legislature.

=== Decline and dissolution ===
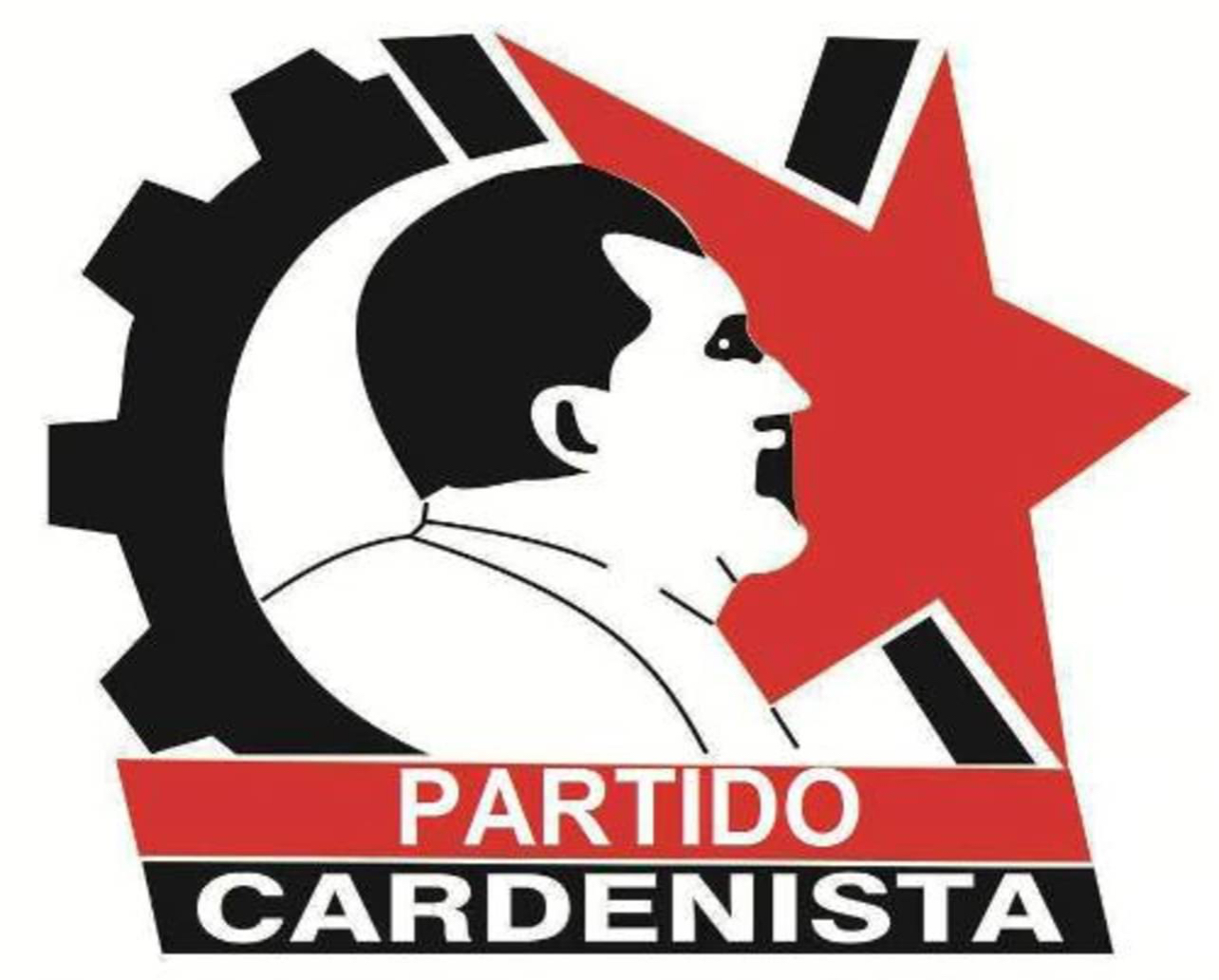
Cardenista Party official logo, 1996-1997

After the following Federal elections in 1994, the party obtained less than 1% of the votes. Three years later In 1997, the PFCRN attempted to restructure its image by adopting a simpler name, the Cardenista Party (PC) (Spanish: Partido Cardenista; PC) In that year, the PFCRN participated in the first elections for Head of Government of the Federal District and nominating the well-known journalist, Pedro Ferriz Santa Cruz as candidate. After another electoral failure in the 1997 Mexican legislative election after it failed to secure 2.0% of the total votes, the Cardenista Party lost its registration definitively and dissolved later that year.

=== State political party ===
The Cardenista Party re-emerged and obtained its registration as a state political party in Veracruz in 2013. In that state, it participated in the 2013 state elections and despite obtaining 88,267 votes (2.77%) it managed to earn 3 mayoralties (Coahuitlán, Ursulo Galván and Vega de Alatorre) and 1 multi-member council, thus preserving its registration. For the 2016 elections he was part of the Coalition to Improve Veracruz together with the PRI, PVEM, PANAL and Alternativa Veracruzana which nominated PRI senator Héctor Yunes Landa. However, the Cardenista Party was not part of the same coalition for the election of deputies, choosing its own candidates independently. Despite the Alliance with the PRI, the Cardenista Party lost its state registration by obtaining 39,556 votes (1.30%), which was less than the 3% required to maintain the party.

==== Municipal political party ====
The party renewed itself during the Veracruz Local Elections in 2021. However, it received 27,360 votes, which was less than the 3% needed to maintain its status as a state party. As a result, it was dissolved in January 2022 as a state political party. However, the PC remains a municipal party, having won the mayoralty of Oteapan following the election, serving from 2021 to 2024.

== Ideology ==
According to what is said in its statutes, the PFCRN would also have its foundation from the political and ideological thought of former president Lázaro Cárdenas.

== Party presidents ==
- (1987–1997): Rafael Aguilar Talamantes

== Presidential candidates of Mexico ==
- (1988): Cuauhtémoc Cárdenas Solórzano
- (1994): Rafael Aguilar Talamantes
