= Lomas Taurinas =

Lomas Taurinas is a neighborhood of Tijuana. It has a park called Las lomitas park and is next to the Autonomous University of Baja California. The presidential candidate of the PRI Luis Donaldo Colosio was assassinated here while on his campaign tour by Mario Aburto.
