= Mario Aburto Martínez =

Assassin of Mexican presidential candidate Luis Donaldo Colosio in 1994

- Born: 3 October 1970 (age 56); Zamora de Hidalgo, Michoacán, Mexico
- Status: Incarcerated
- Criminal charge: Assassination of presidential candidate Luis Donaldo Colosio
- Criminal penalty: 42 years in prison

Mario Aburto Martínez (born 3 October 1970) is a Mexican man who was convicted for assassinating presidential candidate Luis Donaldo Colosio in 1994. He confessed to the murder and was sentenced to 42 years in prison. Despite the confession and conviction, The New York Times reported that there was widespread belief within Mexico that the conviction involved a conspiracy and coverup mainly by Carlos Salinas de Gortari (the president at that time) and Manuel Camacho Solís (a member of Salinas' cabinet). A later Mexican film called Colosio, el asesinato alleged that the Salinas government was behind the crime.

== Early life ==
Aburto Martínez was born in Zamora, Michoacán, Mexico, to parents Rubén Aburto Cortez and Maria Luisa Martinez, and was the second of six siblings. In his early childhood, he was known to be an introverted child who enjoyed drawing. In high school, he was a very polite and punctual student with a desire to enter the construction industry, as noted by a high school teacher. This shy nature continued throughout his life. After school he helped the family working in agriculture. As he grew up, his family described him as service-oriented, with examples given of helping the women during family events. He also enjoyed sports and other activities. Throughout his life, neighbors, coworkers, and ex-partners remembered his very polite nature, mentioning how he would greet everyone, had very good manners, dressed well, and was always very well-kept.

== Life right before the assassination ==
At 19 years of age, Aburto Martínez moved to Los Angeles, California, with his father, but at 20 had to return to Mexico to help his mother and sisters. From 1990 until 1994, Aburto Martínez worked at various factories, most of which were auto factories. At this time, he expressed a desire to study at a university in the future. Mexico was experiencing a period of economic difficulty, resulting in hard times for the Aburto Martínez family.

A few events in the years prior to the assassination helped convince the authorities that Aburto Martínez was responsible for the killing. In 1991, he confessed to a coworker that he would go forward with something big in the future, which authorities later took to mean the assassination. Then in 1992, Aburto Martínez convinced his coworkers at the factory to walk out and demand better working conditions. He was fired the week following the incident.

== The assassination of Colosio and the investigation ==
On March 23, 1994, Mexico's leading presidential candidate, Luis Donaldo Colosio Murrieta, was campaigning in Tijuana, Mexico. He had recently given a speech, "Yo Veo un México" that was controversial and made many angry with him. The PRI party was undergoing many changes that year and the political situation was tense. At a political rally that evening, Colosio was shot twice. According to witnesses, the suspect who killed Luis Donaldo Colosio Murrieta was wearing a black jacket and shot Colosio in the head, shooting him again in the abdomen a few seconds later.

After Colosio was shot, what was described as a "human mountain" detained Aburto Martínez to prevent his escape before the federal police arrived to take him into custody. The police arrived as the crowd was preparing to lynch the suspect. At 5:16 pm, Aburto Martínez was arrested, immediately denying involvement in the assassination. At 5:30 pm, he was examined and asked about the events. His stories shifted throughout the investigation, at first claiming innocence, then claiming it was an accident, then blaming external powers, and discussing how he did not want to cause any harm but was being forced by police violence against him. Aburto Martínez has continuously declared his experience with torture during the investigation, claiming in the courtroom that a confession was coerced out of him. The government investigation shifted between a broader conspiracy and the lone assassin, Aburto Martínez. Although others were arrested, all other suspects related to the crime were either not investigated, did not have sufficient evidence to face judicial consequences, or were let free or acquitted. On November 1, 1994, Mario Aburto Martinez was convicted for the assassination of Mexican presidential candidate Luis Donaldo Colosio and sentenced to 42 years of prison.

=== State sponsored psychological diagnosis ===
Various notable government-sponsored psychologists diagnosed Aburto Martínez with the following: Borderline personality disorder with manipulative tendencies, psychopathic tendencies, and narcissistic tendencies. Other considerations include a family history of violence and a tendency toward anger. In Aburto Martínez's letters to family, while denying the crime, he expressed his mental health issues as coming from his time in prison and traumatic experiences during the investigation and trial.

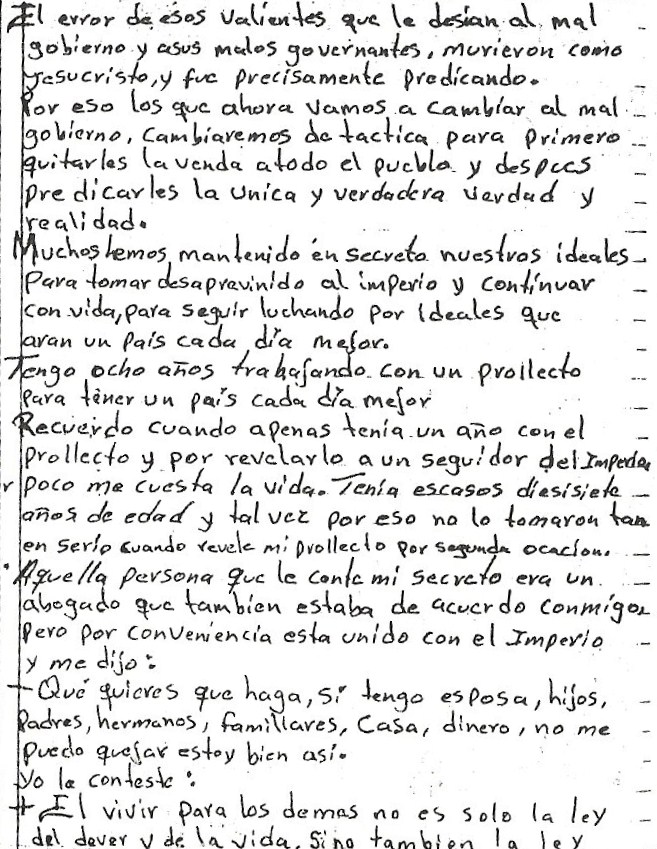

== Reaction to the arrest ==
The case surrounding Aburto Martínez was controversial for many reasons. Public sentiment was skeptical that the assassination could have been planned and executed by just one man, especially as Aburto Martínez did not seem to have a previous political reputation. A popular theory arose that the man arrested by the police was not the same man who had fired the gun at Colosio, mainly because of noticeable differences in facial hair between pictures taken and published at Colosio's assassination and the mugshots published after the arrest.

The PRI, Colosio's party, which was also the party of the administration at the time of the assassination, had governed Mexico for many decades, and some Mexicans began to believe that Colosio's opponents were involved in the murder; theories of the involvement of then-president Carlos Salinas de Gortari, as well as Colosio's main in-party opponent Manuel Camacho Solís, circulated throughout the country. The country was subsequently confused as the main prosecutor changed back and forth between announcing that Aburto Martínez had worked with a group and then later declaring that it had been a one-man job. Aburto Martínez confessed to being the only one involved, but later declared that he had been tortured into making the confession.

There was also controversy regarding the trial, and the First Court of Criminal Appeals of the Second Circuit ruled that Aburto Martínez had been tried unjustly because he'd been tried at the federal level rather than the state level. Antonio González García, a judge in the Second District for Criminal Proceedings, ordered that Aburto Martínez be added to the National Registry of the Crime of Torture (RENADET) in order for his confession to be deemed invalid under the conditions of torture.

== Conspiracies ==
Throughout Mexico, many argued and shared conspiracy theories about intentional or unintentional negligence in the investigation, as well as government and narco-trafficker involvement in the crime itself. There is a wide variety of details that support the involvement of other people, especially considering the 2 different gun types that shot Colosio practically simultaneously. Additionally, there were suspicions surrounding the cartel and political powers at the time. Many of Aburto Martinez's letters written from prison were to contact his family and emphasize the governmental corruption in Mexico.

== Family response ==
A few months after the assassination and subsequent arrest, Aburto Martínez's family immigrated to the United States without documentation in hopes of seeking asylum. The family claimed that they were not safe in Mexico, suspecting the government's involvement in Colosio's death and the ramifications that might have for their family. Aburto Martínez's father, Ruben, claimed that his son was innocent and was being used as the government's scapegoat in a scheme against Colosio. Leading up to his sentence, Aburto Martínez's family was hardly questioned by authorities.

== Recent developments ==
In 2024 the Federal Attorney General's Office declared the involvement of Jorge Antonio Sánchez Ortega in the murder of Colosio, claiming that he was responsible for one of the gunshots that killed Colosio. Sánchez Ortega was arrested in November 2025 and is a former federal intelligence agent who was assigned to be Colosio's bodyguard. Evidence suggests that Sánchez Ortega fired a gun at the scene of the crime and had Colosio's blood on his suit, added to the statements of witnesses claiming to see him escaping the scene.

Also in 2024, then president of Mexico, Andrés Manuel López Obrador, denied an appeal to pardon Aburto Martínez, who still had over 15 years left to his sentence. Leading the petition to pardon Aburto Martínez was Luis Donaldo Colosio Riojas, the son of the murdered Colosio, in order for both his "family and Mexico to heal" from the past.

== Media ==
- Fictional film by Carlos Bolado Colosio: El asesinato.
- Netflix series Historia de un crimen: Colosio.
- Netflix documentary, 1994,
