= 1985 Mexican legislative election =

Legislative elections were held in Mexico on 7 July 1985. The Institutional Revolutionary Party won 292 of the 400 seats in the Chamber of Deputies. Voter turnout was 51–52%.

== Results ==
Party	Party-list			Constituency			Total seats	+/–
Party	Votes	%	Seats	Votes	%	Seats	Total seats	+/–
Institutional Revolutionary Party	10,981,938	63.29	0	11,588,230	68.01	292	292	–7
National Action Party	2,831,248	16.32	32	2,787,218	16.36	6	38	–13
Unified Socialist Party of Mexico	602,530	3.47	12	575,121	3.38	0	12	–5
Workers' Socialist Party	593,022	3.42	12	440,751	2.59	0	12	+1
Mexican Democratic Party	507,710	2.93	12	489,025	2.87	0	12	0
Popular Socialist Party	441,567	2.54	11	349,680	2.05	0	11	+1
Authentic Party of the Mexican Revolution	416,780	2.40	9	295,434	1.73	2	11	+11
Mexican Workers' Party	291,127	1.68	6	276,712	1.62	0	6	New
Workers' Revolutionary Party	289,626	1.67	6	225,636	1.32	0	6	+6
Others	395,955	2.28	0	11,922	0.07	0	0	–
Total	17,351,503	100.00	100	17,039,729	100.00	300	400	0
Valid votes	17,351,503	94.91		17,039,729	95.30			
Invalid/blank votes	930,348	5.09		840,195	4.70			
Total votes	18,281,851	100.00		17,879,924	100.00			
Registered voters/turnout	35,278,369	51.82		35,278,369	50.68			
Source: Nohlen, Sandoval
