= 1994 Mexican general election =

- 21 August 1994
- Presidential election
- Turnout: 77.16% (▲25.15pp)
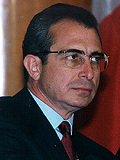

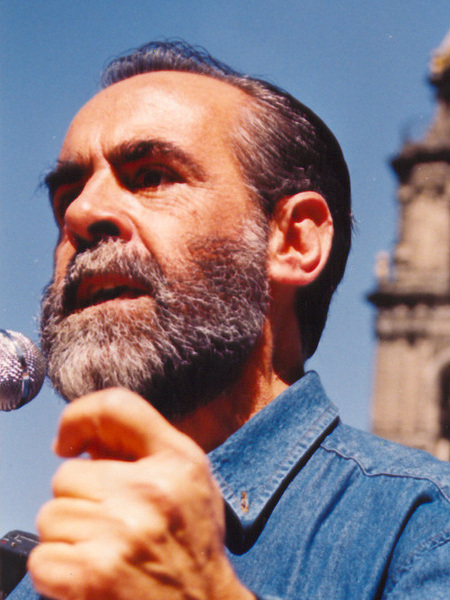

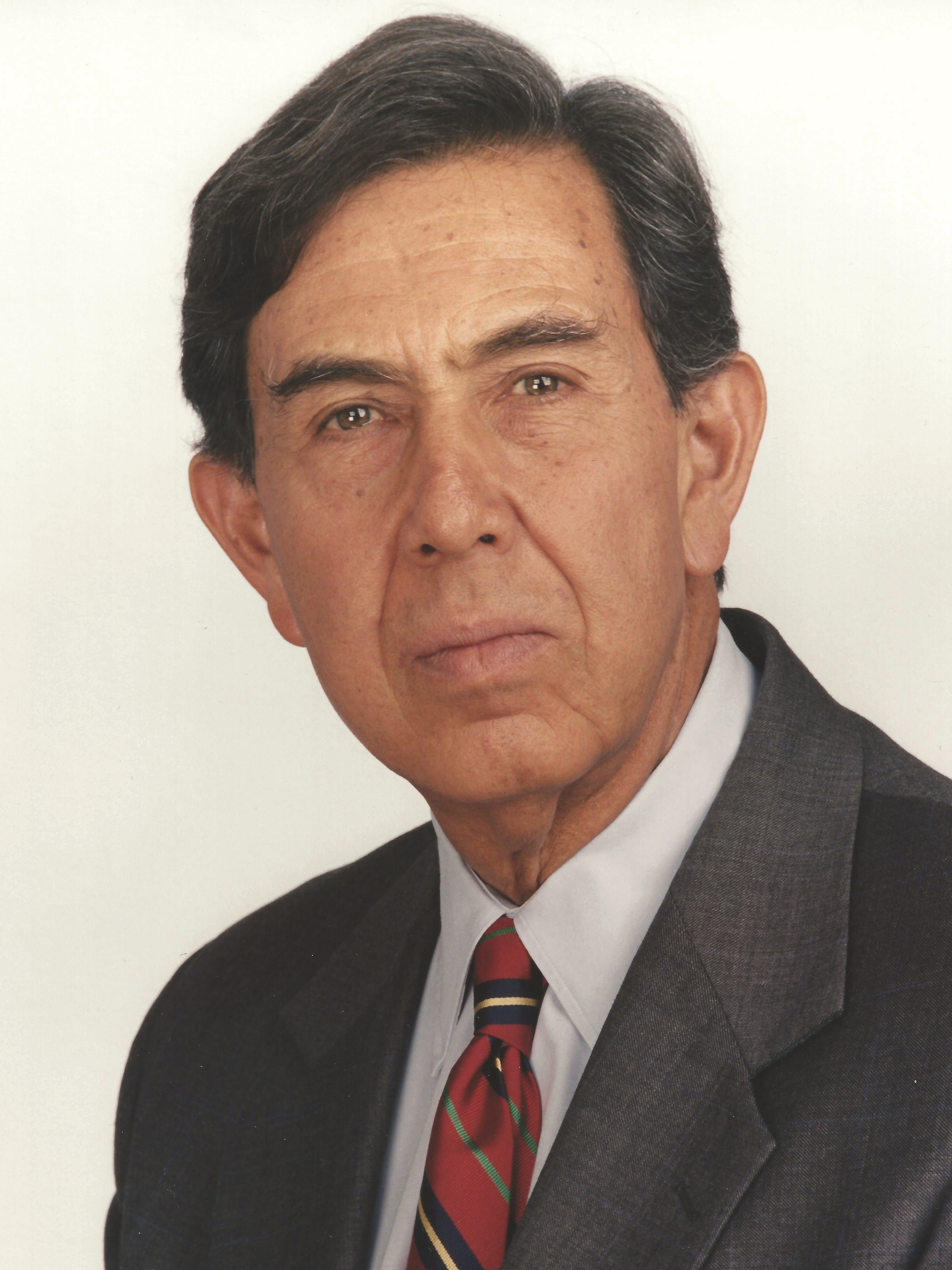
Nominee	Ernesto Zedillo	Diego Fernández de Cevallos	Cuauhtémoc Cárdenas
Party	PRI	PAN	PRD
Popular vote	17,181,651	9,146,841	5,852,134
Percentage	50.13%	26.69%	17.07%
- Zedillo (49403) Fernández (6931) Cárdenas (4368) Soto (60) González (1) Aguilar (32) Pérez (13) Lombardo (7) Madero (3) Tie (173) No data (10203)
President before election
Carlos Salinas de Gortari
PRI
Elected President
Ernesto Zedillo
PRI
- Senate
- 96 of the 128 seats in the Senate of the Republic; 65 seats needed for a majority
Party	Leader	Vote %	Seats	+/–
PRI	Ignacio Pichardo Pagaza	50.24	95	+34
PAN	Carlos Castillo Peraza	25.73	25	+24
PRD	Porfirio Muñoz Ledo	16.83	8	+6
This lists parties that won seats. See the complete results below.
Results by state
- Chamber of Deputies
- All 500 seats in the Chamber of Deputies; 251 seats needed for a majority
Party	Leader	Vote %	Seats	+/–
PRI	Ignacio Pichardo Pagaza	50.28	300	−20
PAN	Carlos Castillo Peraza	25.77	119	+30
PRD	Porfirio Muñoz Ledo	16.71	71	+30
PT	Alberto Anaya	2.65	10	+10
This lists parties that won seats. See the complete results below.

General elections were held in Mexico on 21 August 1994. The presidential elections resulted in a victory for Ernesto Zedillo of the Institutional Revolutionary Party (PRI), whilst the PRI won 300 of the 500 seats in the Chamber of Deputies and 95 of the 128 seats in the Senate. Voter turnout ranged from 77.4% in the proportional representation section of the Chamber elections to 75.9% in the constituency section.

The presidential elections were the first in Mexico to be monitored by international observers. Turnout was just over 77% of those eligible. To date, the 1994 elections mark the last time a presidential candidate won in all 31 states and Mexico City.

Although tension did not reach the level it did around the 1988 election, most political analysts agree that voters (in the aftermath of the Zapatista uprising that began in January and the assassination of the original PRI candidate Luis Donaldo Colosio), opted for continuity by allowing the PRI to remain in power, fearing that the country might otherwise be destabilized. While the election itself was generally considered clean, with no major irregularities, there was much criticism directed at the inequity of the campaigns, with the ruling PRI having a disproportionate advantage in regards to campaign financing and mass media exposure.

== Background ==
The 1994 elections took place in an atmosphere of political instability after the rise of the Zapatista Army of National Liberation (EZLN) on 1 January that year. The insurgency was a serious hit on the image that the Government wanted to portray of a developed, advanced country, and it highlighted the negative effects of the neoliberal reforms enacted by the Salinas administration.

In the previous six years, the right-wing opposition Partido Acción Nacional (PAN) had won many state elections, and was seen as a serious contender for the presidency in 1994. On the other hand, the left-wing Partido de la Revolucion Democratica (PRD), while building a wide social base, had failed to win any state governorship, which its leaders blamed on repression and electoral fraud by the PRI-controlled federal government.

== Campaign ==
=== Nominations ===
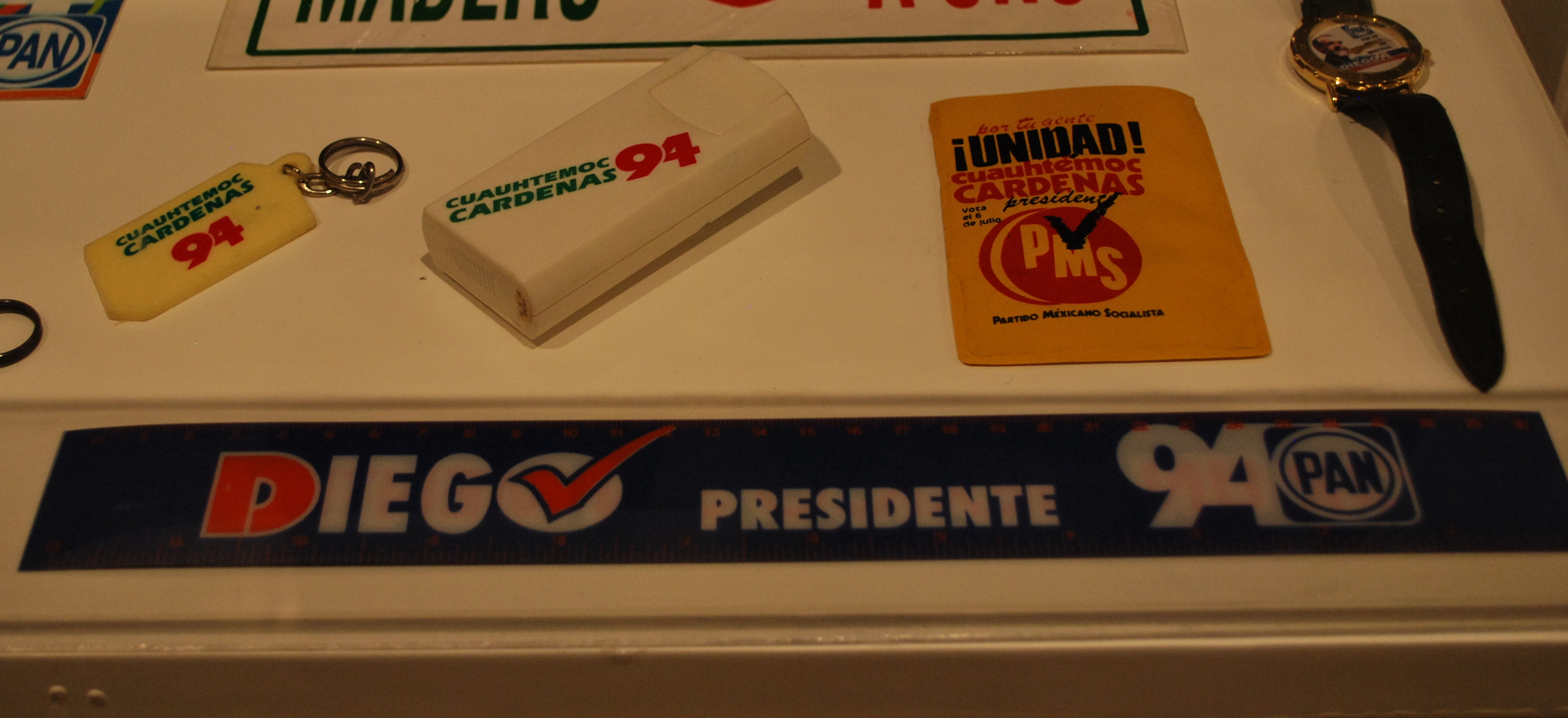
Items from the Fernández de Cevallos (PAN) and Cárdenas (PMS) campaigns

Outgoing President Carlos Salinas de Gortari chose his Secretary of Social Development, Luis Donaldo Colosio, to be the PRI presidential candidate. Salinas' choice sparked a brief internal conflict in the government, as Manuel Camacho Solís, who was then Mayor of Mexico City, had expected himself to be the PRI candidate, and quit his position in protest. President Salinas immediately appointed Camacho as Minister of Foreign Relations to hide the conflict, and tried to appease him. In the aftermath of the Zapatista uprising, Camacho was designated Peace Commissioner in Chiapas.

The PAN chose Diego Fernández de Cevallos as their candidate through an internal convention.

Cuauhtémoc Cárdenas ran for the presidency once again, this time as the candidate of the PRD, the party he founded in 1989.

Six other parties presented their candidates.

=== Early campaign ===
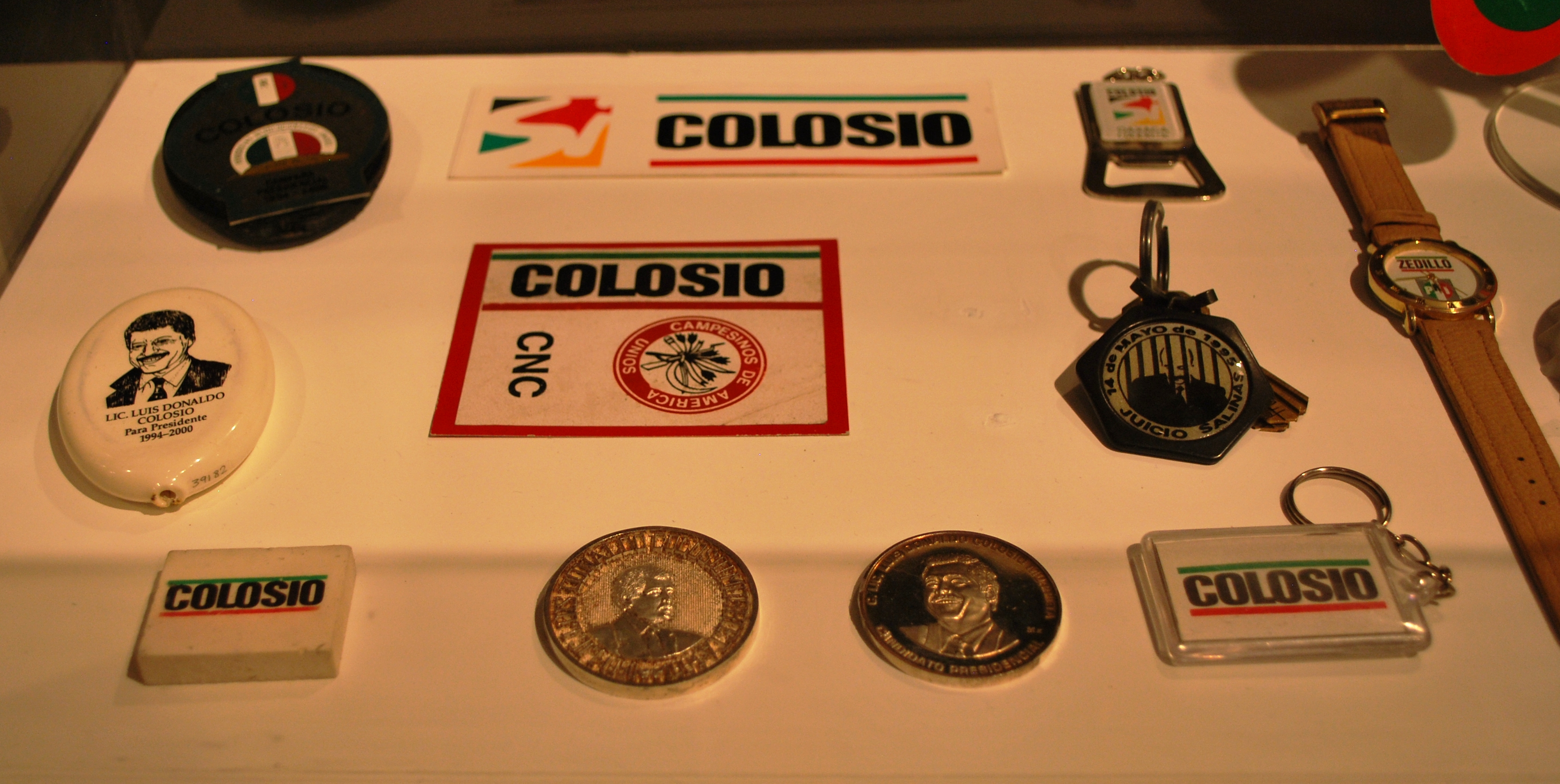
Colosio campaign items

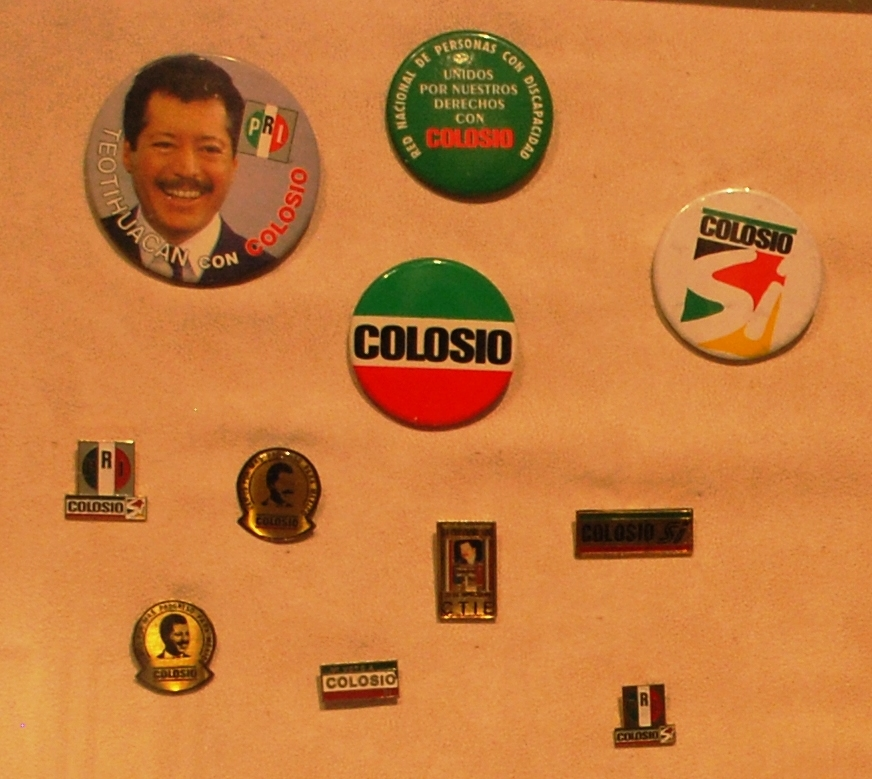
Colosio campaign buttons

In the initial months of the campaign, PRI candidate Colosio expressed dissatisfaction with his campaign management, as polls indicated his popular support was far lower than earlier PRI candidates. Colosio's campaign lacked funding and had problems getting media coverage in the wake of the Zapatista uprising in Chiapas. Due to this poor performance, the PRI leadership considered replacing Colosio as the presidential candidate. At the same time, Camacho's popularity was rising due to his role as mediator in the Zapatista conflict, and it was rumoured that he might replace Colosio as the presidential candidate. At one point, President Salinas had to state to the media "Don't get confused, Colosio is the candidate".

Due to his campaign's underperformance, Colosio tried to distance himself from the outgoing President. On 6 March 1994, the anniversary of the PRI's founding, Colosio broke with Salinas in a controversial-but-popular speech in front of the Monumento a la Revolución in Mexico City. In his speech, Colosio spoke against government abuse, and in support of indigenous peoples and the people's independence from government. The speech was controversial, as it echoed many of the beliefs of the EZLN platform.

On 22 March, Camacho himself stated that he was not interested in being the PRI candidate, instead focusing on the Chiapas conflict. The day after Camacho's statement, Colosio was killed.

=== Assassination of Colosio ===
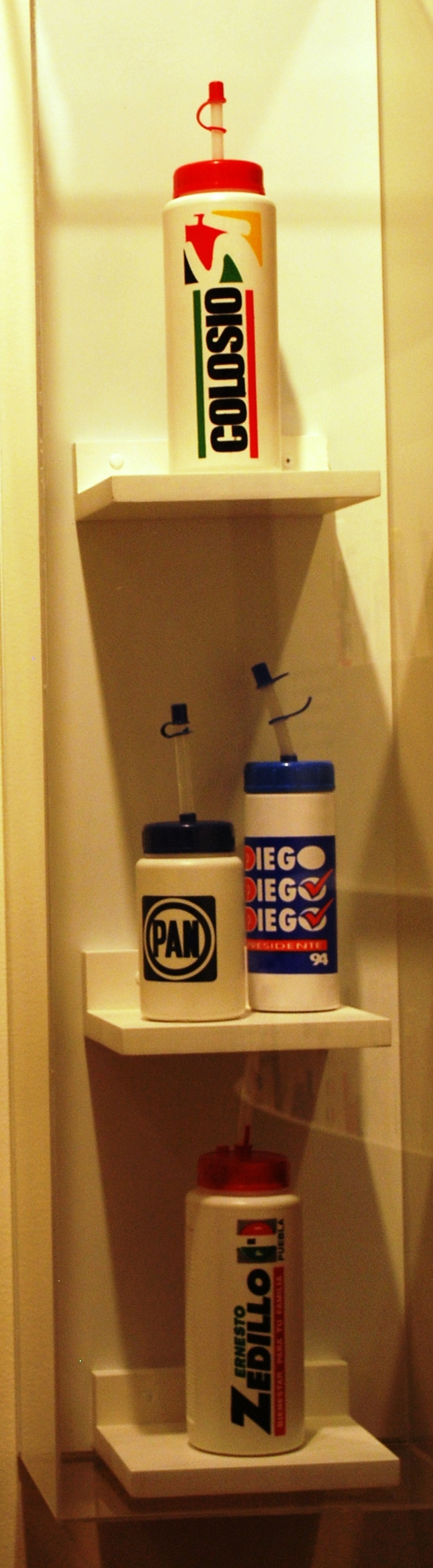
Water bottles from the Colosio, Fernández de Cevallos and Zedillo campaigns.

At 5:05 PM PST on 23 March, at a campaign rally in Lomas Taurinas, a poor neighborhood of Tijuana, Colosio was shot in the head with a .38 Special by Mario Aburto Martínez at a distance of a few centimeters. Colosio collapsed and was rushed to the city's main hospital after plans to fly him to an American hospital were cancelled. His death was announced a few hours later amid inconsistent eyewitness reports. The assassination of Colosio was the first magnicide to occur in Mexico since the murder of Álvaro Obregón in 1928.

The assassination had a profound impact on Mexican public opinion, already tumultuous by the conflict in Chiapas.

Many conspiracy theories about the assassination persist, including that it was orchestrated by drug traffickers. However, the most accepted theory among the Mexican people is that he was betrayed by his party and that the murder was orchestrated by high members of PRI, including President Salinas, as Colosio had begun to reject Salinas's political agenda.

==== The assassin, Mario Aburto Martínez ====
The shooter, Mario Aburto Martínez, was arrested at the site and never wavered from his story that he had acted alone. Nonetheless, many theories still surround the assassination. The authorities were criticized for their handling of Aburto, unusual for a detained suspect, having been shaved, bathed, and given a prison haircut before showing him to the media, which started rumors about whether a man who looked so different from the one arrested was really the murderer. Colosio received three bullet wounds, and it was never clear if they could have been done by a single person or not. The case was officially closed after many prosecutors investigated it, but after the many mishandlings of the investigation and contradictory versions, the controversy continues. Aburto remains imprisoned at the high-security La Palma facility in Almoloya de Juárez.

=== Selection of the new PRI candidate ===
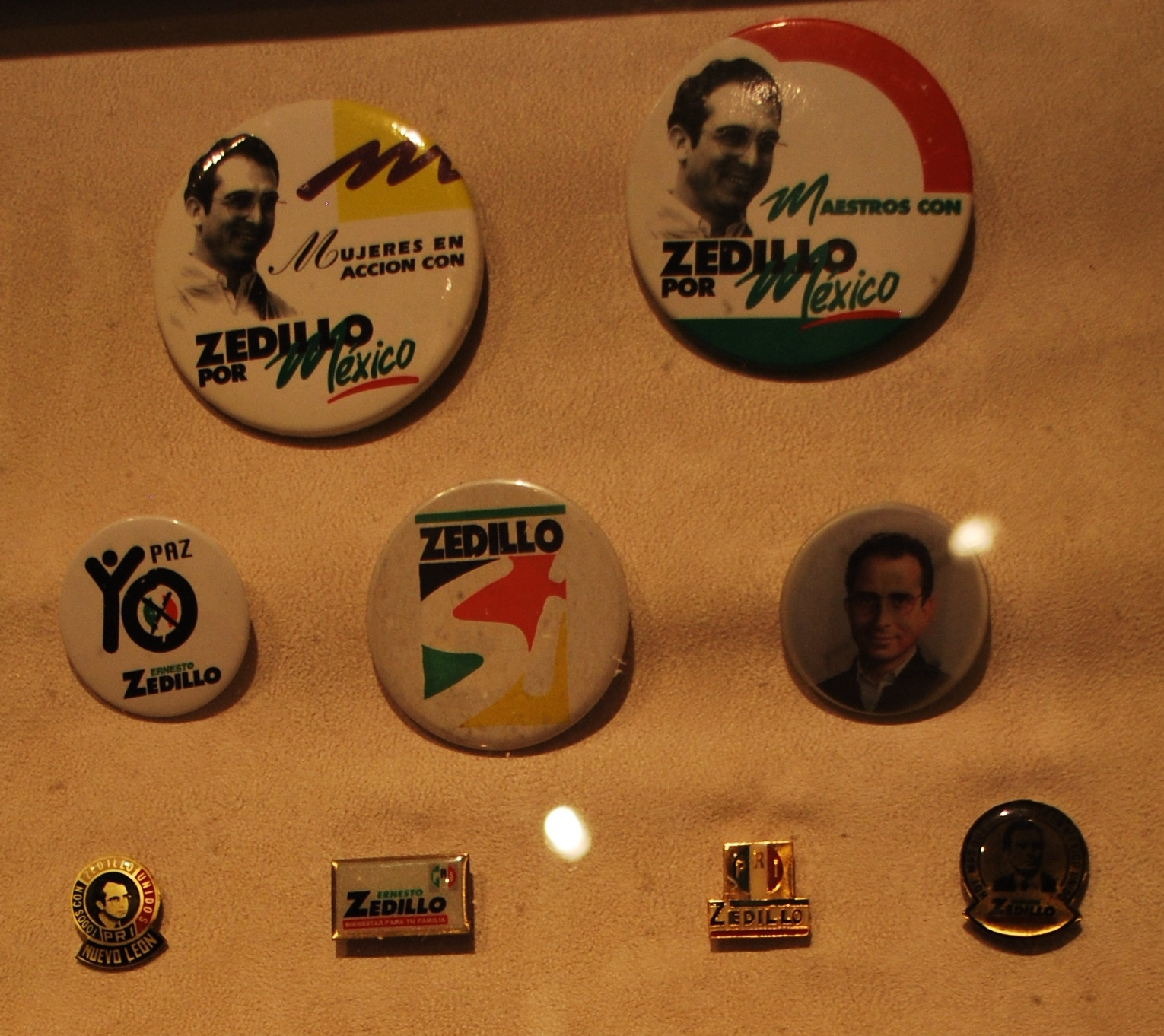
Zedillo campaign buttons

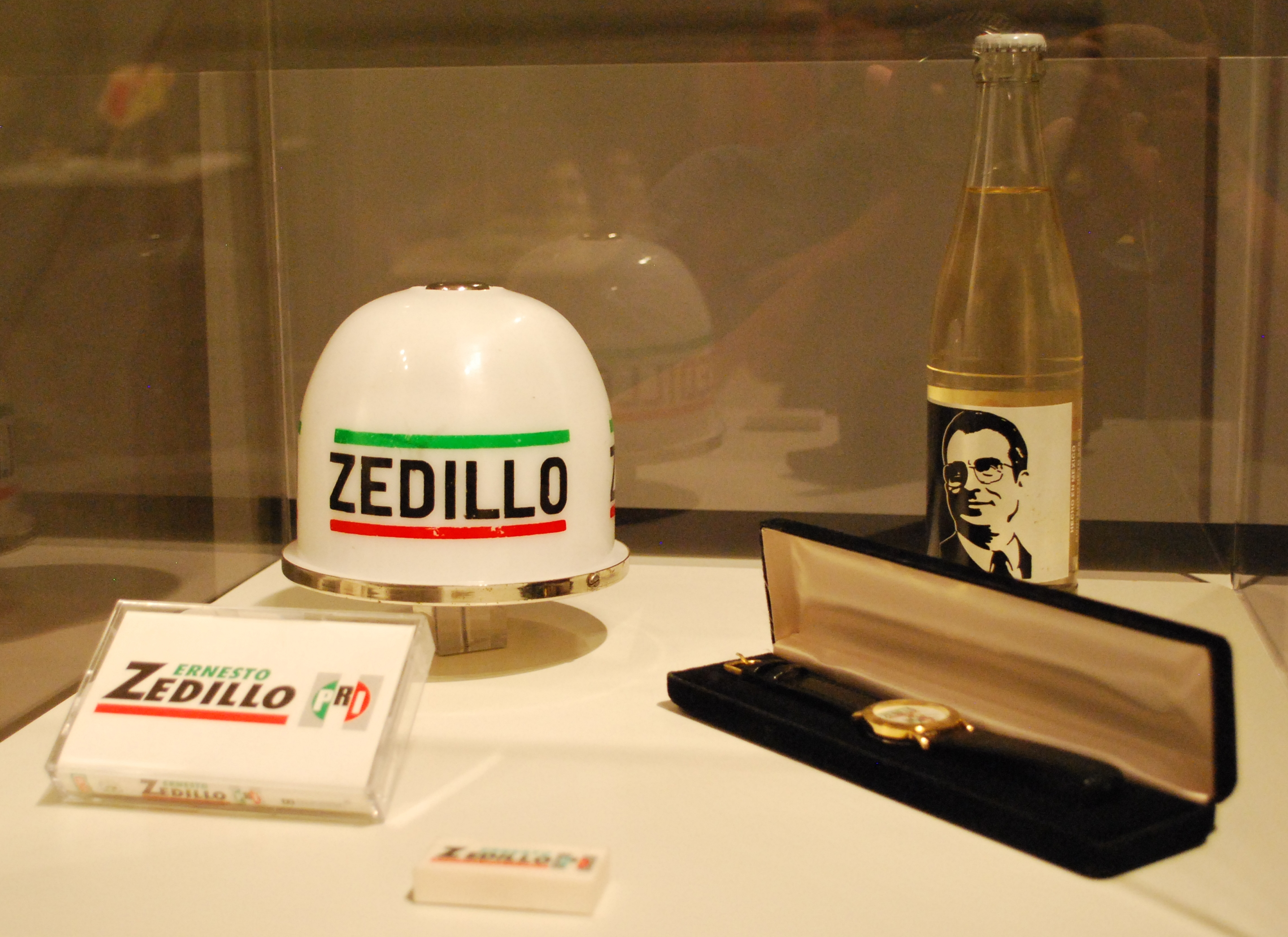
Zedillo campaign items

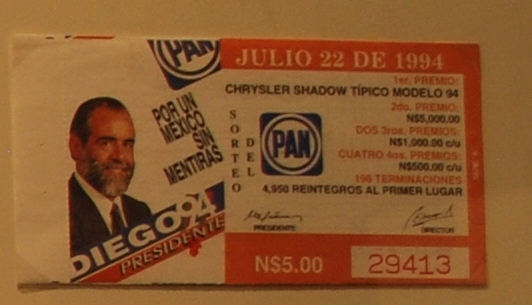
A ticket for a fundraising raffle for the Cevallos campaign

President Salinas declared three days of national mourning after Colosio's death, while all the opposition candidates lamented the assassination and called for an end to political violence.

In the aftermath, many PRI members sought to replace the dead candidate. In the end, President Salinas chose Ernesto Zedillo, who had been Colosio's campaign manager, as the new PRI presidential candidate. Zedillo had been Secretary of Education, a relatively unimportant ministry; he had resigned to run the campaign of Colosio. Zedillo had never held elective office, sharing that trait with many previous presidents, but Zedillo was not otherwise politically experienced. He was perceived as a weak candidate. It was speculated that Salinas wished to perpetuate his power as Plutarco Elías Calles had in the wake of the 1928 assassination of president-elect Alvaro Obregón, controlling successor presidents.

=== Televised debates ===
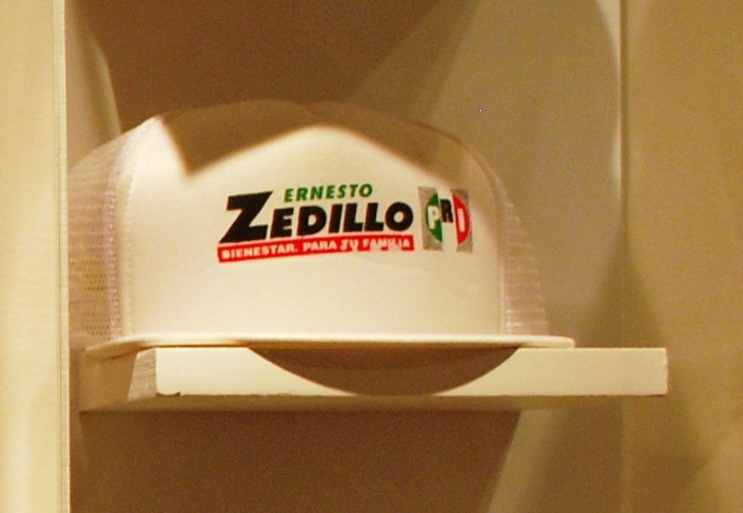
A Zedillo campaign hat, featuring his campaign's motto: "Well being for your family"

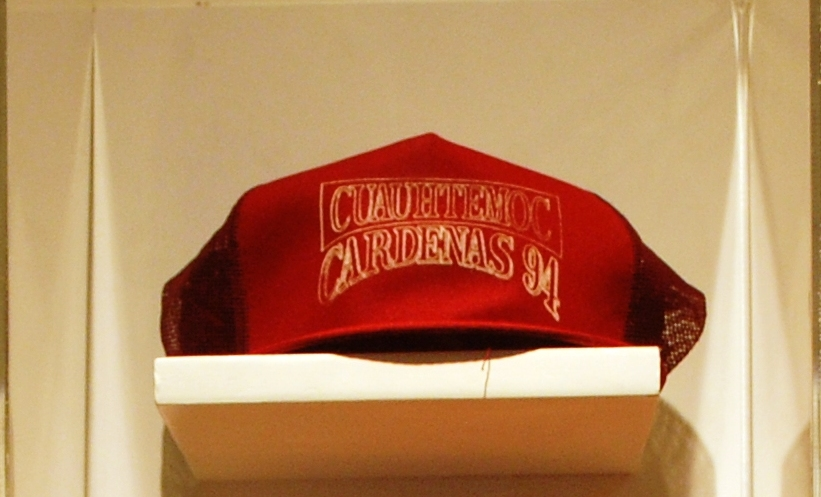
A Cárdenas campaign hat

For the first time in Mexican history, the 1994 campaign featured televised debates between the Presidential candidates. On 12 May, the three main contenders Zedillo, Fernández de Cevallos, and Cárdenas participated in the first Presidential debate in Mexican history. An estimated audience of 34 million watched the debate. Polls after the debate indicated that the PAN candidate, Diego Fernández de Cevallos, had defeated the other two candidates, and had become capable of defeating the PRI candidate in the elections.

A phone survey carried out by the Oficina de la Presidencia de la República Mexicana after the debate shows the widespread perception of Cevallos' victory in the debate, as well as Zedillo's lackluster performance and the appalling reception of Cárdenas' performance:

"Who do you think won the debate?"
Candidate	%
Cuauhtémoc Cárdenas Solórzano	1.9%
Diego Fernández de Cevallos	54.6%
Ernesto Zedillo	16.9%
No one / doesn't know / didn't watch the debate	26.6%
Survey taken from the Acervo de Opinión Pública de la Oficina de la Presidencia de la República Mexicana of the CIDE

However, in the aftermath of the debate, Fernández de Cevallos seemed to decrease his media presence, and Zedillo continued in the first place at the polls; on the other hand, the polls also indicated that Zedillo might win with less than 50% of the popular vote, something unprecedented for a PRI candidate (notwithstanding previous controversial elections in which the PRI was accused of fraud).

After the 12 May debate between the main three contenders, there was also a debate between the Presidential candidates of smaller parties.

== Opinion polls ==
Poll source	Date	PRI	PAN	PRD	Others	Undecided	Sample	Ref.
GEO/ETC	24 January 1994	49%	8%	13%	2%	28%	1,100	
GEO/ETC	20 March 1994	49%	10%	12%	5%	24%	1,100	
23 March - Assassination of Luis Donaldo Colosio
GEO/ETC	10 April 1994	46%	10%	12%	7%	26%	1,100	
12 May - First presidential debate in Mexican history
V. Voto	17 May 1994	48%	26%	9%	4%	13%	1,500	
GEO/ETC	22 May 1994	39%	26%	12%	6%	18%	1,100	
Reforma	6 June 1994	41%	29%	9%	3%	18%	2,200	
V. Voto	18 June 1994	41%	21%	8%	2%	28%	1,500	
CNA/EPI	19 June 1994	52%	29%	8%	3%	8%	1,500	
GEO/ETC	19 June 1994	44%	24%	11%	8%	13%	1,100	
CNIRT	7 July 1994	43%	22%	10%	4%	21%	2,500	
GEO/ETC	19 July 1994	47%	17%	11%	8%	17%	1,100	
V. Voto	28 July 1994	47%	17%	8%	3%	25%	1,500	
Reforma	29 July 1994	47%	17%	9%	2%	25%	2,000	
El País	1 August 1994	40%	21%	11%	6%	22%	1,500	
Belden	3 August 1994	46%	19%	9%	8%	18%	1,500	
CNIRT	7 August 1994	44%	19%	11%	4%	22%	2,500	
GEO/ETC	7 August 1994	42%	24%	11%	5%	19%	1,100	

== Results ==
=== President ===
Candidate	Party	Votes	%
Ernesto Zedillo	Institutional Revolutionary Party	17,181,651	50.13
Diego Fernández de Cevallos	National Action Party	9,146,841	26.69
Cuauhtémoc Cárdenas Solórzano	Party of the Democratic Revolution	5,852,134	17.07
Cecilia Soto González	Labor Party	970,121	2.83
Jorge González Torres	Ecologist Green Party of Mexico	327,313	0.95
Rafael Aguilar Talamantes	Party of the Cardenist Front of National Reconstruction	297,901	0.87
Álvaro Pérez Treviño	Authentic Party of the Mexican Revolution	192,795	0.56
Marcela Lombardo Otero	Popular Socialist Party	166,594	0.49
Pablo Emilio Madero	Mexican Democratic Party	97,935	0.29
Write-ins		43,715	0.13
Total		34,277,000	100.00
Valid votes		34,277,000	97.14
Invalid/blank votes		1,008,291	2.86
Total votes		35,285,291	100.00
Registered voters/turnout		45,729,053	77.16
Source: Instituto Federal Electoral

==== By state ====
Based on the official results of the Federal Electoral Institute.

State	Zedillo	Cevallos	Cárdenas	Soto	González	Aguilar	Pérez	Lombardo	Madero	Write-in	Invalid/blank
Aguascalientes	157,736	124,484	29,236	6,518	3,794	6,610	1,320	1,271	1,048	136	7,463
Baja California	402,332	297,565	68,669	15,953	7,853	3,399	2,044	3,088	1,310	1,882	18,393
Baja California Sur	80,097	46,907	9,463	3,905	786	564	386	324	242	35	2,580
Campeche	123,225	41,910	47,640	2,935	720	1,139	3,241	1,051	384	433	6,328
Chiapas	493,135	126,266	347,981	19,381	4,274	17,404	7,255	6,183	1,348	3,495	63,987
Chihuahua	660,874	308,590	68,251	39,901	5,102	3,615	2,702	3,300	1,424	640	28,751
Coahuila	359,168	226,621	97,121	17,954	3,157	14,760	5,088	2,355	816	420	15,582
Colima	102,903	60,338	24,157	2,882	1,316	3,448	424	627	1,247	548	5,354
Distrito Federal	1,873,059	1,172,438	902,199	185,903	91,839	37,370	15,402	19,084	12,246	7,157	98,706
Durango	266,837	141,818	49,793	43,351	2,466	2,712	1,950	2,181	545	602	13,833
Guanajuato	945,088	513,865	149,268	32,763	10,906	13,838	10,031	6,691	14,685	2,873	57,808
Guerrero	385,590	74,198	266,818	9,168	2,951	13,485	7,037	4,300	2,634	1,057	25,973
Hidalgo	450,800	134,171	115,693	14,988	4,992	8,668	7,253	3,442	1,107	794	29,754
Jalisco	1,050,815	1,008,234	166,226	47,854	20,023	17,464	11,566	9,528	11,289	3,181	59,081
México	2,143,122	1,179,422	835,135	150,186	82,171	45,385	22,075	26,053	14,193	4,481	114,214
Michoacán	612,040	212,921	493,236	17,729	7,606	8,542	8,584	4,293	6,160	1,130	36,124
Morelos	282,821	128,942	109,560	14,399	6,509	5,845	3,249	2,073	1,305	1,075	14,063
Nayarit	179,411	59,925	50,717	8,862	1,243	1,758	1,661	2,394	310	775	9,031
Nuevo León	723,629	596,820	44,413	89,387	5,860	2,917	2,874	2,409	2,144	2,193	31,091
Oaxaca	509,776	131,225	276,758	17,221	5,044	9,665	12,803	10,816	1,445	891	44,163
Puebla	787,493	399,942	216,200	37,141	13,263	11,750	10,850	9,493	2,885	1,196	61,865
Querétaro	275,788	149,540	26,969	11,077	2,937	3,122	1,572	2,127	1,554	231	14,419
Quintana Roo	112,546	62,006	26,301	2,665	1,304	1,550	902	1,026	174	80	5,522
San Luis Potosí	440,601	196,351	73,523	19,705	4,546	2,980	3,701	2,537	3,192	996	26,783
Sinaloa	474,882	285,207	129,025	12,059	3,982	2,973	4,383	4,098	580	835	20,680
Sonora	361,835	330,272	111,978	33,118	2,778	2,698	1,646	1,741	961	1,066	17,745
Tabasco	335,851	44,763	196,100	5,832	1,583	3,158	1,645	1,563	399	293	22,427
Tamaulipas	481,595	275,989	192,900	23,916	5,155	5,307	20,502	3,301	1,604	1,357	30,058
Tlaxcala	186,126	84,582	54,029	7,799	2,862	2,120	1,819	2,138	1,887	114	9,681
Veracruz	1,360,540	419,109	612,354	50,492	16,342	40,825	16,127	23,508	7,810	3,115	93,331
Yucatán	251,699	195,986	15,009	3,583	2,102	1,127	799	867	330	84	10,429
Zacatecas	310,237	116,434	45,412	21,494	1,847	1,703	1,904	2,732	677	550	13,072
Total	17,181,651	9,146,841	5,852,134	970,121	327,313	297,901	192,795	166,594	97,935	43,715	1,008,291

=== Senate ===
Party	Votes	%	Seats			
Party	Votes	%	Won	Not up	Total	+/–
Institutional Revolutionary Party	17,195,536	50.24	64	31	95	+34
National Action Party	8,805,038	25.73	24	1	25	+24
Party of the Democratic Revolution	5,759,949	16.83	8	0	8	+6
Labor Party	977,072	2.85	0	0	0	0
Party of the Cardenist Front of National Reconstruction	400,019	1.17	0	0	0	0
Ecologist Green Party of Mexico	438,941	1.28	0	0	0	0
Authentic Party of the Mexican Revolution	269,735	0.79	0	0	0	0
Popular Socialist Party	215,673	0.63	0	0	0	0
Mexican Democratic Party	120,419	0.35	0	0	0	0
Independents	42,251	0.12	0	0	0	0
Total	34,224,633	100.00	96	32	128	+64
Valid votes	34,224,633	96.95				
Invalid/blank votes	1,078,198	3.05				
Total votes	35,302,831	100.00				
Registered voters/turnout	45,729,053	77.20				
Source: Nohlen, IPU

=== Chamber of Deputies ===
Party	Party-list			Constituency			Total seats	+/–
Party	Votes	%	Seats	Votes	%	Seats	Total seats	+/–
Institutional Revolutionary Party	17,236,836	50.28	23	16,851,082	50.20	277	300	–20
National Action Party	8,833,468	25.77	101	8,664,384	25.81	18	119	30
Party of the Democratic Revolution	5,728,733	16.71	66	5,590,391	16.65	5	71	30
Labor Party	909,251	2.65	10	896,426	2.67	0	10	10
Ecologist Green Party of Mexico	479,594	1.40	0	470,951	1.40	0	0	0
Party of the Cardenist Front of National Reconstruction	390,402	1.14	0	379,960	1.13	0	0	–23
Authentic Party of the Mexican Revolution	290,489	0.85	0	285,526	0.85	0	0	–15
Popular Socialist Party	239,371	0.70	0	231,162	0.69	0	0	–12
Mexican Democratic Party	151,100	0.44	0	148,279	0.44	0	0	0
Independents	21,059	0.06	0	47,749	0.14	0	0	0
Total	34,280,303	100.00	200	33,565,910	100.00	300	500	0
Valid votes	34,280,303	96.82		33,565,910	96.77			
Invalid/blank votes	1,126,381	3.18		1,121,006	3.23			
Total votes	35,406,684	100.00		34,686,916	100.00			
Registered voters/turnout	45,729,053	77.43		45,729,053	75.85			
Source: Nohlen, IPU

== Aftermath ==
Neither the opposition nor international observers denounced major irregularities in the election, and Zedillo's victory was mostly accepted as definitive. However, there was considerable criticism towards the inequity regarding campaign financing and media exposure, both of which disproportionately favoured the PRI: the PRI alone was responsible for 78.3% of the reported campaign expenses in 1994, while the PAN was responsible for 10.4% and the PRD for 1.52% of said expenses. Zedillo himself stated, during an international tour in 1995, that the election which had brought him into the Presidency had been "legal, but unequal". PAN candidate Diego Fernández de Cevallos would later say that he hadn't been defeated by Zedillo, but "by [President] Salinas and Televisa". Subsequent political and electoral reforms sought to provide clear rules for campaign financing, as well as less unequal access to the mass media for the opposition parties.

== See also ==
- History of Mexico
