= Magdalena Municipality, Sonora =

Coordinates: 30°38′N 110°57′W

Magdalena
- Municipality
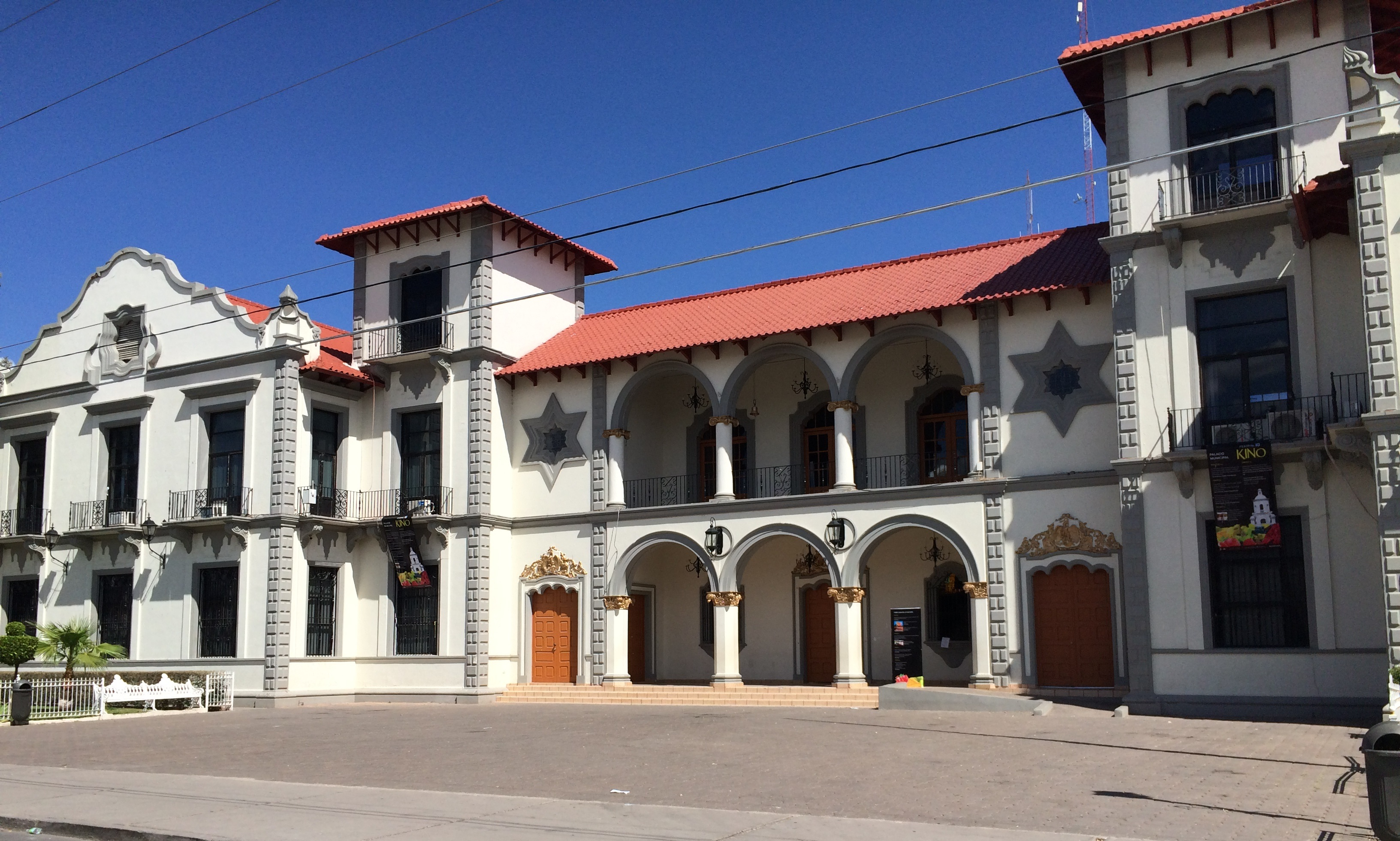
- Municipal Palace

- Coat of arms

- Location of the municipality in Sonora
- Country: Mexico
- State: Sonora
- Seat: Magdalena de Kino

Area
  - Total: 1,460.23 km^{2} (563.80 sq mi)

Population (2020)
  - Total: 33,049
- Time zone: UTC–07:00 (Zona Pacífico)
- Website: Municipio de Magdalena

Magdalena is a municipality in the state of Sonora in northwestern Mexico. In the 2020 Census, the municipality reported a total population of 33,049, up by 11.2% from the 2010 result.

The municipal seat is the town of Magdalena de Kino. It is a selected Pueblo Mágico for its scenic historical qualities.

The tomb of Spanish colonial missionary Eusebio Kino is located here.

== Geography ==
It is located in the northern part of the State of Sonora, 50 miles (80 km) south of the border with the United States; its extreme coordinates are 30° 26'- 31° 06' North latitude and 110° 44'- 111° 18' West longitude, its altitude fluctuates between a minimum of 1,640 feet (500 m) and a maximum of 6,890 feet (2,100 m) above sea level. The municipality has an area of 563.8 square miles (1,460 km^{2}) that represent 3% of the total area of Sonora.

It is bordered to the North by the municipality of Nogales, to the South by the municipality of Santa Ana (Sonora), to the East by the municipality of Ímuris and the municipality of Cucurpe, and to the West by the municipalities of Tubutama and Sáric.

== Government ==
=== Municipal presidents ===
Municipal president	Term	Political party	Notes
Enrique Campbell Noriega	1915–1917		
Enrique Woolfolk	1927		
Juan Irigoyen Monroy	1934–1935	PNR	
Ignacio Hopkins Serrano	1937–1939	PNR	
Roberto Urías G.	1939–1941	PRM	
Enrique C. Félix	1941–1943	PRM	
Lauro Grijalva López	1943–1946	PRM	
Vicente Terán Carrillo	1946–1949	PRI	
Arturo Moreno Federico	1949–1952	PRI	
Arturo Fernando Félix	1952–1955	PRI	
Luis E. Donnadieu	1955–1958	PRI	
Arturo Soto Maldonado	1958–1961	PRI	
Álvaro Trelles Serna	1961–1964	PRI	
Gerardo G. Nava	1964–1967	PRI	
Manuel Félix Castro	1967–1970	PRI	
Luis Gallardo Valenzuela	1970–1973	PRI	
Alicia Arellano Tapia	1973–1976	PRI	
José de Jesús Rochín Durazo	1976–1978	PRI	
Roberto Terán Woolfolk	1978–1979	PRI	
Trinidad del Villar del C.	1979–1982	PRI	
Luis Colosio Fernández	1982–1985	PRI	
Zarina Fernández Moreno	1985–1988	PRI	
Gilberto Jayassi Parra	1988–1991	PRI	
Alejandro Soto Bastián	1991–1994	PRI	
Severino Colosio Fernández	1994–1997	PRI	
Mario Rochín Durazo	1997–2000	PRI	
Luis Norberto Fernández Riesgo	2000–2003	PAN	
Luis Alfonso Robles Contreras	16-09-2003–15-09-2006	PRI	
Adriana Hoyos Rodríguez	16-09-2006–15-09-2009	PRI; Panal	Alliance PRI Sonora-Panal
Luis Melecio Chavarín Gaxiola	16-09-2009–15-09-2012	PRI; PVEM; Panal	
Jesús Rodolfo Martínez Leal	16/09-2012–15-09-2015	PAN; Panal	
Luis Alfonso Robles Contreras	16-09-2015–15-09-2018	PRI; PVEM; Panal	Coalition "For an Honest and Effective Government"
Francisco Javier Zepeda Munro	16-09-2018–15-09-2021	PAN; PRD	
Omar Ortez Guerrero	16-09-2021–	Magdalena Libre e Independiente	
Francisco Arturo Duarte Valdez	16-09-2024–	PAN; PRI; PRD	
