= Magdalena de Kino =

City of Sonora, Mexico

Coordinates: 30°37′N 111°03′W

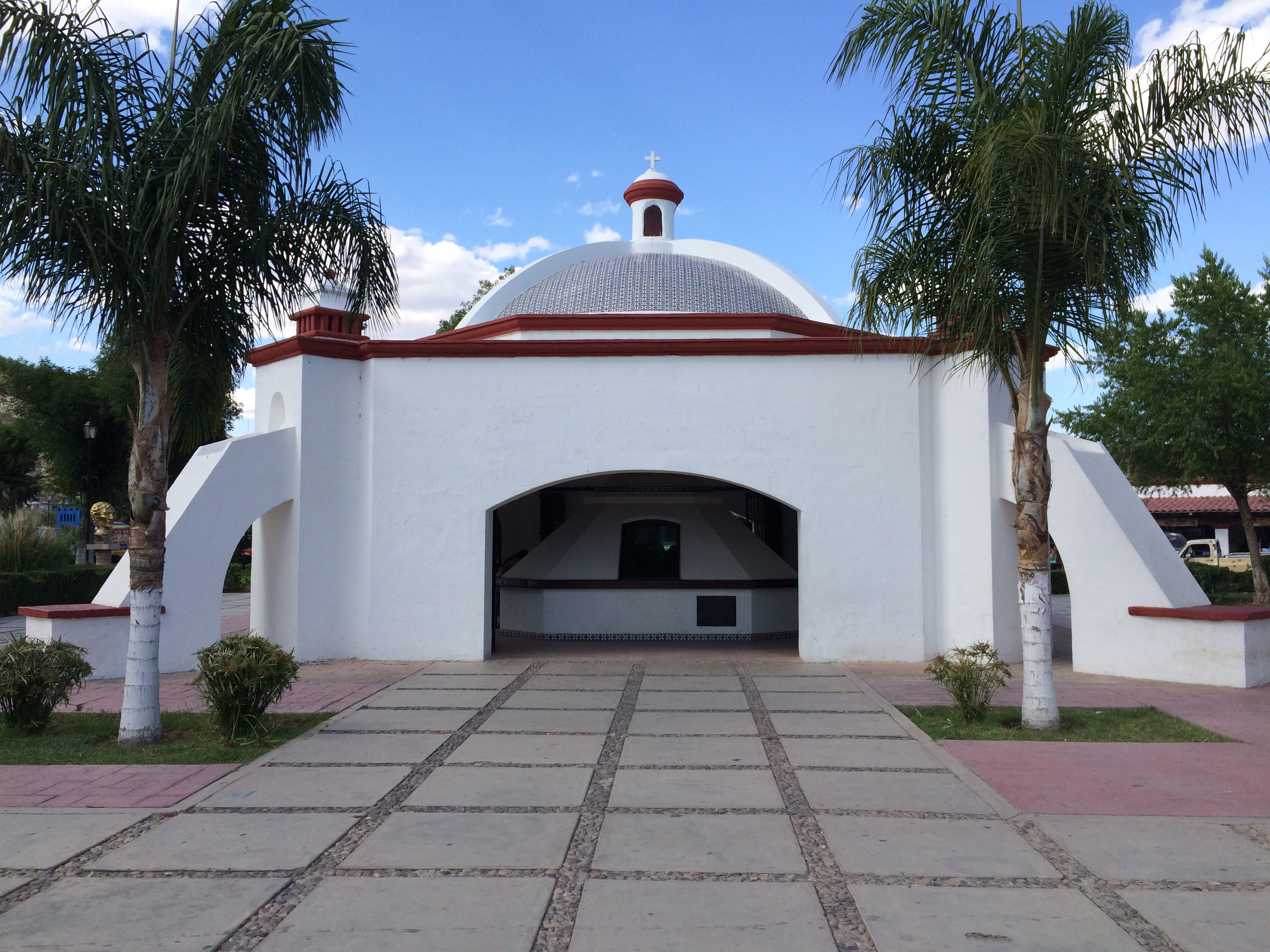
Crypt and monument to Eusebio Kino, at Magdalena

Magdalena de Kino (Spanish pronunciation: [maɣðaˈlena ðe ˈkino]) is a city, part of the surrounding municipality of the same name, located in the Mexican state of Sonora covering approximately 560 square miles (1,460 square kilometers). According to the 2005 census, the city's population was 23,101, and the municipality's was 25,500. Magdalena de Kino is in the northern section of Sonora 50 miles (80 kilometers) from the Mexico-U.S. border. To the north the municipality abuts Nogales; to the south, the municipality of Santa Ana; to the east, Ímuris and Cucurpe; and to the west, the municipalities of Tubutama and Sáric. Its main sectors include San Ignacio, San Isidro, Tacicuri, and Sásabe. The city was named after the pioneer Roman Catholic missionary and explorer, Father Eusebio Francisco Kino, who worked in the area, as well as in the present-day US state of Arizona.

== History ==
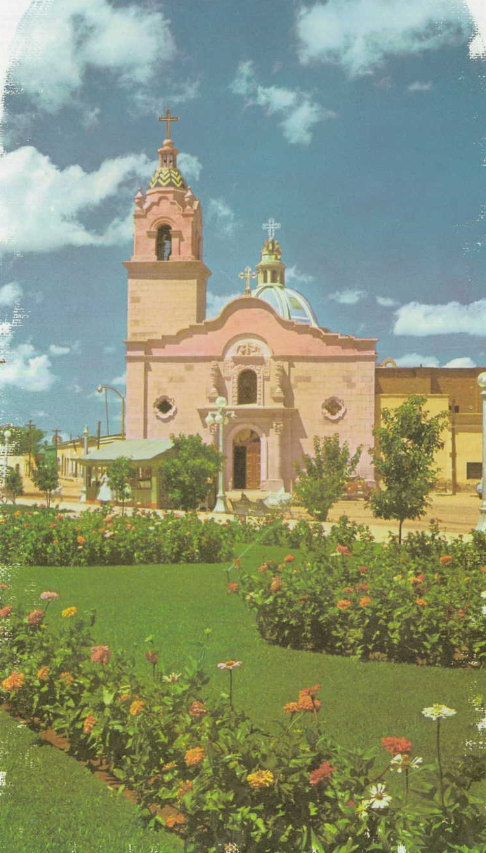
Magdalena de Kino in 1961

Originally, the territory was populated by the Papagos (Tohono O'odham) and Pimas (Akimel O'odham). The first missions were established in 1687, with the arrival of Eusebio Francisco Kino.

Mission Santa María Magdalena de Buquivaba was Kino's personal headquarters from about 1690. The first chapel was built by Jesuit missionary Luis María Pineli in 1690 or 1691, and burned by natives in 1695 as retaliation for La Matanza.

The chapel was rebuilt beginning in 1705, under the supervision of Agustín de Campos. Kino died in Magdalena in 1711, and was buried in the chapel. The municipal seat was founded at the beginning of the 18th century by Lieutenant Juan Bautista Escalante.

Native raiders repeatedly destroyed the mission complex during the eighteenth century. It was rebuilt in 1730, and destroyed again in 1757. Raiders attacked again in 1776, when Pedro Font was the missionary in residence. A new church had been erected by 1851.

== Geography ==
=== Climate ===
Climate data for Magdalena de Kino (1991–2020 normals, extremes 1987–2023)
Month	Jan	Feb	Mar	Apr	May	Jun	Jul	Aug	Sep	Oct	Nov	Dec	Year
Record high °C (°F)	32 (90)	36 (97)	38 (100)	41 (106)	46 (115)	48 (118)	48.5 (119.3)	48 (118)	45 (113)	41 (106)	39 (102)	32 (90)	48.5 (119.3)
Mean daily maximum °C (°F)	21.6 (70.9)	23.0 (73.4)	26.8 (80.2)	30.7 (87.3)	35.1 (95.2)	40.0 (104.0)	38.7 (101.7)	37.7 (99.9)	36.3 (97.3)	32.3 (90.1)	26.3 (79.3)	21.0 (69.8)	30.8 (87.4)
Daily mean °C (°F)	12.7 (54.9)	14.1 (57.4)	17.2 (63.0)	20.5 (68.9)	24.7 (76.5)	30.0 (86.0)	30.7 (87.3)	29.9 (85.8)	28.2 (82.8)	23.0 (73.4)	17.0 (62.6)	12.4 (54.3)	21.7 (71.1)
Mean daily minimum °C (°F)	3.8 (38.8)	5.3 (41.5)	7.7 (45.9)	10.3 (50.5)	14.3 (57.7)	20.0 (68.0)	22.7 (72.9)	22.2 (72.0)	20.0 (68.0)	13.6 (56.5)	7.8 (46.0)	3.8 (38.8)	12.6 (54.7)
Record low °C (°F)	−6.5 (20.3)	−7 (19)	−1 (30)	2 (36)	4 (39)	9 (48)	12.5 (54.5)	0 (32)	12 (54)	−1 (30)	−3 (27)	−6.5 (20.3)	−7 (19)
Average precipitation mm (inches)	27.1 (1.07)	35.6 (1.40)	21.8 (0.86)	7.2 (0.28)	3.2 (0.13)	16.2 (0.64)	98.3 (3.87)	120.3 (4.74)	67.7 (2.67)	18.3 (0.72)	23.7 (0.93)	32.3 (1.27)	471.7 (18.57)
Average rainy days	3.8	3.8	2.8	0.9	0.8	2.8	11.1	11.0	6.6	2.1	2.4	4.2	52.3
Source: Servicio Meteorológico Nacional

== Economy ==
Agriculture is a key economic activity throughout the municipality. Of the 3,300 acres (13 km^{2}) of arable land, 2,800 (approximately 85%) are irrigated. Crops include fruit, wheat, maize, common bean and sorghum. Cattle ranching is also an important source of income within the municipality. Mission Garden in Tucson, Arizona, includes an area that shows historical Mexican influences on the region's agriculture. The design of that area reflects modern-day Magdalena de Kino.

The industry employs approximately 2,000 individuals, primarily at the various maquiladoras. In addition, the city's businesses produce beverages, construction and furniture.

== Primary tourist attractions ==
Magdalena de Kino has 6 hotels and 6 bars/restaurants and several sites of interest to tourists, including:

- The Temple of Santa María Magdalena, with an image of San Francisco Xavier, is an important historical figure for both Sonora and the neighboring U.S. state of Arizona.
- The Grave of Father Kino, who died in the year 1711 is interred in a crypt near the mission he founded. The monument was constructed in 1966 after the discovery of Father Kino's remains.
- The Father Kino Museum, with architectural designs by Marco Antonio Ortez, where objects of the indigenous cultures of the region are exhibited, including photographs, weaponry and clothing.
- The Mausoleum of Luis Donaldo Colosio Murrieta and his wife Diana Laura Riojas de Colosio, is located in the municipal pantheon.
- Numerous buildings are constructed of stone with engravings reflecting the history of the municipality and Mexico in general.

== Notable people ==
- Luis Donaldo Colosio – presidential candidate, PRI movement member, assassinated in Tijuana in 1994.
- Alejandro Gallardo – football player, 2005 FIFA U-17 World Championship winner. Last played for the Soles de Sonora in the Major Arena Soccer League.
- Brothers Luis and Ramón Urías – professional baseball players who have played in the Major League Baseball.

== References in popular culture ==
Magdalena de Kino is the subject of the song "Magdalena" by the Killers frontman Brandon Flowers, off his debut solo studio album Flamingo.

Magdalena de Kino was also a filming site for Fast and The Furious.

== International relations ==
=== Twin towns – Sister cities ===
Magdalena de Kino is twinned with:

- Guadalajara, Mexico
- (United States) Temple City, California
- (United States) Sahuarita, Arizona
