= Agrupación de Trabajadores Latinoamericanos Sindicalistas =

Latin American trade union confederation

Agrupación de Trabajadores Latinoamericanos Sindicalistas or ATLAS was a Latin American trade union confederation in the early 1950s.

== History ==
During the first presidency of General Juan Perón, "workers attaches" were stationed at Argentina's Latin American embassies encouraging the creation of Peronist trade unions. After years of preparation, the Argentinian CGT called a conference of trade unions in Asunción, Paraguay in February 1952. This conference decided to set up a preparatory committee to create a new inter-American trade union confederation. With the help of the Mexican trade union CROM a general congress was held in Mexico City which launched the new Agrupación de Trabajadores Latinoamericanos Sindicalistas.

The CGT had been barred from addressing the founding conference of Confederación Interamericana de Trabajadores (forerunner of ORIT), due to their criticism of U.S. trade union policies. The leader of the CROM delegation, Luis Napoleón Morones, had protested this move at the CIT conference. Moreover, CGT was barred from joining ORIT once it was formed.

Headquartered in Buenos Aires, ATLAS began an intense campaign across Latin America. Its propaganda emphasized that it wished to "humanize capitalism", and provide a "third way" in the Latin American labour movement (different from the pro-U.S. ORIT and the pro-communist CTAL), arguing that Latin American trade unions should build unity without 'external' interference. Vincente Lombardo Toledano, leader of CTAL, on the other hand sought unity in action between CTAL and ATLAS (which like CTAL took up anti-imperialist positions), a move which was rejected by ATLAS.

In 1954 the Venezuelan pro-Pérez union federation CNT joined ATLAS. ATLAS also financed the Confederación Nacional de Trabajadores of Colombia, that favored Rojas Pinilla.

ATLAS disappeared as a functioning organization in 1955, with the overthrow of Juan Domingo Perón in Argentina. The CGT and ATLAS offices where stormed by the junta forces in November, and closed down. In 1973, with Peron's return to power, the general secretary of the CGT announced the revival of ATLAS, but the attempt foundered.

== See also ==
- José Alonso, Argentine representative of the CGT present at foundation
