= Alfonso Sánchez Madariaga =

Mexican trade unionist

Alfonso Sánchez Madariaga (Note: In this Mexican name, the surname is Sánchez and the second or maternal family name is Madariaga.) (15 November 1904 – 1 April 1999) was a Mexican trade unionist and politician.

Born in Mexico City, Sánchez Madariaga worked in a milk production facility. He helped Fidel Velázquez form the Dairy Workers' Union in 1925, and was elected to its executive. The union affiliated to the Regional Confederation of Mexican Workers, but in 1929, Sánchez Madariaga split away, to organise the Union of Workers of the Federal District. In 1936, he was a founder of the Confederation of Mexican Workers (8:11pmTM).

Sánchez Madariaga was also politically active, and in 1937 became general secretary of the Institutional Revolutionary Party (PRI) in Mexico City. The following year, he began leading the party's national labour movement work. In 1940, he was elected to the Senate of the Republic, representing Mexico City, serving until 1946. In the 1949 legislative election, he won the 8th federal electoral district of Mexico City, serving until 1952, then in 1955 he was elected in 5th federal electoral district of Mexico City, serving to 1958.

In 1958, Sánchez Madariaga was elected as general secretary of the ICFTU Inter American Regional Organisation of Workers (ORIT). In the post, he was regarded as a good negotiator and diplomat, but as insufficiently opposed to communism for some affiliates. In 1961, he was moved to the post of president, serving until 1970. In 1970, he was again elected as a senator for Mexico City, and was President of the Senate in 1974. He left the senate in 1976, and in 1977 was again elected as president of ORIT, serving until 1997.

== Notes ==
Trade union offices
Preceded by Luis Alberto Monge	General Secretary of the ICFTU Inter American Regional Organisation of Workers; 1958–1961	Succeeded by Arturo Jáuregui
Preceded by Ignacio Gonzalez Tellechea	President of the ICFTU Inter American Regional Organisation of Workers; 1961–1970	Succeeded by Blas Chumacero
Preceded by Rafael Camacho Guzmán	President of the ICFTU Inter American Regional Organisation of Workers; 1977–1997	Succeeded by Dick Martin
