= Fidel Velázquez Sánchez =

Mexican politician

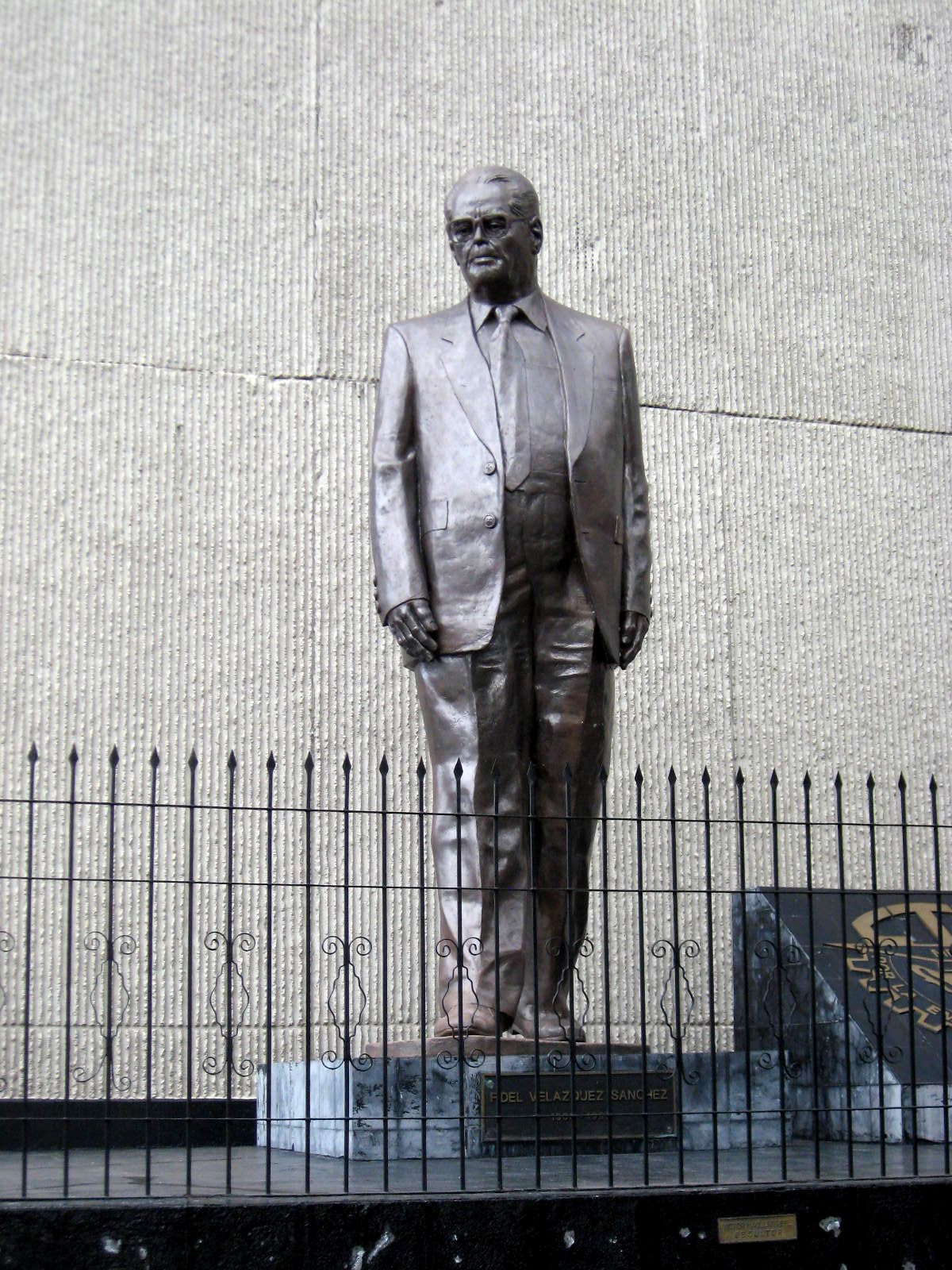
Statue of Fidel Velázquez which stands in front of the INFONAVIT office in Mexico City

Fidel Velázquez Sánchez (May 12, 1900 – June 21, 1997) was the preeminent Mexican union leader of the 20th century. In 1936 he was one of the original founders, along with Vicente Lombardo Toledano, of the Confederation of Mexican Workers (CTM), the national labor federation most closely associated with the ruling party, the Institutional Revolutionary Party (PRI). He replaced Lombardo as the leader of the CTM in 1941, then expelled him from it in 1948. He led the CTM, which grew increasingly corrupt and conservative, until his death in 1997.

== Early years ==
Velázquez was born in San Pedro Azcapotzaltongo (now Villa Nicolás Romero), State of México. His father was the mayor of the town. The family moved to Puebla, Puebla, during the Mexican Revolution.

After his father's death in 1920 Velázquez moved to the Azcapotzalco area of Mexico City, where he worked, among other things, delivering milk. In 1923 he organized a union of milk industry workers, which he affiliated with the Confederación Regional Obrera Mexicana, (CROM), the largest and most powerful union confederation of the day and a key supporter of the regimes of Plutarco Elías Calles and Álvaro Obregón.

In 1928 former President Obregón was assassinated by a right-wing Roman Catholic associated with the Cristero movement. While neither CROM nor its leader, Luis N. Morones, had any connection to the crime, Calles (who was about to finish his term of office and to begin his run as éminence grise behind the presidency in the period known as El Maximato) considered Morones the intellectual author of the assassination because he had denounced Obregón's plans to amend the constitution to allow himself to serve another term as President of Mexico. Obregón's successor, Emilio Portes Gil – a forced ally of Calles due to the upheaval created by Obregón's assassination – fired CROM officials from their government posts and threw the government's support to rival union groups, such as the Confederación General de Trabajadores, (CGT), a nominally anarchist group, and the Confederación Sindical Unitaria de México, a group associated with the Mexican Communist Party (PCM). The CROM began to disintegrate once it lost state support.

Velázquez and Jesús Yuren, head of the Union of Cleaning and Transport Workers, withdrew their unions from the CROM and, on February 25, 1929, organized the Confederación Sindical de Trabajadores del Distrito Federal (CSTDF), a federation of unions within the Federal District. The CSTDF was a hodgepodge, much like the Knights of Labor in the United States in the nineteenth century: it included the two unions led by Velázquez and Yuren, street vendors and merchants organizations, the "unión blanca" or company union of streetcar workers composed largely of strikebreakers, a union of homeopathic doctors, grave diggers and bottling plant workers.

Three other union leaders, Fernando Amilpa, Alfonso Sanchez Madriaga and Luis Quintero, took their unions out of CROM to affiliate with the CSTDF shortly thereafter. When Morones stated that he was glad to be rid of these "worms," a CGT union leader reportedly said, "They are not worms, but wolves and will soon eat up the chickens in the hutch." The five were thereafter known as los cinco lobitos, or "the five little wolves".

Velázquez played an active role in trade union affairs in the early 1930s: he was a member of the commission that edited the new Federal Labor Law in 1931, took part in proceedings before the Federal Labor Board, which had the power to register unions or declare a strike legal or illegal, and established ties with both the governmental representatives on the Board and with the employers. As a wave of labor militancy came to México in the wake of the worldwide depression of the 1930s, Velázquez, leaders of the CGT, and Lombardo Toledano, who had also left CROM, founded the Confederación General de Obreros y Campesinos de México (CGOCM) or General Confederation of Workers and Peasants of Mexico, on June 28, 1933.

== Founding the CTM ==
The CGOCM became the most important union body in Mexico, leading a number of strikes in 1934. When President Lázaro Cárdenas called on unions for support in resisting a threatened coup by Calles and opposing an employers' strike in Monterrey, the CGOCM and the PCM rallied to his defense.

Cárdenas also called on these unions to form a single unified body. The CGOCM transformed itself into the Confederación de Trabajadores de México, or CTM, in response.

The CTM almost disintegrated at the moment of its formation. While Lombardo Toledano was a convinced Stalinist and the most important representative of the Soviet Union in Mexico and Latin America for the decade after his visit to the Soviet Union in 1935, he was never a member of the PCM. At the founding convention of the CTM, the PCM and the industrial unions it had organized had been promised the position of organizational secretary, the second most powerful position within the CTM. When Lombardo Toledano gave that position to Velázquez, the left unions walked out of the convention. Under pressure to preserve unity, however, they returned and grudgingly assented to Velázquez's election.

The PCM and its unions almost walked out of the CTM a second time the following year. Earl Browder, then head of the Communist Party USA, urged them to accept "unity at all costs", and they returned. The CTM (along with the CGT, CROM and the electrical workers union) formally aligned with the Partido Revolucionario Mexicano, the precursor of the PRI. as its "labor sector" in 1938.

As part of the party, and therefore effectively part of the state, the CTM received a number of tangible benefits. The Federal Labor Boards, which had the power to determine which unions could represent workers and which strikes were legal, consistently favored the CTM against its rivals. Over time, the CTM became dependent on the PRI and the state for financial support as well: the PRI provided CTM with subsidies, while the CTM in return required all workers to join the union recognized at their workplace and, by extension, the PRI. The PRI also provided CTM leaders with positions at all levels of government and reserved at least one Senatorial position for a CTM leader.

On the other hand, Cárdenas took steps to ensure that CTM did not acquire so much power that it could be independent of the party. He prohibited the CTM from representing government employees, creating a separate union federation for these workers, and barred the CTM from admitting farm workers to membership.

== Taking over the CTM ==
As organizational secretary, Velázquez involved himself in the day-to-day decisions of the organization, building up a power base of patronage. When Lombardo Toledano stepped down as general secretary of the CTM at the end of his term, Velázquez took his place on February 28, 1941. In 1946, the CTM joined in forming the new PRI, becoming one of its constituent parts. As the formal division between the PRI and the state was blurred, the distinctions between the CTM and the party and the state likewise became harder to discern.

Lombardo Toledano had remained active in the CTM after Velázquez replaced him. That changed, however, after Lombardo Toledano broke with the PRI in 1947, forming the Partido Popular. The CTM not only refused to endorse the new party, but expelled Lombardo Toledano, his supporters on the CTM's executive board, and other leftwing unionists and withdrew from both the Confederación de Trabajadores de América Latina, a regional confederation founded by Lombardo Toledano, and the pro-Soviet World Federation of Trade Unions. The CTM subsequently affiliated with the International Confederation of Free Trade Unions.

== Remaking Mexican labor ==
Velázquez and the CTM then proceeded, with the help of the state, to eliminate independent union leaders in industrial unions such as the miners', petroleum workers' and railroad workers' unions. The state exercised its authority to oust uncooperative union leaders, either by removing them directly or manipulating internal union elections.

The new leaders were referred to as charros, or "cowboys", after Jesús Díaz de Leon, the leader imposed on the railroad workers union in 1948, who was known for his fondness for the finery associated with Mexican cowboys. The government likewise coerced the STPRM, the union that represented the workers at PEMEX, the state-run petroleum enterprise, to accept Gustavo Roldán Vargas as its new leader in 1949 and imposed Jesús Carrasco on the Miners and Metal Workers Union (the SNTMMSRM) in 1950.

These heavy-handed efforts did not always go unopposed: when the government installed Carrasco as the head of the SNTMMSRM, a number of locals bolted from the union to form the National Miners Union. When a strike broke out at the Nueva Rosita mine in 1950, the employer prevailed on local businesses to refuse to sell food to the strikers while the government declared martial law in the area, arresting the leaders of the strike, seizing the union's treasury and barring all meetings. The government used similar tactics in 1959, nationalizing the rail industry, firing thousands of strikers and sentencing union leaders to more than ten years in prison for leading a strike. The CTM approved these and other measures to isolate or eliminate independent unions or insurgent movements. By the end of the 1950s most opposition to Velázquez within the CTM had been eliminated.

The CTM did not hold a monopoly on labor organizing or even the exclusive relationship with the PRI: the CROM and other organizations also had a formal relationship with the PRI through its Congreso de Trabajo (CT). The CMT had, however, the advantage of state sponsorship, which it used to oppose any independent unions and to hold down the demands of its constituent unions at the behest of PRI leadership. The CTM adopted a practice of entering into "protection contracts", which would be called "sweetheart contracts" in the United States, which workers not only had no role in negotiating, but in some cases were not even aware existed. Many of these unrepresentative unions degenerated into organizations that "sold" contracts with a CTM affiliate as a guarantee against representation by independent unions, but which did not function as a union in any meaningful sense.

== The age of dinosaurs ==
Those PRI leaders who remained in power acquired the derisive name of "dinosaurs". Velázquez was the longest-lived of them all. He became one of the most conservative as well.

Velázquez and the CTM were opposed to every movement that opposed the status quo: in 1968 he verbally attacked the student demonstrators who supported Cuba and called for democracy in México as radicals inspired by foreign doctrines. The government went further, killing several students in the Tlatelolco massacre that October. Velázquez supported the suppression of the movement.

In 1972 the CT expelled STERM, a union of electrical workers that had demanded union democracy and taken a more militant stance toward employers. When the union did not collapse, the government merged it with another union to form a new organization, the SUTERM. Velázquez intervened in SUTERM's internal affairs to drive out the former leaders of STERM, after which employers blacklisted them and their supporters.

Even then, however, those workers persisted, organizing rallies of more than 100,000 electrical workers and their supporters, and calling a strike at the Federal Electrical Commission (CFE) on July 16, 1976. That strike was ended by army units and thugs who occupied the CFE plants; the army interned hundreds of strikers in San Luis Potosí, while thugs beat workers and forced them to sign letters supporting the charro leadership of the SUTERM.

Velázquez was the first to demand that Cuauhtémoc Cárdenas, who organized the Democratic Current within the PRI in 1987 and went on to found the Partido de la Revolución Democrática (PRD), be expelled from the PRI for arguing for democratization and challenging the entrenched leadership. Velázquez called Cárdenas a violent radical and suggested that he was a Communist. Velázquez was also one of the first to attack the Ejército Zapatista de Liberación Nacional (EZLN) when it led an armed rebellion in Chiapas.

Velázquez was also a faithful supporter of the "technocrats" within the PRI who sought to dismantle the nationalist economic policies of the Mexican Revolution in order to open Mexico further to foreign investment, including Miguel de la Madrid, Carlos Salinas de Gortari, and Ernesto Zedillo Ponce de León. Velázquez continued to support them even as they privatized state-owned industries, a bastion of power for the CTM, as part of the structural adjustment plans imposed by the International Monetary Fund, while signing national pacts that shifted most of the burden to workers while their minimum wage in real terms fell by nearly 70 percent in these years. Velázquez also supported passage of the North American Free Trade Agreement in 1993 after initially denouncing it as a disaster for workers of all three countries.

Even so, Velázquez's power within the PRI slipped in the 1990s as his own health declined. While in the past every President of Mexico conferred with Velázquez before picking a successor, Velázquez was not consulted in the selection of Luis Donaldo Colosio as the PRI's candidate for president in 1994 and was given only a few minutes' notice of the selection of Zedillo to replace Colosio after his assassination.

Velázquez called off the traditional May Day rallies of workers in 1995, threatening those who disobeyed with fines or expulsion, to avoid the possibility of embarrassing displays of opposition to the CTM or the PRI. In lieu of a May Day march in 1996, a group put on a mock funeral for Velázquez.

The real funeral, attended by all of México's political elite, came a year later. Zedillo offered his eulogy for Velázquez: "Don Fidel knew how to reconcile the special interests of workers with the greater interest of the nation".

Velázquez's interim successor, Blas Chumacero, died three weeks after Velázquez at the age of 92. He was succeeded in turn by Leonardo Rodríguez Alcaine, aged 76. A rival federation, the National Union of Workers (UNT), was formed in November 1997 to challenge Velázquez's legacy.

| Preceded by Vicente Lombardo Toledano | Secretary General of the Confederation of Mexican Workers; 1941–1997 | Succeeded by Blas Chumacero |
| Preceded by Gustavo Baz Prada | Belisario Domínguez Medal of Honor; 1979 | Succeeded by Luis Padilla Nervo |
