= National Association of Actors =

Mexican actors guild

The National Association of Actors (Spanish: Asociación Nacional de Actores, ANDA) is the Mexican actors guild. It is a member of the Bloque Latinoamericano de Actores (BLADA, the Latin American Actors' Block) that includes all of the actors' unions in Latin America.

The ANDA is headquartered in the colonia (borough) San Rafael of Mexico City and currently presided by Yolanda Cianí as general secretary.

ANDA began in 1934 as an independent union of actors guilds from throughout Mexico. When Angel T. Sala became its secretary general in 1936, the union was subsumed into the Union of Cinema Studio Workers (Unión de los Trabajadores de Estudio Cinematográficos, UTEC), which was under the control of the CTM, a labor confederation with allegiance to the ruling Institutional Revolutionary Party. The actors, however, continued their struggle for independence and for union democracy.

In 2005, the ANDA had a conflict with Grabaciones y Doblajes Internacionales, which is in charge of the Spanish language-dubbing of the show The Simpsons. The conflict revolved around changing voice actors of the Mexican version of the show. Raymundo Capetillo, Secretary of Work and Conflict promised to defend the cause of the voice actors.

== General Secretaries ==
Some of the most famous General Secretaries of the ANDA are:

- Fernando Soler (1934-1935)
- Mario Moreno Reyes "Cantinflas" (1942-1944)
- Jorge Negrete (1944-1947) (1949-1953)
- Rodolfo Echeverría, brother of President Luis Echeverría
- David Reynoso (1977-1984)
- Ignacio López Tarso (1984-1990)
- Julio Alemán (1990-1994)
- Humberto Elizondo (1994-1998)
- Juan Imperio (1998-2002)(2002-2006)
- Lilia Aragón (2006-2010)
- Silvia Pinal (2010-2014)
- Yolanda Cianí (2014-2018)

== See also ==
- SAG-AFTRA – United States actors guild
- Associación Nacional de Intérpretes (ANDI) – Singers guild of Mexico
