= Authentic Labor Front =

Mexican labor union confederation

FAT
- Frente Auténtico del Trabajo
- Founded: 1960
- Headquarters: Mexico City
- Location: Mexico
- Affiliations: IndustriALL Global Union; Unión Nacional de Trabajadores
- Website: www.fatmexico.org.mx

The Authentic Labor Front (Spanish: Frente Auténtico del Trabajo or FAT) is a confederation of labor unions in Mexico. It was formed as a progressive "Social Catholic" organization in 1960 in response to the nation's labor strife of 1958-1959. Following the strikes of these years, the Mexican government replaced the leaders of the rebellious mine, railroad and oil workers' unions with charros (corrupt labor bosses). The FAT supported union democracy and opposed the authoritarian tendencies of the ruling Institutional Revolutionary Party (PRI). FAT activists have also challenged the mainstream Confederation of Mexican Workers (CTM).

The FAT was influenced by the student movements of the late 1960s and the Tlatelolco Massacre of 1968. In the following years, the FAT's political orientation became more left-wing and secular. It engaged in the rank-and-file union reform campaigns of the 1970s and 1980s that occurred in the steelworkers, auto workers, and electrical workers unions.

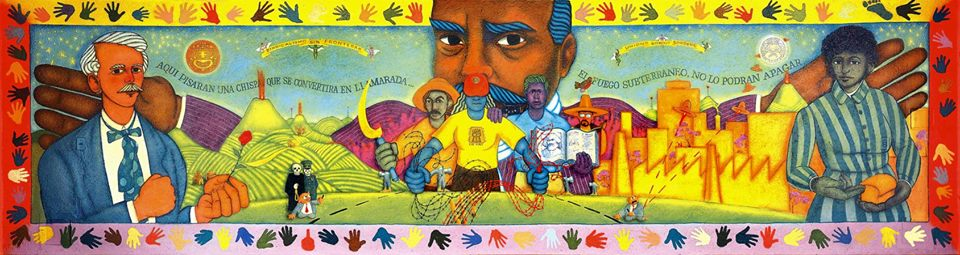
Mural in Mexico City painted to show solidarity between the United Electrical Workers (UE) and FAT. 1997.

Following the implementation of the North American Free Trade Agreement (NAFTA) in 1994, the FAT became one of the main organizations to oppose it. The FAT has participated in international "cross-border solidarity" campaigns with other unions such as the United Electrical Workers of the United States and the United Steelworkers in the United States and Canada. It has also engaged in other social justice initiatives, such as campaigns around women's rights. Though independent from any political party, the FAT tends to side with the center-left National Regeneration Movement (MORENA).
