= Arturo Jáuregui =

Peruvian trade union leader

Arturo Jáuregui Hurtado (20 January 1920 – 4 October 1977) was a Peruvian trade union leader.

Born in Lima, Jáuregui worked in a food factory, and organised a trade union there in 1942. In 1946, he was elected as deputy secretary of the Confederación de Trabajadores del Perú (CTP), and in 1948 as treasurer of the Inter-American Confederation of Workers (CIT). In 1949, he became organising secretary of CIT, and when in 1951 it was replaced by the ICFTU Inter American Regional Organisation of Workers (ORIT), he was elected as its assistant secretary. He was acting general secretary of ORIT from 1955 to 1956, when Luis Alberto Monge was absent.

In 1958, Jáuregui left his ORIT post to focus on the CTP, but he returned as assistant secretary in 1960, then was elected as general secretary in 1961. Many Latin American trade unions regarded him as being overly close to the American AFL-CIO, but the AFL-CIO leadership criticised him as overly political. Despite this, ORIT's affiliated membership grew under his leadership, and he remained in post until 1974.

Trade union offices
Preceded by Alfonso Sánchez Madariaga	General Secretary of the ICFTU Inter American Regional Organisation of Workers; 1961–1974	Succeeded by Julio Etcheverry Espinola
