= CTH =

CTH or cth may refer to:

== Organizations, companies, and schools ==
- CTH Public Company Limited, Thai cable and satellite TV company
- Chalmers University of Technology - Chalmers Tekniska Högskola, in Gothenburg, Sweden
- Honduras Workers' Confederation - Confederación de Trabajadores de Honduras
- China General Aviation Corporation (ICAO airline designator)
- Classical Theatre of Harlem
- Confederation of Tourism and Hospitality - an industry association in the United Kingdom

== Train stations ==
- Chadwell Heath railway station, London (National Rail station code)
- City Hall MRT station, Singapore (MRT station abbreviation)

== Science and mathematics ==
- A programming code for simulation of highly transient shock physics and large deformations such as in Shaped charge explosive devices
- Cystathionine gamma-lyase - an enzyme which converts cystathionine into cysteine encoded by the gene CTH
- Hyperbolic cotangent function, one of the hyperbolic functions in trigonometry

== Other uses ==
- Calum Thomas Hood, Australian musician
- County Trunk Highway, the designation for county highways in the U.S. state of Wisconsin
- Chapo Trap House - an American political and humor podcast
- Commonwealth of Australia, specifically to the federal level of government. Commonly used as a suffix to laws passed by the federal parliament.
- Commonwealth, the traditional English term for a political community founded for the common good
- "Catalogue des Textes Hittites", the main publication and index of the Hittite inscriptions.
