= Confederación Nacional del Trabajo (Colombia) =

Trade union confederation in Colombia

Confederación Nacional del Trabajo ('National Confederation of Labour') was a central trade union confederation in Colombia. CNT was formed in 1953, with support from the military government of General Gustavo Rojas Pinilla. CNT was built up along the lines of the Argentinian peronista unions, and CNT was affiliated to the Agrupación de Trabajadores Latinoamericanos Sindicalistas (ATLAS, which was led by the Peronista unions of Argentina). CNT received financial aid from ATLAS. Moreover, CNT received direct support from the Colombian Ministry of Labour through the minister Aurelio Caicedo Ayerbe. CNT was given access to issue propaganda through public radio stations.

CNT was actively involved in building the political movement constructed to support the rule of Rojas Pinilla, National Action Movement (MAN). CNT and MAN were projected as the constituents of a 'Third Force' in Colombian politics, confronting the two old dominant parties of the country. With a strong anti-oligarchical discourse, Rojas Pinilla sought to utilize CNT and MAN to mobilize popular opinion against the traditional elites and their political parties.

At the same time as the government mobilized support to CNT it curbed the activities of the two main trade union centres of the country, the Liberal Confederación de Trabajadores de Colombia and Conservative Unión de Trabajadores Colombianos. The launching of CNT provoked reactions from the opposition side, and a civic opposition front was formed. By the end of 1955 the pressure from the Roman Catholic Church, the Conservatives and UTC forced the government to close down the CNT.
