= Demetrio Vallejo =

Mexican politician

Demetrio Vallejo (November 7 1910 – December 24, 1985) was a railroad worker and union activist from Tehuantepec, Oaxaca, Mexico. Vallejo began working as a railroad employee in 1928, later joining the Partido Comunista Mexicano (PCM) in 1934. Vallejo was eventually promoted to Regional Director of the PCM in Oaxaca, however later expelled in 1946. In 1946, Vallejo joined the Unified Socialist Action (Spanish: Accion Socialista Unificada) and later the Mexican Worker-Peasant Party (Spanish: Partido Obrero-Campesino Mexicano (POCM) at its founding in 1950. Vallejo was a primary leader of the Mexican railroad strikes of 1958–59.

== Mexican railroad union ==
=== Foundation ===
On June 26, 1958, the Union of Railroad Workers of the Mexican Republic (Spanish: Sindicato de Trabajadores Ferrocarrileros de la Republica Mexicana) (STFRM) Local 13 of Matias Romero, Oaxaca, began a series of escalating strikes, beginning at 2 hours in length, then expanding up to 8 hours, before finally calling a general strike. The STFRM followed Vallejo's call for higher wages, an increase of 350 pesos a month, this became known as "Plan of the Southeast". The strikes were supported by the workers, however failed to gain support of its own union leader, Ortega Hernandez. The strikes began as the demands were not met. On June 26, 1958, the first strike lasted 2 hours and was participated in by almost 60,000 members. The following day on June 27, a 4-hour strike was held, and on June 28, a 6-hour strike. The strike on June 28 was not only of railroad workers, but found the support of petroleum workers, teachers, and students. President Adolfo Ruiz Cortines stepped in before the final steps of strike escalation. Cortines proposed a middle ground between the offer of the railroad, 200 pesos, and the lowered demand by the union of 250 pesos, settling on 215 pesos which was accepted by all parties.

On July 12, 1958, the Sixth Extraordinary General Union Convention met and elected Vallejo to the position of General Secretary or the National Railroad Council. The Secretary of Labor, and the company under which the workers operated, refused to accept Vallejo to the position. The Ministry of Interior demanded the previous leaders be reinstated, effectively overruling the convention vote. In defiance of the ruling, the workers called for a strike on July 31, 1958. The strike lasted 2 hours and was supported by the Electrical Workers Union (SME) and members of the teachers union. The government responded to the strikes, on August 3, 1958, police were sent in to seize the Railroad Workers' union halls and arrest dissident members. The government followed the raids with a proposal to the workers, a bonus and raise if they would return to work. The workers did not accept and on August 6, 1958 the government agreed to hold new elections for the position of General Secretary. Of 100,000 workers who were eligible to vote, about 60,000 cast votes with the final tally as 59,749 votes for Vallejo and 9 votes for the government candidate.

=== General Secretary ===
As General Secretary, Vallejo renounced his salary of 20,000 pesos a month, a sum due to him by law. Vallejo requested the salary be turned over to the railway union treasury. In 1959, workers at Terminal del Valle de Mexico offered to purchase a house for Vallejo, he refused, requesting they instead use the money for a monument to commemorate the struggle of strikes of August 1958, their first victorious strike.

Vallejo went on to present a plan to assist the railroad's financial standing. The plan consisted of raising rates and terminating subsidies given to United States mining and metal companies. It was believed these changes would then permit the railroad to raise wages for its workers and provide better working conditions. The plan was not actioned, and on March 25, 1959, another strike was called. In response President Adolfo López Mateos declared state seizure of the railroad industry. In the following days several workers would be killed as police broke up protests with tear gas and clubs, approximately 10,000 workers fired, and 800 prisoners taken, 150 of those accused of being communist agitators. Historians document the real number of arrested at 3,039 with 2,600 being released, 500 being tried in court. Of those arrested, Vallejo was sentenced to 11 years and 4 months in prison for sedition, in addition to another 5 years for another offense. The government alleged Vallejo was a communist, of which he claims to have left the party in 1946, and that he had plotted the strikes with members of the Soviet embassy in Mexico City, the military attaché and the second secretary, who were later removed from the country.

=== Imprisonment ===
Vallejo's participation did not cease while imprisoned, in 1960 he cast the winning vote to rejoin the POCM with the PCM. In 1968, while still imprisoned in Lecumberri, Vallejo began a hunger strike, students from National Autonomous University of Mexico (UNAM) began their own as a sign of solidarity. In July 1970 Vallejo was released from prison due to the law of social dissolution being repealed by then president Gustavo Díaz Ordaz. Upon release from prison, Vallejo did not rejoin the National Railroad Council, instead he organized his own group, the Railwaymen's Union Movement (MSF) and in 1974, Vallejo co-founded the Mexican Workers' Party (Spanish: Partido Mexicano de los Trabajadores) (PMT).
