= Francisco Aguirre =

Cuban politician and trade unionist

Francisco Aguirre (1910 – 16 August 1967) was a Cuban politician and trade unionist.

Born in Havana, Aguirre spent time working in hospitality in New York City, where he joined the Hotel Employees and Restaurant Employees Union. On his return to Cuba, he joined the Restaurant Workers' Union, rising to become its president. He also joined the Partido Auténtico, for which he was elected to the Congress of Cuba.

In 1945, Aguirre toured the United States with Juan Arévalo, where they discussed founding an anti-communist confederation of Latin American trade unions. He used his post as secretary of the credentials commission of the Workers' Central Union of Cuba (CTC) to exclude communists.

In 1947, Aguirre was appointed as the national Minister of Labour. In this role, he appointed a new leadership of the National Federation of Tobacco Workers, in an attempt to push through mechanisation of the tobacco industry, but was unsuccessful. In 1949, he was appointed as interim general secretary of the CTC, but he lost a subsequent election. Instead, he was appointed as secretary of the Inter-American Confederation of Workers. In 1951, this was replaced by the ICFTU Inter American Regional Organisation of Workers, and he became its first general secretary, but became seen as ineffective and was replaced in 1952.

After the Cuban revolution, Aguirre was imprisoned. His death, of a heart condition, was announced in 1967.

Trade union offices
Preceded by Organisation founded	General Secretary of the ICFTU Inter American Regional Organisation of Workers; 1951–1952	Succeeded by Luis Alberto Monge
