= CLAT =

CLAT may refer to:

- Central Latinoamericana de Trabajadores (CLAT), is the World Confederation of Labour's regional organization for Latin America and the Caribbean
- Common Law Admission Test (CLAT), is a centralised test for admission to National Law Schools in India
- Kurla Terminus (station code=CLAT), now known as Lokmanya Tilak Terminus Mumbai, is a railhead in a suburb of Mumbai, India
- Customer-side transLATor, a technique for network address translation, see 464XLAT
