= Luis Anderson McNeil =

Panamanian politician (born 1941)

Luis Alejandro Anderson McNeil (born February 9, 1941, in Colon, Republic of Panama), was the first Panamanian Secretary General of CIOSL/ORIT Inter-American Regional Organization of Labor (ORIT/ILO). He was also appointed Vice Minister and Minister of Labor in the Republic of Panama in 1984, member of the Board of Directors of the Panama Canal Commission from 1983 to 1989 and member of the Board of Directors of the Panama Canal Authority, the entity that oversees the Panama Canal. He contributed to the labor aspects of the Torrijos-Carter Treaty signed in 1977 between Panama and the United States of America.

== Career ==
Of great stature and recognized experience in Panama and abroad, Luis Anderson, in his capacity as Secretary General of ORIT-CIOSL traveled throughout the five continents in support of democratic trade unionism and international workers in the world. Attended meetings at the World Bank and the International Monetary Fund in Washington, Berlin and Paris. In October 1987 he and his delegation met in Moscow with Prime Minister Mikhail Gorbachev, and in January 1988 he was among members of a group that met with the President of the United States of America, Ronald Reagan, as well as with other Latin American leaders. In the years before his sudden death, he also traveled extensively throughout the American Continent and Europe in his capacity as General Secretary for CIOSL/ORIT and as a lecturer presenting a variety of topics concerning the relationship of European countries with developing countries.

He published numerous articles and booklets on labor unions - the working arena challenges, (including women and children's rights) and social justice in newspapers and magazines in Panama as well as internationally. He received multiple awards and recognitions, among which are the Order of Manuel Amador Guerrero by the Government of the Republic of Panama and the Order of the Great Sun by the Government of Peru.

== Legacy ==
Anderson died from a major stroke in his office at the headquarters of CIOSL/ORIT in Caracas, Venezuela on Saturday November 15, 2003, while preparing for a conference trip the following day. In 2005 CIOSL/ORIT sponsored the publication of a book entitled "A Global Workers Unionist" (a translation of the Spanish title "Un Sindicalista Global"), as a tribute to Anderson who served as their Secretary General for over 25 years. It is a collection of writings and notes on life, work and contributions of Anderson towards social benefit, political and trade union movements in the region. Among the important pieces of writings are those of his friends, political adversaries, family and coworkers. An International Organization based in Panama City, Republic of Panama was created in 2005 to honor and continue his legacy, under the name: LUIS ANDERSON FOUNDATION for Research and Union Development.

Trade union offices
| Preceded by Tulio Cuevas | General Secretary of the ICFTU Inter American Regional Organisation of Workers; 1986–2003 | Succeeded by Víctor Báez |
