= Rafael Camacho Guzmán =

Mexican politician

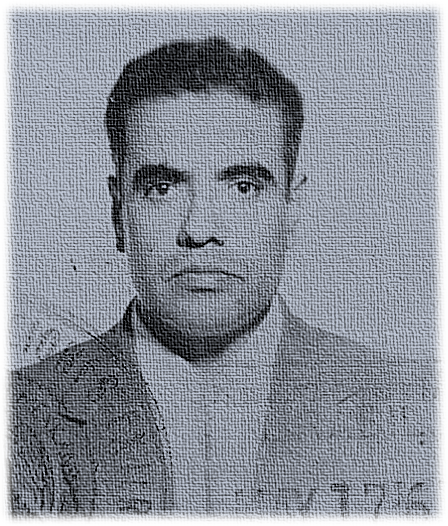
- Rafael Camacho Guzmán
- Born: November 16, 1916; Querétaro, Querétaro, Mexico
- Died: 1998; Mexico City, Mexico
- Occupation: Senator
- Title: Governor of Queretaro
- Political party: PRI

Rafael Camacho Guzmán (November 16, 1916 – 1998) was a Mexican trade union and political leader, member of the Institutional Revolutionary Party and governor of Queretaro from 1979 to 1985.

Rafael Camacho Guzmán was born in the city of Queretaro in 1916. He studied agronomy in Guanajuato. Speaker got his license in 1942 and worked in the XEBZ in Mexico City. It was the official broadcaster of the Presidency of the Republic during the government of Miguel Aleman. He participated in the founding of the Union of the Industry of the Radio and Television (Stirt) and was its director from 1961 to 1979. He was one of the most prominent of the Confederation of Workers of Mexico and very close to Fidel Velazquez leaders. He was elected senator in 1976 and Governor of Queretaro in the 1979 election.

During his administration he held various public works such as the "Corregidora of Queretaro" Stadium, the new auditorium Josefa Ortiz de Domínguez (in the same place where there was an audience with the same name, which was demolished to build the now existing) and network highways of the Sierra Gorda.

== Path ==
He was a Mexican trade union and political leader, member of the Institutional Revolutionary Party and governor of Queretaro from 1979 to 1985. Rafael Camacho Guzmán began his political career as leader of the Industrial Union of Workers and Television and Radio Artists (SITATYR), which placed as one of the most prominent of the Confederation of Workers of Mexico and very close to Fidel Velazquez leaders, this allowed him to occupy various positions of popular election among which are the Senator in 1976 and Governor of Querétaro in 1979. During his administration he held various public works such as the Estadio La Corregidora and highways of the Sierra Gorda.

=== Biographical career ===
He studied agricultural engineering. Announcer since 1942. Co-founder and secretary general of the Union of Industry Radio, Television and Allied of Mexico. (1961-1970). He was a worker delegate from Mexico to the International Labour Organization, secretary of the Labour Congress and president of the Executive Council of the Inter-American Regional Labor Organization. of the board of the National Council of Advertising, senator (1976-1979) and governor of Querétaro (1979-1985).

== Death ==
He died in Mexico City, Federal District, in 1998, at the age of 82 years. His remains rest in the Pantheon of the Colonia Cimatario (Querétaro)

Civic offices
Preceded by Antonio Calzada Urquiza	Governor of Queretaro; October 1, 1979 – September 30, 1985	Succeeded by Mariano Palacios Alcocer
Trade union offices
Preceded by Blas Chumacero	President of the ICFTU Inter American Regional Organisation of Workers; 1974–1977	Succeeded by Alfonso Sánchez Madariaga
