= CTAL =

CTAL is an initialism that may have following meanings:

- Confederación de los Trabajadores de América Latina, a continental trade union federation for Latin America in the mid-1920th century
- International Software Testing Qualifications Board#Certifications (ISTQB Advanced Level), the higher level software tester certification of ISTQB
