= National Union of Mine and Metal Workers of the Mexican Republic =

Trade union

SNTMMSSRM
- National Union of Mine, Metal, Steel and Allied Workers of the Mexican Republic
- Sindicato Nacional de Trabajadores Mineros, Metalúrgicos, Siderúrgicos y Similares de la República Mexicana
- Founded: 1934
- Location: Mexico
- Key people: Napoleón Gómez Urrutia, President and General Secretary
- Affiliations: CTM United Steelworkers, IndustriALL Global Union

The National Union of Mine, Metal, Steel and Allied Workers of the Mexican Republic (Spanish: Sindicato Nacional de Trabajadores Mineros, Metalúrgicos, Siderúrgicos y Similares de la República Mexicana, or SNTMMSSRM) is a union of coal and copper miners, as well as iron and steel workers, in Mexico. It was founded in 1934, and in 1936 it became an affiliate of the newly formed Confederation of Mexican Workers (CTM).

The SNTMMSSRM´s leaders were initially staunch allies of Vicente Lombardo Toledano, the head of the CTM. In 1949, when Lombardo Toledano left the CTM to form the rival General Union of Workers and Campesinos (UGOCM) and the Popular Party, the SNTMMSRM joined these new organizations. The unions of railroad workers (STFRM) and oil workers (STPRM) also supported Lombardo Toledano.

The ruling Institutional Revolutionary Party (PRI) and the CTM saw Lombardo Toledano and these unions as a threat, and in 1950 the government installed charros (corrupt labor bosses) in the leadership of the SNTMMSSRM. The most important of these charros was Napoleón Gómez Sada, who was the president of the SNTMMSSRM for decades until he was replaced by his son in 2001.

The pro-government SNTMMSSRM leaders faced little opposition from the miners' locals (except for Local 65 in Cananea, Sonora). However, a strong reform campaign was initiated in the 1970s and 1980s by steelworkers' locals.

The current leader of the SNTMMSSRM is Napoleón Gómez Urrutia, a disgraced union leader accused of having embezzled US$55 million that was supposed to be used to pay workers' severance payments at the Mexicana de Cananea mining company and that ended up being diverted by Gómez Urrutia, who later fled to Canada to avoid arrest. In April 2021, Gómez Urrutia was sentenced to return the US$55 million. He is currently free from jail thanks to the immunity he benefits from as a senator.
