= Mexican People's Party =

Defunct socialist party in Mexico

The Mexican People's Party (Spanish: Partido del Pueblo Mexicano, abbreviated PPM) was a Marxist, socialist political party in Mexico, founded in 1977. PPM was led by Alejandro Gascón Mercado. PPM was mainly based in the Nayarit and Jalisco states.

Initially called the Mayority Popular Socialist Party, the party was formed after a split in the Popular Socialist Party. The split had emerged in the PPS following the 1975 gubernatorial elections in Nayarit. In 1976 the opponents of the PPS party leadership had formed the 'National Committee to Defend the Popular Socialist Party' in Tepic. The Committee called for the holding of a 'Fifth National Assembly' of the party, which constituted the Mayority Popular Socialist Party as a separate party. The new party claimed to represent the original political line of PPS formulated by Vicente Lombardo Toledano. The group that had formed the trade union centre UGOCM-Roja joined PPM.

In 1977 PPM signed a 'Declaration of Unity' together with the Mexican Communist Party and the Revolutionary Socialist Party. The declaration called for the formation of a united Marxist-Leninist party of the working class in Mexico.

Ahead of the 1979 elections, PPM joined the Left-wing Coalition led by the Mexican Communist Party. Gascón Mercado represented PPM in the Leading Collective of the Coalition. The Coalition obtained 5% of the national vote in the election.

PPM did not obtain official registration as a national political party. It was, however, able to register itself locally in Baja California Sur. In the 1980 elections to the local congress in Baja California Sur, PPM was able to obtain 3.7% of the votes and win one seat through the proportional representation vote.

In 1981 PPM and other left-wing parties merged to form the United Socialist Party of Mexico (PSUM). However, in January 1985 a faction of former PPM members Led by Alejandro Gascón Mercado broke away from PSUM. This group founded the Party of Socialist Revolution.
