= Tulio Cuevas =

Colombian trade unionist

Tulio Enrique Cuevas Romero (19 February 1924 – 19 November 1999) was a Colombian trade unionist.

Born in El Cerrito, Valle del Cauca, Cuevas worked in various industries before becoming a machinist for the Goodyear Tire and Rubber Company. There, he was elected as president of the trade union, but later formed his own union, which led to his dismissal. He later led a strike at Postobón which brought him to national attention. Following this, Gustavo Rojas Pinilla appointed him as the country's worker representative to the International Labour Organization.

Cuevas was elected as vice-president of the Unión de Trabajadores Colombianos (UTC) in 1954, serving until 1956. Although briefly expelled for his willingness to work with Rojas Pinilla, he was readmitted, and in 1963 was elected as president of the UTC. In 1972, he joined the Colombian Conservative Party, and began to focus on trade unionism as a way for workers to participate in politics. He was appointed to the party's national directorate, and in 1974 was elected to the Congress of Colombia.

Cuevas was a leading figure in the 1977 Colombian general strike. He stood down from the UTC in 1982, being named as president emeritus. In 1983, he was elected as general secretary of the ICFTU Inter American Regional Organisation of Workers, retiring in 1986.

Trade union offices
Preceded by Antonio Díaz	President of the Unión de Trabajadores Colombianos; 1963–1982	Succeeded by Victor Acosta
Preceded by Juan J. Del Pino	General Secretary of the ICFTU Inter American Regional Organisation of Workers; 1983–1986	Succeeded by Luis Anderson McNeil
