= Confederación Interamericana de Trabajadores =

International trade union confederation

Mayor Augusto Benavides speaking at the CIT's inauguration ceremony.

Confederación Interamericana de Trabajadores (CIT) was an international trade union confederation, founded in Lima, Peru, in 1948. It was founded on the initiative of the American Federation of Labor (AFL), as an alternative to the communist-led Confederación de los Trabajadores de América Latina (CTAL).

The CIT was formed at a congress in Lima, Peru organized by the Confederación de Trabajadores del Perú (CTP). Approximately 100 delegates representing twelve countries attended. A second congress was held in September 1949 which called on CTAL-affiliated unions to secede from that organization and join it. They also resolved to develop contacts with European and other trade unions in order to found a new world labor organization. In January 1951 the CIT dissolved itself to become the regional affiliate of the International Confederation of Free Trade Unions, ORIT.
