= Permanent Congress of Trade Union Unity of Latin America =

Trade union in Latin American

The Permanent Congress of Trade Union Unity of Latin America also known as the Congreso Permanente de Unidad Sindical de los Trabajadores de América Latina y el Caribe (CPUSTAL) is the Latin American regional organizations of the World Federation of Trade Unions.

== History ==
The origin of the CPUSTAL goes back to a conference held in Santiago, Chile in September 1962 held on the initiative of the Central de Trabajadores de Cuba and the Central Unica de Trabajadores of Chile. At this conference it was decided to set up a co-coordinating committee that would hold a general conference of Latin American trade unions to found a successor to the Confederación de los Trabajadores de América Latina. This congress was held in Brasília, Brazil in 1964 and included delegates from Argentina, Mexico, Peru and Venezuela. The CTAL was dissolved at this congress and a new organization, the Permanent Congress of Trade Union Unity of Latin America was created as its successor.

== Organization ==
The CPUSTAL had trouble finding a permanent headquarters. The Secretariat was originally based in Santiago, but had to leave after the Chilean coup of 1973. They then set up shop in Lima at the invitation of the Confederación General de Trabajadores del Perú. However, they only remained there for about a year, when a shift in the attitudes of the ruling Peruvian junta, forced the secretariat to move once again, this time to Panama City, Panama at the invitation of the Central Nacional de Trabajadores Panamenos. Its address as of 1979 Apartado, Panama 3, Panama.

The organizations Council also had difficulties - in 1967 they were banned by the government of Uruguay forbade from meeting in Montevideo.

CPUSTAL had a subregional body for Central America, the Comité de Unidad Sindical de Centro-America, based in San José, Costa Rica.

== Members ==
As of 1978 the following organizations were affiliated with CPUSTAL:

- Bolivia - Central Obrera Boliviana
- Brazil - "Class trade union movement"
- Chile - Central Unica de Trabajadores (associate)
- Colombia - Confederación Sindical de Trabajadores de Colombia
- Costa Rica - Confederación General de Trabajadores Costaricense
- Cuba - Central de Trabajadores de Cuba
- Dominican Republic - Central General de Trabajadores
- Ecuador - Central de Trabajadores de Ecuador
- El Salvador - Federación Unitaria Sindical Salvedorena
- Guatemala - Federación Autonoma Sindical de Guatemala
- Mexico - Union General de Oberos y Campesinos
- Nicaragua - Confederación General del Trabajo
- Panama - Central Nacional de Trabajadores Panamenos
- Peru - Confederación General de Trabajadores del Perú
- Puerto Rico - Unidad General de Trabajadores
- Uruguay - Confederación Nacional de Trabajadores (associate)
- Venezuela - Central Unitaria de Trabajadores de Venezuela

== Bibliography ==
- Coldrick, A. P. (1979). The international directory of the trade union movement. New York: Facts on File. ISBN 0871963744.
