= Confederación Nacional de Trabajadores (1952) =

Venezuelan trade union

The Movimiento Sindical Independiente de Trabajadores (MOSIT) was a Venezuelan trade union federation, founded at a conference in 1952. At the conference, there were two delegates from each state. Rafael Garcia was the head of MOSIT.

The founding of MOSIT came shortly ahead of the 1952 ILO conference. MOSIT claimed to be apolitical, but in practice the movement was largely supportive of the Marcos Pérez Jiménez government. After MOSIT had been founded, the Venezuelan government appointed MOSIT as the Venezuelan trade union representatives to the ILO conference, a move that was protested by the ICFTU and U.S. unions AFL and CIO.

In 1954 MOSIT changed name to Confederación Nacional de Trabajadores. The organization also joined Agrupación de Trabajadores Latinoamericanos Sindicalistas.

After the fall of Pérez Jiménez in 1958, CNT and most of its affiliated unions were dissolved.
