= Popular Socialist Party (Mexico) =

Political party in Mexico

Popular Socialist Party Partido Popular Socialista
- Abbreviation: PPS
- Leader: Manuel Fernández Flores
- Founded: 1948
- Registered: 1948–1997
- Split from: Institutional Revolutionary Party
- Headquarters: Av. Álvaro Obregón 182 Col. Roma Delegación Cuauhtémoc. México D.F.
- Ideology: Communism; Marxism; Socialism; Lombardism; Marxism-Leninism (From 1960)
- Political position: Left-wing
- International affiliation: IMCWP

Website
- partidopopularsocialista.org.mx

A PPS poster from 1978, celebrating the 40th anniversary of the nationalization of Mexico's oil industry. The slogan reads, "To Nationalize is to De-colonize".

The Popular Socialist Party (Spanish: Partido Popular Socialista, PPS) is an unregistered political party in Mexico. It was founded in 1948 as the Popular Party (Partido Popular) by Vicente Lombardo Toledano.

Lombardo Toledano, the initial leader of the Confederation of Mexican Workers (CTM), decided to launch a new party in response to the increasingly moderate and corrupt policies of the ruling Institutional Revolutionary Party (PRI). The Popular Party was supported by the mine, oil and rail workers' unions, but its potential strength in elections was reduced by the strength of the PRI.

The party adopted Marxism-Leninism as its ideological line in 1960.

It was renamed the Popular Socialist Party in 1960, and over time its leadership became less critical of the PRI; indeed, in all presidential elections between 1958 and 1982 the PPS supported the PRI candidates, and therefore it was often criticized as being a "loyal opposition" or part of the status quo. Due to this, it was popularly known by many Mexicans as the Ni, ni, ni party, as in "Ni partido, ni popular, ni socialista" (Neither a party, nor popular, nor socialist).

While allied with the PRI at the federal level, the PPS represented a serious opposition to the PRI at the local level in the state of Nayarit during the 70s; there, the PPS candidate Alejandro Gascón Mercado won the mayoral race in the state capital, Tepic, in 1972. Three years later, the PPS nominated the aforementioned Gascón Mercado as its candidate for the governorship of Nayarit in the 1975 state election. Back then, the PRI still governed all Mexican states and it was considered "unthinkable" that it would relinquish a state governorship to the opposition, but Gascón Mercado's candidacy attracted the support of wide sectors of the Nayarit electorate, to the surprise of the PRI bosses. On election day, 9 November 1975, the army guarded many polling stations under the pretext of "guaranteeing order", and the official results declared the PRI candidate, Rogelio Flores Curiel, as the winner with 69 762 votes against 44 152 votes for Gascón Mercado. Gascón Mercado and the local membership of the PPS protested the results, accusing the PRI of electoral fraud and demanded that the election be nullified. Days after the election, President Luis Echeverría, PRI President Porfirio Muñoz Ledo and PPS Secretary General Jorge Cruickshank García met to discuss the situation in Nayarit. Shortly after, Cruickshank García was nominated candidate for Senator for the state of Oaxaca by the PPS in coalition with the PRI for next year's general election, which would be the first -and only- time that the PRI supported a Senatorial candidacy of someone who did not belong to the PRI; it was widely speculated that Cruisckshank was offered the Senatorship in exchange for the PPS conceding defeat in Nayarit. Angered by this, Gascón Mercado left the PPS and founded the Mexican People's Party (Partido del Pueblo Mexicano, PPM), which later merged with the Mexican Communist Party to form the Unified Socialist Party of Mexico (PSUM).

The party broke with the PRI at the federal level for the first time in the 1988 presidential election, choosing instead to support the candidacy of Cuauhtémoc Cárdenas and entering his National Democratic Front. In the 1994 election, the party nominated Marcela Lombardo Otero, the daughter of party founder Vicente Lombardo, as its presidential candidate; she would only obtain 0.47% of the votes. This result (second to last among nine presidential candidates) implied the loss of the official registry to her party, which was recovered in 1997, and then lost again definitely after the midterm elections of that year.

In 1997, a second party with nearly the same name—the Popular Socialist Party of Mexico or PPSM—split off from the older PPS. This splinter group claims to be the true descendant of Lombardo Toledano's party.

The PPS's traditional political space (i.e. to the left of the PRI) was largely captured by the Party of the Democratic Revolution (PRD) since 1989. The PPS lost its registration as a national political party in 1997, though it is currently registered as a national political association under the name Popular Socialista.

== PPS presidents ==
1. Vicente Lombardo Toledano (1948–1968)
2. Jorge Cruickshank García (1968–1989)
3. Indalecio Sáyago Herrera (1989–1997)
4. Manuel Fernández Flores (since 1997)

== PPS candidates ==
1. Vicente Lombardo Toledano (1952)
2. Adolfo López Mateos (allied with PRI and PARM; 1958)
3. Gustavo Díaz Ordaz (allied with PRI and PARM; 1964)
4. Luis Echeverría Álvarez (allied with PRI and PARM; 1970)
5. José López Portillo (allied with PRI and PARM; 1976)
6. Miguel de la Madrid (allied with PRI and PARM; 1982)
7. Cuauhtémoc Cárdenas Solórzano (allied with PARM, PFCRN, and PMS to form National Democratic Front; 1988)
8. Marcela Lombardo Otero (1994)
