= Víctor Báez =

Paraguayan trade union leader

Víctor Báez Mosqueira (born 29 May 1956) is a Paraguayan trade union leader.

== Life and career ==
Born in Asunción, Báez was a founding member of the Trade Union of Bank Employees in the 1970s, serving as its general secretary from 1977 until 1986.

In 1983, Báez was elected as the auditor of the ICFTU Inter American Regional Organisation of Workers (ORIT), and in 1985 he additionally became general secretary of the Paraguayan Inter-Union Movement (MIT). With democratisation in Paraguay, the MIT became the Central Unitaria de Trabajadores, and Báez served as its president from 1989 until 1993. He was also a founding member of the Southern Cone Trade Union Coordinating Body.

Báez was elected in the 1991 Paraguayan Constitutional Assembly election. Within ORIT, he rose to become Secretary of Economic and Social Policies, and then general secretary. In 2008 ORIT merged into the Trade Union Confederation of the Americas, and Báez continued as general secretary. In 2018, he moved to become a Deputy General Secretary of the International Trade Union Confederation.

Trade union offices
Preceded by Luis Anderson McNeil	General Secretary of the ICFTU Inter American Regional Organisation of Workers; 2003–2008	Succeeded by Federation merged
Preceded by New position	General Secretary of the Trade Union Confederation of the Americas; 2008–2018	Succeeded by Rafael Freire Neto
