= Unified Socialist Party of Mexico =

Defunct political party in Mexico

Unified Socialist Party of Mexico Partido Socialista Unificado de México
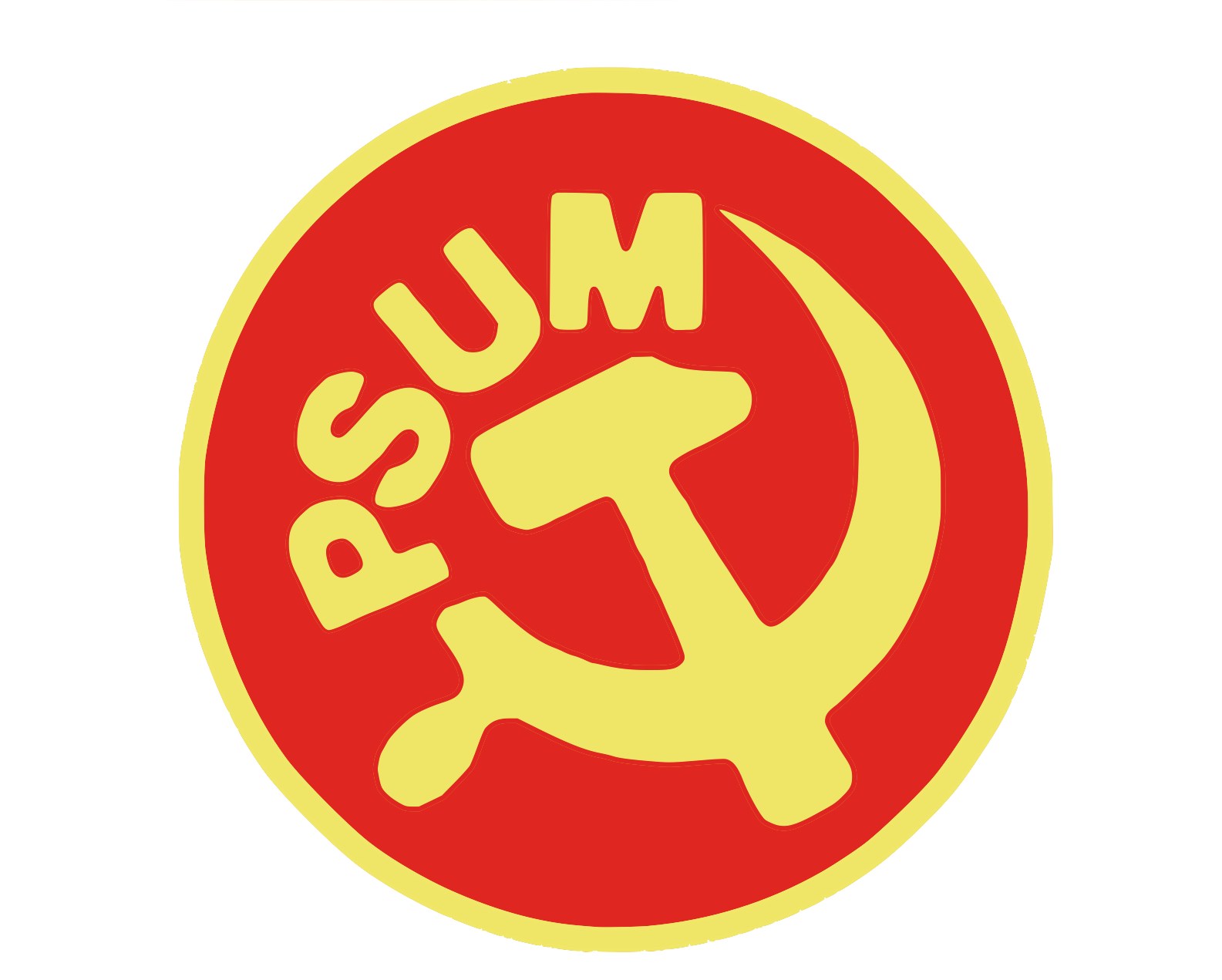
- Founded: 18 December 1981
- Dissolved: 1987
- Merger of: PCM; PPM
- Merged into: Mexican Socialist Party
- Ideology: Communism; Marxism; Anti-imperialism; Multi-tendency
- Political position: Far-left

The Unified Socialist Party of Mexico (Spanish: Partido Socialista Unificado de México, PSUM) was a socialist political party in Mexico. It later became the Mexican Socialist Party (Partido Mexicano Socialista) in 1988.

== History ==
The PSUM was founded in November 1981 by the merger of four socialist parties:

- The Mexican Communist Party (Partido Comunista Mexicano, PCM) - the Mexican affiliate of the Communist International, formed in 1919;
- The Movement of Socialist Action and Unity (Movimiento de Acción y Unidad Socialista, MAUS) - a split from the PCM that was active in the Mexican Labour movement;
- The Party of the Mexican People (Partido del Pueblo Mexicano, PPM) - a split from the Popular Socialist Party (PPS);
- The Movement of Popular Action (Movimiento de Acción Popular, MAP) - a party involved in campaigns for trade-union democracy and reform in the 1970s.

Before merging to form the PSUM, these four parties had formed an electoral alliance called the Coalition of the Left (Coalición de Izquierda) in 1977.

Though the PSUM was a multi-tendency organization, it generally followed the ideology of Eurocommunism. In 1988, the PSUM changed its name to the Mexican Socialist Party (Partido Mexicano Socialista, PMS) after the merging with Mexican Workers' Party. In 1989, following the presidential campaign of Cuauhtémoc Cárdenas, the PMS joined Cárdenas and other dissidents from the Institutional Revolutionary Party to form the Party of the Democratic Revolution (PRD).
