= Blas Chumacero =

Mexican politician

President of the Chamber of Deputies
- In office 1 November 1985 – 30 November 1985
- Preceded by: Beatriz Elena Paredes Rangel
- Succeeded by: Fernando Ortíz Arana
- In office 1 November 1940 – 30 November 1940
- Preceded by: Ernesto Gallardo Sánchez
- Succeeded by: Jesús U. Molina

President of the Senate
- In office 1 December 1981 – 31 August 1982
- Preceded by: Ángel Ventura Valle
- Succeeded by: Miguel González Avelar

Senator for Puebla
- In office 1 September 1988 – 31 October 1994
- Preceded by: Alfonso Zegbe Sanen
- Succeeded by: Melquiades Morales
- In office 1 September 1976 – 31 August 1982
- Preceded by: Guadalupe López Bretón
- Succeeded by: Ángel Aceves Saucedo

Member of the Chamber of Deputies for Puebla's 1st district
- In office 1 September 1985 – 31 August 1988
- Preceded by: Hilda Luisa Valdemar Lima
- Succeeded by: Víctor M. Carreto y Fernández de Lara
- In office 1 September 1967 – 31 August 1970
- Preceded by: Melquíades Trejo Hernández
- Succeeded by: Miguel López González
- In office 1 September 1958 – 31 August 1961
- Preceded by: Salvador Lobato Jiménez
- Succeeded by: Francisco Márquez Ramos
- In office 1 September 1952 – 31 August 1955
- Preceded by: Francisco Márquez Ramos
- Succeeded by: Salvador Lobato Jiménez
- In office 1 September 1946 – 31 August 1949
- Preceded by: Gustavo Díaz Ordaz
- Succeeded by: Francisco Márquez Ramos
- In office 1 September 1940 – 31 August 1943
- Preceded by: Juan Salamanca V.
- Succeeded by: Gustavo Díaz Ordaz

Personal details
- Born: 18 January 1905 Puebla, Puebla, Mexico
- Died: 12 July 1997 (aged 92) Mexico City, D.F., Mexico
- Party: PRI
- Occupation: Politician

Blas Chumacero Sánchez (18 January 1905 – 12 July 1997) was a Mexican trade union leader and politician. He served as interim general secretary of the Confederation of Mexican Workers (CTM) after Fidel Velásquez's death in 1997.

Born in the city of Puebla, Chumacero Sánchez was the son of Zenón Chumacero Bueno and Josefa Sánchez Serrano. A high school dropout textile worker, he became a founding member of the General Confederation of Workers and Farmers of Mexico (CGOCM) in 1920 and a founding member of the Institutional Revolutionary Party's forerunner, the National Revolutionary Party (PNR). In 1936 he became a founding delegate of the Confederation of Mexican Workers (CTM) and three years later he founded the Workers' Federation of Puebla, in which he served as general secretary for over 45 years.

Because of the strong (and usually coercive) ties between the Mexican labor movement and the Institutional Revolutionary Party during most of the 20th century, Chumacero was elected once to the Congress of Puebla, six times to the Chamber of Deputies and twice to the Senate, for a total of 33 years serving as legislator.

He was married to Aurelia Corona and adopted two siblings: Jaime and Rebeca Chumacero Lucio.

Trade union offices
Preceded by Alfonso Sánchez Madariaga	President of the ICFTU Inter American Regional Organisation of Workers; 1970–1974	Succeeded by Rafael Camacho Guzmán
Preceded by Fidel Velázquez Sánchez	General Secretary of the Confederation of Mexican Workers; 1997	Succeeded by Leonardo Rodríguez Alcaine
