= ICFTU Inter American Regional Organisation of Workers =

- Organización Regional Interamericana de Trabajadores
- Merged into: Trade Union Confederation of the Americas
- Founded: 1951
- Dissolved: March 2008
- Headquarters: São Paulo, Brazil
- Location: The Americas
- Members: 50 million in 29 countries
- Affiliations: ICFTU
- Website: www.cioslorit.org

The ICFTU Inter American Regional Organisation of Workers (Spanish: Organización Regional Interamericana de Trabajadores, ORIT) was the regional organization of the International Confederation of Free Trade Unions (ICFTU) for the Americas.

The federation was formed in 1951, and described its objective as being to work for independent, autonomous, democratic unions throughout the Americas. The ICFTU merged with the World Confederation of Labor in 2006, and in 2008, ORIT merged with the WCL's former regional organisation for the Americas, the Latin American Confederation of Workers, to form the Trade Union Confederation of the Americas.

As of 2005, the organization had 65 affiliated or fraternal organizations, in 29 countries, representing 50 million workers.

== Member TUCs ==
The following national organizations were affiliated with ORIT in 2005:

- Argentina
  - Confederación General del Trabajo de la República Argentina
- Barbados
  - Barbados Workers' Union
- Belize
  - National Trade Union Congress of Belize (Fraternal, not affiliated)
- Brazil
  - Central Única dos Trabalhadores
  - Confederação Geral dos Trabalhadores
- Canada
  - Canadian Labour Congress
  - Confédération des syndicats nationaux
- Chile
  - Central Unitaria de Trabajadores
- Colombia
  - Confederación de Trabajadores de Colombia
  - Central Unitaria de Trabajadores de Colombia (Frat.)
- Costa Rica
  - Confederación de Trabajadores Rerum Novarum
- Dominica
  - Waterfront and Allied Workers' Union
- Dominican Republic
  - Confederación Nacional de Trabajadores Dominicana
  - Confederación de Trabajadores Unitaria
- Ecuador
  - Confederación Ecuatoriana de Organizaciones
- El Salvador
  - Central de Trabajadores Democráticos
  - Unión Nacional de Trabajadores Campesinos (Frat.)
- Guatemala
  - Confederación de Unidad Sindical de Guatemala
  - Unidad Sindical de Trabajadores de Guatemala (Frat.)
- Central de Trabajadores del Campo (Frat.)
- Guyana
  - Guyana Trades Union Congress
- Honduras
  - Confederación de Trabajadores de Honduras
  - Confederación Unica de Trabajadores de Honduras
- Jamaica
  - Jamaica Confederation of Trade Unions
- Mexico
  - Confederación de Trabajadores de México
  - Unión Nacional de Trabajadores
- Montserrat
  - Montserrat Allied Workers' Union
- Nicaragua
  - Confederación de Unificación Sindical
  - Central Sandinista de Trabajadores
- Panama
  - Confederación de Trabajadores de la República de Panamá
  - Convergencia Sindical
- Paraguay
  - Central Unica de Trabajadores
- Peru
  - Confederación Gral de Trabajadores del Perú
  - Confederación Unitaria de Trabajadores del Perú
- Suriname
  - Algemeen Verbond van Vakverenigingen de Moederbond (Frat.)
- Trinidad and Tobago
  - National Trade Union Centre of Trinidad and Tobago
- United States
  - AFL-CIO
- Uruguay
  - Asociación de Bancarios del Uruguay
- Venezuela
  - Confederación Trabajadores de Venezuela

== Criticism ==
In June 2006 an American labor magazine, Labor Notes, documented the role that the ORIT, ICFTU, ILO, and the AFL-CIO played in supporting elements opposed to the government of Haitian leader Aristide. ORIT is alleged to have ignored massive labor persecution against public sector workers and trade unionist supporters of the ousted government throughout 2004, 2005, and 2006.

== Leadership ==
=== General Secretaries ===
1951: Francisco Aguirre
1952: Luis Alberto Monge
1958: Alfonso Sánchez Madariaga
1961: Arturo Jáuregui
1974: Julio Etcheverry Espinola
1977: Juan Del Pino
1983: Tulio Cuevas
1986: Luis Anderson McNeil
2003: Víctor Báez

=== Presidents ===
1951: Arturo Sabroso Montoya
1952: Luis Alberto Colotuzzo
1955: Ignacio Gonzalez Tellechea
1961: Alfonso Sánchez Madariaga
1970: Blas Chumacero
1974: Rafael Camacho Guzmán
1977: Alfonso Sánchez Madariaga
1997: Dick Martin
2001: Linda Chavez-Thompson
