= Fred Redmond =

American steelworker and labor activist

Frederick D. Redmond is an American labor union official.

Born in Chicago, Redmond began working at the Reynolds Metal Company in 1973. He soon joined the United Steelworkers (USW), becoming president of its Local 3911. In 1998, he began working for the union, then in 2006, he was elected as its international vice president for human affairs, with responsibilities including representing healthcare workers.

In 2007, Redmond was additionally elected as chair of the board of directors of the A. Philip Randolph Institute, and in 2021, he became president of the Trade Union Confederation of the Americas. In 2022, he stood down from his USW post, to become secretary-treasurer of the AFL-CIO, the second-highest post in the organisation. This made him the highest-ranking Black officer ever in the labor movement in the United States.

Trade union offices
| Preceded by Hassan Yussuff | President of the Trade Union Confederation of the Americas; 2021–present | Succeeded by Incumbent |
| Preceded by Liz Shuler | Secretary-Treasurer of the AFL-CIO; 2022–present | Succeeded by Incumbent |
