= Luis Colotuzzo =

Uruguayan trade unionist

Luis Alberto Colotuzzo Risso (13 December 1917 – 5 June 2014) was a Uruguayan trade unionist.

Born in Alejandro Gallinal, Colotuzzo moved to Montevideo at an early age, finding work in a ceramics factory. There, he joined the Independent Bricklayers' Union. He soon rose to prominence in the movement, serving as an advisor to the Uruguayan government at the 1950 conference of the Organization of American States, then in 1951 becoming the founding president of the Uruguayan Trade Union Confederation.

In 1952, he was elected as president of the ICFTU Inter American Regional Organisation of Workers, serving until its following congress, in 1955. In 1986, he became active in the pensioners' movement, supporting the successful November 1989 Uruguayan constitutional referendum for increases in state pensions, and from 1991 to 1999 representing pensioners on the board of the Banco de Previsión Social.

Trade union offices
Preceded by Arturo Sabroso Montoya	President of the ICFTU Inter American Regional Organisation of Workers; 1952–1955	Succeeded by Ignacio Gonzalez Tellechea
