= Arturo Sabroso Montoya =

Peruvian trade union leader and politician

Arturo Sabroso Montoya (24 September 1895 – 7 March 1974) was a Peruvian trade union leader and politician.

Born in Lima, Sabroso Montoya worked in the textile industry. In the late 1910s, he was a prominent member of the Committee for the Eight-hour Workday. He later founded the Federation of Textile Workers of Peru and became editor of the newspaper El Obrero Textil. He was also a founding member of the Peruvian Aprista Party and was elected to the Chamber of Deputies.

In 1934, Sabroso Montoya was imprisoned on El Frontón. While there, he wrote an open letter denouncing mistreatment and torture. He was released in 1938. In 1944, he became general secretary of the Confederación General de Trabajadores del Perú. In 1951, he became the founding president of the ICFTU Inter American Regional Organisation of Workers, serving for a single year. He also served on the general council of the International Confederation of Free Trade Unions.

Trade union offices
Preceded by Organisation founded	President of the ICFTU Inter American Regional Organisation of Workers; 1951–1952	Succeeded by Luis Colotuzzo
