= Leonardo Rodríguez Alcaine =

Mexican politician

Leonardo Rodríguez Alcaine (May 1, 1919 – August 6, 2005) was a Mexican trade union leader and a long-serving legislator of the Institutional Revolutionary Party. He presided over the Confederation of Mexican Workers (CTM) from July 21, 1997, until his death at the age of 86.

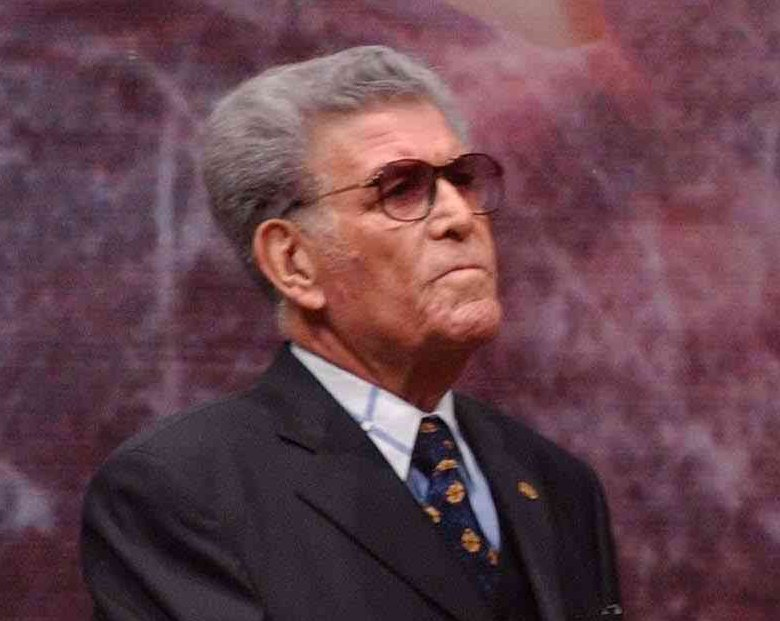
Leonardo Rodríguez Alcaine

Born in Texcoco, state of México, Rodríguez Alcaine was the oldest son of José Rodríguez Ibáñez and Florencia Alcaine. For two years he attended the National Polytechnic Institute before dropping out and enrolling at a customs officer's academy.

At the age of 19 he joined the Federal Electricity Commission (a government-owned electricity monopoly) and got involved in the SUTERM, an electricians trade union with strong links to the government endorsed Institutional Revolutionary Party (PRI). He climbed through the ranks and served 24 years as a PRI legislator (two terms in the Senate and four in the Chamber of Deputies).

On July 21, 1997, almost a month after his predecessor's death, Rodríguez Alcaine was elected president of the Workers' Confederation of Mexico (in Spanish: Confederación de Trabajadores de México, CTM), the largest confederation of labor unions in the country. He was confirmed in the post by a general assembly on March 8, 1998, and re-elected in February 2004.

A day before his death, visibly weakened, he publicly endorsed Roberto Madrazo as the CTM candidate of choice for the 2006 presidential election. He died on August 6, 2005, from heart problems at a private clinic in Mexico City.

Preceded by Blas Chumacero	Secretary General of the Confederation of Mexican Workers; 1997–2005	Succeeded by Joaquín Gamboa Pascoe
