= Dick Martin (trade unionist) =

Richard Allan "Dick" Martin (1944 – October 2001) was a Canadian trade unionist.

Born in southern Ontario, Martin worked as an electrician, and in 1968 began working for INCO in Thompson, Manitoba. He joined the United Steelworkers, and won election as president of his union local. In 1978, he was elected as president of the Manitoba Federation of Labour. He used the post to launch an occupational health clinic, the first of its kind in Canada. He also founded the Manitoba Labour Education Centre, and served on the University of Manitoba Board of Governors.

In 1984, Martin was elected as executive vice president of the Canadian Labour Congress (CLC), in which role he supported the new National Day of Mourning for workers killed while on the job. In 1992, he became secretary-treasurer of the congress. From 1997, he also served as president of the ICFTU Inter American Regional Organisation of Workers.

Martin retired from the CLC in 1999. He was awarded the Order of Manitoba in 2001, and died in October that year.

Trade union offices
Preceded by Shirley Carr	Executive Vice President of the Canadian Labour Congress; 1984–1992	Succeeded by Jean-Claude Parrot
Preceded by Richard Mercier	Secretary-Treasurer of the Canadian Labour Congress; 1992–1999	Succeeded by Nancy Riche
Preceded by Alfonso Sánchez Madariaga	President of the ICFTU Inter American Regional Organisation of Workers; 1997–2001	Succeeded by Linda Chavez-Thompson
