= Confederation of Mexican Workers =

Labor union association

- Confederación de Trabajadores de México

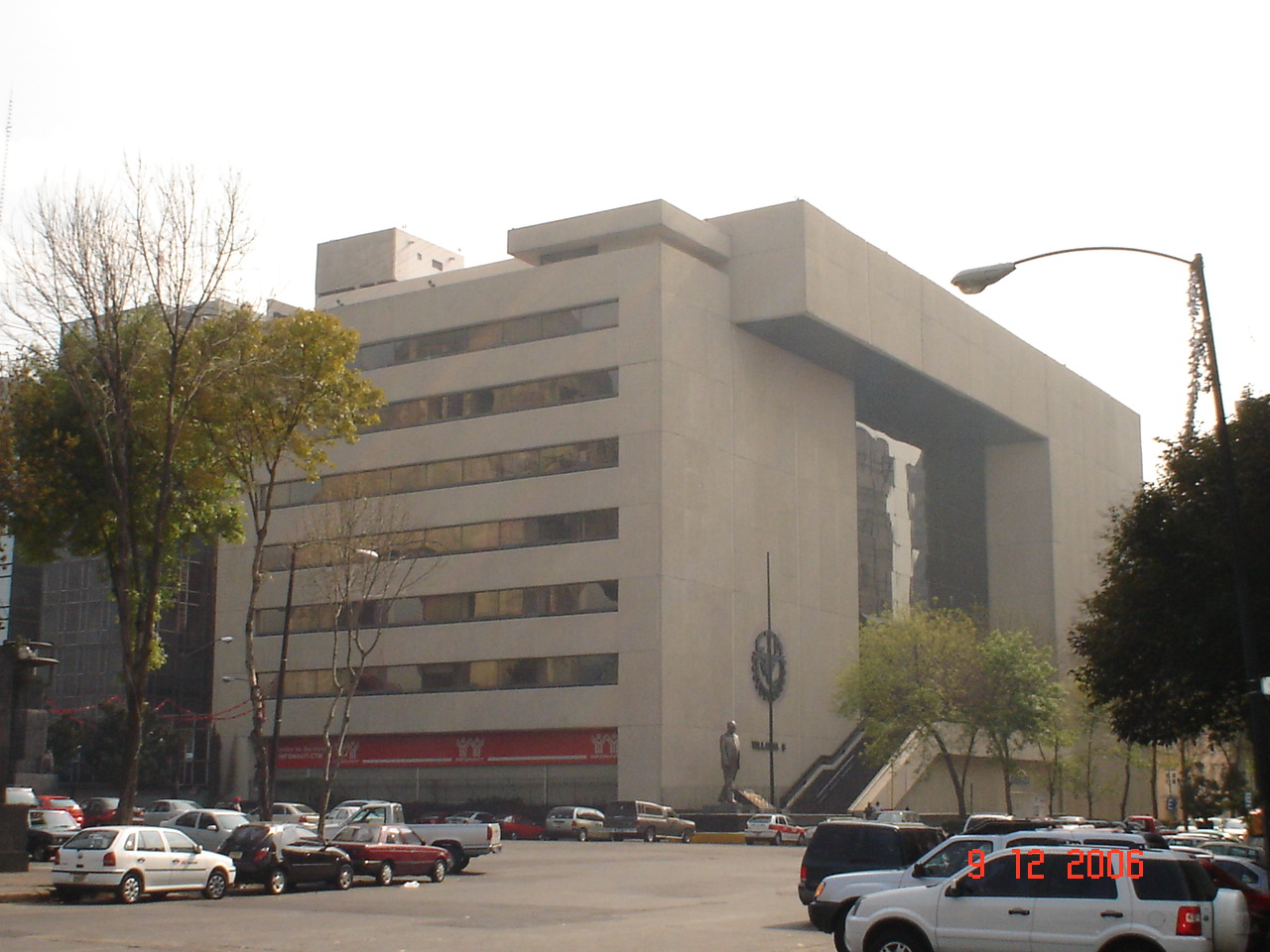
- Founded: February 21, 1936
- Headquarters: México D.F.
- Location: Mexico
- Members: 4,500,000
- Key people: Tereso Medina Ramírez Secretary General (2026 – present)
- Affiliations: ORIT
- Website: ctmoficial.org

The Confederation of Mexican Workers (Confederación de Trabajadores de México [CTM]) is the largest confederation of labor unions in Mexico. For many years, it was one of the essential pillars of the Partido Revolucionario Institucional (the Institutional Revolutionary Party, or PRI), which ruled Mexico for more than seventy years. However, the CTM began to lose influence within the PRI structure in the late 1980s, as technocrats increasingly held power within the party. Eventually, the union found itself forced to deal with a new party in power after the PRI lost the 2000 general election, an event that drastically reduced the CTM's influence in Mexican politics.

== Founding the CTM ==
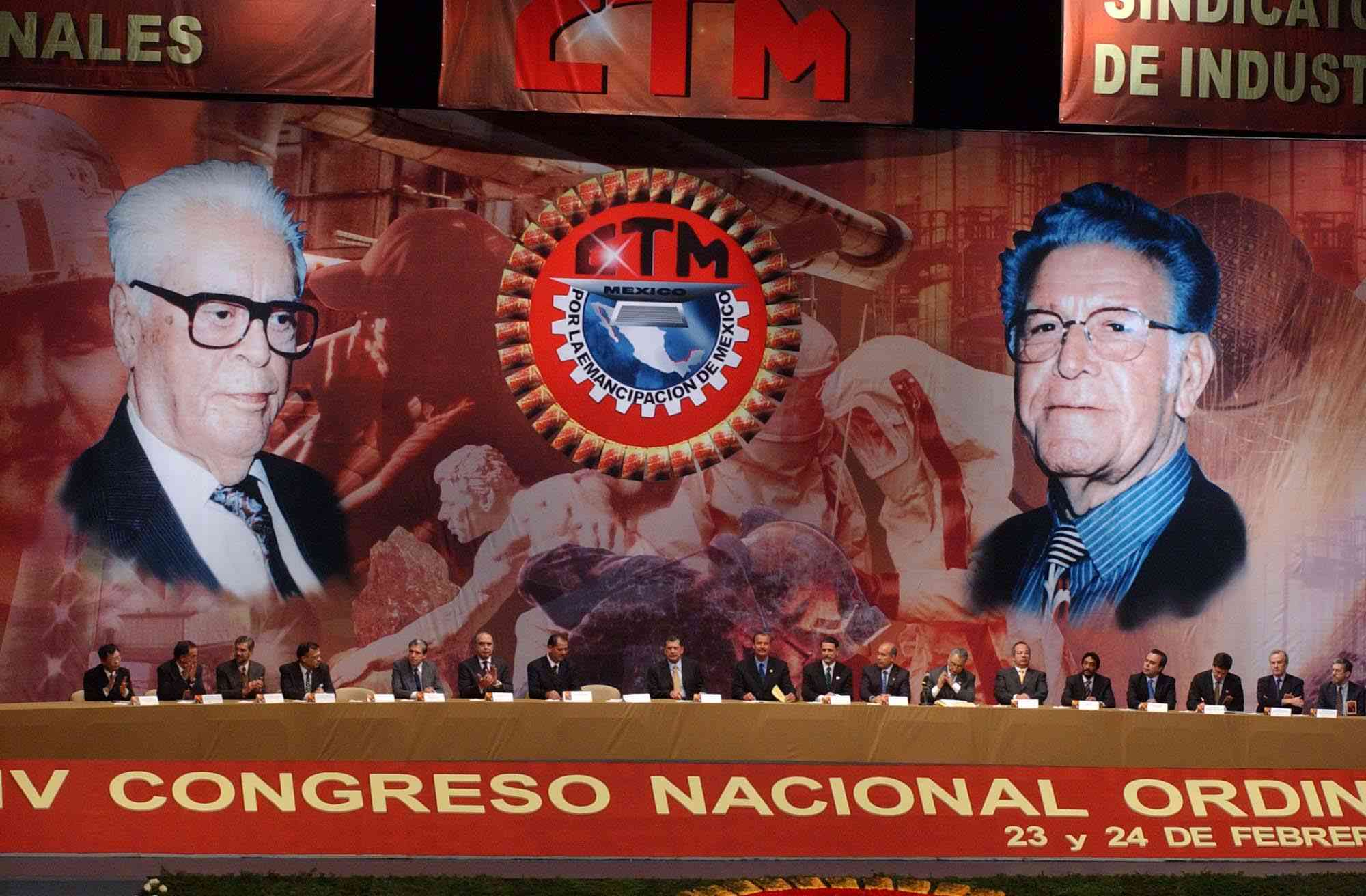
CTM's 14th National Congress

The CTM was founded on February 21, 1936, during the term of President Lázaro Cárdenas del Río. Cárdenas's predecessors had relied heavily on the Confederación Regional Obrera Mexicana, or CROM, in order to garner support from the working class. However, this support was withdrawn after the assassination of President Álvaro Obregón in 1928. Once this happened the CROM began to fragment as unions and their leaders defected from the organization. Cárdenas saw an organized labor sector as being essential to the goals of his government and pushed for the formation of a new umbrella labor organization.

One of the most important leaders who left CROM was Vicente Lombardo Toledano, a Marxist intellectual who later developed close ties with the Soviet Union. Lombardo Toledano formed his own federation of disaffected CROM members, which he called the "Purified CROM".

He later formed an alliance with Fidel Velázquez Sánchez, the leader of the Confederación Sindical de Trabajadores del Distrito Federal (CSTDF), and with the leaders of the Confederación General de Trabajadores (CGT). Once these alliances were consolidated they founded the Confederación General de Obreros y Campesinos de México (CGOCM) on June 28, 1933.

The CGOCM became the most important union body in México, leading a number of strikes in 1934. The CGOCM and the Mexican Communist Party (PCM) rallied to support President Cárdenas when he called on unions for support in resisting a threat of coup by former president Plutarco Elías Calles, and in opposing an employers' strike in Monterrey. Cárdenas also called on the CGT and the CSTDF unions to form a single unified body. The CGOCM then transformed itself into the Confederación de Trabajadores de México in response.

The CTM almost disintegrated at the moment of its formation, however. While Lombardo Toledano was a convinced Stalinist and the most important representative of the Soviet Union in México and Latin America, after his visit there in 1935, he was never a member of the Mexican Communist Party or PCM. At the founding convention of the CTM, the PCM and its industrial unions had been promised the second most powerful position within the CTM secretariat. However, when Lombardo Toledano granted that position to Fidel Velázquez, the leftist unions walked out of the convention. They returned under pressure with the excuse of preserving unity and grudgingly assented to Velázquez's election.

== Integration in the PRM ==
The PCM and its unions almost walked out of the CTM a second time in 1937. They returned at the urging of Earl Browder, then head of the Communist Party USA, to accept "unity at all costs". The CTM (along with the CROM and the electrical workers union) formally aligned with the Partido Revolucionario Mexicano (PRM), the predecessor of the PRI, as its "labor sector" in 1938.

As a part of the party in government and therefore effectively part of the state, the CTM received a number of benefits. The Federal Labor Board, which determined which unions could represent workers and whether strikes were legal, consistently favored the CTM against its rivals. Over time, the CTM also became dependent on the PRM and the State for financial support: the PRM provided CTM with subsidies, while the CTM in return required workers to join the union recognized at their workplace and, by extension, the PRM. The PRM also provided CTM leaders with positions at all levels of government and guaranteed at least one seat in the Mexican Senate for a CTM leader.

During his tenure President Cárdenas took steps to ensure that CTM did not acquire enough power as to be able to become independent of the party. He prohibited the CTM from representing federal civil servants, creating a separate union for them, and also barred the CTM from admitting farmers into its ranks.

== Change in leadership ==
1947 May Day poster of CTM, Author : Pablo O'Higgins, Taller de Gráfica Popular

Consistent with the Mexican tradition against re-election of leaders, Lombardo Toledano stepped down as general secretary of the CTM at the end of his term. Fidel Velázquez, who in the meantime had built up an extensive political support base as a member of the secretariat, replaced him on February 28, 1941.

In 1946, the CTM joined in forming the newly formed PRI, the successor party of the PRM, becoming once again one of its constituent parts. As the formal division between the PRI and the state was blurred, the boundaries between the CTM and the party and the state likewise became harder to distinguish.

Lombardo Toledano had remained active in the CTM after Fidel Velázquez replaced him. That changed, however, after Lombardo Toledano broke with the PRI in 1947 to form the Partido Popular. The CTM not only refused to endorse the new party but also expelled Lombardo Toledano, his supporters on the CTM's board, and other left-wing unionists. The leadership of the CTM also adjusted its foreign policy to conform to that of President Miguel Alemán and withdrew from both the Confederación de Trabajadores de América Latina (a regional organization founded by Lombardo Toledano) and the pro-Soviet World Federation of Trade Unions. The CTM subsequently affiliated with the International Confederation of Free Trade Unions, which later became the International Trade Union Confederation.

== Remaking Mexican labor ==
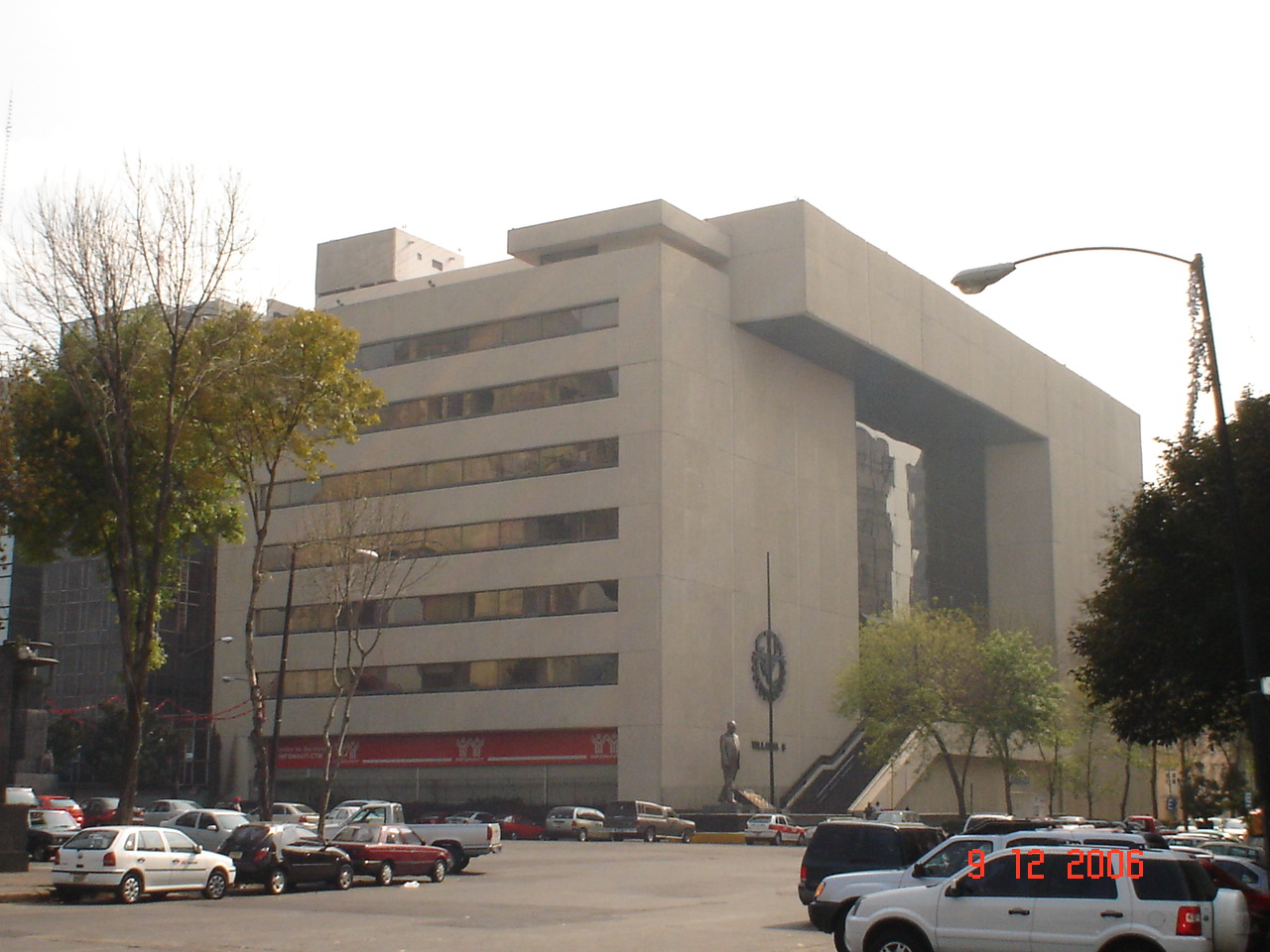
CTM headquarters

The CTM then proceeded, with the implicit help of the State, to eliminate independent union leaders in industrial unions such as miners, oil and railroad workers. The state exercised its authority to oust uncooperative union leaders, either by removing them directly or manipulating internal union elections. The CTM concurred, leading some observers to joke that the CTM (which in Spanish is pronounced "se te eme") now meant "se teme" ("to be feared").

New leaders thus imposed were referred to as "charros", or "cowboys", after Jesús Díaz de León, the new leader of the railroad workers union in 1948, who was fond of the finery associated with Mexican cowboys. The government coerced the Sindicato de Trabajadores Petroleros de la República Mexicana, the union that represented the oil workers at PEMEX, to accept Gustavo Roldán Vargas as its new leader in 1949. Likewise, Jesús Carrasco was imposed on the Miners and Metal Workers Union (the SNTMMSRM) in 1950.

These heavy-handed efforts did not always go unopposed: when the government installed Carrasco as the head of the SNTMMSRM, a number of locals bolted from the union to form the National Miners Union. When a strike broke out at the Nueva Rosita coal mine in 1950, the employer forced local businesses to refuse to sell food to the strikers. In the meantime the government declared martial law in the area, arrested the rebel union leaders, seized the union's treasury and prohibited further meetings. The government used similar tactics in 1959 after the nationalization of the rail industry, firing thousands of strikers and sentencing union leaders to more than ten years in prison. The CTM approved these and other measures to isolate or eliminate independent unions and rebel movements within its membership.

The CTM did not hold a monopoly on labor organizing or even the exclusive relationship with the PRI: the CROM and other organizations also had a formal relationship with the PRI through the Congreso de Trabajo (CT). The CTM had, however, the advantage of State sponsorship, which it used to oppose any independent unions and to hold down the demands of its constituent unions at the behest of PRI leadership. The CTM adopted a practice of entering into "protection contracts"—also known as sweetheart deals—where the workers not only had no role in negotiating, but in some cases did not even know such deals existed. Many of these "unions" degenerated into organizations that "sold" contracts to a CTM affiliate as a guarantee against representation by independent unions, but which did not function as unions in any meaningful sense.

== The "age of dinosaurs" ==
Those PRI leaders who stayed within the circle of power acquired the derogative nickname of "dinosaurs". Fidel Velázquez was the longest-lived of them all and one of the most conservative as well.

Velázquez and the CTM opposed every major movement that ran against the status quo prevalent in the country: in 1968 he verbally attacked the student demonstrators who supported Cuba and demanded democratic reforms in Mexico, calling them radicals inspired by foreign doctrines. The government went further, killing three hundred students in the Tlatelolco massacre that same year. Velázquez openly supported the suppression of this movement.

In 1972 the CTM expelled the Sindicato de Trabajadores Electricistas de la República Mexicana (STERM), a union of electrical workers that had demanded union democracy and taken a more militant stance toward employers. When the union did not collapse after pressure from the CTM, the government merged it with another union to form the new Sindicato ''Único'' de Trabajadores Electricistas de la República Mexicana (SUTERM). Velázquez intervened in SUTERM's internal affairs to drive out the former leaders of STERM, after which employers blacklisted them and their supporters.

Even then, those workers persisted by organizing rallies of more than 100,000 electrical workers and their supporters and calling a strike against the Federal Electrical Commission (CFE) on July 16, 1976. The strike was ended by army units and hired thugs who occupied the CFE plants; the army interned hundreds of strikers in San Luis Potosí, San Luis Potosí, while thugs beat workers and forced them to sign letters supporting the charro leadership of the SUTERM.

Velázquez was the first to demand that Cuauhtémoc Cárdenas, who organized the Democratic Current within the PRI in 1987, be expelled from the PRI for his campaign for democratization and challenging the entrenched leadership. Velázquez called Cárdenas a violent radical and suggested that he was a communist. Velázquez was also one of the first to condemn the Ejército Zapatista de Liberación Nacional (EZLN) when it started an armed rebellion in Chiapas in 1994.

Velázquez was also a faithful supporter of the technocrat current within the PRI, which sought to dismantle the nationalist economic policies of the Mexican Revolution in order to open México to foreign investment. Velázquez supported technocrat Presidents Miguel de la Madrid, Carlos Salinas de Gortari, and Ernesto Zedillo Ponce de Leon as they privatized state-owned enterprises (formerly a bastion of power for the CTM) as part of the structural adjustment plans imposed by the International Monetary Fund. During those years the minimum wage in real terms fell by nearly 70 percent. Velázquez also supported passage of the North American Free Trade Agreement in 1993 after initially denouncing it as a disaster for workers of all three countries.

Even so, Velázquez's power within the PRI slipped in the 1990s as his own health declined. While in the past every President of Mexico consulted Velázquez before picking his successor, Velázquez was not consulted in the selection of Luis Donaldo Colosio as the PRI's presidential candidate in 1994. Even after Colosio's assassination Velázquez was only told that Ernesto Zedillo was the new presidential candidate a few minutes before the formal announcement.

Velázquez called off the traditional May Day rallies in 1995, threatening those who disobeyed with fines or expulsion, in order to avoid the possibility of embarrassing displays of opposition to the CTM and the PRI. Instead of a May Day march in 1996 a group set up a mock funeral for Velázquez in retaliation.

The real funeral, attended by the entire Mexican political elite, came a year later in 1997. President Zedillo said in his eulogy that "Don Fidel knew how to reconcile the special interests of workers with the greater interest of the nation."

Velázquez's interim successor, Blas Chumacero, died three weeks after Velázquez, aged 92. He was succeeded in turn by Leonardo Rodríguez Alcaine, aged 76.

== Challenges from outside and within ==
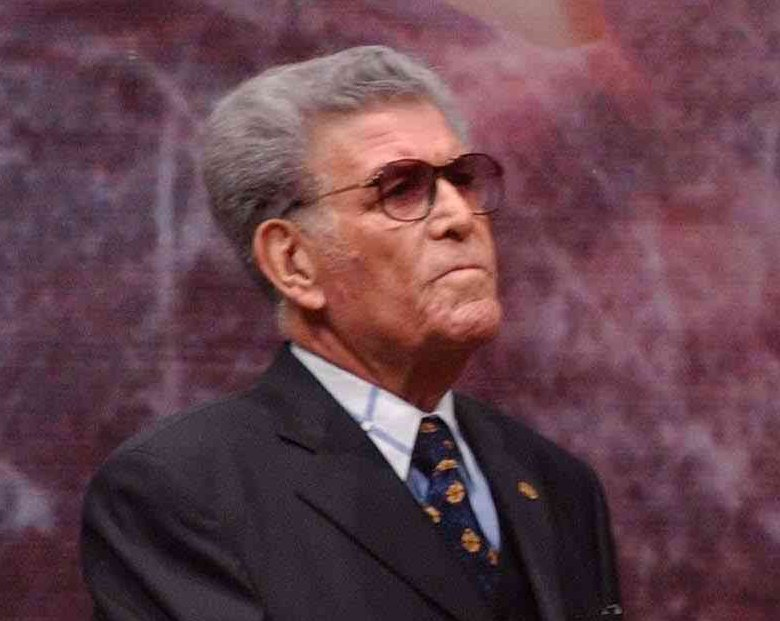
Leonardo Rodríguez Alcaine

Although the CTM remained the largest and best established union within Mexico, it was not the only one. In the 1990s it faced growing challenges to its power from the National Union of Workers (UNT), a federation of independent unions established in November 1997; the Authentic Labor Front (FAT), a union within the UNT, won representation rights within the restrictive procedures provided under Mexican law.

The CTM's unions also faced challenges from within: dissenting members of the SUTERM challenged Alcaine's leadership, as also did members of the Petroleum Workers Union.

== The CTM after the PRI era ==
While President Fox's party (PAN), had historically favored company unions over CTM affiliates, Fox continued to work with the conservative leadership of the CTM after taking office in 2000. His administration took the side of the Confederación Revolucionaria de Obreros y Campesinos (CROC), a union with a corrupt history at odds with its flamboyant name, against an independent union attempting to organize workers at Duro Bag Company in Tamaulipas. Fox's Secretary of Labor, Carlos Abascal, repeatedly praised the CTM, while Alcaine pledged support for Fox's PAN government.

Some CTM leaders have also supported Abascal's—and later, Felipe Calderón's (PAN) —proposals for labor law reform: these are intended to tighten government control on union formation and grant employers new powers to make decisions without consulting the union, all while preserving the secretive and complex system that allows the government to marginalize independent unions in favor of those acceptable to the party in power or to business interests. Others within the CTM have opposed any changes in the law, calling for it to be enforced instead.
