= Tereso Medina Ramírez =

Mexican politician

- Born: 15 October 1962 (age 63); Coahuila, Mexico
- Occupation: Politician
- Political party: PRI

Tereso Medina Ramírez (born 15 October 1962) is a Mexican politician from the Institutional Revolutionary Party. From 2009 to 2012 he served as Deputy of the LXI Legislature of the Mexican Congress representing Coahuila, and previously served in the Congress of Coahuila.
