= Confederación de los Trabajadores de América Latina =

Trade union in Latin America

The Confederación de los Trabajadores de América Latina (CTAL) was a continental trade union federation for Latin America in the mid-20th century.

== History ==
The CTAL was conceived at the first International Labour Organization conference on the Americas in January 1936 when the Latin American resolved to form a strong continental labor organization. This was followed up by a call from the Confederación de Trabajadores de México for a congress in 1938.

This congress created the Confederación de los Trabajadores de América Latina and elected Vicente Lombardo Toledano president. The new organization declared that "the social regime that now prevails in most countries on Earth has to be substituted by a regime of justice based on the abolition of man by man". It also condemned Nazism and Fascism in the strongest possible terms.

CTAL was very active during World War II, creating unions where they were non-existent, uniting previously existing unions and assuring that ILO standards like freedom of association, collective bargaining, the right to strike and indigenous rights were respected. After the war, it called for the industrialization of Latin America to further its development.

After the war most of CTALs affiliates attended the founding conference of the World Federation of Trade Unions in Paris and the CTAL soon became the WFTU's regional organization. However, after the split in the WFTU in 1949 the CTAL was severely weakened. May affiliates drifted away and the Confederation lost strength. Its remaining members agreed to dissolve CTAL in 1964.

== See also ==
- Confederación Sindical Latinoamericana, an earlier Communist affiliated Latin American labor federation
- Confederación Interamericana de Trabajadores, an A.F.L. affiliated federation designed to compete with CTAL
- Permanent Congress of Trade Union Unity of Latin America
- Serafino Romualdi

== Bibliography ==
- Coldrick, A. P. (1979). The international directory of the trade union movement. New York: Facts on File. ISBN 0871963744.
