= Trade Union Confederation of the Americas =

Regional trade union federation

- Confederación Sindical de trabajadoras y trabajadores de las Américas
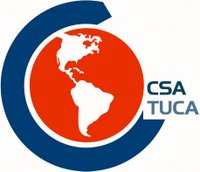
- Abbreviation: TUCA
- Formation: 27 March 2008
- Merger of: ICFTU Inter American Regional Organisation of Workers; Latin American Confederation of Workers
- Type: Trade union centre
- Headquarters: Montevideo, Uruguay
- Location: Americas
- Members: 55 million
- President: Fred Redmond
- Deputy presidents: Francisca Jiménez; Toni Moore
- General secretary: Rafael Freire Neto
- Parent organization: International Trade Union Confederation

The Trade Union Confederation of the Americas (TUCA-CSA) is the regional organization of the International Trade Union Confederation for the Americas.

== History ==
The confederation was formed in March 2008 when the ICFTU Inter American Regional Organisation of Workers merged with the Latin American Confederation of Workers. The organization has 48 affiliated organizations, in 21 countries, representing 55 million workers.

== Leadership ==
=== General Secretaries ===
2008: Víctor Báez
2018: Rafael Freire Neto

=== Presidents ===
2008: Linda Chavez-Thompson
2012: Hassan Yussuff
2021: Fred Redmond
