= General Confederation of Workers (Mexico) =

Mexican trade union

- Confederación General de Trabajadores
- Abbreviation: CGT
- Founded: 1921
- Location: Mexico

La Confederación General de Trabajadores fue una federación de sindicalistas enMexico. Fue fundada en febrero de 1921 por anarquistas, sindicalistas y otrxs ideólogxs de la izquierda profunda, que se oponía a su modalidad más moderada, la estatista Confederación Regional Obrera Mexicana (CROM). En particular, los fundadores de la CGT criticaban la cercana relación de CROM con la conservadora AFL (American Federation of Labor). Los síndico se separarán de CROM con 43 afiliaciones a la nueva CGT, aunque solo representaba la décima parte de CROM, con epecial fuerza entre los trabajadores textiles. El Presidente Alvaro Obregón (1920-1924) favorecía a la CROM, y su administración intentó reprimir a la CGT. Cuando Adolfo de la Huerta hizo una apuesta por la presidencia en 1923 con una rebelión armada, recibió el apoyo de algunos de la CGT.

Poco después de su formación, la CGT se alió con el Partido Comunista Mexicano (PCM), pero disputas terminaron la relación casi de inmediato. En las décadas siguientes, la CGT se tornó cada vez más anti-comunista. La CGT se mantuvo mucho más pequeña que la CROM, y para 1930 ambas federaciones fueron absorbidas por la Confederación de Trabajadores Mexicanos (CTM).

== See also ==
- Anarchism in Mexico

== Bibliography ==
- Hart, John M. (1978). "The Aftermath of August 1916: Continued Activity". Anarchism & the Mexican Working Class, 1860-1931. University of Texas Press. pp. 156–177. doi:10.7560/703315-011. ISBN 0-292-70400-3.
- Hart, John M. (1990). "Revolutionary Syndicalism in Mexico". In van der Linden, Marcel; Thorpe, Wayne (eds.). Revolutionary Syndicalism: an International Perspective. Gower Publishing. pp. 185–202. ISBN 0-85967-815-6.
- Thorpe, Wayne (1989). The Workers Themselves. Kluwer Academic Publishers. ISBN 0-7923-0276-1. LCCN 89-8205.
- van der Walt, Lucien; Schmidt, Michael (2009). Black Flame: The Revolutionary Class Politics of Anarchism and Syndicalism. Edinburgh: AK Press. ISBN 978-1-904859-16-1. LCCN 2006933558. OCLC 1100238201.
