= Confederation of Honduran Workers =

National trade union center in Honduras

CTH
- Confederation of Honduran Workers
- Confederación de Trabajadores de Honduras
- Founded: 1964
- Headquarters: Tegucigalpa, Honduras
- Location: Honduras
- Key people: Dinora Aceituno, general secretary
- Affiliations: ITUC

The Confederation of Honduran Workers (Spanish: Confederación de Trabajadores de Honduras, CTH) is the largest national trade union center in Honduras. It was formed in 1964. The CTH is affiliated with the International Trade Union Confederation.

== History ==
The CTH was formed ten years after the legalization of trade unions in Honduras after a successful strike in 1954. In 1964, ORIT sponsored the creation of CTH, which received financial support from the United States. The CTH supported the regime of Oswaldo López Arellano during the Football War in 1969. In 1971 the CTH promoted the creation of a coalition government of Honduras' two dominant political parties under president Ramón Ernesto Cruz of the National Party of Honduras. This government failed, and when López Arellano returned to power in a military coup amidst social crisis in December 1972, CTH became an important part of his power base.
