= Convergencia Sindical =

- Convergencia Sindical
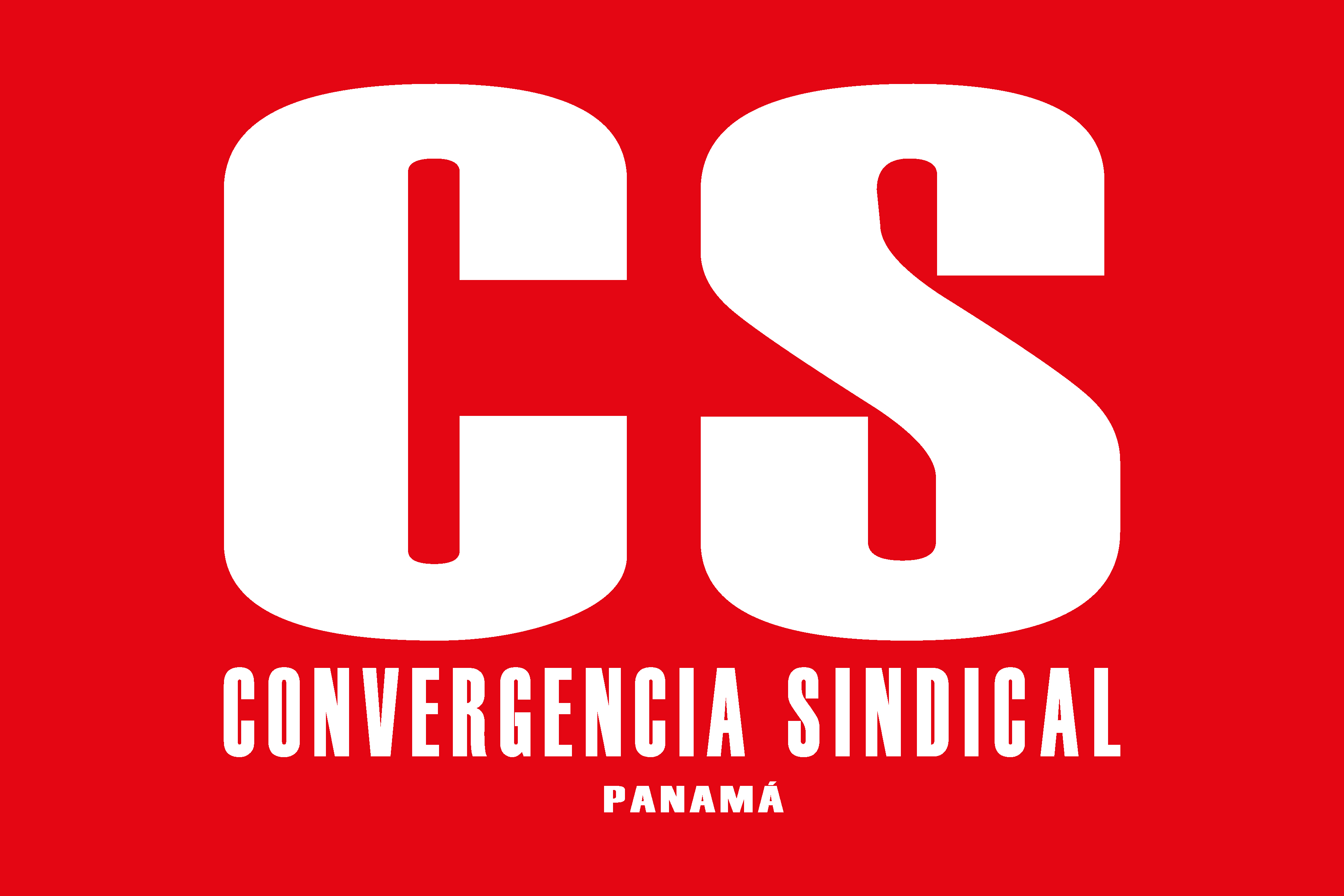
- Headquarters: Panama City, Panama
- Location: Panama
- Affiliations: ITUC

The Convergencia Sindical is a national trade union center in Panama. It is affiliated with the International Trade Union Confederation.

It is one of several such organizations in Panama, with 75,000 members as of 2006 and 33,800 members as of 2012. Others include:

- Confederación General de Trabajadores de Panama (CGTP, 53,250 members, as of 2006)
- Confederación de Trabajadores de la República de Panamá (CTRP, 40,000 members, as of 2006)
- Central Nacional de Trabajadores de Panamá (as of 2014)
- El Sindicato Único Nacional de Trabajadores de la Industria de la Construcción y Similares (as of 2014).
