= Sindicato de Trabajadores Ferrocarrileros de la República Mexicana =

The Union of Railroad Workers of the Mexican Republic (Spanish: Sindicato de Trabajadores Ferrocarrileros de la Republica Mexicana, or STFRM) is labor union that represents railroad workers in Mexico. It was founded in 1933. It became affiliated with the Confederation of Mexican Workers (CTM) in 1936. It is enrolled in the PRI.
