= Confederación de Trabajadores Unitaria =

Trade union centre in the Dominican Republic

CTU
- Confederación de Trabajadores Unitaria
- Headquarters: Santo Domingo, Dominican Republic
- Location: Dominican Republic
- Key people: Nelsida Altagracia Marmolejos, president Jacinto de los Santos, general secretary
- Affiliations: ITUC

The Confederación de Trabajadores Unitaria (CTU) is a trade union centre in the Dominican Republic. It was formed by the merging of four previous unions. It is affiliated with the International Trade Union Confederation.
