= Latin American Confederation of Workers =

CLAT
- Latin American Confederation of Workers
- Central Latinoamericana de Trabajadores
- Founded: 1954
- Dissolved: 2008
- Headquarters: Caracas, Venezuela
- Location: Latin America, Caribbean
- Affiliations: International Trade Union Confederation

The Latin American Confederation of Workers (Spanish: Central Latinoamericana de Trabajadores, CLAT), was the World Confederation of Labour's (WCL) regional organization for Latin America and the Caribbean. The WCL merged with the International Confederation of Free Trade Unions in 2006, and in 2008, CLAT merged with the ICFTU Inter American Regional Organisation of Workers to form the Trade Union Confederation of the Americas.
