= Luis Alberto Monge =

President of Costa Rica from 1982 to 1986

Luis Alberto Monge OMRI OYC
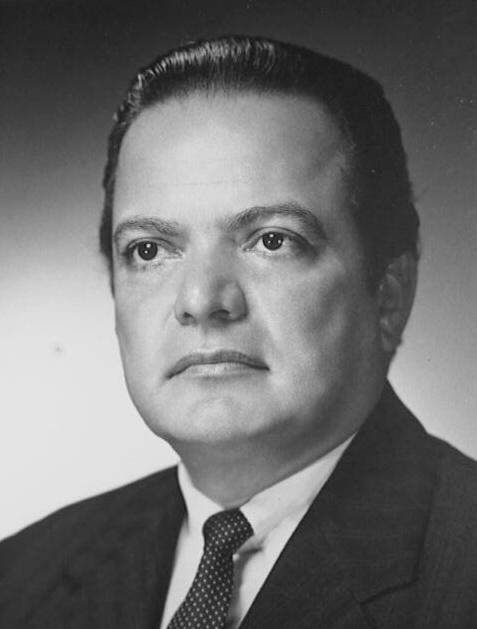
- Monge, c. 1973

39th President of Costa Rica
- In office 8 May 1982 – 8 May 1986
- Vice President: Alberto Fait Lizano; Armando Aráuz Aguilar
- Preceded by: Rodrigo Carazo Odio
- Succeeded by: Óscar Arias Sánchez

17th President of the Legislative Assembly of Costa Rica
- In office 1 May 1973 – 30 April 1974
- Preceded by: Daniel Oduber Quirós
- Succeeded by: Alfonso Carro Zúñiga

Deputy of the Legislative Assembly of Costa Rica
- In office 1 May 1970 – 30 April 1974
- Preceded by: Fernando Volio Jiménez
- Succeeded by: José Manuel Salazar Navarrete
- Constituency: San José (2nd Office)
- In office 1 May 1958 – 30 April 1962
- Preceded by: Otto Cortés Fernández
- Succeeded by: Teodoro Quirós Castro
- Constituency: San José (2nd Office)

Additional positions
- 1967-1970: Secretary-General of the National Liberation Party
- 1963-1966: Ambassador to Israel
- 1949: Member of the National Constituent Assembly

Personal details
- Born: Luis Alberto Monge Álvarez; 29 December 1925 Palmares, Alajuela, Costa Rica
- Died: 29 November 2016 (aged 90) San José, Costa Rica
- Party: National Liberation Party (from 1951)
- Spouses: Flora Rojas Alvarez (m. 1946; div. 1960) Doris Yankelewitz Berger (m. 1965; div. 1988)
- Children: 5
- Relatives: Rolando Araya Monge (nephew); Johnny Araya Monge (nephew)
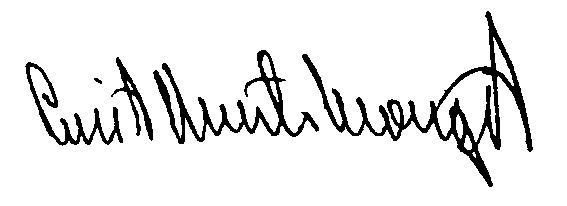
- Signature

Military service
- Allegiance: Costa Rica
- Branch/service: Costa Rican Army
- Years of service: 1948
- Rank: Captain

Luis Alberto Monge Álvarez (29 December 1925 – 29 November 2016) was a Costa Rican trade unionist and politician who served as the 39th President of Costa Rica from 1982 to 1986. A member of the National Liberation Party, he also served as Costa Rica's first Ambassador to Israel from 1963 until 1966.

== Biography ==
=== Early and personal life ===
Monge was born on December 29, 1925, in Palmares, Alajuela Province, to Gerardo Monge Quesada and Elisa Álvarez Vargas.

He married his first wife, Flora Rojas Alvarez, on March 9, 1946, but the marriage was dissolved in January 1960. Luis and Flora had 5 children: Flora, Myriam, Luis Alberto, Jorge, and Alfredo. He met his second wife, Doris Yankelewitz Berger, while both were attending a luncheon at the University of Costa Rica. At the time, Yankelewitz was a college student while Monge was serving as Ambassador to Israel. Monge and Yankelewitz married at a ceremony in San José on November 25, 1965. They had one daughter, Lena.

Monge and Yankelewitz later separated at the end of his presidency in 1986. The couple divorced in June 1988.

=== Career ===
Before becoming President in 1982, Monge served as Costa Rica's first ambassador to Israel from 1963 to 1966 and was one of the founding members of the National Liberation Party (PLN) in 1951. He was also named a deputy in the Legislative Assembly, at age 24, making him one of the youngest to have reached such rank. He was the President of the Legislative Assembly of Costa Rica from 1973 to 1974.

Monge inherited an impoverished and distraught nation. The biggest issues his presidency dealt with were: the unmanageable economic crisis, the mounting foreign debt and the Sandinista-Contra crisis involving Nicaragua, the United States and Costa Rica's northern border region.

In dealing with the country's economic situation, he began austere programs on public spending, eliminated many government subsidies to various activities and promoted exports and receptive tourism. He eliminated export and production taxes. Monge also reformed monetary law, and forced all foreign currencies to go through the national bank system. A lot of his efforts paid off, reducing inflation and unemployment. During Monge's term, Costa Rica declared an alignment with all "western democracies" and began to work closely with the governments of Honduras, El Salvador and Guatemala, while its relationship with Nicaragua continued to deteriorate.

By then, the United States was involved in suppressing further socialist revolts in the region and saw Costa Rica as a stable ally in which to base their operations against Nicaragua's Sandinista government. The U.S. imposed a commercial embargo against Nicaragua, facilitating the deepening of the rift between Costa Rica and its northern neighbor. Unwillingly, Costa Rica became too involved in the United States' struggle to topple the Sandinistas and in an attempt to pull away, proclaimed Costa Rica as an active, neutral nation. With Costa Rica still in the midst of a terrible economic recession, Monge opted to exchange sovereignty for economic stability: he gave in to pressure from the United States and accepted American financial assistance in exchange for allowing the CIA to set up small "unofficial" strategic outposts along the northern border.

Shortly after becoming President, Monge traveled to Israel, where, without knowing about the United Nations Security Council Resolution 478, he raised the national flag on Costa Rica's embassy building in Jerusalem. He defined his actions as "exercising sovereignty".

== Death ==
On November 29, 2016, Monge suffered a cardiorespiratory arrest at his home in Santa Ana. He was rushed to the San Juan de Dios hospital, where he was declared dead aged 90.

Political offices
Preceded by Rodrigo Carazo Odio	President of Costa Rica; 1982–1986	Succeeded by Óscar Arias
Trade union offices
Preceded by Francisco Aguirre	General Secretary of the ICFTU Inter American Regional Organisation of Workers; 1952–1958	Succeeded by Alfonso Sánchez Madariaga
