= Confederación de Trabajadores del Perú =

Trade union center in Peru

CTP
- Confederación de Trabajadores del Perú
- Headquarters: Lima, Peru
- Location: Peru
- Key people: Douglas Figueroa Silva, general secretary

The Confederación de Trabajadores del Perú (CTP) is a trade union center in Peru.
