= Sweetheart deal =

Agreement advantageous to negotiators instead of represented interests

A sweetheart deal or sweetheart contract is a contractual agreement, usually worked out in secret, that greatly benefits some of the parties while inappropriately disadvantaging other parties or the public at large. The term was coined in the 1940s to describe corrupt labor contracts that were favorable to the employer rather than the workers, and usually involved some kind of kickback or special treatment for the labor negotiator.

The term is also applied to special arrangements between private corporations and government entities, whereby the corporation and sometimes a government official reap the benefits, rather than the public. No-bid contracts may be awarded to people who have political connections or make donations to influential politicians. Sometimes a sweetheart deal involves tax breaks or other inducements to get a corporation to do business in that city or state.

A "sweetheart settlement" may also occur in a legal context. For example, in a class-action lawsuit the attorneys representing a class of plaintiffs may reach an agreement with the defendant in which the primary result is a lucrative fee for the attorneys rather than maximum compensation for the class members.

== Noted instances and allegations ==
- In a 1947 unionization dispute, San Francisco area grocery store owners claimed that other stores who had "given in" to union demands had signed sweetheart deals with the unions.
- In a 1949 dispute between the rival American Federation of Labor (AFL) and the Congress of Industrial Organizations (CIO) involving unionization of the laundry industry in Indianapolis, Indiana, a lawyer for the 42 laundry and dry-cleaning plants testified before the National Labor Relations Board that an AFL union contract was not a sweetheart deal between the employers and AFL union officials, as alleged by the CIO.
- The terms of a 2008 plea bargain to settle criminal charges against financier Jeffrey Epstein have been called a sweetheart deal by many commentators.
- The Tax Cuts and Jobs Act of 2017 was said to contain an obscure sweetheart deal for certain tech companies.

== Legal reform ==
The 1959 Landrum-Griffin Act was a federal law that attempted to prevent sweetheart labor contracts and other forms of corrupt dealing by unions in the USA.

== 2019 study ==
A 2019 study examined the language of government contracts, looking for "sweetheart terms" – wording that is "highly favorable to the firm, but not obviously advantageous to the government". They found that such language is more commonly included in contracts with firms that make political contributions.
