= Unión de Trabajadores Colombianos =

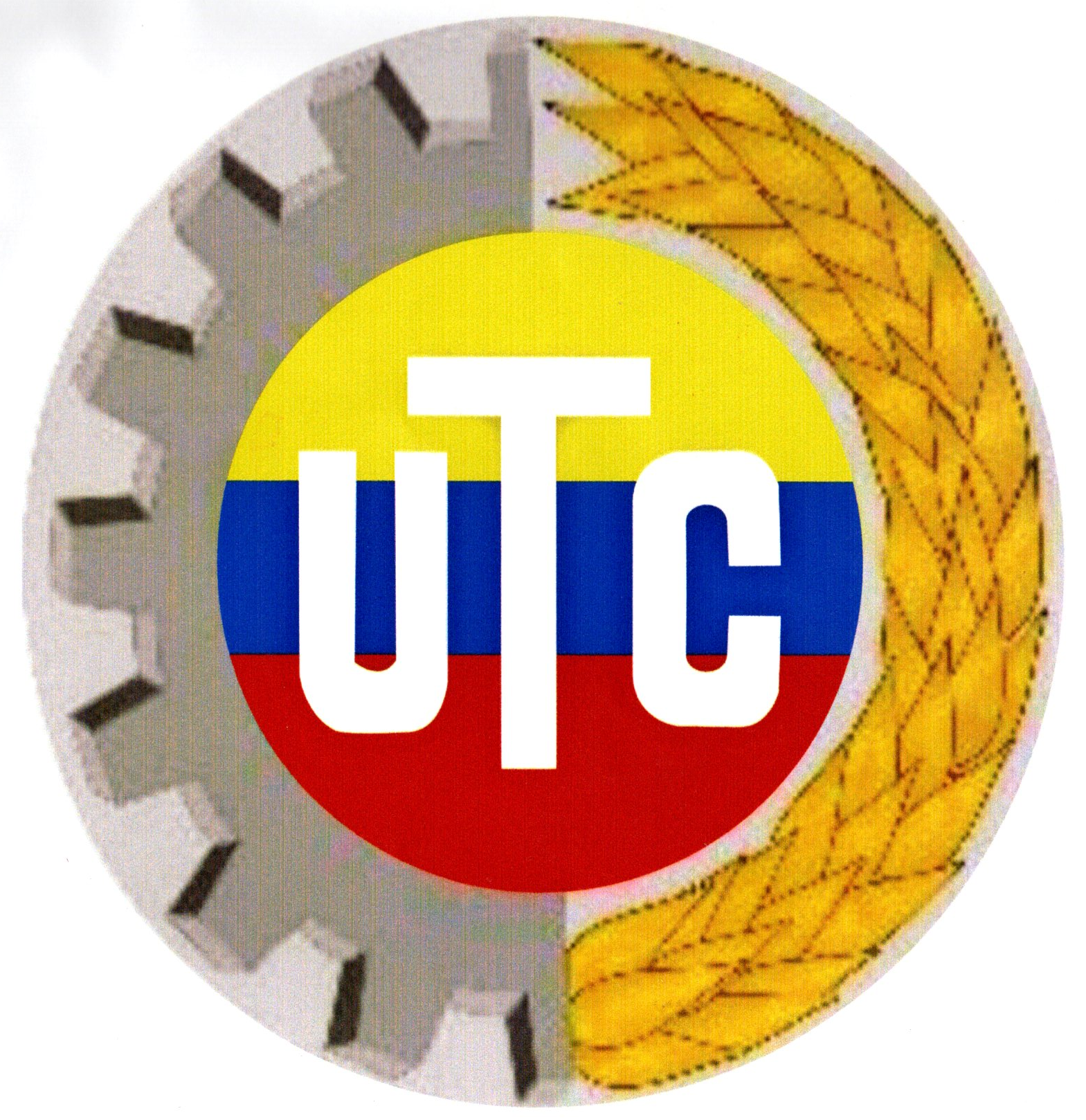
- Abbreviation: UTC
- Formation: June 1946; 79 years ago
- Type: National trade union center
- President: Carlos Alberto Sánchez Grass

The Unión de Trabajadores Colombianos (UTC; transl. Union of Colombian Workers) is a trade union confederation in Colombia.

== History ==
UTC was founded by the Jesuit elements of the Roman Catholic Church in June 1946, as the Liberal-led Confederación de Trabajadores de Colombia was in a weakened state. UTC was based on Catholic social doctrine. A core sector of the newly founded UTC were the Catholic trade unions in the textile factories of Medellín.

UTC immediately attracted many members—some from the ranks of the CTC and others from small unions, particularly industry groups—that had not been enticed to join the leftist CTC. Both industrialists and the Conservative government supported the UTC, largely because it did not represent a threat to the political and economic elite. The subsequent period of labor repression and co-option by the government served to eliminate radical elements of the movement while taming the less militant segments.

The near anarchy that followed the 1948 assassination of Jorge Eliécer Gaitán, a member of Congress who had long been a champion of the disadvantaged, had a different although equally demoralizing effect on rural workers. The plight of smallholder coffee farmers worsened rapidly, and many of them fled the countryside in the face of widespread violence. This served to consolidate landholdings in rural areas, as well as drive large numbers of unskilled rural laborers into the hands of the UTC. Collectively, labor emerged from the 1950s demoralized and virtually without political power. The UTC, which at this point commanded the majority of organized labor and the diminished rural groups, had no political means of effecting even the slightest changes and was without an advocate in national government.

Gradually, UTC acquired a more secular profile. During the National Front period the UTC faced numerous internal problems, which caused many individual unions to withdraw from its ranks. Moreover, the UTC (along with CTC) was increasingly seen as instruments of the political elite, a factor contributing to its decreasing influence amongst Colombian workers.

During the 1980s, UTC had entered into severe crisis.
