= Regional Confederation of Mexican Workers =

Trade union center (1918–)

CROM
- Regional Confederation of Mexican Workers
- Confederación Regional Obrera Mexicana
- Founded: 12 May 1918
- Founded at: Saltillo
- Headquarters: C. Juan Aldama 75, Col. Buenavista, Delg. Cuauhtémoc, C.P. 06350 Ciudad de México
- Location: Mexico
- Secretary General: Rodolfo Gerardo González Guzmán
- Website: cc.crom.org.mx

The Regional Confederation of Mexican Workers (Spanish: Confederación Regional Obrera Mexicana, CROM) is a federation of labor unions in Mexico, whose power was at its height between 1918 and 1928. CROM was an umbrella organization for both industrial workers as well as agricultural workers and peasants. Industrial unions of railway workers, petroleum workers, and textile workers were strong enough on their own that they could function without CROM's support.

It was founded in Saltillo in 1918 at a congress of labor delegates called by Mexican President Venustiano Carranza. The federation, of which Luis N. Morones was a major leader, marked a departure from the traditionally-anarchist stance of Mexican labor to a nationalist position.

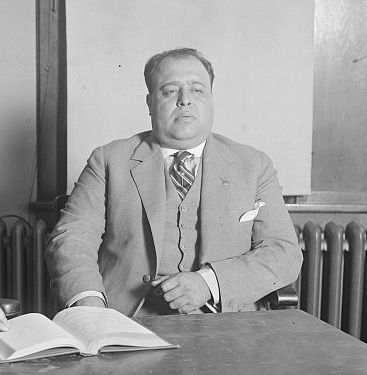
Luis N. Morones in 1925

From its inception, the CROM was controlled by a small group of union leaders, Grupo Acción ("Action Group") which supported the post-revolutionary Mexican government.

Logo of the Mexican Laborist Party

After supporting Carranza, who was overthrown in 1920, the CROM was a key base of support for two of his successors, Álvaro Obregón and Plutarco Elías Calles, two of the three Sonoran revolutionary generals who dominated Mexico in the 1920s. The political vehicle of the federation was the Mexican Laborist Party. Under Obregón, the labor movement was co-opted as its leaders were appointed to posts within the government. By the end of Obregón's term, labor had abandoned its goal of destroying capital in favor of establishing a balance between capital and labor that would benefit workers. Labor leaders defended the government's right, established in Article 123 of the Constitution of 1917, to arbitrate labor disputes, since they felt that their interests were represented in the government.

Radical elements of the labor movement, horrified by the cooption, formed their own federation, the Confederación General de Trabajadores (CGT), in 1921. The result of the split was disorientation within the movement, and workers became disillusioned with both the CROM and the CGT. Nonetheless, workers won some rights but gradually and threatening neither the revolutionary government nor the growth of capitalism.

In 1921, in a prelude to the Cristero War, the Mexican Catholic Church declared membership in the CROM a mortal sin. That proclamation failed to deter Mexicans from joining the federation or participating in its street demonstrations.

Under Calles, the government gained even greater control over the CROM by its grip over Grupo Acción. The CROM essentially monopolized union membership, claiming over one million workers and five hundred organized peasants among its members. In reality, there were only about twenty thousand dues-paying members. Calles wielded influence over the CROM through Morones, whom he appointed the Minister of commerce and industry.

By 1928, however, Calles had become distrustful of Morones, who had presidential ambitions. He was also wary of labor's socialist interpretation of the revolution. He broke the CROM's power by ordering the federal arbitrating bureaucracies to declare all CROM strikes illegal. The CROM's leadership had become so corrupt that it had lost its influence with the rank and file and was thus unable to organize action in its favor.

Calles's successor, Emilio Portes Gil, began removing CROM officials from government positions. Vicente Lombardo Toledano, a dissident in the CROM, organized a faction called "Purified CROM" that left the federation in 1932, leaving the CROM to represent only a few unions in the textile industry. The Purified CROM became the Confederation of Mexican Workers (CTM) in 1936, allying with the populist President Lázaro Cárdenas and the ruling Party of the Mexican Revolution. In the following years, the CTM eclipsed the CROM.

The CROM continues to exist, and is the third largest labor federation in Mexico, supporting the PRD.
