= Vicente Lombardo Toledano =

Mexican politician

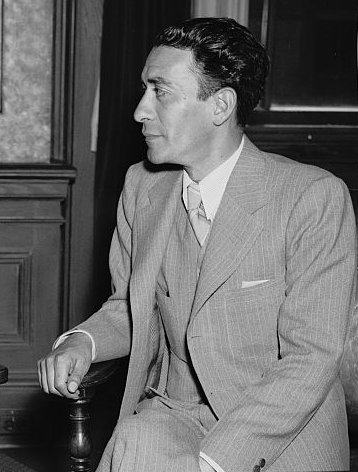
- Lombardo Toledano in 1938

Governor of Puebla
- In office 10 December 1923 – 20 March 1924
- Preceded by: Froylán C. Manjarrez
- Succeeded by: Francisco Espinoza Fleury

Personal details
- Born: 16 June 1894 Teziutlán, Puebla, Mexico
- Died: 16 November 1968 (aged 74) Mexico City, D.F., Mexico
- Resting place: Panteón de Dolores
- Party: Popular Socialist Party
- Education: National Autonomous University of Mexico

Vicente Lombardo Toledano (July 16, 1894 – November 16, 1968) was one of the foremost Mexican labor leaders of the 20th century, called "the dean of Mexican Marxism [and] the best-known link between Mexico and the international world of Marxism and socialism." In 1936, he founded the Confederation of Mexican Workers (CTM), the national labor federation most closely associated with the ruling party founded by President Lázaro Cárdenas, the Party of the Mexican Revolution (PRM). After he was purged from the union after World War II, Lombardo Toledano co-founded the political party "Partido Popular" along with Narciso Bassols, which later became known as the Partido Popular Socialista.

== Early career ==
Lombardo Toledano was born in Teziutlán, Puebla, to middle-class parents, Vincente Lombardo Carpio and Isabel Toledano Toledano; his father was of Italian ancestry, while his mother was from Teziutlán, of Sephardic Jewish descent from the Toledano family. (Note: His father, Vicente Lombardo Carpio, was the son of Marcelina Carpio and Vincenzo Lombardo Catti (an Italian immigrant to Mexico). His mother, a native of Teziutlán, was of Spanish Jewish descent.) After obtaining his law degree from the National Autonomous University of Mexico (UNAM) in 1919, he pursued a master's degree in philosophy and letters there, and he began teaching at both the Popular University and at UNAM. He taught at UNAM until 1933, and it was there that he became a member of an informal group known as los siete sabios (the seven sages). During his tenure at the UNAM, Lombardo Toledano helped to organize a teachers' union. In 1921 he joined the Labor Party.

As leader of that teachers' union, Lombardo Toledano entered the Confederación Regional Obrera Mexicana (CROM), the largest and most powerful union confederation of the day and a key supporter of the regimes of Presidents Plutarco Elías Calles and Álvaro Obregón. Lombardo Toledano served as the house intellectual for CROM, not benefiting directly from its corruption but acquiring access to power instead. Lombardo Toledano then served as interim Governor of Puebla in 1923, was a councilman in the Federal District in 1924 to 1925, and was a congressional deputy from 1926 to 1928.

In 1925, during his tenure as a councilman, he met with the colleague Juan Rico and chose the day March 13th to celebrate the 600th anniversary of the founding of Tenochtitlan.

CROM lost most of its influence in 1928 after a right-wing Roman Catholic associated with the Cristero movement assassinated Obregón. Lombardo Toledano then left CROM and the Labor Party in 1932. He had organized a faction which he called the "Purified CROM" who left the CROM en masse in 1932. This mass flight left the CROM representing only a few unions in the textile industry. The Purified CROM became the Confederation of Mexican Workers (CTM) in 1936, allying with the populist President Lázaro Cárdenas and the ruling Party of the Mexican Revolution (PRM), a rival to the Labor Party associated with CROM. Lombardo Toledano was the secretary general of the CTM from 1936 to 1940.

== Formation of the CTM and alliance with Cárdenas ==
Outside of the CROM, Lombardo Toledano began to build a rival federation that combined his "purified" CROM with other labor groups. Among the first with whom he allied was the Confederación Sindical de Trabajadores del Distrito Federal, a union that included among its members not only low-wage workers but professionals, strikebreakers, some street vendors, and other members of the informal economy. Fidel Velázquez Sánchez was one of los cinco lobitos (the five wolf cubs) who led the CSTDF. Further distancing himself from Velázquez's group and the CGT, Lombardo Toledano formed a new federation, the Confederación General de Obreros y Campesinos de México (CGOCM). That group subsequently transformed itself into the CTM in 1936.

The CTM had a strong relationship with the government of Lázaro Cárdenas del Río from its inception. While Lombardo Toledano had opposed Cárdenas' candidacy in 1934, the CTM was the chief beneficiary of Cárdenas' need for labor support for his government after the employers of Monterrey, Nuevo León, called an employers' strike on February 5, 1936. Cárdenas led a demonstration in Monterrey in which he called for unification of the various labor organizations into one national body associated with the PRI, then named the Partido Revolucionario Mexicano. The political crisis deepened when Calles launched a series of verbal attacks on Cárdenas that amounted to a call for his overthrow. The "Purified" CROM, the CSTDF, other labor bodies, and the PCM rallied to defend Cárdenas. With their support Cárdenas had Calles and Morones arrested and deported that year.

The CTM was formed shortly thereafter, absorbing the major petroleum workers and railroad workers unions. It also had the support of the Mexican Communist Party (PCM) and the industrial unions it had founded. Those unions nearly walked out of the CTM twice in its early years, however. The first time that they threatened to leave was at the founding convention of the CTM in 1936, when Lombardo Toledano chose Velázquez (rather than the individual from their wing who had been promised the position) as organizational secretary of the new organization and a second time the following year. In both cases, however, the unions returned under orders to accept unity at any cost as part of the party's Popular Front policy.

Lombardo Toledano was never, as far as it is possible to determine, a member of the PCM. However, he had even stronger support from the Soviet Union during the Popular Front era than the nominal leaders of the PCM. Following the policy of that era, he and the CTM supported the Cárdenas administration enthusiastically, intervening to moderate union demands during the railroad workers' and electrical workers' strikes in 1936 and then the petroleum workers' strike in 1937. Lombardo Toledano and the CTM were vocal supporters for Cárdenas' nationalization of the oil industry in 1938. Lombardo Toledano also formed the Confederación de Trabajadores de América Latina in 1938. John L. Lewis from the Congress of Industrial Organizations attended its founding. The U.S. American Federation of Labor boycotted it.

== Fall from power ==
Manuel Ávila Camacho, a protégé of and successor to Cárdenas, was more conservative. He engineered Fidel Velázquez's appointment as head of the CTM when Lombardo Toledano did not stand for reelection in 1941. Lombardo Toledano remained influential in the CTM, pursuing a course of support for the war effort and opposition to strikes when Mexico entered the war against Hitler.

Lombardo Toledano soon fell out with both the CTM and the government. Although the CTM had (along with the CGT, CROM and the electrical workers union) formally aligned in 1938 with the precursor to the Institutional Revolutionary Party, the Party of the Mexican Revolution (PRM), Lombardo Toledano concluded that the PRI (now led by Miguel Alemán Valdés) was too conservative and formed his own party to run against it, the Partido Popular. The Partido Popular never achieved more than fringe party status, and it was renamed the Partido Popular Socialista in 1960. The CTM refused to support Lombardo Toledano's new party, and Fidel Velázquez formally expelled Lombardo Toledano from the CTM in 1948. Lombardo Toledano left the union, but only after delivering a bitter denunciation of those who had brought about his downfall. He referred to himself in the first person ("yo") sixty-four times in that speech — a fact noted by some newspapers, who proceeded to nickname him the "Yo-yo Champion".

Lombardo Toledano launched two publications (a magazine called América Latina and a daily named El Popular) while continuing to publish books, pamphlets, and newspaper articles. He also founded the Workers' University in 1936, which he headed until his death.

== Notes ==
Preceded by none	Secretary General of the Confederation of Mexican Workers; 1936–1941	Succeeded by Fidel Velázquez Sánchez
