= García (surname) =

- Pronunciation: /ɡɑːrˈsiːə/ gar-SEE-ə; Spanish: [ɡaɾˈθi.a] Latin American Spanish: [ɡaɾˈsi.a]
- Language: Spanish

Origin
- Language: Basque (likely)

Other names
- Variant forms: Garci, Garza, Garzia, Garcia, Garcés, Garcicea, Garciandia, Gassie, Gassion, Gaztea
- Related names: Gartzia

Garcia, Gartzia or García is an Iberian surname common throughout Spain, Portugal, Galicia, Andorra, the Americas, France and the Philippines. It is a surname of patronymic origin; García was a very common first name in early medieval Iberia.

== Origins ==
It may have been a Basque surname "Gaztea" which later was Castilianized in the medieval Kingdom of Castile to become "García".

It is attested since the High Middle Ages north and south of the Pyrenees (Basque Culture Territories), with the surname (and sometimes first name too) thriving, especially in the Kingdom of Navarre, and spreading out to Castile and other Spanish regions.

Alfonso Irigoyen believed it to derive from the Basque adjective garze(a) meaning "young", whose modern form is gaztea or gaztia. Ramón Menéndez Pidal and Antonio Tovar suggested it may come from the Basque word (H)artz, meaning "(the) Bear". A third etymology suggests it may derive from the Basque words "Gazte Hartz", meaning "(the) young bear". Variant forms of the name include Garcicea, Gartzi, Gartzia, Gartze, Garsea, and Gastea. The original Basque form with an affricate sibilant (/ts/, Basque spelling tz) evolved in Spanish to the current form.

There are Gasconic cognates of Garcia like Gassie and Gassion (Béarn, Gassio 14th century, real name of Edith Piaf, born Edith Gassion).

Other theories suggest that García is of Germanic origin and may derive from wars meaning young warrior or the Visigothic words garxa and garcha meaning graceful prince.

== Popularity ==
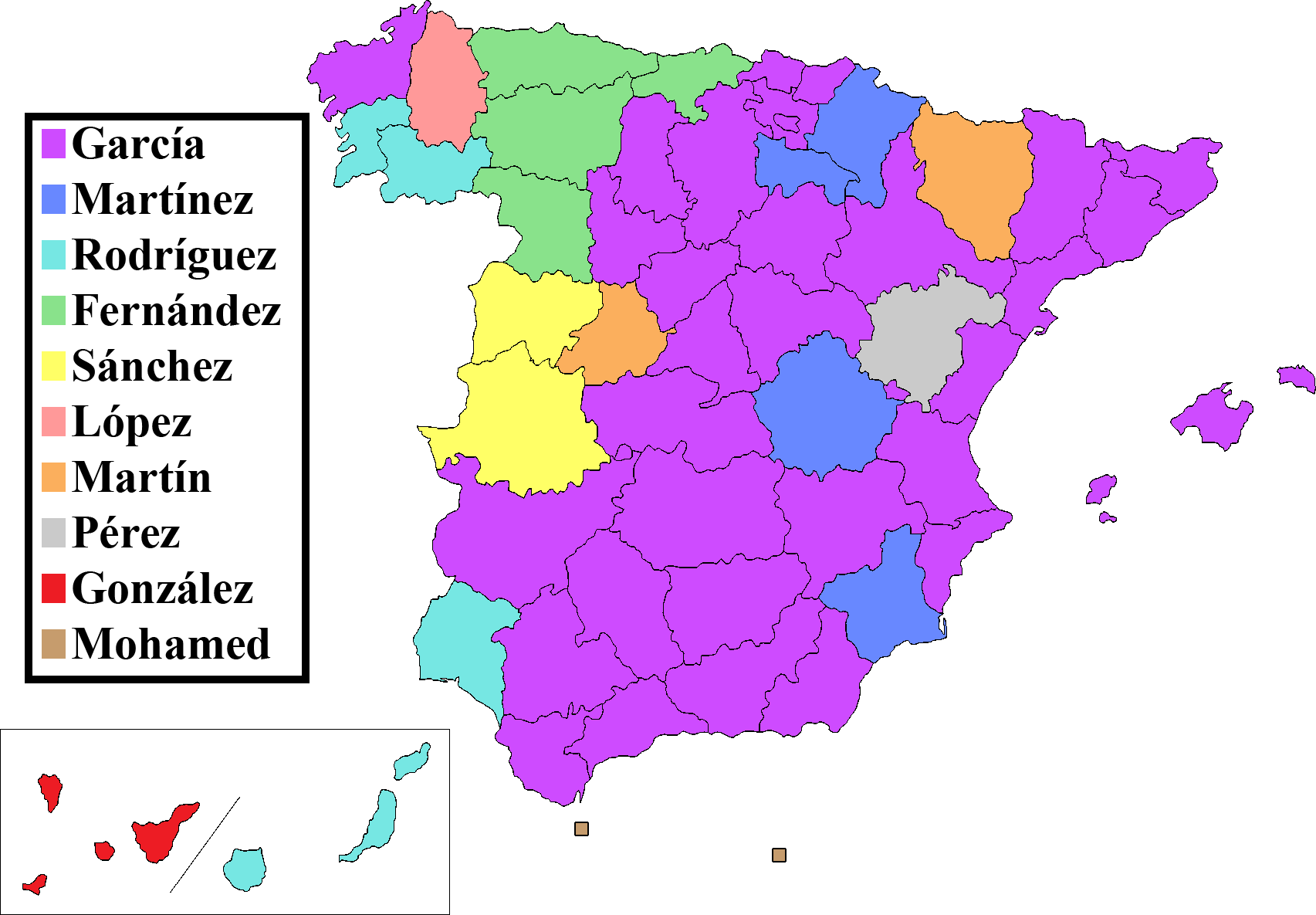
Most common surname in Spain by province of residence

García is the most common surname in Spain (where 3.32% of the population is named García) and also the second most common surname in Mexico.

In the 1990 United States Census, Garcia was the 18th most reported surname, accounting for 0.25% of the population. It has become more common since then, jumping to eighth place in 2000.

Garcia was quite rare before the First World War in France, except in the French Pays Basque, but became the 14th most common surname in France (and the eighth for the number of births between 1966 and 1990) due to Spanish immigration. It ranked second in the region Provence-Alpes-Côte d'Azur for the number of births 1966–1990.

== Geographical distribution ==
As of 2014, 33.2% of all known bearers of the surname García were residents of Mexico (frequency 1:35), 14.1% of Spain (1:31), 8.4% of the United States (1:402), 6.0% of Colombia (1:74), 4.6% of Venezuela (1:62), 4.4% of Brazil (1:435), 4.1% of the Philippines (1:230), 3.9% of Guatemala (1:39), 3.0% of Argentina (1:134), 2.8% of Cuba (1:38), 2.8% of Peru (1:105), 1.8% of Ecuador (1:83), 1.7% of Honduras (1:48), 1.5% of the Dominican Republic (1:64), 1.4% of Nicaragua (1:41), 1.2% of El Salvador (1:47) and 1.1% of France (1:576).

In Spain, the frequency of the surname was higher than average (1:31) in the following regions:

- Asturias (1:16)
- Castile and León (1:20)
- Region of Murcia (1:22)
- Castilla–La Mancha (1:24)
- Andalusia (1:29)
- Community of Madrid (1:29)
- Cantabria (1:29)
- Canary Islands (1:30)

In Mexico, the frequency of the surname was higher than average (1:35) in the following states:

- Oaxaca (1:22)
- Tabasco (1:27)
- Michoacán (1:28)
- Guerrero (1:30)
- Tamaulipas (1:30)
- State of Mexico (1:31)
- Coahuila (1:32)
- Veracruz (1:33)
- Jalisco (1:33)
- Nuevo León (1:33)
- Mexico City (1:34)
- Guanajuato (1:34)
- Morelos (1:34)

== Notable people ==
=== A ===
- Aaron Garcia (disambiguation), multiple people
- Adam Garcia (born 1973), Australian actor
- Adolis García (born 1993), Cuban baseball player
- Adrián García (disambiguation)
- Aimee Garcia (born 1978), Mexican American actress
- Aimeé García Marrero (born 1972), Cuban painter and mixed media artist
- Akeem Garcia (born 1996), Trinidadian footballer
- Alan García (disambiguation)
- Alejandro García (disambiguation), multiple people
- Alesia Garcia (born 2000), American soccer player
- Alex Garcia (disambiguation), multiple people
- Alfredo García (disambiguation)
- Alley Garcia (died 2012), Belizean shooting victim
- Amadeo García (1887–1947), Spanish football manager
- Ana García (disambiguation)
- Anastasio Somoza García (1896–1956), President of Nicaragua
- Andrés García (disambiguation)
- Anier García (born 1976), Cuban athlete in the 2000 Summer Olympics
- Antonio García (disambiguation), multiple people
- Aramis Garcia (born 1993), American baseball player
- Avisaíl García (born 1991), Venezuelan baseball player
- Awilda Villarini-Garcia (born 1940), Puerto Rican composer and pianist

=== B ===
- Bartolomé García del Nodal (1574–1622), Spanish explorer
- Bebel García García (1914–1936), Spanish footballer and politician
- Benjamin Garcia (disambiguation)
- Bianca Garcia, member of the New Hampshire House of Representatives
- Boniek García (born 1984), Honduran footballer
- Bonnie Garcia, Representative of California's 80th Assembly District
- Brenna Garcia (born 2004), Filipina child actress
- Brie Garcia (born 1983) American twin pro-wrestler known as Brie Bella
- Borja García (disambiguation), several people
- Bruno Garcia (disambiguation), several people
- Bryan Garcia (disambiguation), several people

=== C ===
- Calixto García (1839–1898), Cuban military leader
- Caloy Garcia (born 1975), Filipino basketball coach
- Cancio Garcia (1937–2013), Filipino lawyer and judge
- Candelario Garcia (1944–2013), United States Army Medal of Honor recipient
- Carlos Garcia (disambiguation), multiple people
- Carmelo Garcia, American politician from New Jersey
- Carmen García (disambiguation)
- Caroline Garcia (born 1993), French professional tennis player
- Cecilia García (disambiguation)
- Cédric Garcia (born 1982), French-Spanish rugby player
- Ceferino Garcia (1912–1981), Filipino boxer
- Charles García (born 1988), American-born Belizean basketball player
- Charles Patrick Garcia (born 1961), Panamanian-American author, Hispanic leader, businessman
- Chela Garcia Irlando, American politician
- Christian García (disambiguation)
- Clotilde García Borrero (1887–1969), Colombian suffragist, writer
- Coleen Garcia (born 1992), Filipina actress, host and model
- Concha García (disambiguation)
- Cosme García Sáez (1818–1874), Spanish inventor
- Cristina García (disambiguation), multiple people
- Cristino Garcia (1914–1946), Spanish fighter with the French Resistance during World War II

=== D ===
- Dámaso García (1957–2020), Dominican baseball player
- Danay Garcia, Cuban actress
- Daniel García (disambiguation), multiple people
- Danna García (born 1978), Colombian actress and singer
- Dante Garcia (born 1971), Filipino politician
- Daryanne Lees Garcia (born 1986), Cuban-Puerto Rican model and beauty queen
- David Garcia (disambiguation)
- Dean Garcia, British studio musician, former member of rock band Curve
- Dermis García (born 1998), Dominican baseball player
- Destra Garcia (born 1978), Trinidadian soca singer
- Diana Garcia (disambiguation), multiple people
- Diego Garcia (disambiguation), multiple people
- Dolores García (disambiguation)
- Domingo García (disambiguation)
- Dora García (born 1965), Spanish artist

=== E ===
- Eddie Garcia (1929–2019), Filipino film actor and director
- Edgar García (disambiguation)
- Eduardo García (disambiguation)
- Elijah Garcia (born 1998), American football player
- Eric Garcia (disambiguation), multiple people
- Erica Garcia (born 1978), Argentine musician and actress
- Ernesto García (1884–1955), Mexican soldier and politician
- Esmeralda de Jesus Garcia (born 1959), Brazilian track and field athlete
- Esperança Garcia (born c. 1751), an enslaved Afro-Brazilian and likely Creole woman in Brazil
- Esperanza García (1975–2025), Spanish lawyer and politician
- Esther García, Spanish film producer and production supervisor
- Esther Herranz García (born 1969), Spanish politician, Member of the European Parliament
- Esteban Garcia (born 1984), Argentine footballer

=== F ===
- Federico García (disambiguation)
- Felipe Garcia (disambiguation), multiple people
- Fernando García (disambiguation), multiple people
- Francesca Marie Velasco Garcia (born 1980), Filipino actress
- Francisco García (disambiguation), multiple people
- Frank Garcia (disambiguation), multiple people
- Franklin Garcia (born 1969), American politician
- Franklin García Fermín (born 1957), Dominican jurist and professor
- Freddy García (disambiguation), multiple people

=== G ===
- Gabriel García (disambiguation), multiple people
- Gael García Bernal (born 1978), Mexican actor
- Gary Garcia, half of the musical duo Buckner & Garcia
- Gastón García (born Darío Osvaldo Gastón García Aguilar in 1968), Argentine Olympic judoka
- Gazzy Garcia (born 2000), American rapper known professionally as Lil Pump
- Genaro García (boxer) (1977–2013), Mexican boxer
- Gilberto García (disambiguation), multiple people
- Gildardo García (1954–2021), Colombian chess player
- St. Gonsalo Garcia (1556–1597), Portuguese-Indian Roman Catholic saint
- Gonzalo Garcia (disambiguation), multiple people
- Guillermo Garcia (disambiguation), multiple people
- Gustavo García (disambiguation)
- Gwendolyn Garcia (born 1955), Filipino politician, governor of Cebu from 2004 to 2013, and since 2019

=== H ===
- Héctor García (disambiguation), multiple people
- Herminio Díaz García, Cuban exile
- Humberto García (disambiguation), multiple people

=== I ===
- Ibn Gharsiya, Andalusi writer
- Iolanda García Sàez, Spanish ski mountaineer
- Inez García (1941–2003), American feminist
- Iratxe García, Spanish politician, Member of the European Parliament
- Isaac García (born 1968), Mexican long-distance runner
- Isabela Garcia (born 1967), Brazilian actress
- Israel García (disambiguation)
- Iván García (disambiguation), multiple people

=== J ===
- Jacalyn Lopez Garcia (born 1953), American artist
- Jacques Garcia, French designer
- Jaime García (disambiguation), multiple people
- Jake Garcia, American racing driver
- Jarlin García (born 1993), Dominican baseball player
- Jarren Garcia (born 2006), Filipino-British model
- Jason Garcia, American professional baseball player
- Javier García (disambiguation), multiple people
- Jean Garcia, Filipino telenovela actress
- Jean-Louis Garcia (born 1962), French soccer player
- Jeff Garcia (born 1970), NFL and former Canadian football player of Irish and Mexican descent
- Jeff Garcia (comedian) (1975–2025), American actor and stand-up comedian
- Jennica Garcia, Filipino actress
- Jerry Garcia (1942–1995), American rock-and-roll musician (Grateful Dead)
- Jessica García (disambiguation)
- Jesús García (disambiguation), multiple people
- JoAnna Garcia (born 1979), American actress
- Joaquín García (disambiguation), multiple people
- John Garcia (disambiguation), multiple people
- Jonathan Garcia (born 1986), American former speed skater and ice hockey coach
- Jonathan Aguilar Garcia (1972–2019), Filipino comedian, actor, and TV host, better known by his stage name Chokoleit
- Jorge Garcia (born 1979), Hispanic American actor
- José García (disambiguation), multiple people
- Joseph Garcia (disambiguation), multiple people
- Josephine Garcia, American politician
- Joshua García (disambiguation)
- Juan Garcia (disambiguation), multiple people
- Julián García Centeno (born 1933), Spanish-born Peruvian Roman Catholic bishop
- Julio García (disambiguation), multiple people

=== K ===
- Kathryn Garcia (born 1970), Commissioner of the New York City Sanitation Department
- Kilmar Abrego Garcia (born 1995), citizen of El Salvador illegally deported from the United States
- Kyla Garcia, American actress

=== L ===
- Léa Garcia (1933–2023), Brazilian actress
- Leury García (born 1991), Dominican baseball player
- Levi García (born 1997), Trinidadian football player
- Lidia García (born 1989), Spanish researcher, activist, and podcaster
- Lilian Garcia (born 1966), Spanish-American singer and former WWE ring announcer
- Luis García (disambiguation), multiple people

=== M ===
- Macarena García (born 1988), Spanish actress
- Maikel García (born 2000), Venezuelan baseball player
- Mannie Garcia, American freelance photojournalist
- Manolo García, Spanish singer and painter
- Manolo García (make-up artist), Spanish make-up artist
- Manuel García (disambiguation), multiple people
- Marcario Garcia (1920–1972), Mexican-born United States Medal of Honor winner
- Marcela Bovio García (born 1979), Mexican singer, lead vocalist of the metal band Stream of Passion
- Marcelo García (disambiguation), multiple people
- Márcio Garcia (born 1970), Brazilian actor, television host, writer, producer and film director
- Maria Garcia (disambiguation), multiple people
- Marilinda Garcia, member of the New Hampshire House of Representatives
- Marina García (disambiguation)
- Marta García (disambiguation), multiple people
- Martín García (disambiguation), multiple people
- Mateo García de los Reyes (1872–1936), Spanish admiral and minister of the navy, organizer and first chief of the Spanish Navy Submarine Force
- Mauricio Garcia (1989–2023), American mass shooter
- Mayra García (born 1972), Mexican beach volleyball player
- Mayte Jannell Garcia (born 1973), Puerto Rican-American dancer
- Melani García (born 2007), Spanish classical singer
- Miguel García (disambiguation), multiple people
- Michael Garcia (disambiguation), multiple people
- Mireia García (born 1981), Spanish butterfly swimmer
- Mónica García (disambiguation)

=== N ===
- Natalie Garcia (disambiguation)
- Néstor García (disambiguation), multiple people
- Nieves García Vicente (born 1955), Spanish chess master
- Nick Garcia (born 1979), Mexican American soccer player
- Nicole Garcia (disambiguation)
- Nina García (born 1967), Colombian fashion journalist and critic
- Nubya Garcia (born 1991), British jazz saxophonist, composer and bandleader

=== O ===
- Odalys Garcia (born 1975), Cuban-American actress and television show host
- Oscar García (disambiguation)
- Oskar Matute García de Jalón (born 1972), Basque politician
- Orlando Garcia (disambiguation), multiple people

=== P ===
- Pablo Garcia (disambiguation), multiple people
- Paloma García (disambiguation)
- Patricia García (disambiguation)
- Patrick Garcia (born 1981), Filipino actor
- Pedro Garcia (disambiguation), multiple people
- Pete Garcia, athletic director of Florida International University
- Pierre Garcia (1943–2023), French football player and manager
- Pierre-Emmanuel Garcia (born 1983), French rugby player
- Pilar García (disambiguation), multiple people

=== R ===
- Radamel García (1957–2019), Colombian footballer
- Rafael García (disambiguation), multiple people
- Ramón García (disambiguation), multiple people
- Raúl García (disambiguation), multiple people
- Rebecca Garcia (disambiguation), multiple people
- Renaud Garcia-Fons (born 1962), French upright-bass player and composer
- Ricardo Garcia (disambiguation), multiple people
- Richard Garcia (born 1981), Australian soccer player
- Richard Garcia (shooting victim) (died 2017), Belizean villager
- Rick Garcia, American politician
- Rick Garcia (activist) (1956–2026), American LGBTQ rights activist
- Rico Garcia (born 1994), American baseball player
- Robel García (born 1993), Dominican baseball player
- Robert Garcia (disambiguation), multiple people
- Roberto García (disambiguation), multiple people
- Rodrigo García (disambiguation), multiple people
- Rómulo García (1927–2005), Archbishop of Bahía Blanca, Argentina
- Rony García (born 1997), Dominican baseball player
- Rosman García (born 1979), Venezuelan-American baseball player
- Ruben Garcia (disambiguation), multiple people
- Rudi Garcia (born 1964), French football manager
- Ryan Garcia (disambiguation)

=== S ===
- Salvador García (disambiguation), multiple people
- Sara García (disambiguation)
- Saúl García (disambiguation), multiple people
- Sergent Garcia, stage name of Bruno Garcia (born 1964), French solo artist
- Sergio García (disambiguation)
- Stéphane Garcia (born 1991), Swiss footballer
- Stephanie Garcia (born 1988), American athlete
- Sylvia Garcia (born 1950), U.S. Representative from Texas

=== T ===
- Tanya Garcia (disambiguation)
- Thea Garcia-Ramirez, Belizean women's rights activist and politician
- Tony Garcia (disambiguation), multiple people

=== V ===
- Valerie Pablo Garcia-Birchmore (born 1987), Filipino actress
- Vanessa García (born 1984), Puerto Rican freestyle swimmer
- Victor Garcia (disambiguation), multiple people
- Vincent Garcia (disambiguation)

=== W ===
- Willis García (born 1970), Venezuelan judoka
- Winston Garcia (born 1958), Filipino politician and lawyer

=== X ===
- Xavier García (disambiguation), multiple people

=== Y ===
- Yimi García (born 1990), Dominican baseball player
- Ylona Garcia (born 2002), Filipino-Australian actress, singer, and model
- Yohan García (born 1982), Cuban swimmer
- Yordanis García (born 1988), Cuban decathlete
- Yusmely García (born 1983), Venezuelan hurdler

== Fictional characters ==
- Isabella Garcia-Shapiro in Phineas and Ferb
- Juan García Cortes, in the video game Grand Theft Auto: Vice City
- Penelope Garcia in the crime drama Criminal Minds
- Robert Garcia, in the Art of Fighting and King of Fighters video game series
- Sergeant García, from Johnston McCulley's Zorro franchise
- Antonio Garcia, in the television show Power Rangers: Samurai
- Dr. Che Garcia, the main antagonist in the video game Last Alert
- Dr. Yolanda Garcia, in the television show The Pitt

== See also ==
- García (disambiguation)
- Garzia (name)
