= Angel Garcia =

Angel Garcia may refer to:

== Sports ==
- Angel García (baseball) (born 1923), Cuban baseball player
- Ángel García (basketball, born 1941), basketball player
- Ángel García (basketball, born 1988), basketball player
- Ángel García (footballer, born 1976), Mexican football manager and former defender
- Ángel García (footballer, born 1993), Spanish football winger
- Ángel García (footballer, born 2000), Mexican football midfielder
- Ángel García (pole vaulter) (born 1967), Cuban pole vaulter
- Angel García (rower) (born 1986), Uruguayan rower
- Angel García (sprinter) (1919–1996), Cuban sprinter

== Others ==
- Ángel García Cardona (1856–1923), Spanish film pioneer, directed El ciego de la aldea
- Ángel García Díaz (1873–1954), Spanish sculptor, works displayed at the Pantheon of the Duchess of Sevillano
- Ángel García Hernández (1899–1930), Spanish soldier
- Angel García de Jesús (fl. 1993–2013), Puerto Rican politician, mayor of Yabucoa
- Ángel García López (1935–2024), Spanish poet, National Poetry Award (Spain) in 1973
- Ángel García Peña (1856–1928), Mexican major general
- Ángel García Yáñez (born 1967), Mexican politician
- Angelo Garcia (born 1976), Puerto Rican singer and songwriter
- Ángel Matos García, Puerto Rican politician

== Fictional ==
- Angel Garcia, a character in the TV series Mercy
- Angel Garcia, a character in the film Key Largo

== See also ==
- Miguel Ángel García (disambiguation)
