= Nito =

Nito might refer to:

== People ==
=== Footballers ===
- Nito (footballer, born 1933), real name Joaquín García Paredes, Spanish footballer
- Nito (footballer, born 1934), real name Juan Álvarez Romero, Spanish footballer
- Nito (footballer, born 1939), real name Fernando García Paredes, Spanish footballer
- Ñito (born 1939), real name Cipriano Antonio González Rivero, Spanish footballer
- Nito (footballer, born 1967), real name Adelino da Rocha Vieira, Portuguese footballer

=== Others ===
- Nito Alves, Angolan politician
- Nito Cortizo, Panamanian politician
- Nito Mestre, Argentine musician
- Nito Simonsen, Norwegian rower
- Nito Gomes (born 2002), Bissau-Guinean footballer

== Other ==
- Nito (Maya site), historical trading post
- Norwegian Society of Engineers and Technologists
