= Carlos Garcia =

Carlos Garcia may refer to:

== Arts and entertainment ==
- Carlos Garcia (actor), appeared in Betão Ronca Ferro
- Carlos García Gual (born 1943), Spanish writer, member of the Real Academia Española
- Carlos García-Hirschfeld (born 1964), Spanish journalist and TV presenter
- Carlos García López (1958–2014), Argentine guitarist and musician
- Carlos García (pianist) (1914–2006), Argentine pianist and composer
- Carlos García-Vaso (born 1953), Spanish musician, member of Azul y Negro
- Charly García (born 1951), Argentine rock star

== Business ==
- Carlos García Ottati (born 1983), Venezuelan entrepreneur
- Carlos M. García (born 1971), Puerto Rican banker

== Government and politics ==
- Carlos García Adanero (born 1967), Spanish politician
- Carlos García-Bedoya Zapata (1925–1980), Peruvian diplomat, minister of foreign affairs in 1979
- Carlos García Carbayo (born 1962), Spanish politician
- Carlos García y García (1927–2016), Peruvian politician and pastor
- Carlos García Orjuela (born 1949), Colombian politician, elected to the Senate in 2006
- Carlos García Portela (1921–2011), Puerto Rican politician and senator
- Carlos Alberto García González (born 1971), Mexican politician
- Carlos Andrés García (politician) (c. 1973–2017), Venezuelan politician
- Carlos P. Garcia (1896–1971), Filipino poet and politician, president in 1957–1961
- Carlos M. García Zambrana (born 1983), Puerto Rican politician

== Military ==
- Carlos García del Postigo (1786–1852), Chilean infantry and naval officer, participated in the Gran Colombia–Peru War
- Carlos García Vallejo (1892–1949), Spanish army officer, participated in the coup of March 1939
- Carlos García Vélez (1867–1963), Cuban army general and diplomat

== Sportspeople ==
=== Association football ===
- Carlos Garcia (American soccer) (fl. 1988–1998), American soccer midfielder
- Carlos García Cambón (1949–2022), Argentine football manager and former striker
- Carlos García Cantarero (born 1961), Spanish football manager
- Carlos García-Die (born 2000), Spanish football defender
- Carlos García (Chilean footballer) (1902–1988)
- Carlos García (footballer, born 1957), Mexican football midfielder
- Carlos García (footballer, born 1970), Spanish football centre-back and midfielder
- Carlos García (footballer, born 1971), Venezuelan football defender
- Carlos García (footballer, born 1977), Venezuelan football forward
- Carlos García (footballer, born 1978), Ecuadorian football forward
- Carlos García (footballer, born 1979), Uruguayan football centre-back
- Carlos García (footballer, born 1981), Colombian football defender
- Carlos García (footballer, born 1984), Spanish football centre-back
- Carlos García (footballer, born 1993), Spanish football midfielder
- Carlos García (Swedish footballer) (born 1993), Swedish football defender
- Carlitos (footballer, born 1982) (Carlos Alberto Alves Garcia), Portuguese football winger
- Carlos Aitor García (born 1984), Spanish football manager

=== Other sports ===
- Carlos García (baseball) (born 1967), Venezuelan Major League Baseball player
- Carlos García Solórzano (1931–2014), Nicaraguan baseball executive and promoter
- Carlos García (cyclist) (born 1964), Uruguayan Olympic cyclist
- Carlos Garcia (fighter), mixed martial artist, fought Doug Marshall
- Carlos García (gymnast) (born 1942), Cuban gymnast
- Carlos Garcia Palermo (born 1953), Argentine chess master
- Carlos García Pierna (born 1999), Spanish road racing cyclist
- Carlos García Quesada (cyclist) (born 1978), Spanish road racing cyclist
- Carlos García (runner) (born 1975), Spanish distance runner
- Caloy Garcia (born 1975), Filipino basketball player and coach
