= Joaquín García =

Joaquín García may refer to:

== Arts and entertainment ==
- Joaquín García de Antonio (1710–1779), Spanish composer
- Joaquín García Monge (1881–1958), Costa Rican novelist
- Joaquín Riquelme García (born 1983), Spanish viola soloist

== Sports ==
- Chano García (Joaquín García, born 1903), Cuban baseball player
- Nito (footballer, born 1933) (Joaquín García Paredes, born 1933), Spanish footballer
- Joaquín García Benavides (born 1962), Costa Rican slalom canoer
- Joaquín García (footballer, born 1986), Spanish footballer
- Joaquín García (footballer, born 1875), Spanish footballer

== Others ==
- Joaquín García (politician) (fl. 1829–1839), governor of Nuevo León
- Joaquín García Icazbalceta (1824–1894), Mexican philologist and historian
- Joaquín García Borrero (1894–1948), Colombian engineer, politician, senator, historian and writer
- Joaquín García Morato (1904–1939), Nationalist fighter ace of the Spanish Civil War
- Joaquín "Jack" García (born 1952), Cuban-American retired FBI agent
