= Garcia-Colace =

Garcia-Colace, Garcia Colace, Garcia y Colace, or, variant, may refer to:

- The Bella Twins, Garcia-Colace twins sisters pro-wrestling team of Brie and Nikki
- Brianna Monique Garcia-Colace (born 1983) twin pro-wrestler Brie Bella
- Stephanie Nicole Garcia-Colace (born 1983) twin pro-wrestler Nikki Bella

== See also ==
- Colace (disambiguation)
- Garcia (disambiguation)
