= Miguel Ángel García =

Miguel Ángel García or variation, may refer to:

García as single surname:

- Miguel Ángel García (boxer) (born 1987), Mexican American boxer
- Miguel Ángel García (wrestler) (born 1960), Spanish wrestler

García as first surname:

- Miguel Ángel García Domínguez (1931–2015), Mexican politician
- Miguel Ángel García Granados (born 1952), Mexican politician
- Miguel Ángel García Martín (born 1978), Spanish politician
- Miguel Angel García Méndez (1902–1998), Puerto Rican politician
- Miguel Angel García Pérez-Roldán (born 1981), Spanish soccer player
- Miguel Ángel García Tébar (born 1979), Spanish soccer player

García as second surname:

- Miguel Ángel Ruiz García (born 1955), Spanish footballer

== See also ==
- Miguel García (disambiguation)
- Angel Garcia (disambiguation)
- Miguel Angel García Méndez Post Office Building, Mayaguez, Puerto Rico
