= Rafa García =

Rafa García may refer to:

- Rafa García (footballer)
- Rafa García (fighter)
- Rafa García (basketball)

== See also ==
- Rafael García (disambiguation)
