= Alexandre Garcia =

Alexandre Garcia may refer to:

- Alexandre Cardoso Garcia (born 1992), Brazilian football midfielder
- Alexandre Garcia (footballer) (born 1988), French football forward
- Alexandre Garcia (journalist), Brazilian broadcaster for Bom Dia Brasil and Jornal Nacional
- Alexandre García (judoka) (born 1972), Brazilian Olympic judoka
- Alexandre Garcia Ribeiro (born 1984), Brazilian football striker

== See also ==
- Alex García (disambiguation)
