= José García =

Jose Garcia or José García may refer to:

== Sports ==
=== Association football ===
- José García Pérez (footballer) (1921–?), Argentine football defender
- José García (Uruguayan footballer) (1926–2011), Uruguayan football midfielder
- José García (Chilean footballer) (1931–2013), Chilean footballer
- José García Castro (1933–2003), known as Pepillo, Spanish footballer
- José María García-Aranda (born 1956), Spanish football referee
- José Enrique García (born 1967), Uruguayan footballer
- José Mari García (born 1971), Spanish football midfielder
- José Daniel García (born 1985), Mexican football defender
- José García (footballer, born 1995), Mexican footballer
- José García (footballer, born 1996), Mexican football defender
- José García (footballer, born 1997), Spanish football midfielder
- José García (Honduran footballer) (born 1998)

=== Baseball ===
- José García (pitcher, born 1981), Cuban baseball pitcher
- José García (pitcher, born 1985), Dominican baseball pitcher
- José García (shortstop) (born 1998), Cuban baseball shortstop

=== Other sportspeople ===
- José García (sprinter) (1900-unknown), Spanish sprinter
- José García (boxer) (born 1968), Venezuelan boxer
- José Garcia (canoeist) (born 1964), Portuguese sprint canoer
- José García (field hockey) (born 1952), Spanish hockey player
- José García (runner) (1946–2023), Mexican Olympic runner
- José García (weightlifter) (born 1960), Ecuadorian Olympic weightlifter
- José Amado García (born 1977), Guatemalan long-distance runner
- José Manuel García (runner) (born 1966), retired Spanish long-distance runner
- José Vicente García (born 1972), Spanish professional road bicycle racer

== Government, politics and law ==
- José García de León y Pizarro (1770–1835), Spanish politician
- José Manuel García Bedoya (fl. 1930s), Peruvian politician
- José Antonio García Belaúnde (1948–2025), Peruvian diplomat and politician
- José Andreu García (1937–2019), American Puerto Rican jurist
- José García Hernández (1915–2000), Spanish politician and journalist
- José García Ladrón de Guevara (1929–2019), Spanish politician and journalist
- José García Pérez (politician)

== Arts and entertainment ==
- José García Villa (1908–1997), Filipino writer
- José García Nieto (1914–2001), Spanish poet
- José Ros García (1920–2001), Spanish-born poet who lived and worked for part of his life in Australia
- José García Román (born 1945), Spanish composer
- José Luis García-López (born 1948), Spanish comic-book artist
- José Garcia (actor) (born 1966), French-Spanish actor
- Jose Garcia (game designer), founder of Daedalus Entertainment
- José C. Garcia de Letona, Mexican producer and co-founder of Ánima Estudios
- José Maurício Nunes Garcia (1767–1830), Brazilian classical composer

== Other ==
- José García González (1938–2020), Spanish psychiatrist and neurologist
- José Guillermo García (born 1933), Salvadoran soldier
- José Juan García (1940–2002), founder of the international institution Hogares Crea

== See also ==
- José Luis García (disambiguation)
- José Miguel García, several people
- José Antonio García (disambiguation)
