= Gabriel García =

Gabriel or Gabe García may refer to:

- Gabriël Garcia (1903–1970), Spanish cyclist
- Gabriel García-Badell (1936–1994), Spanish writer
- Gabriel García Fernández (born 1999), Puerto Rican volleyball player
- Gabriel García Hernández (born 1977), Mexican politician, elected in 2024 for the 18th federal electoral district of Mexico City
- Gabriel García Moreno (1821–1876), 7th president of Ecuador
- Gabriel García Márquez (1927–2014), Colombian novelist, journalist, publisher, and political activist
- Gabriel García Román (born 1973), Mexican-American photographer and visual artist
- Gabriel Garcia Xatart (born 1988), Spanish football manager
- Gabriel Garcia, lead singer of U.S. group Black Tide
- Gabe Garcia, U.S. reality television contender, runner up on season 6 of Nashville Star
- Gabe Garcia (born 1970), American soccer forward
- Gabri (footballer, born 1979), born Gabriel Francisco García de la Torre, Spanish retired footballer

== See also ==
- José Gabriel García (1834–1910), Dominican army officer, politician, and journalist
- Gabbi Garcia (born 1998), Filipino actress and host
- Gabi Garcia (born 1985), Brazilian Jiu-Jitsu practitioner and mixed martial artist from Brazil
