= Fatima Jamal =

American artist

- Born: Atlanta, Georgia, U.S.
- Other name: FatFemme
- Education: Morehouse College; The New School
- Occupations: Filmmaker, model, interdisciplinary artist
- Known for: No Fats, No Femmes, Pose
- Website: fatimajamal.com

Fatima Jamal is an American filmmaker, model, writer, and interdisciplinary artist. A Black transgender woman who goes by the moniker "Fat Femme," Jamal is also an activist who speaks and makes art about social issues including racism, body positivity, and LGBTQ rights.

== Biography ==
Jamal was born in Atlanta, Georgia and attended Morehouse College. She completed a graduate program at The New School, where she studied documentary filmmaking. Jamal underwent her gender transition after finishing graduate school. She credits her move from Atlanta to New York City as giving her the opportunity to thrive.

== Career ==
About her art, Jamal has said, "My art really focuses on a black, queer, femme experience because those are all things that I'm interested in. I will never grow tired of capturing black, queer, and trans people and excavating our histories."

=== Acting and modeling ===
Jamal has modeled on runways at New York Fashion Week, is a fixture of the ballroom scene, and has appeared in the TV show Pose. She was the first black trans model to walk the runway for a major menswear fashion house, for Stefano Pilati's unisex line in fall 2020.

Jamal starred in Tourmaline's film Atlantic is a Sea Bones (2017), which takes its title from an eponymous poem by Lucille Clifton. The film concerns black queer history in New York City.

=== Directorial work ===
In 2020, Jamal began a crowdfunding campaign on the website Indiegogo to support a documentary, No Fats, No Femmes, that Jamal is writing and directing. According to her fundraising campaign, the film "examines and troubles how the gazes of others — particularly dominant white gazes — inform how we see ourselves and each other. In it, I center and am fascinated by my own Black, fat body as a site of criticism; and, an invitation inward, toward self — often, a self un-done, vulnerable, and terrifying." As of September 2020, the campaign had raised more than $55,000. The project was featured in Artforum in July 2020.

== Legacy ==
Jamal has been cited as a source of inspiration by other contemporary artists. Gabriel Garcia Román's “Queer Icons” series of paintings (started in 2011), which honors queer activists and artists, includes a portrait of Jamal.
