= The Cliff Hotel & Spa =

Hotel in Negril, Jamaica

General information
- Location: West End Road, Negril, Westmoreland Parish, Jamaica
- Opening: December 2015
- Owner: The Cliff Hotel & Spa LTD

Other information
- Number of rooms: 26
- Number of suites: 6
- Number of restaurants: 1

Website
- thecliffjamaica.com

The Cliff Hotel & Spa is a boutique hotel on the cliffs of the West End of Negril, in Westmoreland Parish, Jamaica. It opened in December 2015 as The Cliff following the conversion of the former Moon Dance Cliffs resort, and took its present name after a 2025 change of ownership.

== History ==
=== Moon Dance Cliffs ===
The five acre property, on the cliffs past the lighthouse on West End Road, operated from about 2008 as Moon Dance Cliffs, a boutique resort with 15 rooms and suites, four villas, a spa, and a restaurant named Annie's.

=== The Cliff ===
In 2015 the resort was acquired and renovated at a cost of US$3 million by a group led by the Jamaican hotelier Mary Phillips, whose earlier career included management roles at Round Hill, the Jamaica Inn, and the Albion Hotel in Miami, together with the Miami investors Avra Jain of the Vagabond Group, Dalia Lagoa, and Joseph Del Vacchio. It reopened in December 2015 as The Cliff, with 33 suites in a main building and four cottages. Its restaurant, Zest, opened under the chef Cindy Hutson and the restaurateur Delius Shirley, both of Ortanique in Coral Gables, Florida; Shirley is a son of the Jamaican chef Norma Shirley. The hotel also opened with a spa, KiYara, whose treatments drew on Jamaican botanicals, and added a yoga pavilion and fitness centre in 2016.

In a 2020 review for The Daily Telegraph, Kaye Holland scored the hotel nine out of ten, noting a lobby decorated with art by the Venezuelan painter Benjamin Garcia.

Since 2022 the hotel has held the Gourmet Getaway, an annual food and wine event featuring visiting chefs alongside its kitchen.

=== The Cliff Hotel & Spa ===
In August 2025 the property was acquired by The Cliff Hotel & Spa LTD, a newly formed ownership group based in the United States, and was renamed The Cliff Hotel & Spa. By February 2026 the new owners had begun a US$20 million renovation covering a new kitchen, a redesigned restaurant, refreshed guestrooms, and plunge pools for the villas, with completion expected by the middle of 2026. As of 2026 the hotel comprised 16 guestrooms, six suites, and four villas of one to five bedrooms.

== Facilities ==
The hotel occupies five waterfront acres of ironshore cliffside. It has two pools, one freshwater and one seawater pool carved from the cliff rock, six sunset viewing platforms, the KiYara spa, and the yoga pavilion.
