= Ricky Garcia =

Ricky Garcia may refer to:

- Ricky García (footballer) (born 1971), Honduran footballer
- Ricky Garcia, German musician
- Ricky Garcia (actor), American actor and singer

== See also ==
- Ricardo Garcia (disambiguation)
