= Antonio García =

Antonio García or Anthony Garcia may refer to:

== Arts and entertainment ==
- Antonio García Reinoso (1623–1677), Spanish painter
- Antonio García Gutiérrez (1813–1884), Spanish Romantic dramatist
- Antonio López García (born 1936), Spanish artist
- Antonio García Vega (born 1954), Mexican artist

== Politics ==
- Antonio García Reyes (1817–1855), Chilean journalist, diplomat and politician
- Antonio García Quejido (1856–1927), Spanish politician and trade unionist
- Antonio García Barón (c. 1921–2008), Confederación Nacional del Trabajo member
- Antonio García-Trevijano (1927–2018), Spanish political activist and author
- Antonio García Torres (born 1943), Mexican politician
- Antonio García (ELN commander) (born 1956), nom de guerre of Colombian ELN commander Eliécer Erlington Chamorro Acosta
- Antonio García Conejo (born 1971), Mexican politician
- António Garcia Pereira (born 1952), Portuguese lawyer and politician

== Sports ==
=== Association football ===
- Antonio García (footballer, born 1940), Guatemalan football midfielder
- Antonio García Ameijenda (born 1948), Spanish football manager and former midfielder
- Antonio García Navajas (born 1958), Spanish football defender
- Antonio García Prieto (born 1964), Salvadoran manager and former defender
- Toño García (footballer, born 1989), Spanish football left-back
- Antonio García Márquez (born 1989), Spanish football midfielder
- Toni García (footballer, born 1991), Spanish football left-back
- Toño García (footballer, born 1992), Mexican football defender

=== Other sports ===
- Antonio María García (1868–1923), Cuban baseball catcher
- Antonio García (sport shooter) (1909–1993), Mexican Olympic shooter
- Antonio García (boxer) (1948–2015), Spanish Olympic boxer
- Antonio García Martínez (cyclist) (born 1956), Spanish cyclist
- Antonio García (fencer) (born 1964), Spanish Olympic fencer
- Antonio García (racing driver) (born 1980), Spanish racing driver
- Anthony Garcia (polo) (born 1981), Filipino American polo player
- Antonio García Robledo (born 1984), Spanish handball player
- Anthony García (born 1992), Puerto Rican baseball player
- Antonio Garcia (gridiron football) (born 1993), American football player

== Others ==
- Antonio García-Bellido (1936–2025), Spanish developmental biologist
- Antonio García López (criminal) (1943–1995), Puerto Rican criminal
- Antonio García Padilla (born 1954), Puerto Rican academic
- Anthony Garcia (terrorist) (fl. 2004), British terrorist arrested in Operation Crevice
- Antonio García Martínez (author), American tech author and entrepreneur
- Anthony Garcia (serial killer) (born 1973), American former doctor and convicted murderer

== See also ==
- Tony Garcia (disambiguation)
- José Antonio García (disambiguation)
