= Garzia (name) =

Garzia is the Italianized form of the Spanish name García. Notable people with the name include:

- Garzia de' Medici (1547–1562), the subject of a famous painting by Bronzino
- Eleonora di Garzia di Toledo (1553–1576), Italian nobility
- Giovanni Garzia Mellini (1562–1629), Italian prelate of the Catholic Church
- Francisco Fernando Garzia (1863-1917), Italian nobility, Argentina doctor
- Albert Garzia (born 1977), Maltese composer, musician and music teacher
- Ralph Garzia (1921–2009), American politician
