= Domingo García =

Domingo García may refer to:

- Domingo García, Segovia, a municipality in the province of Segovia, Spain
- Domingo García (footballer) (1904–?), Peruvian football midfielder
- Domingo García (fencer) (1895–?), Spanish fencer
- Domingo García (politician), Texas politician
- Saint Dominic de la Calzada (1019–1109), born Domingo García
- Domingo García Ramos (1911–1978), Mexican architect
