= José Luis García =

José Luis García may refer to:

- José Luis García Sánchez (born 1941), Spanish film director, screenwriter and producer
- José Luis Garci (José Luis García Muñoz, born 1944), Spanish director, producer, critic, TV presenter, screenwriter and author
- José Luis García-López (born 1948), Spanish comic book artist
- José Luis García Pérez (born 1972), Spanish film, television and theater actor
- José Luis García (footballer, born 1985), Argentine footballer
- José Luis García (footballer, born 1988), Colombian football manager and player
- Recio (footballer) (José Luis García del Pozo, born 1991), Spanish footballer
- José Luis García (baseball) [aka Chito] (1924–2015), Mexican baseball player and manager (Tigres de Quintana Roo)
- José Luis García (pitcher), Mexican baseball player (2009 Caribbean Series)
- Pepelu (José Luis García Vayá, born 1998), Spanish footballer
- José Luis García (wrestler), Guatemala Olympic wrestler
- José Luis Miñano García (born 1987), Spanish footballer
- José Luis Senobua García (born 1978), Equatoguinean football manager and former player

== See also ==
- Jose Garcia (disambiguation)
