= Rodrigo García =

Rodrigo García may refer to:

- Rodrigo García (director) (born 1959), film and television director
- Rodrigo García (author) (born 1964), Argentinian author
- Rodrigo García Rena (born 1980), Spanish cyclist
- Rodrigo Garcia (politician) (born 1974), Brazilian politician

== See also ==
- García (surname)
