= Daniel García =

Daniel or Danny García may refer to:

== Entertainment ==
- Daniel Garcia (director) (born 1975), American music video and commercial director
- Daniel García Andújar (born 1966), visual media artist, activist, and art theorist from Spain
- Daniel Garcia (born 1995), Brazilian singer, drag queen and former voice actor, known professionally as Gloria Groove
- Member of filmmaking duo Rania Attieh and Daniel Garcia

== Sports ==
- Danny Garcia (outfielder) (born 1954), Kansas City Royals
- Danny Garcia (second baseman) (born 1980), New York Mets
- Danny Garcia (boxer) (born 1988), American boxer
- Daniel García González (born 1984), Andorran judoka
- Daniel García (racewalker) (born 1971), Mexican race walker
- Dani García (footballer, born 1974), Spanish footballer
- Dani García (footballer, born 1990), Spanish footballer
- Danny Garcia (soccer, born 1993) (born 1993), American soccer player
- Daniel Garcia Soto, ring name Stefano, wrestled in Puerto Rico
- Daniel Garcia, aka Huracán Ramírez (1926–2006), Mexican wrestler
- Daniel Garcia (wrestler) (born 1998), American wrestler

== Other ==
- Daniel E. Garcia (born 1960), American prelate of the Roman Catholic Church
- Daniel Garcia-Castellanos (born 1968), Spanish scientist
- Daniel García-Mansilla (1867–1957), Argentine diplomat
- Daniel García-Peña (born 1957), Colombian diplomat
- Danny Garcia (activist), American Christian peace activist and founder of Global Walk

== See also ==
- García (surname)
