= Stefano Pilati =

Italian fashion designer (born 1965)

- Born: 1965 (age 60–61); Milan, Lombardy, Italy
- Occupation: Fashion designer
- Known for: Creative director at Yves Saint Laurent fashion house (2004–2012); Head designer and creative director for Ermenegildo Zegna (2012–2016); Founder and creative director of Random Identities (2017–present)
- Website: randomidentities.com

Stefano Pilati (born December 10, 1965, in Milan) is an Italian fashion designer. In 2017, he founded Random Identities, a ready-to-wear brand.

From 2004 until 2012, Pilati was the head designer of Yves Saint Laurent. In late 2012 he left YSL to be head of design at Ermenegildo Zegna, where he was responsible for the Italian house's couture collections until February 2016. In tandem with that position, he also headed Zegna's Agnona brand (women's apparel) until July 2015.

== Early life ==
Pilati grew up in Milan.

== Career ==
Having seen his hometown grow into a fashion hotspot in the 1980s, Pilati gave up his course in environmental design and joined the fashion house Cerruti as an intern. He thus decided to embrace Milan's fashion scene and set out to learn everything there was to know about ready-to-wear apparel materials and production. A velvet manufacturer offered him his first job. A few months later, Pilati was designing that company's entire collection, and presenting it to Europe's leading ready-to-wear names.

The fashion house Giorgio Armani hired Pilati as an assistant in its men's ready-to-wear department in 1993. The fashion house Prada employed him to run its fabric research and development in 1995. In 1998 Prada promoted him to assistant designer at Miu Miu, working on men's and women's ready-to-wear clothing and reporting directly to Miuccia Prada.

=== Yves Saint Laurent, 2000–2012 ===
In 2000, Pilati joined fashion house Yves Saint Laurent to run its ready-to-wear and accessories design for both men's and women's; in 2004 Pilati succeeded Tom Ford in his role of Creative Director. During his tenure as head designer, Pilati was responsible for creating fashion staples such as the tulip skirt, as well as extremely successful accessories such as the Muse bag, and the YSL Tribute sandal. After eight years Pilati and the Kering Group parted ways and he left YSL in 2012.

While at YSL, Pilati re-introduced booking former top Models for YSL's ad-campaigns and worked with iconic photographers such as Juergen Teller and Inez Lamsweerde and Vinoodh Matadin. He also created a democratic form of street advertising publishing limited edition Manifesto(s). In addition to his work at YSL, he created costumes for the production of Harold Pinter's play Betrayal, which opened in June 2011 at the Comedy Theatre in London.

=== Zegna, 2012–2016 ===
In late 2012, Pilati signed on at Ermenegildo Zegna, becoming the head of design at Ermenegildo Zegna and creative director of Agnona, overseeing Zegna's fashion show and the couture collection. Zegna created a new label for him, Ermenegildo Zegna Couture. Pilati held his first Zegna Couture show during the Milan menswear collection in June 2013. In the following years, his catwalk collections were critically lauded but barely produced. In 2015, he left Agnona. By February 2016, he also stepped down from his role at Zegna.

=== Random Identities, 2017–present ===
In 2017, using his personal Instagram account, Pilati uploaded 17 looks from a new, self-started brand called Random Identities. In fall 2020, Fatima Jamal became the first black trans model to model for a major menswear house in the Random Identities show in Florence. Since then, Stefano Pilati works as Creative Director of his own brand, based between Berlin and Milan.

In 2023, Pilati was selected by Kim Jones and Silvia Venturini Fendi to design a collection for Fendi. In September 2024, Pilati began working with Zara on a capsule collection. The collaboration, which includes around 50 men's and 30 women's designs, as well as shoes and bags, was launched in October 2024. The collection was accompanied by a photo campaign shot by photographer Steven Meisel.

== Personal life ==
Pilati moved to Berlin with his partner in 2013.

== See also ==
- Italian fashion
- List of fashion designers
- List of Italian designers
- List of Milanese people
