= Pedro García =

Pedro García or Garcia may refer to:

== Artist and entertainers ==
- Pedro Flores García (1897–1967), Spanish painter
- Pedro García Cabrera (1905–1981), Spanish writer of the Generation of '27
- Pedro García Díaz (1938–2007), Colombian musician, songwriter, and lawyer

== Politicians ==
- Pedro Andrés García (1758–1833), Argentine military man
- Pedro Armendáriz García (born 1967), Mexican politician
- Pedro García Figueroa (born 1959), Puerto Rican politician and mayor of Hormigueros
- Pedro García de la Huerta Matte (1903–1994), Chilean academic and politician
- Pedro García Naranjo (1838–1917), Peruvian prelate of the Roman Catholic church

== Sportspeople ==
=== Association football ===
- Pedro García (footballer, born 1946), Chilean football manager and former midfielder
- Pedro García (footballer, born 1974), Peruvian football attacking midfielder
- Pedro García (footballer, born 2000), Peruvian football left-back

=== Other sports ===
- Pedro García (sport shooter) (1928–1980), Peruvian Olympic shooter
- Pedro García (boxer) (born 1932), Peruvian Olympic boxer
- Pedro García Toledo (born 1949), Peruvian chess master
- Pedro García (baseball) (born 1950), Puerto Rican major league baseball player
- Pedro García Jr. (born 1953), Peruvian Olympic shooter
- Pedro García (handballer) (born 1963), Spanish handball player
- Pedro García Aguado (born 1968), Spanish water-polo player

== Other uses ==
- Pedro García, Coamo, Puerto Rico, a barrio in the municipality of Coamo, Puerto Rico

== See also ==
- Pete Garcia (born 1961), athletic director
