= Felipe Garcia =

Felipe Garcia may refer to:

== People ==
- Felipe García (handballer) (born 1993), Chilean handball player
- Felipe Garcia (footballer, born 1988), Brazilian goalkeeper soccer player
- Felipe Garcia (footballer, born 1990), Brazilian midfielder soccer player
- Felipe Arturo Camarena Garcia (born 1956), Mexican politician
- Felipe Fernández García (1935–2012), Mexican-born Roman Catholic bishop
- Felipe Navarro García (1930–1994, nicknamed "Yale") Spanish journalist
- Felipe Tejeda García (1935–2018), Mexican-born Roman Catholic bishop
- Andrés Felipe Ibargüen García (born 1992), Colombian soccer player

=== Fictional characters ===
- Felipe "Cobra" García, a superpowered teen on the Mexican TV show Los elegidos (TV series)

== Other uses ==
- Felipe Garcia Store, Ponce, Puerto Rico, a building that housed the Ponce Historical Archive from 1995 to 2013
- Felipe Orlando García-Murciano Collection of Pre-Columbian art, housed at the Benalmádena Museum, Málaga, Spain

== See also ==
- García Felipe de Legazpi y Velasco Altamirano y Albornoz, (1643–1706) Roman Catholic bishop
- Felipe (disambiguation)
- Garcia (disambiguation)
