= Colace (disambiguation) =

Colace is the trade name for Docusate, the pharmaceutical compound dioctyl sulfosuccinate (DOSS), a laxative.

Colace may also refer to:

== People ==
- Hugo Colace (disambiguation), several people
- The Bella Twins (born 1983), the Garcia Colace twin sister pro-wrestlers
  - Brie Bella (born 1983, as Brianna Monique Garcia Colace) twin pro-wrestler
  - Nikki Bella (born 1983, as Stephanie Nicole Garcia Colace) twin pro-wrestler
- Kathy Colace, mother of The Bella Twins, wife of John Laurinaitis

== See also ==
- Lace (disambiguation)
