= Oscar García =

Oscar García may refer to:

== Politicians ==
- Óscar García Barrón (born 1959), Mexican politician
- Oscar García Rivera (1900–1969), Puerto Rican politician, lawyer and activist

== Musicians ==
- Oscar García Urrego (1942–2025), Colombian pianist, arranger, composer, and musical director

== Sportspeople ==
=== Footballers ===
- Óscar García (footballer, born 1973), Spanish former football midfielder and manager
- Óscar Boniek García (born 1984), Honduran former football midfielder
- Óscar García (footballer, born 1988), Spanish football striker
- Óscar García (footballer, born 1990), Honduran football midfielder
- Óscar García (footballer, born 2003), Mexican football goalkeeper

=== Other sports ===
- Oscar García (cyclist) (born 1941), Argentinian cyclist
- Oscar García (fencer) (born 1966), Cuban fencer
- Óscar García (canoeist) (born 1972), Spanish sprint canoer
- Óscar García (basketball) (born 1979), Spanish professional basketball player
- Oscar García (volleyball) (born 1995), Venezuelan volleyball player
- Oscar García (drummer), former drummer for Falling in Reverse
- Oscar Garcia (vocalist), American vocalist for Terrorizer and Nausea
