= Guillermo Garcia =

Guillermo Garcia may refer to:

- Guillermo García (actor) (born 1981), Venezuelan actor
- Guillermo García (swimmer) (born 1955), Mexican Olympic swimmer
- Guillermo García López (born 1983), Spanish tennis player and coach
- Guillermo García Oropeza (born 1937), Mexican writer
- Guillermo García (baseball) (born 1972), former Major League Baseball catcher
- Guillermo García (sailor) (born 1944), Mexican Olympic sailor
- Guillermo García (volleyball) (born 1983), Argentina national volleyballer
- Guillermo García (tennis), Chilean tennis player at the 1955 & 1956 US Open
- Guillermo García Cantú (born 1960), Mexican actor
- Guillermo García González (1953–1990), Cuban chess grandmaster
- Guillermo García (Salvadoran footballer) (born 1969), Salvadoran football player
- Guillermo García, model from Zaragoza; Mister Spain 2009
- Guillermo García (musician) (born 1988), Mexican guitarist for S7N
