= Pilar García =

Pilar García may refer to:

- Pilar García (brigadier general) (1896-unknown), Cuban Brigadier General and police chief
- Pilar García Negro (born 1953), Spanish politician and sociolinguist
- Pilar García Muñiz (born 1974), Spanish journalist
- Pilar García (footballer) (born 1990), Spanish footballer
- Pilar Giménez García (born 1982), Spanish singer, lead vocalist of the gothic metal band Sirenia
