= Joe Garcia (disambiguation) =

Joe Garcia may refer to:

- Joe Garcia, American politician, attorney, and lobbyist from Florida
- Joe A. Garcia, Native American leader from New Mexico
- Joe G. N. Garcia, American pulmonary scientist and physician
- Joey Garcia, American politician and attorney from West Virginia
- Joseph Garcia, American politician and former lieutenant governor of Colorado

== See also ==
- Joseph Garcia (disambiguation)
