= Benjamin Garcia (disambiguation) =

Benjamin Garcia (born 1993) is a French rugby league player.

Benjamin Garcia may also refer to:

- Benjamin Garcia (athlete) (1933–2015), American javelin thrower
- Benjamin A. Garcia (born 1976), American chemist
- Benjamin Garcia (painter) (born 1986), Venezuelan painter
- Benny Garcia, a character in Camp Half-Blood
