= Marcelo García =

Marcelo García or Marcelino García (little Marcelo) may refer to:

- Marcelo Garcia (grappler) (born 1983), Brazilian Jiu-Jitsu competitor and submission grappler
- Marcelo García Morales (born 1969), Mexican politician
- Marcelino García Toral (born 1965), Spanish football coach
- Marcelino García (cyclist) (born 1971), Spanish professional road bicycle racer

== See also ==
- Marcelo
- García (disambiguation)
