= Alejandro García =

Alejandro García may refer to:

- Alejandro García (boxer) (born 1979), Mexican boxer
- Alejandro García (footballer, born 1961), Mexican footballer
- Alejandro García (footballer, born 1984), Spanish footballer
- Alejandro García (soccer, born 1994), American soccer player
- Alejandro García Caturla (1906–1940), Cuban composer
- Alejandro García Padilla (born 1971), President of the Popular Democratic Party of Puerto Rico
- Alejandro García Reneses (born 1946), Spanish basketball coach
- Alejandro Alvarado García (1839–1922), Costa Rican politician
- Alejandro Robles García (born 1999), Spanish footballer
- Álex García (footballer, born 1970), Spanish footballer

== See also ==
- Alex García (disambiguation)
- Alejo García (disambiguation)
