= Ruben Garcia =

Ruben Garcia or Rubén García may refer to:

== Association football ==
- Rubén García (footballer, born 1980), Spanish former football defensive midfielder
- Rubén García (footballer, born 1981), Spanish football midfielder
- Rubén García (footballer, born 1986), Spanish football right-back
- Rubén García (footballer, born 1993), Spanish football winger
- Rubén García (footballer, born 1982), Mexican football goalkeeper
- Rubén García (footballer, born 1998), Spanish football right-back
- Ruben García (football manager) (died 2021), Argentine football manager

== Other people ==
- Ruben Garcia (racing driver) (born 1946), American race car driver
- Rubén García Jr. (racing driver) (born 1995), Mexican stock car racing driver
- Rubén García (co-driver)
- Ruben Garcia Jr. (FBI agent) (born 1951), former executive assistant director of the FBI
