= Miguel García =

Miguel García may refer to:

== Religion ==
- Miguel García Serrano (1569–1629), Spanish Roman Catholic prelate
- Miguel García Cuesta (1803–1873) Spanish Roman Catholic cardinal and academic
- Miguel García Franco (1909–1981), Mexican Roman Catholic prelate

== Sports ==
=== Association football (soccer) ===
- Miguel García (footballer, born 1971), Mexican football defender
- Miguel García (Spanish footballer) (born 1979), Spanish football midfielder
- Miguel Garcia (Portuguese footballer) (born 1983), Portuguese football defender
- Miguel Sebastián Garcia (born 1984), a.k.a. "Pitu", Argentine football midfielder
- Migue García (Miguel Alberto García Díaz, born 1991), Spanish footballer
- Miguel García (footballer, born 2001), Mexican football midfielder

=== Other sports ===
- Miguel García Onsalo (1897–1921), Spanish runner
- Miguel García (boxer) (1945–2009), Argentine boxer
- Miguel García (water polo) (born 1946), Cuban water polo player
- Miguel García (baseball) (born 1967), Venezuelan baseball player
- Miguel García (canoeist) (born 1973), Spanish sprint canoeist

== Others ==
- Miguel García Granados (1809–1878), Guatemalan politician
- Miguel García Vivancos (1895–1972), Spanish anarchist and painter
- Miguel García García (1908–1981), Spanish anarchist
- Miguel Garcia (politician) (born 1951), American politician in New Mexico
- Miguel García-Garibay, Mexican-born chemist and academic

== See also ==
- Michael Garcia (disambiguation)
- Miguel Ángel García (disambiguation)
