= Óscar García (basketball) =

Spanish basketball player

Lleida Bàsquet
- Position: Small forward

Personal information
- Born: March 4, 1979 (age 47) Bilbao, Spain
- Listed height: 6 ft 7 in (2.01 m)

Career information
- College: Fairfield (1999–2003)
- NBA draft: 2003: undrafted
- Playing career: 2003–present

Óscar Javier García Burón (born March 4, 1979, in Bilbao) is a Spanish professional basketball player. He currently plays for Lleida Bàsquet of the Spanish LEB Oro.

== Playing career ==
- 1999/03 (United States) Fairfield Stags
- 2003/04 (Greece) Ionikos
- 2003/04 (Spain) Aracena Ponts
- 2004/05 (Spain) Ourense
- 2005/06 (Spain) TAU Cerámica
- 2006/07 (Spain) CB Murcia (loan)
- 2007/10 (Spain) CB Murcia
- 2010/11 (Spain) Lleida Bàsquet

== Honours ==
TAU Cerámica

- Copa del Rey Champion: 1
  - 2006
