= Nicole Garcia (disambiguation) =

Nicole Garcia (born 1946) is a French actress, film director and writer.

Nicole Garcia may also refer to:

- Nicole Garcia (golfer) (born 1990), South African professional golfer
- Nicole Garcia (wrestler) (born 1983), American twin pro-wrestler known as Nikki Bella
