= El ciego de la aldea =

- Directed by: Ángel García Cardona (es)
- Written by: Antonio Cuesta
- Produced by: Films Cuesta (Valencia, Spain)
- Cinematography: Ángel García Cardona
- Release date: 1907 (Spain)
- Running time: 11 minutes
- Country: Spain
- Language: Spanish

El ciego de la aldea (English: The Blind Man of the Village) is a Spanish short silent film directed by Ángel García Cardona. It was released in Spain in 1907, making it the first Spanish melodrama on film.

== Plot ==
In Godella, a municipality in the Province of Valencia, a blind man and a young girl ask for charity in a street. First they ask a group of sinister-looking men who rebuff them, then they ask a well-dressed couple who give them money while the men watch with interest.

Later, on a deserted road, the group of men attack the couple who had arrived in a carriage. They abduct the woman and force the man to sign a check. The bandits bring the woman to a cave, but the young girl, hidden behind a bush had seen them. Together with the blind man, they free the woman. As the young girl exits the cave, she sees the man together with a group of policemen. She shows them where the woman was held and they decide to ambush the bandits.

The police easily overpower the bandits and the couple thank the blind man and the young girl for their help.

== Production and analysis ==

The film was produced by Film Cuesta, the first film studio in Spain, created in Valencia in 1904. The Director Ángel García Cardona had already directed 20 short documentaries between 1899 and 1904. The film was shot on location in Godella, in the province of Valencia, in 1906 and is regarded as the oldest Spanish melodrama which has been preserved. Before this date, Spanish films were mostly short documentaries or short comedies. The film is composed of 6 scenes with a total of 11 shots using 7 different sets, 6 outdoors and one indoors.

According to Tatjana Pavlovic, the film is illustrative of most of the traits that marked early silent Spanish films and more particularly of the thriving production activities of Films Cuesta in Valencia. "El ciego de la Aldea, with its central blind character, originates from the long Spanish literary tradition of Blind Romances found in orally transmitted ballads and Cordel literature."

Antonia Rey Reguillo has stressed that the cinematography of this film marked a departure from "primitive cinema" where the frontal camera gave a theatrical perspective. Here, on the contrary, the camera is positioned on the side which makes it possible to have images with great depth and perspective. She also stresses that the way in which actors avoid overacting demonstrates the search for naturalism. This is reinforced by extradiegetic details such as the dog who crosses the screen in the fourth shot. This was likely unplanned and resulted from the fact that the film was shot on location but it adds an element of realism. The indoor scenes, which use theatrical elements such as the painted backdrops, are those which are closest to the esthetics of theatre plays. This is even accentuated by the fact that in the last shot, where the bandits are overpowered, the actors briefly freeze in a way reminiscent of Tableaux vivants. However, even in these scene, continuity editing with characters moving out of the cave to be seen on an outdoor location in the following shot, make it impossible to identify the diegetic space with the theatrical set.
