= Diana Garcia =

Diana Garcia or García may refer to:

- Diana García (cyclist) (born 1982), Colombian cyclist
- Diana Garcia (poet) (born 1950), American poet
- Diana García (squash player) (born 1992), Mexican squash player
- Diana García (footballer) (born 1999), Mexican footballer
