= Aaron Garcia =

Aaron Garcia may refer to:

- Aaron Garcia (American football) (born 1970), American arena football quarterback
- Aaron Garcia (boxer) (born 1982), Mexican-American boxer
