= Sara García (disambiguation) =

Sara García (1895–1980) was a Mexican actress.

Sara García may also refer to:

- Sara Garcia (Canadian actress)
- Sara García Alonso, Spanish cancer researcher and reserve ESA astronaut
- Sara García Gross (born 1986), Salvadoran activist, psychologist, feminist, and human rights defender
