= Xavier García =

Xavier García may refer to:

- Xavier García Albiol (born 1967), Spanish politician
- Xavier García (water polo) (born 1984), Spanish water polo player
- Xavier García (footballer) (born 1990), Salvadoran footballer

== See also ==
- Javier García (disambiguation)
