= José Antonio García =

José or Jose Antonio García may refer to:

- José Antonio García (journalist), Mexican journalist and editor
- José Antonio García (sound mixer), Mexican sound mixer
- José Antonio García Belaúnde (1948–2025), Peruvian career diplomat
- Joe Garcia (born José Antonio Garcia Jr., 1963), American politician
- José García Calvo (born 1975), Spanish retired footballer
- Toni García (footballer, born 1976) (born 1976), Spanish footballer
- Verza (footballer) (born 1986), Spanish footballer
- José Antonio García Fernández (born 1992), Mexican footballer
- Jose Antonio Garcia (Californio bandit) a member of the Jack Powers Gang

== See also ==
- José García Antonio (born 1947), Mexican potter
- Jose Garcia (disambiguation)
