= Javier García =

Javier García may refer to:

== Academics ==
- Javier García Sánchez (born 1955), Spanish writer
- Javier García Martinez (born 1973), Spanish inorganic chemist

== Politicians ==
- Javier García Paniagua (1935–1998) Mexican politician
- Javier García González (born 1942), Mexican politician
- Javier García (Uruguayan politician) (born 1963), Uruguayan physician and politician
- Javier García Choque (born 1975), Chilean politician
- Javier Aureliano García (born 1976), Spanish politician
- Javier García (politician, born 1982), Spanish Socialist Workers' Party politician
- Javier García (politician, born 1985), Spanish People's Party politician

== Sportspeople ==
=== Association football ===
- Javier García (Argentine footballer) (born 1987), Argentine goalkeeper for Boa Juniors
- Javier García Lomelí (born 1943), Mexican footballer
- Javi García (footballer, born 1977), Spanish manager and former right-back
- Javi García (born 1987), Spanish manager and former defensive midfielder

=== Other sports ===
- Javier García (handballer) (1947–2025), Spanish handball player and coach
- Javier García (pole vaulter) (born 1966), Spanish pole vaulter
- Javier García (fencer) (born 1976), Spanish fencer
- Javier García-Sintes (born 1979), Spanish tennis player
- Javier García (rower) (born 1992), Spanish rower

== Other people ==
- Javier Garcia, the main protagonist of The Walking Dead: A New Frontier

== See also ==
- Xavier García (disambiguation)
