= Orlando Garcia =

Orlando Garcia may refer to:

- Orlando Jacinto Garcia (born 1954), Cuban American composer of contemporary classical music
- Orlando Luis Garcia (born 1952), United States district court judge
- Orlando García (footballer) (born 1995), Mexican footballer
