= Robert Garcia =

Robert Garcia may refer to:

== People ==
- Robert Garcia (baseball) (born 1996), American baseball player
- Robert Garcia (California congressman) (born 1977), United States Representative from California; former mayor of Long Beach, California
- Robert Garcia (California assemblymember), state legislator
- Robert Garcia (New York politician) (1933–2017), United States Representative from New York
- Robert Garcia (American boxer) (born 1975), boxing trainer and former IBF Super Featherweight Champion
- Robert Garcia (squash player) (born 1986), Filipino squash player
- Bobbito Garcia (Robert Garcia, born 1966), Puerto Rican-American DJ, writer, and broadcaster

== Fictional characters ==
- Robert Garcia (Art of Fighting), a video game character from the SNK series Art of Fighting and The King of Fighters
- Robbie Garcia, a character from the TV series 6teen

== See also ==
- Roberto García (disambiguation)
