= Gilberto García =

Gilberto García may refer to:

- Gilberto García (footballer, born 1959)
- Gilberto García (footballer, born 1987)
- Gilberto García (footballer, born 2000)
- Gilberto García (chess player) (1919–?)
- Gilberto García (judoka) (born 1969)
- Gilberto García Mena (born 1954), Mexican drug lord
