= Borja García =

Borja García may refer to:

- Borja García (racing driver) (born 1982), Spanish racing driver
- Borja García (footballer, born January 1990), Spanish football defender
- Borja García (footballer, born November 1990), Spanish football attacking midfielder
