= Saúl García =

Saúl García is the name of:

- Saúl García (footballer, born 1986), Mexican winger
- Saúl García (footballer, born 1994), Spanish defender
- Saúl Martínez García, Mexican musician
