= Federico García =

Federico García may refer to:

- Federico García Lorca (1898–1936), Spanish poet, playwright and theatre director
- Federico García (skier) (born 1951), Chilean alpine skier in the 1976 Winter Olympics
- Freddie M. Garcia (born 1944), Filipino television executive
