= Carmen García =

Carmen García may refer to:

- Carmen García González (1905–1980), first lady of Mexico
- Carmen García Rosado (1926–2016), Puerto Rican educator, author and activist for the rights of women veterans
- Carmen García Bloise (1937–1994), Spanish politician
- Carmen García Maura (born 1945), Spanish actress
- Carmen M. Garcia (born 1957/1958), former Chief Judge of Trenton Municipal Court
- Carmen García (politician) (born 1963), Bolivian politician
- María del Carmen García (born 1969), Cuban high jumper
- María del Carmen García Alcay (active 1989–2000), Spanish karateka
- Maica García Godoy (born 1990), Spanish water polo player

== See also ==
- Carmen Sevilla (1930–2021, born María del Carmen García Galisteo), Spanish actress, singer and dancer
- Carme García (born 1974), Spanish visually impaired para-alpine skier, blind sailor and journalist
