= Ángel García (footballer, born 1976) =

Mexican footballer and manager

Personal information
- Full name: Ángel Eduardo García Gutiérrez
- Date of birth: 3 February 1976 (age 50)
- Place of birth: Monterrey, Nuevo León
- Position: Defender

Senior career*
Years	Team	Apps	(Gls)
1999–2003	UANL	1	(0)
2003	Cobras	7	(0)
2003–2004	Monterrey	4	(0)
2004–2005	Cobras	29	(1)
2005–2006	UAT	30	(5)
2007–2008	Monterrey	40	(2)
2008	Veracruz Premier	8	(0)
2008	Orizaba	1	(0)

Managerial career
- 2013–2015: Rayados Monterrey
- 2016–2018: Tigres UANL Reserves
- * Club domestic league appearances and goals

Ángel Eduardo García Gutiérrez (born March 2, 1976) is a Mexican football manager and former player.
