= Néstor García =

Néstor García may refer to:

- Néstor García (basketball) (born 1965), Argentine basketball coach
- Nestor Garcia (politician) (born 1957), American politician from Hawaii
- Néstor García (runner) (born 1975), Uruguayan marathon runner
- Nestor García (wrestler) (born 1966), Venezuelan Olympic wrestler
