= Gabriël Garcia =

Spanish cyclist (1903–1970)

Personal information
- Born: 28 October 1903
- Died: 23 April 1970 (aged 66)

Cycling career
- Sport: Cycling
- Discipline: Road
- Role: Rider

Gabriël Garcia (28 October 1903 – 23 April 1970) was a Spanish racing cyclist. He rode in the 1928 Tour de France.
