= Nito (footballer, born 1939) =

Spanish footballer

Personal information
- Full name: Fernando García Paredes
- Date of birth: 26 December 1939 (age 86)
- Place of birth: Guardamar del Segura, Spain
- Height: 1.68 m (5 ft 6 in)
- Position: Forward

Senior career*
Years	Team	Apps	(Gls)
1961–1962	Real Murcia	7	(0)
Total		7	(0)
- * Club domestic league appearances and goals

Fernando García Paredes, nicknamed Nito (born 26 December 1939) is a Spanish former professional footballer who played as a forward.

== Career ==
Born in Guardamar del Segura, Nito played for Real Murcia. His older brother Joaquín, also known as "Nito", was also a footballer.
