= Carlos García Portela =

Puerto Rican politician

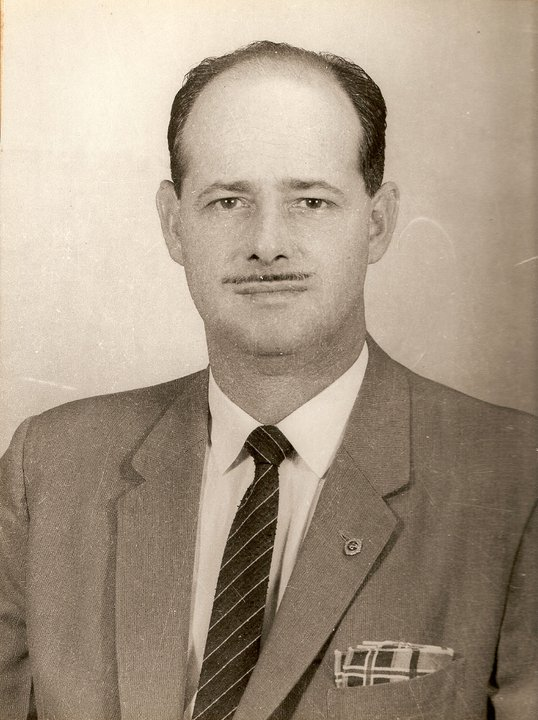

Member of the Puerto Rico Senate from the San Juan district
- In office 1965–1969

Personal details
- Born: Carlos Edgardo García Portela; November 18, 1921 Vega Baja, Puerto Rico
- Died: January 2, 2011 (aged 89) Río Piedras, Puerto Rico
- Party: Popular Democratic Party
- Spouse: Carmen Irene Goyco Monagas
- Children: Carlos García Goyco; Osvaldo García Goyco; Carenín García Goyco; Edgardo García Goyco
- Education: University of Puerto Rico School of Law (JD)
- Profession: Lawyer, Politician, Senator

Carlos Edgardo García Portela (November 18, 1921, in Vega Baja, Puerto Rico – January 2, 2011) was a Puerto Rican lawyer, politician and former senator.

He was a member of the Senate of Puerto Rico from 1965 to 1969 representing the Popular Democratic Party (PPD).

Carlos García Portela was born on November 18, 1921, in Vega Baja, Puerto Rico. He was the son of dentist and politician Carlos García del Rosario and Amparo Portela Pérez.

García Portela was elected to the Senate of Puerto Rico, representing the District of San Juan, at the 1964 general elections. He served in that position until 1968.

García Portela was married to Carmen Irene Goyco Monagas.

They had four children together: Carlos, Osvaldo, Carenín and Edgardo.

He died on January 2, 2011, at the age of 89. He was buried at Buxeda Memorial Park in Río Piedras, Puerto Rico.
