= Jacalyn Lopez Garcia =

American multimedia artist

Jacalyn Lopez Garcia (born 1953) is a multimedia Chicana artist and activist, whose work focuses on photography and digital art. She has worked in photography, painting, music and theater. Her art has been featured in museums, newspaper articles, universities, and in books. She is best known for her interactive art website titled Glass Houses, which touches on ideas of immigration, injustice, cultural identity, and her personal experience growing up as a Chicana.

== Early life and education ==
Jacalyn Lopez Garcia was born in Monrovia, California, but spent most of her childhood in Santa Ana, California. Her father was born in Colorado, and her mother immigrated from Mexico. She received her associate degree from Santa Ana Junior College, and continued on to get her bachelor's degree in Studio Art and Photography from UC Riverside in 1997. In 1999, she earned her M.F.A degree in Photography and Multimedia.

== Careers ==
Garcia's interest in photography was sparked by one of her first jobs as a darkroom assistant for her husband. She gained experience through this, as her husband owned García Advertising, and other businesses that exposed her to a career pathway in art. She later went on to be a choreographer and instructor at Riverside Repertory Theatre, which is a family owned business. She continued her career in the theatre industry working for the Department of Theatre at UC Riverside. Gaining experience in all of these industries inspired her to take the next step, and become a professor at Riverside Community College. She taught a variety of classes there, ranging from Multimedia to Art and Photography until 2017. She now manages Goldie's Farm Artist Retreat and Spiritual Healing Center located on the west shore of the Salton Sea. She manages healing sessions, art classes, presentations, and inspires healers and citizens to touch base with their artistic side.

== Notable works ==
=== Glass Houses ===
Garcia's website titled Glass Houses was inspired by her personal experience as a Chicana growing up in the suburbs of California. This immersive website was highly anticipated before its release, as it was featured in newspapers and online articles. In this website, the viewer is seen as a visitor, who walks around Garcia's virtual house. Each room has its own gallery of art that touches on issues of cultural sensitivity, oppression, injustice, immigration, and much more, and navigating through this house creates an intimate experience for the viewer. Unique rooms include, but are not limited to the closet, where Garcia states that the secrets are hidden, and the kitchen, which acts as a message center to reach Garcia.

=== Life Cycles: Reflections of Change and a New Hope for Future Generations ===
This documentary project explores personal stories and the overall historic patterns of immigration to the United States. The California Council for Humanities funded this project, which allowed Garcia to follow seven families who worked in the farming industry. Through this documentary, viewers follow along with her and see first hand the struggles these families had to bear. Garcia felt that immigration was a neglected topic in popular media, and created this project to help shed light on what people go through to reach a new promised land of opportunity. It also focuses on how immigrants change the California landscape and the personal accomplishments they make.

=== In Search of Mago ===
This performance-based project is a fun and playful piece starring Garcia's dog, Goldie. This piece differs from much of Garcia’s other work by use of non-traditional storytelling. Viewers are encouraged to become a part of this work, and share their own stories through the blog on her website. The original story is hung on the main house of Goldie's retreat, and focuses on ideas of femininity and identity. Its blending of fiction and reality sets it apart from her other works, and acts as a way to bring Garcia and her fanbase closer together.

== Chicana culture ==
The majority of Garcia's work is inspired by her culture. As a Chicana woman who grew up in the suburbs of California, she personally recognizes the struggles some may have with cultural identity, and staying true to one's roots when they are not commonly celebrated in the society around them.

== Accomplishments ==
2023 contributing writer: The Multimedia Works of Contemporary Latin American Women Writers and Artists by Dr Jane Elizabeth Lavery, Editor.

Garcia was awarded the California Council for the Humanities Grant in 2005. The following year she received the Latino Net's Artistic and Community Achievement Award, and the Senator Barbara Boxer's Leadership Award. Her work was featured in Gary Keller's books, and in several museums and universities (California Museum of Photography, Long Beach museum of art, UC Riverside, Claremont Graduate University, and the Hispanic Research Center at University at Tempe).
