= Bryan Garcia =

Brayan, Brian or Bryan Garcia or García may refer to:

- Bryan Garcia (Brazilian footballer) (born 1992), left back a/k/a Bryan
- Brayan García (born 1993), Honduran footballer
- Bryan Garcia (baseball) (born 1995), American pitcher
- Bryan García (Nicaraguan footballer) (born 1995), winger
- Brian García (born 1997), Mexican footballer
- Bryan García (Ecuadorian footballer) (born 2001), midfielder
