= Monica Garcia =

Monica Garcia may refer to:

- Mónica García (born 1974), Spanish anesthesiologist and politician
- Monica Garcia (reality television personality), American reality television personality
- Monica Garcia (news anchor), American news anchor
- Mónica García de la Fuente (born 1980), Mexican politician and lawyer
