= David Garcia =

David Garcia or García may refer to:

== Sports ==
- Dave Garcia (1920–2018), American former baseball coach, scout and manager
- David Apolinar Jones Garcia (born 2001) Dominican Professional NBA basketball player
- David García (cyclist, born 1970), Spanish retired cyclist
- David García (cyclist, born 1977), Spanish retired cyclist
- David García (footballer, born 1980), Spanish retired footballer
- David García (footballer, born 1981), Spanish retired footballer
- David García (footballer, born 1982), Spanish footballer for UD Tamaraceite
- David García (footballer, born 1994), Spanish footballer for Al-Rayyan
- David García (footballer, born 2003), Spanish footballer for Cádiz CF
- David García Mitogo (1990–2023), Equatoguinean footballer
- David García (motorcyclist) (fl. 1995–2005), motorcycle GP racer, see list of Grand Prix motorcycle racing European champions
- David Garcia Fernandez (born 1983), Spanish archer
- David García del Valle (born 1981), Spanish judoka
- David Garcia (weightlifter) (born 1989), American weightlifter
- David García (sprinter) (born 2005), Spanish 400 metres runner
- David García Ilundáin (1971–2002), Spanish chess grandmaster

== Other ==
- David Garcia (computer scientist), Spanish computer scientist
- David Garcia (journalist) (1944–2007), American broadcast journalist for ABC News
- David Garcia (musician) (born 1983), American Christian musician, producer and songwriter
- David Garcia (politician), Democratic candidate for governor of Arizona
