= Ruben García (football manager) =

Argentine football coach and former player

Ruben Garcia
Personal information
- Full name: Ruben Garcia
- Place of birth: Argentina
- Date of death: May 20, 2021
- Place of death: Luanda, Angola

Managerial career
- Years: Team
- 1989: Angola national football team

Ruben Garcia (died 20 May 2021) was an Argentine football coach and former player. He coached the Angola national football team in 1989.

== Coaching career ==
Ruben Garcia coached the Angola national team in 1989, during the 1990 World Cup qualifiers. He led the team to a historic 2–0 victory over Uruguay in a friendly match at the Estádio da Cidadela in Luanda. He also guided the team to a 2–2 draw with Zambia and a 2–0 win over Malawi in the qualifiers. However, Angola failed to qualify for the World Cup after losing to Nigeria in the final round.

== Death ==
Ruben Garcia died on 20 May 2021 in Luanda, Angola, at the age of 82. He had been suffering from an illness.
