= Nito (footballer, born 1934) =

Spanish footballer

Personal information
- Full name: Juan Álvarez Romero
- Date of birth: 5 July 1934 (age 92)
- Place of birth: Caravaca de la Cruz, Spain
- Position: Forward

Senior career*
| Years | Team | Apps | (Gls) |
| 1958–1960 | Elche | 26 | (10) |
| 1960–1962 | Cádiz | 6 | (1) |
| Total | | 32 | (11) |
- * Club domestic league appearances and goals

Juan Álvarez Romero, nicknamed Nito (born 5 July 1934) is a Spanish former professional footballer who played as a forward.

== Career ==
Born in Caravaca de la Cruz, Nito played for Elche and Cádiz.
