= Domingo García Ramos =

Mexican architect

Domingo García Ramos (August 3 1911 in Mexico, D.F., – May 9 1978 in Mexico, D.F.) was a prominent Mexican architect. As well as the author of several books:

- Iniciación al Urbanismo (1961)
- Arquitectura y artes decorativas (1966)
- Primeros pasos en diseño urbano (1968)
- Planificación de edificios para la enseñanza (1971)
- Todos Tenemos la Culpa... y por eso estamos como estamos (1977)
