= Bebel García =

Spanish footballer and politician

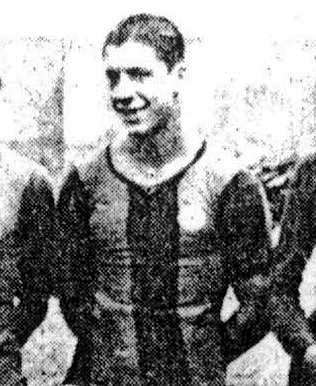
- Bebel García García before 1936

Personal information
- Full name: Bebel García García
- Date of birth: 1914
- Place of birth: Ribadeo, Spain
- Date of death: 29 July 1936 (aged 21–22)
- Place of death: A Coruña, Spain

Senior career*
| Years | Team | Apps | (Gls) |
| 1933–1936 | Deportivo da Coruña | 28 | (11) |
- * Club domestic league appearances and goals

Bebel García García (1914 – 29 July 1936) was a Spanish football player and politician from Galicia.

He was executed on 29 July 1936, minutes after the Spanish coup of July 1936. He was honoured by Eduardo Galeano in his poem Espejos, una historia casi universal. His last request was to urinate on his executioners.

He played as left winger for Deportivo da Coruña from 1933 to 1936 on Segunda División and he scored 11 goals in 28 matches.

His brother France was also executed and his other brother Jaurés was incarcerated because he was underage.

== Bibliography ==
- Lamela García, Luís (2002). A Coruña, 1936. Memoria convulsa de una represión. Edicións do Castro.
