= Roberto García =

Roberto García may refer to:

== Arts and entertainment ==
- Roberto García (bassist) (born 1972), Spanish musician
- Roberto García Morillo (1911–2003), Argentine composer and musicologist
- Roberto García Ruiz (born 1974), Spanish actor

== Sports ==
=== Association football (soccer) ===
- Roberto García (footballer, born 1973), Spanish footballer
- Roberto García (referee) (born 1974), Mexican football referee
- Roberto García (footballer, born 1980), Spanish footballer

=== Other sports ===
- Roberto García (cyclist) (born 1937), Salvadoran cyclist
- Roberto García (runner) (born 1975), Spanish long-distance runner
- Roberto Alcaide García (born 1978), Spanish cyclist
- Roberto García (Mexican boxer) (born 1980), Mexican boxer
- Roberto García Parrondo (born 1980), Spanish team handball player

== Others ==
- Roberto García-Calvo Montiel (1942–2008), Spanish judge
- Roberto Marcos García (1956–2006), Mexican journalist
- Roberto García Morís (born 1982), Spanish politician
- Roberto García Pantoja (born 1992), Cuban chess grandmaster

== See also ==
- Robert Garcia (disambiguation)
