= Jesús García (disambiguation) =

Jesús García refers to the following people:

- Jesús "Chuy" García (born 1956), American politician from Illinois
- Jesús Ángel García (born 1969), Spanish race walker
- Jesús García (1881–1907), Mexican railroad brakeman and national hero
- Jesús García Leoz (1904–1953), Spanish composer
- Jesús Garibay García (born 1946), Mexican PRD politician
- Jesús Reyna García (born 1952), Mexican lawyer and PRI politician
- Jesús García (basketball) (born 1952), Mexican Olympic basketball player
- Jsu Garcia (born 1963), American actor and producer

== Footballers ==
- Jesús García Pitarch (born 1963), Spanish footballer
- Jesús Sánchez García (born 1989), Mexican footballer
- Jesús García Tena (born 1990), Spanish footballer
- Jesús Álvaro García (born 1990), Spanish footballer
- Jesús Daniel García (born 1994), Mexican footballer
