= Jaime García =

Jaime García may refer to:

- Jaime García (equestrian) (1910–1959), Spanish equestrian
- Jaime García Añoveros (1932–2000), Spanish politician
- Jaime García (footballer) (born 1977), Chilean football manager and former player
- Jaime García (baseball) (born 1986), Mexican baseball player
- Jaime Garcia Alsina (1874–1936), Spanish doctor and president of the Catalan Olympic Committee
