= Joshua García (disambiguation) =

Joshua García may refer to:

- Josh García (born 1993), Dominican football player
- Joshua Garcia (born 1997), Filipino actor, dancer and model
- Joshua A. Garcia (born 1986), American politician
- Rico Garcia (born 1994), American baseball player
