= Vincent Garcia (disambiguation) =

Vincent Garcia (born 1967) is a Filipino politician.

Vincent Garcia may also refer to:

- Sunny Garcia (born 1970), Hawaiian surfer
- Vincent Garcia de la Huerta, 18th-century Spanish poet, author, dramatist and critic
