= José Miguel García =

José Miguel García may refer to:

- José Miguel García Lanza (died 1828), hero of the Bolivian wars of independence
- José García (field hockey) (born 1952), Spanish field hockey player from Spain
