= Iván García =

Iván García may refer to:

- Iván García Cortina (born 1995), Spanish cyclist
- Iván García (diver) (born 1993), Mexican diver
- Iván García (footballer) (1947–1993), Venezuelan footballer
- Iván García Guerra (1938–2025), Dominican actor, writer and academic
- Iván García Solís (born 1936), Mexican politician, federal deputy
- Iván García (sprinter) (born 1972), former sprinter from Cuba
