= Alex García =

Alex García or Garcia may refer to:

== Sportspeople ==
- Alex Garcia (basketball) (born 1980), Brazilian basketball player
- Alex García (boxer) (born 1961), American heavyweight boxer
- Alex Garcia (fighter) (born 1987), Mixed martial artist
- Álex García (footballer, born 1970), Spanish footballer
- Alex Garcia (footballer, born 1979), Brazilian football player
- Álex García (footballer, born 1984), Spanish footballer
- Alex García (racing driver, born 1977), Venezuelan race car driver
- Alex García (racing driver, born 2003), Mexican race car driver
- Alex García King (born 1959), Colombian football manager and former player

== Other people ==
- Álex García (actor) (born 1981), Spanish actor
- Alex García (chef), Cuban chef
- Alex García (producer) (born 1966), Spanish producer
- Alex P. Garcia (1929–1999), American politician in California

== See also ==
- Alejandro García (disambiguation)
- Alejo García (disambiguation)
