= Luis García =

Luis García or Luis Garcia may refer to:

== Sports ==
=== Athletics ===
- Luis Fernando García (born 1974), Guatemalan race walker
- Luis García (Cuban racewalker), Cuban athlete and medalist at the 1999 Central American and Caribbean Championships in Athletics
- Luis García (hammer thrower), Mexican hammer thrower and medalist at the 2004 NACAC U23 Championships in Athletics
- Luis Garcia (Paralympic athlete), competitor in Athletics at the 1992 Summer Paralympics – Men's 100 metres B1
- Luis García (runner), Spanish distance runner and winner at the Spanish Cross Country Championships
- Luis García (shot putter), Ecuadorian shot putter and medalist in athletics at the 1993 Bolivarian Games
- Luis García (sprinter), Venezuelan sprinter and medalist at the 1982 Pan American Junior Athletics Championships
- Luis García (Venezuelan racewalker), Venezuelan athlete competing in 50 m walk and medalist in athletics at the 1994 South American Games
- Luís García, Portuguese triple jumper

=== Baseball ===
- Luis García (third baseman) (1929–2014), Venezuelan baseball player
- Luis García (shortstop) (born 1975), Dominican baseball player
- Luis García (outfielder) (born 1975), Mexican-American baseball player
- Luis García (first baseman) (born 1978), Mexican baseball player
- Luis García (pitcher, born 1987), Dominican baseball player
- Luis García (pitcher, born 1996), Venezuelan baseball player
- Luis García Jr. (born 2000), American baseball infielder

=== Football (soccer) ===
- Luis García (Chilean footballer), Chilean international footballer in 1917
- Luis García (footballer, born 1964), Mexican football manager and former defender
- Luis García (footballer, born 1969), Mexican footballer, played for Mexico and various clubs, now a commentator
- Luis García (footballer, born 1972), Spanish football coach
- Luis Tevenet (born Luis García Tevenet, 1974), former Spanish football forward
- Luis García (footballer, born 1978), Spanish football midfielder
- Luis García (footballer, born 1979), Spanish football goalkeeper
- Luis García (footballer, born 1981), Spanish football striker
- Luis Ángel García (born 1984), Mexican football midfielder, mostly played for Veracruz and Querétaro
- Luis Francisco García (born 1987), Mexican footballer, mostly played for Necaxa
- Luis García (footballer, born 1988), Peruvian footballer, has mostly played for Unión Comercio, Deportivo Municipal and Melgar
- Luis García (footballer, born 1992), Mexican football goalkeeper, has mostly played for Toluca on loan from Querétaro
- Luis García (footballer, born March 1993), Mexican football forward
- Luis García (footballer, born 1996), Chilean football midfielder
- Luis García (football manager) (born 1988), Argentine football manager

=== Other sports ===
- Luis García (basketball player) (born 1941), Uruguayan basketball player
- Luis García (basketball coach) (born 1968), Mexican basketball coach
- Luis García (fencer) (born 1934), Venezuelan fencer
- Luis-Augusto García (fl. 1966–67), Mexican tennis player
- Luis García (weightlifter) (born 1995), Dominican weightlifter
- Luis Alberto García (born 1980), Venezuelan taekwondo practitioner
- Luis Eduardo García, Spanish handball player

== Politicians ==
- Luis Roberto García, Colombian politician and governor of the Department of Cesar
- Luis García Meza (1929–2018), president of Bolivia
- Luis Garcia (politician) (born 1945), Miami politician
- Luís Garcia (born 1971), Portuguese Azorean politician and president of the Legislative Assembly of the Azores

== Others ==
- Luis Garcia Santos (public figure)
- Luis Armand Garcia (born 1992), American actor, known for his role as Max Lopez on the 2002 ABC sitcom George Lopez
- Luis García Berlanga (1921–2010), Spanish film director and screenwriter
- Luis García Mozos (born 1946), Spanish comic book artist
- Fernando Luis García (1929–1952), member of United States Marine Corps, first Puerto Rican awarded with the Medal of Honor
