= Patricia García =

Patricia García may refer to:

- Patricia García (rugby union) (born 1989), Spanish rugby union player
- Patricia J. Garcia, Peruvian professor
- Patricia García (gymnast) (born 1957), Mexican gymnast
- Patty García (Edelmira Patricia García, born 1984/1985), American politician
