= Michael Garcia =

Michael or Mike Garcia may refer to:

- Michael Garcia (Colorado politician) (born 1974), former Colorado legislator
- Michael Garcia (New Hampshire politician), former New Hampshire legislator
- Michael Garcia (New Mexico politician) (born 1979/1980), mayor of Santa Fe
- Mike Garcia (politician) (born 1976), Republican representative from California from 2020 to 2025
- Michael J. Garcia (born 1961), Associate Justice of the New York Court of Appeals
- Mike Garcia (baseball, born 1923) (1923–1986), Major League Baseball pitcher from 1948 to 1961, mainly with the Cleveland Indians
- Mike Garcia (baseball, born 1968), Major League Baseball pitcher for the 1999–2000 Pittsburgh Pirates
- Michael Garcia (soccer) (born 1977), Australian soccer player
- Michael Garcia (runner), winner of the 2007 distance medley relay at the NCAA Division I Indoor Track and Field Championships

== See also ==
- Mikey Garcia (born 1987), American boxer
- Miguel García (disambiguation)
