= Tony Garcia =

Tony Garcia may refer to:

- Tony Garcia (video game producer), video game producer and designer
- Humberto Tony García, voice actor and announcer
- Tony Garcia (playwright), American playwright
- Tony Garcia (racing driver) (born 1945), Cuban American racing driver
- Tony Garcia (singer), American singer and music producer

== See also ==
- Antonio García (disambiguation)
