= Gonzalo Garcia =

Gonzalo Garcia may refer to:

== Sportspeople ==
=== Association football ===
- Gonzalo García (footballer, born 1983), Spanish football manager and former attacking midfielder
- Gonzalo García (footballer, born 1987), Argentine football left-back
- Gonzalo García (footballer, born 2004), Spanish football forward for Real Madrid

=== Rugby ===
- Gonzalo García (rugby union, born 1984), former Argentina-born Italian international rugby union centre
- Gonzalo García (rugby union, born 1999), Argentine international rugby union scrum-half

=== Other sports ===
- Gonzalo García (sailor) (born 1935), Uruguayan Olympic sailor
- Gonzalo García (basketball) (born 1967), Argentine basketball coach
- Gonzalo García (cyclist) (born 1976), Argentine cyclist

== Other people ==
- Gonzalo García Zorro (died 1566), Spanish conquistador
- Gonzalo Garcia (dancer) (born 1979), New York City Ballet principal dancer
- Gonzalo García Núñez (1947–2024), Peruvian industrial engineer

== See also ==
- Gonsalo Garcia (1556–1597), Roman Catholic Franciscan friar from India
