= Julio García =

Julio García or Julio Garcia may refer to:

== Sports ==
- Julio César García (born 1987), Mexican boxer
- Julio García (Peruvian footballer) (born 1981), Peruvian football player
- Julio Garcia (Mexican footballer) (born 1989), Mexican football player with the San Antonio Scorpions
- Julio García Fernández (born 1965), Spanish football player
- Julio García Fernández de los Ríos (1894–1969), Spanish equestrian and Olympic medalist
- Julio García, Chilean soccer team manager for Club Provincial Curicó Unido in the 1990s

== Other ==
- Julio Acosta García (1872–1954), a president of Costa Rica
- Don Julio García Agapito (c. 1964–2008), Peruvian environmentalist
- Julio García, a Governor of Colima in the 1860s
- Julio García Espinosa (1926–2016), Cuban film director
