= Adrián García =

Adrián García may refer to:

- Adrián García (tennis) (born 1978), Chilean tennis player
- Adrián García (actor) (born 1943), Puerto Rican actor
- Adrian Garcia (politician) (born 1960), American politician in Harris County, Texas
- Adrian García Arias (born 1975), Mexican footballer and manager
- Adrián García Conde (1886–1943), Mexican-British chess master
- Adrian Garcia Marquez (born 1973), American sportscaster

== See also ==
- Adrian Garcea (born 1999), Romanian long-distance runner
