= Alan García (disambiguation) =

Alan García (1949–2019) was the 117th and 124th president of Peru.

Alan García may also refer to:

- Al Ernest Garcia (1887–1938), American actor
- Alan Garcia (jockey) (born 1985), Peruvian horse racing jockey
- Alan García (footballer) (born 1993), Mexican footballer
