= Guillermo García Oropeza =

Mexican writer, architect and professor

Guillermo García Oropeza (born in Guadalajara, Jalisco, Mexico, on June 25, 1937) is a Mexican writer, architect and professor.

After studying architecture at the University of Guadalajara he started his career as writer thanks to his close relationships with intellectuals, scientists and artists. In 1966 he did postgraduate studies at Yale University, University of Cincinnati, and Bouwcentrum Rotterdam. He is an active journalist collaborating with national Mexican media such as Grupo Reforma, Revista Siempre!, Excelsior, El Informador among others. He has been awarded with the CONACULTA literary prize and the Pedro Cipres medal. Garcia Oropeza has also written fiction, taught art, history, literature and architecture at the University of San Francisco, and has lectured in the United States and Europe. He has published 34 books.

== Publications ==
- Viaje Mexicano (1979, Fondo de Cultura Económica)
- Mexico (1980, APA Publications)
- La balada de Gary Cooper (1983, UNAM)
- Guadalajara y sus caminos al mar (1984, Aguilar)
- Guadalajara: la perla de occidente (1986, Fomento Cultural Banamex)
- Alejandro Rangel Hidalgo: Artista y cuentacuentos (2003, editorial Ilustra).
