= Ángel García (basketball, born 1941) =

Puerto Rican basketball player

Personal information
- Nationality: Puerto Rican
- Born: 8 December 1941 (age 84)

Sport
- Sport: Basketball

Ángel García (born 8 December 1941) is a Puerto Rican basketball player. He competed in the men's tournament at the 1964 Summer Olympics.
