= Freddy García (disambiguation) =

Freddy García (born 1976) is a Venezuelan baseball pitcher.

Freddy Garcia or Freddie Garcia may also refer to:

- Freddie Garcia (born 1952), Mexican-American soccer player
- Freddy García (infielder) (born 1972), Dominican retired baseball infielder
- Freddy García (football manager) (born 1959), Peruvian football manager
- Freddy García (footballer) (born 1977), Guatemalan footballer
- Freddie M. Garcia (born 1944), Filipino business executive
