= Tanya Garcia (disambiguation) =

Tanya Garcia (born 1981) is a Filipino actress.

Tanya Garcia may also refer to:

- Tanya Garcia-O'Brien (born 1973), American skyflyer and stuntwoman
- Tanya P. Garcia, Peruvian-American biostatistician
