= Salvador García =

Salvador García may refer to:

- Salvador García (boxer) (born 1953), represented Mexico at the 1972 Summer Olympics
- Salvador García (fencer)
- Salvador García (runner) (born 1962), Mexican marathon runner
- Salvador García Acuña (born 1982), football player for Real Estelí F.C. and the Nicaragua national team
- Salvador García Puig (born 1961), retired Spanish footballer known as Salva
- Salvador García Rodríguez (born 1982), Mexican writer
- Salvador Ortiz García (born 1964), Mexican politician
