= Pilar García Negro =

Promoter of the Galician language (born 1953)

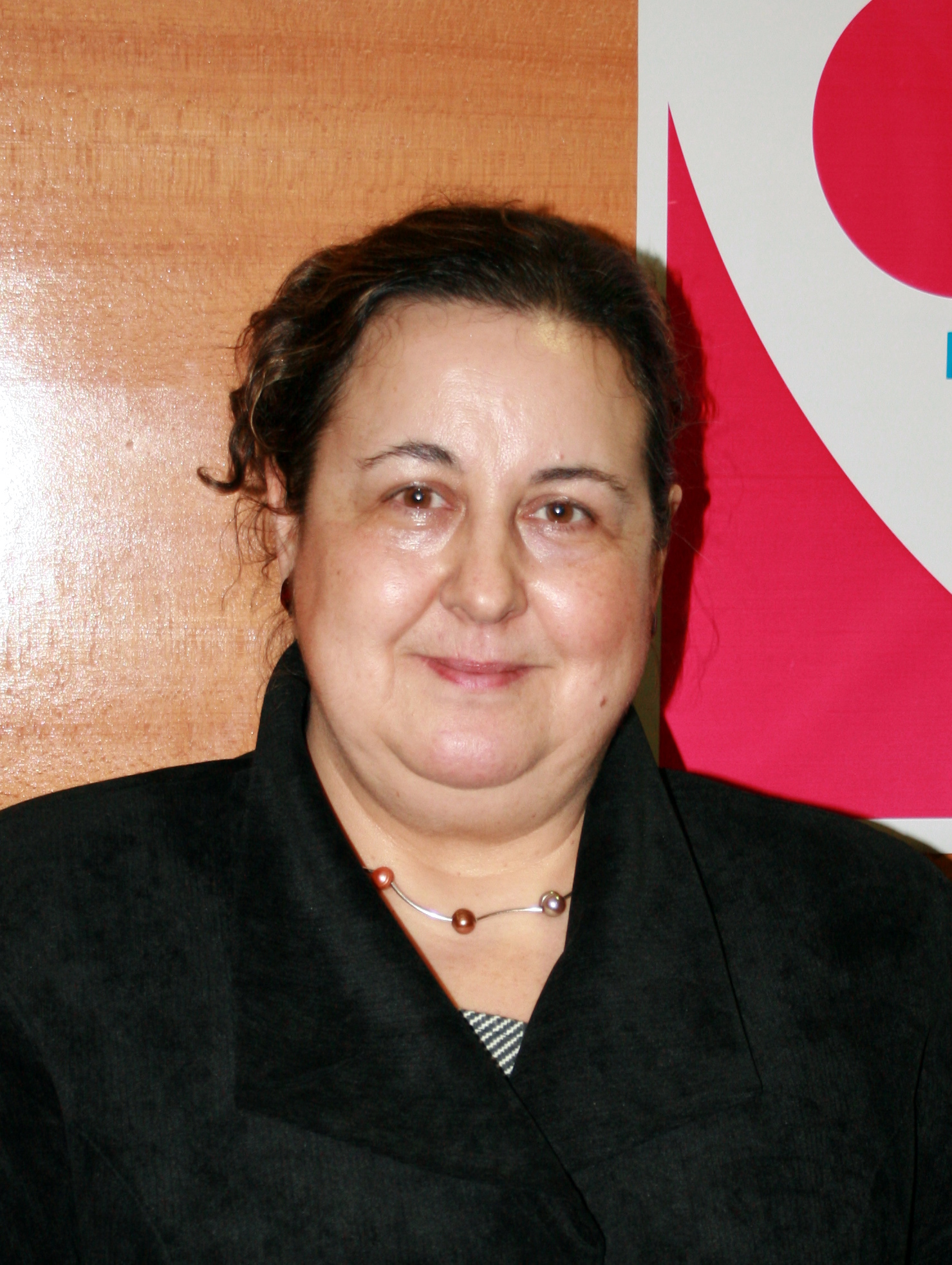

Member of Parliament of Galicia
- In office 1989–2003

Personal details
- Born: María del Pilar García Negro; 9 October 1953 (age 72) Lugo, Spain
- Party: Bloque Nacionalista Galego
- Education: University of Santiago de Compostela
- Profession: Linguist

Pilar García Negro (born 1953) is a Galician/Spanish politician, writer, sociolinguist, teacher, and campaigner in support of Galego, the Galician language, which is spoken in the northwest of Spain and the extreme north of Portugal.

== Early life and education ==
María del Pilar García Negro was born on 9 October 1953 in Lugo in Spain and went to primary and secondary school in that town. She studied Hispanic philology and Galician philology at the University of Santiago de Compostela, receiving a doctorate in January 1991. The title of her thesis was Galician language and legislation (1975-1986).

== Career ==
Negro taught Spanish at the Instituto Eusebio da Guarda in A Coruña between 1976 and 1985 and in A Sardiñeira in the same city between 1985 and 1990. She always taught in Galician, which led to a disciplinary case in 1983. Since 1991 she has been a professor at the University of A Coruña, becoming a full professor in the Department of Galician-Portuguese, French and Linguistics in 1995. Negro published a section called "The language" in the weekly Galician newspaper, A Nosa Terra, from March 1978 to August 1979, followed by a section called "Literature and Language Lessons" with Xosé María Dobarro from 1979 to 1980. A Nosa Terra was written only in Galego.

Negro was president of the Alexandre Bóveda Cultural Association of A Coruña from 1983 to 1988. She is a member of the editorial boards of Altres Nacions, the Philology Journal of the University of A Coruña, and the journal Terra e Tempo. Since 2004 she has been the managing director of the Bautista Álvarez Foundation for nationalist studies. Negro has taken part in numerous national and international conferences on sociolinguistics, non-standard European languages, Galician literature and feminism, and has published studies on Rosalía de Castro, Valentín Lamas Carvajal, Emilia Pardo Bazán, Alfonso Daniel Rodríguez Castelao, Eduardo Blanco Amor, Ricardo Carballo, Manuel María Fernández Teixeiro, Marica Campo, Pilar Pallarés and others who write in the Galician language.

Negro retired from teaching in 2016 although she continues to teach at the Senior University.

== Political career ==
Negro was a member of the Parliament of Galicia for the Bloque Nacionalista Galego (Galician Nationalist Bloc), between 1989 and 2003, the Bloc's first woman deputy. During that time, she stood out as being one of the main defenders of the legality of the Galician place name of the city of A Coruña. She resigned from parliament in 2003 to return to her profession. In 2006 she was tried and convicted, along with Xosé Manuel Carril and Francisco Xosé Rei, for insulting behaviour and public disorder after a plenary session, held in 2004, in the María Pita Palace in A Coruña, because the mayor, Francisco Vázquez Vázquez, intended to make official both the Galician and Spanish place names for the city.

== Publications ==
Negro's publications have included:

=== Essays ===
- O galego e as leis. Aproximación sociolingüística (1991, Edicións do Cumio).
- Sempre en galego (1993, 1999, Laiovento).
- Direitos lingüísticos e control político (2000, Laiovento).
- Arredor de Castelao (2001, A Nosa Terra).
- María Mariño no ronsel das escritoras galegas (2007, Laiovento).
- Xosé María Álvarez Blázquez: Claro mencer do tempo... (2008, Deputación da Coruña).
- De fala a lingua: un proceso inacabado (2009, Laiovento).
- O clamor da rebeldía. Rosalía de Castro: ensaio e feminismo (2010, Sotelo Blanco).
- Ricardo Carvalho Calero: a ciencia ao servizo da nación (2010, Laiovento).
- Outramente... (2012, Laiovento).
- Cantares gallegos hoxe. Unha lectura actualizada de Rosalía de Castro (2013, Alvarellos).
- Galiza e feminismo en Emilia Pardo Bazán (2021). Lugo: Alvarellos. 158 páxs.
- Rectificar a historia Escritos sobre Ricardo Carvalho Calero (2021. Santiago: Laiovento. 288 páxs. ISBN 978-84-9151-631-6.

=== Forewords to books ===
- A gente da Barreira, by Ricardo Carvalho Calero.
- Teatro, by Jenaro Marinhas del Valle (1997, AS-PG/A Nosa Terra).
- Poesia galega, by Valentín Lamas Carvajal (1998, Ediciós do Castro).
- Confusión de María Balteira, by Marica Campo (2006, Universidade da Coruña).
- El caballero de las botas azules. Lieders. Las literatas, by Rosalía de Castro (2006, Sotelo Blanco).
- Ricardo Carvalho Calero. Obra literaria: poesía, teatro e narrativa. (2022. Manuel Castelao Mexuto e María Pilar García Negro (Eds.). Biblos. 670 páxs.

=== Translations ===
- Rosalía de Castro. Notas biográficas, by Augusto González Besada (2004, A Nosa Terra).
- Idioma e poder social, by Rafael L. Ninyoles (2005, Laiovento). Translation with Antonio Molexón Domínguez.

== Awards and honours ==
Negro has won several awards in the Galician region:

- XV Premio de Ensaio en Ciencias Sociais Vicente Risco (XV Vicente Risco Essay Prize in Social Sciences). 2010, for O clamor da rebeldía (The outcry of rebellion).
- Premio AELG (Asociación de Escritores en Lengua Gallega) in 2011, for O clamor da rebeldía.
- Premio Ánxel Casal of the Asociación Galega de Editores to the best work of non-fiction in 2013, for Cantares gallegos hoxe (Galician singers today).
- A stone describing her achievements was erected in Lugo in 2017.
- Premio Insua dos Poetas 2020.
