= Hugo Colace =

Hugo Colace may refer to:

- Hugo Colace (cinematographer) (born 1953), Argentine cinematographer
- Hugo Colace (footballer) (born 1984), Argentine footballer
