= Ángel García (footballer, born 2000) =

Mexican footballer

Personal information
- Full name: Ángel García Hernández
- Date of birth: 1 September 2000 (age 26)
- Place of birth: Cuautitlán Izcalli, Mexico
- Height: 1.72 m (5 ft 7 1/2 in)
- Position: Midfielder

Youth career
- 2014–2020: UNAM

Senior career*
Years	Team	Apps	(Gls)
2020–2023	UNAM	14	(0)
2021–2023	→ Pumas Tabasco (loan)	26	(3)
2023–2024	Chihuahua	6	(0)
- * Club domestic league appearances and goals as of 9 April 2023

Ángel García Hernández (born 1 September 2000) is a Mexican professional footballer who plays as a midfielder.

== Career statistics ==
=== Club ===
As of 9 April 2023

Club	Season	League			Cup		Continental		Other		Total	
Club	Season	Division	Apps	Goals	Apps	Goals	Apps	Goals	Apps	Goals	Apps	Goals
UNAM	2020–21	Liga MX	12	0	–		–		–		12	0
UNAM	2021–22	Liga MX	2	0	–		–		–		2	0
UNAM	Total		14	0	0	0	0	0	0	0	14	0
Pumas Tabasco (loan)	2020–21	Liga de Expansión MX	11	1	—		—		—		11	1
Pumas Tabasco (loan)	2021–22	Liga de Expansión MX	12	1	—		—		—		12	1
Pumas Tabasco (loan)	2022–23	Liga de Expansión MX	3	1	—		—		—		3	1
Pumas Tabasco (loan)	Total		26	3	—		—		—		26	3
Career total			40	3	0	0	0	0	0	0	40	3
