= Carlos García (gymnast) =

Cuban gymnast

Carlos Garcia
- Full name: Carlos García Martínez
- Born: 11 September 1942 (age 83)

Gymnastics career
- Discipline: Men's artistic gymnastics
- Country represented: Cuba

Carlos García Martínez (born 11 September 1942) is a Cuban gymnast. He competed in eight events at the 1964 Summer Olympics.
