= Pablo Garcia =

Pablo Garcia may refer to:

== Sports ==
- Pablo García (baseball) (1923–1997), Cuban professional baseball player
- Pablo García (basketball player) (born 1946), Cuban basketball player
- Pablo García (luger) (born 1967), Spanish luger
- Pablo García (footballer, born 1977), Uruguayan football manager and former defensive midfielder
- Pablo García (footballer, born 1985), Spanish football left-back for Huracán Balazote
- Pablo García (basketball coach) (born 1989), Spanish basketball coach
- Pablo García (footballer, born 1999), Uruguayan football midfielder for San Martin SJ
- Pablo García (footballer, born 2000), Spanish football left back for Sporting Gijón
- Pablo García (footballer, born 2006), Spanish football winger for Racing de Santander

== Others ==
- Pablo García Baena (1921–2018), Spanish poet
- Pablo Marcano García (born 1952), Puerto Rican painter
- Pablo García Pérez de Lara (born 1970), Spanish filmmaker
- Pablo García (musician) (born 1976), Spanish guitarist and member of the band WarCry
- Pablo P. Garcia (1925–2021), Filipino politician
- Pablo John Garcia (born 1967), his son, Filipino politician
- Pablo García Cejas (born 1982), Uruguayan serial killer

== See also ==
- Juan Pablo García (born 1981), Mexican footballer
- Juan Pablo García (racing driver) (born 1987), Mexican racing driver
