= Joseph Garcia =

Joseph Garcia may refer to:

- Joseph Garcia (Gibraltarian politician) (born 1967), Gibraltarian historian and politician
- Joseph Garcia (American politician) (born 1957), 48th Lieutenant Governor of Colorado
- Joseph Andre Garcia (born 1999), Filipino child actor
- Joseph Christopher Garcia (1971–2018), escaped convict of the Texas Seven

== See also ==
- Joe Garcia (disambiguation)
