= Marta García =

Marta or Martha García may refer to:

== Politics ==
- Martha Garcia (Arizona politician), American politician
- Martha Garcia (New Mexico politician), American politician
- Martha García Müller (born 1946), Mexican politician

== Sport ==
- Marta García (racing driver) (born 2000), Spanish racing driver
- Marta García (runner) (born 1998), Spanish middle- and long-distance runner
- Marta García (skater) (born 1993), Spanish figure skater
- Marta García (weightlifter) (born 2004), Spanish weightlifter
- Marta García Martín (born 2000), Spanish chess player
- Marta Estévez García (born 1997), Luxembourgish footballer
- Marta Linares García (born 1986), Spanish rhythmic gymnast
- Martha García (rower) (born 1965), Mexican rower

== Others ==
- Marta García (dancer) (1949–2017), Cuban ballet dancer
