= Ryan Garcia (disambiguation) =

Ryan Garcia (born 1998) is an American boxer.

Ryan Garcia may also refer to:

- RR Garcia (born 1990), Filipino basketball player
- Ryan Garcia (baseball) (born 1998), American baseball player
