= Raúl García =

Raúl García may refer to:

== Politicians ==
- Raúl Roa García (1907–1982), Cuban intellectual, politician and diplomat
- Raúl García Velázquez (1946–2009), Mexican congressman
- Raúl García Vivián (born 1961), Mexican congressman

== Sportspeople ==
=== Association football ===
- Raúl García (footballer, born 1959), Peru international left-back
- Raúl García (footballer, born 1962) (1962–2018), El Salvador international goalkeeper
- Raúl García (footballer, born 1976), Spanish defender
- Raúl García (footballer, born 1980), Spanish centre-back
- Raúl García (footballer, born 1986), Spain international midfielder
- Raúl García (footballer, born 1989), Spanish left-back
- Raúl García (footballer, born 2000), Spanish forward

=== Other sports ===
- Raúl García (basketball) (1924–2013), Cuban Olympic basketball player
- Raúl García (swimmer) (1930–2020), Cuban Olympic swimmer
- Raúl García (wrestler) (born 1943), Mexican Olympic wrestler
- Raül García Paolicchi (born 1952), Andorran chess player
- Raúl García (field hockey) (born 1959), Cuban Olympic hockey player
- Raúl García Castán (born 1970), Spanish mountain runner and sky runner
- Raúl García (boxer) (born 1982), Mexican professional boxer

== Fictional people ==
- Raul Garcia (The Messengers), fictional character
