= Carlos García (Swedish footballer) =

Swedish footballer

Personal information
- Full name: Carlos Wilhelm García Ambrosiani
- Date of birth: 17 January 1993 (age 33)
- Place of birth: Bromma, Stockholm, Sweden
- Height: 1.84 m (6 ft 0 in)
- Position: Defender

Youth career
- 1998-2001: Ängby
- 2001-2006: Brommapojkarna
- 2006-2009: Djurgården
- 2010–2012: Juventus

Senior career*
Years	Team	Apps	(Gls)
2012–2013	Juventus	0	(0)
2012–2013	→ Perugia (loan)	5	(0)
2013–2015	Parma	0	(0)
2013	→ Brønshøj (loan)	2	(0)
2014	→ Jönköpings Södra (loan)	13	(1)
2015	Huddinge	12	(0)
2016–2020	Brage	84	(3)

International career
2008–2010	Sweden U17	18	(0)
2011	Sweden U19	11	(0)
- * Club domestic league appearances and goals as of 15 November 2019

Carlos Wilhelm García Ambrosiani (born 17 January 1993), known as Carlos García, is a Swedish former professional footballer who play last played for IK Brage in Superettan.

== Biography ==
García started his youth career at Stockholm, capital of Sweden, for Ängby and then Djurgården. On 22 January 2010 he was signed by Italian football giants Juventus for €250,000, plus €200,000 bonuses. In 2012, he was signed by Perugia in a temporary deal.

=== Parma ===
On 2 September 2013, García was sold from Juventus to Parma for €500,000. in a 2-year contract. García immediately left for Danish club Brønshøj in a temporary deal.

On 26 February 2014 García returned to Sweden for J-Södra.

=== Huddinge ===
On 9 July 2015 García signed a contract with Huddinge on a free transfer.

== Personal life ==
Born in Sweden, García is of Nicaraguan descent
