= Carlos M. García Zambrana =

Puerto Rican politician (born 1983)

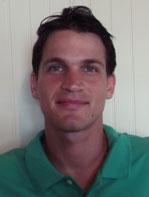

Minority spokesman for the Puerto Rican Independence Party in San Germán

Personal details
- Born: August 22, 1983 (age 43) Ponce, Puerto Rico
- Party: Puerto Rican Independence Party (PIP)
- Spouse: Carmen V. Cruz Velez
- Education: University of Puerto Rico; Interamerican University
- Occupation: Politician

Carlos M. García Zambrana (born August 22, 1983) is minority spokesman for the Puerto Rican Independence Party as an elected official for the San Germán, Puerto Rico municipal assembly.

Aside from García's responsibilities with the municipal assembly, he currently serves as Vice President for the New Life Christian Academy.

In 2012, García ran as the Puerto Rican Independence Party candidate for mayor of San Germán, Puerto Rico.
