= Victor Garcia =

Victor Garcia may refer to:

- Víctor García de la Concha (born 1934), Spanish philologist and writer
- Victor Garcia (director) (1934–1982), Argentine stage director
- Víctor García (cyclist) (born 1981), Spanish cyclist
- Víctor García (footballer, born May 1994), Spanish footballer
- Víctor García (footballer, born June 1994), Venezuelan footballer
- Víctor García (footballer, born 1995), Salvadoran footballer
- Víctor García (footballer, born 1997), Spanish footballer
- Víctor García Garzena (1913–1986), Chilean lawyer and politician
- Víctor García León (born 1976), Spanish filmmaker
- Víctor García (Mexican singer) (born 1975), Mexican singer and actor
- Víctor García Mingo (born 2003), Spanish footballer
- Víctor García (racing driver) (born 1990), Spanish driver
- Víctor García (runner) (born 1985), Spanish athlete
- Víctor García San Inocencio (born 1958), Puerto Rican lawyer and pro-independence politician
- Víctor Garcia (Spanish director) (born 1974), Spanish film director
- Víctor García (Spanish singer) (born 1970), Australian-Spanish rock singer
- Víctor García Toma (born 1954), Peruvian lawyer and politician
- Víctor García Tur (born 1981), Spanish writer, winner of the Mercè Rodoreda Award in 2018
- Víctor García (volleyball) (born 1950), Cuban volleyball player
- Víctor García (water polo) (born 1953), Mexican Olympic water polo player
- Víctor Andrés García Belaúnde (born 1949), Peruvian politician and congressman
- Víctor Hugo García Rodríguez (born 1965), Mexican politician
- Víctor Manuel García Valdés (1897–1969), Cuban painter
