= Joaquín Riquelme García =

Joaquín Riquelme García (born in Murcia, Spain in 1983), is a Spanish viola soloist and member of the Berlin Philharmonic.

== Biography ==
Born in Murcia (Spain) in 1983, Joaquín started his music studies in Murcia, before moving to Madrid to study at the Madrid Royal Conservatory. Later he studied at the Berlin University of the Arts, where he was a student of Hartmut Rohde.

He was awarded prizes at the International Festival of Youth Orchestras (Murcia), the Tomás Lestán Viola Competition, the Seventh Concurso Villa de Llanes and the Carl Flesch Academy Prize. He is an active viola soloist and concerto engagements include the Vallès Symphony Orchestra, the Barcelona Symphony and Catalonia National Orchestra, the Orquesta Sinfónica de la Región de Murcia, the Symphony Orchestra of the RCSMM, the Spanish National Youth Orchestra and the Andorran National Orchestra

At 23 he was made joint principal viola of the Barcelona Symphony and Catalonia National Orchestra and in March 2010 he became a full member of the Berlin Philharmonic.
