= Cristina García =

Cristina García may refer to:

- Cristina García (journalist) (born 1958), Cuban-born American journalist and novelist
- Cristina Garcia (politician), (born 1977), American politician
- Cristina García Rodero (born 1949), Spanish photographer
- Cristina García Spínola de Brito (born 1976), Spanish journalist
- Cristina García (swimmer), (born 2001), Spanish swimmer
