= Ramón García =

Ramón García or Ramon Garcia may refer to:

- Ramón García (1990s pitcher) (born 1969), former Venezuelan-American baseball pitcher
- Ramón García (gymnast) (born 1940), Spanish Olympic gymnast
- Ramón García (TV host) (born 1961), Spanish celebrity, aka Ramontxu, famous for his role on TV on 31 December
- Ramón García (1940s pitcher) (1924–2001), Cuban baseball pitcher
- Robert Hanssen (1944–2023), KGB agent, used the alias Ramon Garcia
- Ramón Fernando García (born 1972), Colombian road racing cyclist
