= Héctor García =

Héctor García may refer to:

== Politicians ==
- Héctor García-Godoy (1921–1970), politician from the Dominican Republic
- Héctor García Ribeyro (1909–1963), Peruvian politician
- Héctor García García (born 1963), Mexican politician

== Sportspeople ==
- Héctor García (basketball) (1926–before 2004), Uruguayan basketball player
- Héctor García (Dominican Republic boxer) (born 1991), boxer from the Dominican Republic
- Héctor García (Argentine boxer) (1926–?), Argentine boxer

== Characters ==
- Hector Garcia, a character in the Zits comic strip
- Hector Garcia, a character in Mortified, an Australian drama series
- Hector Garcia, a character in the TV series Between

== Others ==
- Héctor García (guitarist) (1930–2022), Cuban-American classical guitarist and composer
- Héctor García Cobo (1923–2012), Mexican artist, member of the Salón de la Plástica Mexicana
- Héctor García-Molina (1954–2019), Mexican computer scientist
- Héctor P. García (1914–1996), Mexican-American physician
