= José Ros García =

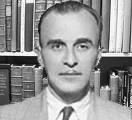
José Ros García, in the early years.

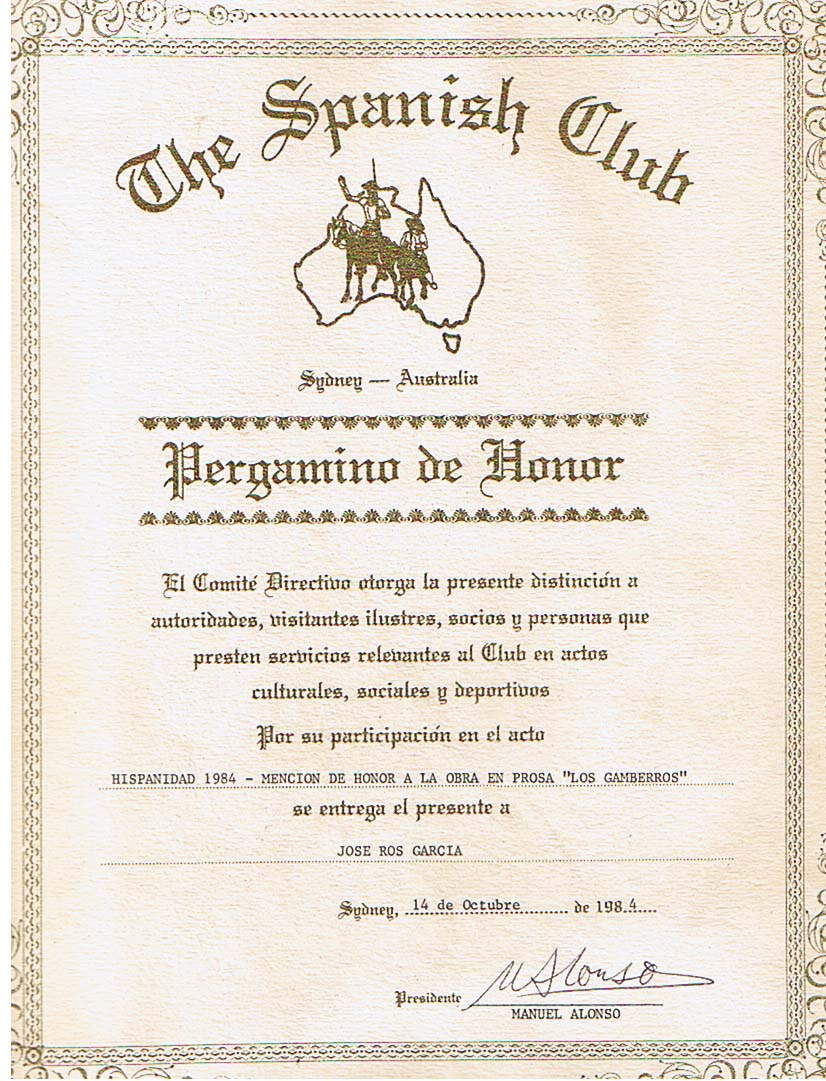
Literary Award won by José Ros Garcia in 1984

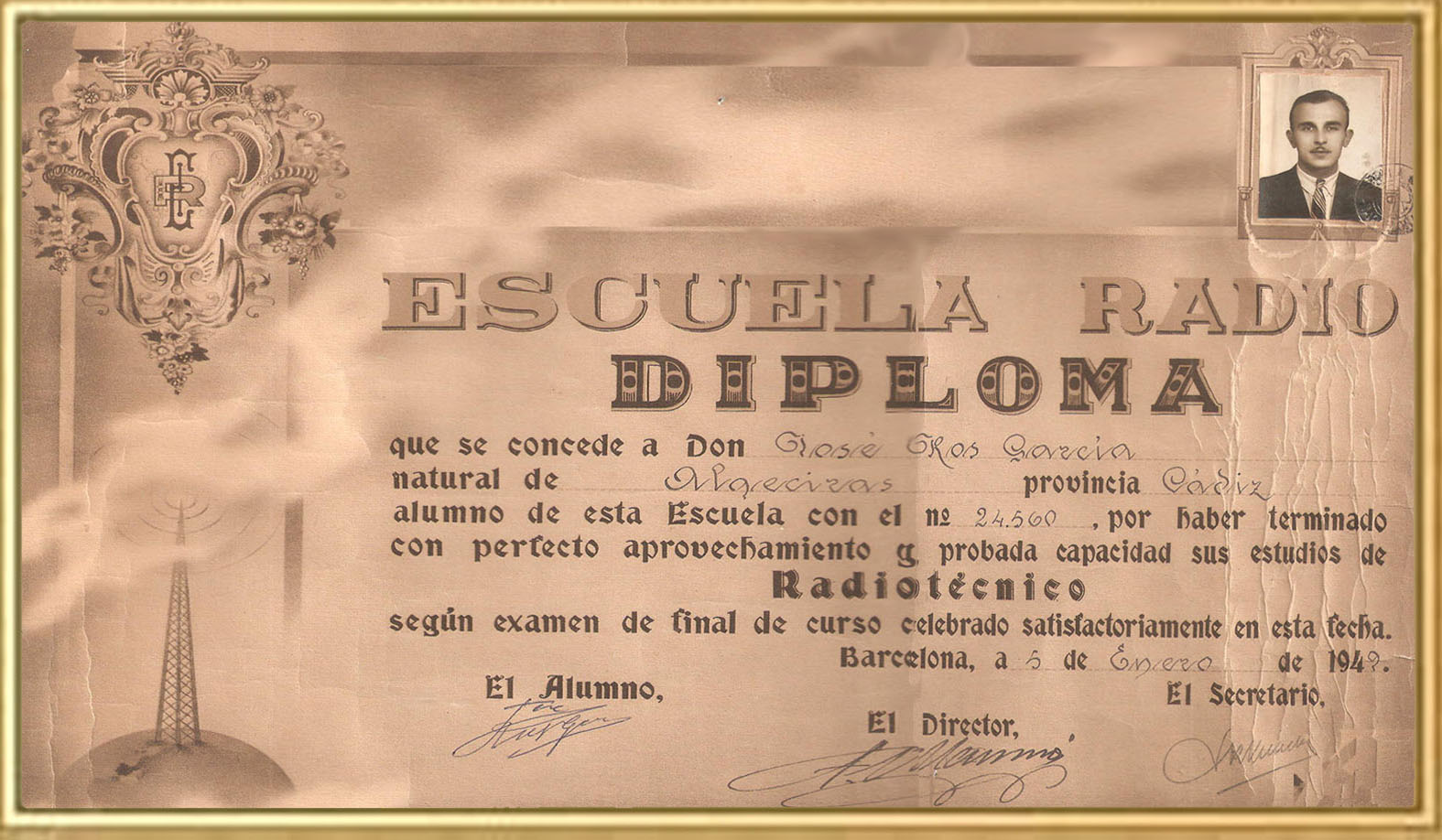
Radio Diploma (radio técnico) of José Ros García (1949)

José Ros García (1920 - 2001) was a Spanish-born poet who lived and worked for the latter part of his life in Australia. He originally trained as an electronics technician (radio diploma 1949) in Spain. He married his wife Carmen in 1952 (she died 2006) and they had two children together, Maria and Frank.

Born in Andalucía, he was an accomplished poet who published often under the pen name Francisco José. Many of his works were broadcast over the international Spanish radio station Radio Exterior de España under the auspices of renown broadcaster Rafaela De La Torre. He also contributed regularly in El Español En Australia, a national weekly newspaper based in Melbourne, Australia.

In October 1975, José won the 'Concurso Literario En Prosa' (Literary Competition in Prose) Carta De España, Hogar Español in Melbourne, Australia. In 1984 he won the prestigious Cervantes award and was awarded the 'Pergamino De Honor' (Parchment of Honour) following a Spanish literature competition in Sydney, Australia.

He died in April 2001 in Adelaide.
