= Martín García =

Martin Garcia may refer to:

== People ==
- Martín García (footballer, born 1976), Uruguayan footballer
- Martín García (footballer, born 1981), Colombian footballer
- Martín García (footballer, born 1998), Argentine footballer
- Martin Garcia (jockey) (born 1984), Mexican-born jockey in American horse racing
- Martín García (tennis) (born 1977), Argentine tennis player
- Martín García Óñez de Loyola (1549–1598), Spanish Basque soldier and Royal Governor of Chile
- Martín García Puyazuelo, Archbishop of Barcelona 1511–1521
- Fernando Martín García, Puerto Rican politician
- Martín García (Peruvian footballer) (born 1970)
- Martín García García (born 1996), Spanish pianist

== Places ==
- Martín García Island, island in the Río de la Plata, Argentina
- Martín García Island Airport

== Other uses ==
- Battle of Martín García for two naval battles involving Argentina
- Martín García canal dispute
