= Joaquín García de Antonio =

- Born: c. 1710; Anna, Valencia
- Died: September 15, 1779 (aged 68–69) Las Palmas

Joaquín García de Antonio [Sanchís] (c. 1710 in Anna, Valencia – 15 September 1779 in Las Palmas) was a Valencian composer and maestro de capilla. His cantatas are in the Italian style but his villancicos adopt a purely Hispanic vernacular style.
