= Pedro García (footballer, born 2000) =

Peruvian footballer

Personal information
- Full name: Pedro Daniel García Reátegui
- Date of birth: 16 February 2000 (age 26)
- Place of birth: Tarapoto, Peru
- Height: 1.75 m (5 ft 9 in)
- Position: Left-back

Team information
- Current team: Juventud Bellavista

Youth career
- Universidad San Martín
- Sport Boys

Senior career*
Years	Team	Apps	(Gls)
2018–2020	Sport Boys	33	(0)
2021	Alianza Atlético	0	(0)
2021–2022	Los Chankas	31	(1)
2023	Unión Comercio	1	(0)
2024	Los Chankas	1	(0)
2025–	Juventud Bellavista		
- * Club domestic league appearances and goals as of 16:05, 23 June 2024 (UTC)

Pedro Daniel García Reátegui (born 16 February 2000) is a Peruvian footballer who plays as a left-back for Juventud Bellavista.

== Club career ==
=== Sport Boys ===
García moved from Universidad San Martín to Sport Boys in 2018 and got his official debut for Sports Boys on 11 March 2018 against Deportivo Municipal. He played all 90 minutes in the game which they lost 2–3. García was permanently promoted to Sport Boys' first team in the summer 2018, after arriving to the club six months earlier. However, he only made 3 appearances for the team in the 2018 season. In the 2019 season, he played 17 games in the Peruvian Primera División, most of them from the first minute.

=== Later clubs ===
On 29 January 2021, García moved to fellow league club, Alianza Atlético. However he never made any official appearances for the club.

In August 2021, García joined Peruvian Segunda División side Los Chankas. Ahead of the 2023 season, he moved to fellow league club Unión Comercio. In the first half of 2024, García played for his former club, Los Chankas.
