= Miguel García (Spanish footballer) =

Spanish footballer

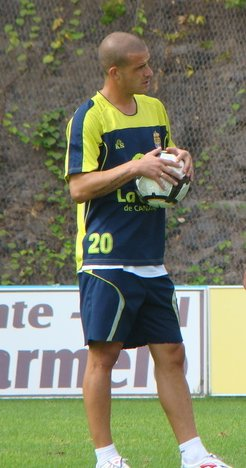
- García in training with Las Palmas

Personal information
- Full name: Miguel Ángel García Tébar
- Date of birth: 26 September 1979 (age 47)
- Place of birth: Albacete, Spain
- Height: 1.78 m (5 ft 10 in)
- Position: Midfielder

Youth career
- Albacete

Senior career*
| Years | Team | Apps | (Gls) |
| 1998–2001 | Albacete B | | |
| 1999–2002 | Albacete | 15 | (0) |
| 2000–2001 | → Deportivo B (loan) | 27 | (2) |
| 2002–2004 | Zaragoza B | 52 | (6) |
| 2004–2005 | Ponferradina | 35 | (4) |
| 2005–2006 | Castellón | 32 | (0) |
| 2006–2008 | Cádiz | 45 | (5) |
| 2008–2010 | Las Palmas | 63 | (1) |
| 2010 | Salamanca | 8 | (1) |
| Total | | 277 | (19) |

International career
| 1995–1996 | Spain U16 | 2 | (0) |
| 1998 | Spain U18 | 1 | (0) |
| 1998 | Spain U20 | 4 | (0) |
- * Club domestic league appearances and goals

Miguel Ángel García Tébar (born 26 September 1979), known as Miguel García, is a Spanish retired footballer who played as a defensive midfielder.

Ten years of his professional career – cut short at 31 due to heart problems – were spent in the Segunda División, where he collected 163 appearances for five teams.

== Club career ==
Born in Albacete, Castilla–La Mancha, García made his professional debut with hometown club Albacete Balompié. He could only make 15 first-team appearances in four seasons, which also included a short spell with Deportivo de La Coruña's reserves in the Segunda División B, on loan.

García then played three years in the third tier, with Deportivo Aragón and SD Ponferradina. In 2005, aged 26, he signed with CD Castellón of Segunda División, spending a further two seasons with another team in that league, Cádiz CF, arriving as the Andalusians had just been relegated from La Liga; in 2008, with the player only appearing in 14 matches (out of 42), it would drop down another division.

After two years with UD Las Palmas, the 31-year-old García joined UD Salamanca also in the second division. On 24 October 2010, during a home game against Real Betis (0–3 home loss), he suffered a cardiac arrest in the 57th minute and collapsed. He was attended by doctors of both teams, who revived him with cardiac massage and the use of a defibrillator; he left the stadium in a stable condition, subsequently undergoing tests at the Salamanca University Hospital.

After the event, in which his heart reportedly stopped beating for "about 25 seconds", García's club praised the "rapid and efficient intervention" of doctors from both Salamanca and Betis, credited with saving the player's life. Shortly before he left the hospital facilities, it was announced by the medical staff he would have to retire from football with immediate effect.
