= Benjamin Garcia (painter) =

Venezuelan painter (born 1986)

- Born: 1986 (age 39–40); Caracas, Venezuela
- Education: Instituto de Diseño de Caracas
- Known for: Painting
- Website: beng-art.com

Benjamin Garcia (also written Benjamín García; born 1986) is a Venezuelan painter based in Madrid, Spain. Trained in design and illustration in Caracas, he worked as a storyboard illustrator for animation and film before turning to painting full time. He is known for figurative portraits composed of overlapping, translucent layers of figures, and his work has been exhibited in the United States and Europe, including museum group shows at the Fort Wayne Museum of Art and the Lancaster Museum of Art and History and the solo exhibition Panacea at Thinkspace Projects in Los Angeles in 2018.

== Early life and education ==
Garcia was born in Caracas, Venezuela, in 1986. He was first drawn to comics, citing Moebius and Bill Sienkiewicz as early influences, and later discovered the painters Lucian Freud, Jenny Saville, and Kent Williams. At nineteen he enrolled at the Instituto de Diseño de Caracas, where he studied design and illustration and graduated in 2010.

== Career ==
After graduating, Garcia worked as a storyboard illustrator for animation and film productions and illustrated a novel. In the first half of the 2010s he left commercial illustration to paint full time. His layered portraits, including the series Flores, were featured by the art magazine Hi-Fructose in 2013, with further profiles in IGNANT, Cultura Colectiva, PanamericanWorld, Área Visual, Colectivo Bicicleta, and Arte a un Click.

From 2013 his work appeared in group exhibitions, including shows at Abend Gallery in Denver (2015), Below the Surface at Corey Helford Gallery in Los Angeles (2016), POW! WOW! Hawaii (2016), LAX / ORD at Vertical Gallery in Chicago (2016), and the SCOPE Miami Beach art fair with Thinkspace Projects (2017). His work was included in two museum group exhibitions organized with Thinkspace: Juxtapozed at the Fort Wayne Museum of Art in Fort Wayne, Indiana (2017), and The New Vanguard II at the Lancaster Museum of Art and History in Lancaster, California (2018). In September 2018, Thinkspace Projects in Culver City, California, presented Panacea, a solo exhibition of Garcia's paintings in the gallery's project room. The works depicted figures in states of transformation, and Garcia said the series drew on his experience of leaving Venezuela and being separated from family and friends.

Garcia left Venezuela in the 2010s, living in Bogotá, Colombia, in the middle of the decade before settling in Madrid. His later group exhibitions include LAX / SFO Pt. III at Heron Arts in San Francisco (2019), covered by Juxtapoz, LAX / ORD II, curated by Thinkspace at Vertical Gallery in Chicago (2019), and two 2020 exhibitions at Kirk Gallery in Aalborg, Denmark: At the Edge of Realism and Surrounded, the latter with Jacob Brostrup and Remus Grecu. He is represented by Abend Gallery in Denver.

== Style ==
Garcia paints primarily in acrylic and oil on canvas. His portraits layer transparent, overlapping images in a manner that has been compared to veils, and his work has been described as dreamlike and subtly dark, concerned with identity and the divided ego. Cultura Colectiva noted a tension between violence and delicacy in his expressive handling of predominantly female figures. While painting he consults digital reference images on screen, and he has published time lapse videos of his process, a practice cited in a 2018 article in the University of São Paulo journal Extraprensa.

== Selected exhibitions ==
- 2013: Novísimos, La Ventana Artkao gallery (group)
- 2015: Edge of Realism and the 25th Annual Miniatures Show, Abend Gallery, Denver (group)
- 2016: Below the Surface, Corey Helford Gallery, Los Angeles (group)
- 2016: POW! WOW! Hawaii (group)
- 2016: LAX / ORD, Vertical Gallery, Chicago (group)
- 2017: Juxtapozed, Fort Wayne Museum of Art, Fort Wayne, Indiana (group)
- 2017: SCOPE Miami Beach, with Thinkspace Projects (group)
- 2018: The New Vanguard II, Lancaster Museum of Art and History, Lancaster, California (group)
- 2018: Panacea, Thinkspace Projects, Culver City (solo)
- 2019: LAX / SFO Pt. III, Heron Arts, San Francisco (group)
- 2019: LAX / ORD II, Vertical Gallery, Chicago (group)
- 2020: At the Edge of Realism, Kirk Gallery, Aalborg (group)
- 2020: Surrounded, Kirk Gallery, Aalborg, with Jacob Brostrup and Remus Grecu (group)
