= Alejo García (disambiguation) =

Alejo García was a Portuguese-born explorer and conquistador.

Alejo García may also refer to:

- Alejo García Conde, 19th century governor of the Viceroyalty of New Spain
- Alejo García Pintos (born 1967), Argentine actor
