= Rafael García =

Rafael García may refer to:

== Politics ==
- Rafael Villicaña García (born 1958), Mexican politician
- Rafael García Tinajero (born 1960), Mexican politician

== Sports ==
- Rafael García Cortés (born 1958), Spanish retired footballer
- Rafael García (footballer, born 1974), Mexican footballer
- Rafa García (footballer) (born 1986), Spanish footballer
- Rafael Garcia (soccer, born 1988), American soccer player
- Rafael García (footballer, born 1989), Uruguayan footballer
- Rafael Garcia (footballer, born 1993), German footballer
- Rafael García, birth name of Mexican professional wrestler better known as Super Caló
- Rafa García (fighter) (born 1994), American-born Mexican MMA fighter
- Raphaël Garcia (born 1999), Canadian soccer player

== Other ==
- Rafael García Valiño (1898–1972), Spanish army officer in the Spanish Civil War
- Rafael García Granados (1893–1955), Mexican historian
- Rafael García-Herreros (1909–1992), Colombian priest
- Rafael García Serrano (1917–1988), Spanish journalist
- Felo García (Rafael García Picado, 1928–2023), Costa Rican painter
- Rafael García Bárcena, Cuban philosopher
- Rafael Rivera Garcia, artist
