= Gabriel García Román =

Mexican-American artist

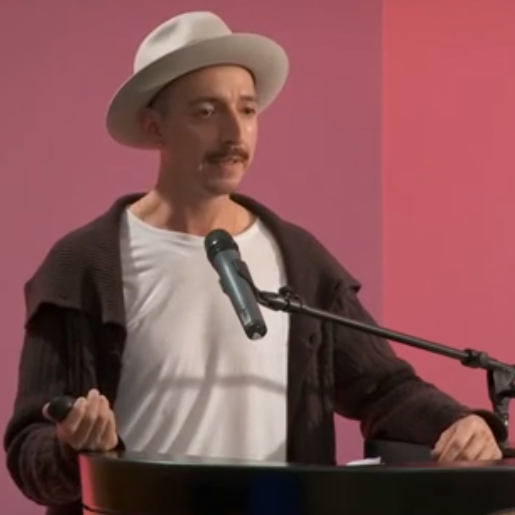
- Reading at the San Francisco Public Library in 2016
- Born: 1973 (age 52–53); Zacatecas, Mexico
- Education: City College of New York
- Website: www.gabrielgarciaroman.com

Gabriel García Román (born 1973) is a Mexican-American photographer and visual artist based in New York City. He is best known for his Queer Icons, QTPoC (Queer Trans People of Color) photography series.

== Biography ==
Born in Zacatecas, Mexico, in 1973, García Román and his family immigrated to the United States when he was two years old. He lived with his family in the San Francisco Bay Area for three years. At the age of five they moved to North Side of Chicago where he spent his formative years. Growing up in a Mexican working-class household he was always afraid of coming out to his family and hid his sexuality. This gave him a chance to blend into the background and observe life's smaller details. At the age of twenty-six he moved to New York to reinvent himself and live life.

== Education ==
García Román attended City College of New York where he received a Bachelors of Arts in studio art in 2012.

== Art works ==
García Román weaves and integrates many styles from religious imagery to popular culture into his work to combat bias and push photography. He grew up Catholic and was influenced by the painting and murals of the saints depicted in the cathedrals. These pieces had a strong connection with García Román and saw inspiration with them. He then combined this with his beliefs in the LGBTQ community in which he states they are the modern-day saints. His inspiration and the subjects he is drawn to speak highly of the diversity he brings to this series. The Queer Icon series caught many eyes and was highlighted in many news outlets like the National Public Radio (NPR) and the Huffington Post which sent a new wave of newfound diversity in these saint-like portraits.

=== Queer Icons (QTPoC) ===
==== Inspiration ====
In this series you can see the inspiration from the works itself as one of the most notable aspects are the halo-like accents in most of the portraits. The form in which each person takes in looking outward in various positions, colors, and depth in which these people are portrayed further exemplifies not only the saints but the portrait styles. García Román was inspired by the portrait styles from Renaissance and Christian Orthodox painting. Some notable inspirations for Roman are Renaissance artist like Jan van Eyck, Rogier van der Weyden, and Albrecht Dürer.

==== Subjects ====
García Román started to use friends and close acquaintances as the main focus in his art. As he entered this field, more subjects came to light through the means of social media like Tumblr and Instagram. The QTPoC community is very well connected so finding subjects was not much of a challenge. García Román asks the subjects to wear something regal and empowering to their sense of self which adds to the power of the art. His subjects are usually excluded from religious communities and yet here in his art they are depicted in a religious way that gives them the representation that is much needed.

== Exhibitions ==
Solo Exhibitions
Exhibitions	Organization	Location	Date
Gabriel García Román	Manifest Justice	Los Angeles	May 2- May 10, 2015
Queer Icons Workshop	LaGuardia Community College	31-10 Thomson Avenue Long Island City, Queens	May 7, 2019
Queer icons	Hudson Valley LGBTQ+ Community Center	300 Wall Street Kingston, New York 12401	February 2020
Queer Icons: A conversation with Gabriel Garcia Roman	LGBTQ Center, Academic Centers / Institutes, Office of Civic & Community Engagement	1834 Wake Forest Road Winston-Salem, NC 27106	February 28, 2017
Queer Icons procession	Leslie-Lohman Museum	New York, NY	2019
Divinity: Queer Icons	Middle Collegiate Church	New York, NY	2018
Queer Icons digital mural	Galeria de la Raza	San Francisco, CA	2016

Group Exhibitions
Exhibition	Organization	Location	Date
En Gender	CassilHaus	6301 Mimosa Dr, Chapel Hill, North Carolina 27514	October 1st – December 3rd, 2017
Portraits of Pride	Queer eye	X Gallery, 163 Malcolm X Blvd., Harlem	June 2018
Grafica America	Museum of Latin American Art	628 Alamitos Ave, Long Beach, CA 90802	2019
Visceral Notion	Center for Photography at Woodstock	59 Tinker St. NY 12498 Woodstock 845-6799957	February 11- March 2017
Parallax: Revisioning Queer and Trans People of Color in Photography	Photoville	New York, NY	2019
In this body of mine	Milwaukee Institute of Art & Design	Milwaukee, WI	2019
Criminalize This!: The Social Policing of Gender and the Criminalization of Queerness	Amos Eno Gallery	Brooklyn, NY	2019
The Portrait is Political	Gallery at BRIC House	Brooklyn, NY	2019

== Award, grants and residencies ==
- LMCC Workspace Residency – Lower Manhattan Cultural Counsel, 2019.
- NFA Artist Grant – National Association of Latino Arts & Culture, 2018
- Professional Printmaking Program, Self-Help Graphics Los Angeles CA, 2017
- Therese McCabe Ralston Connor Awards, 2008, 2009, 2010
