= Nito (footballer, born 1933) =

Spanish footballer

Personal information
- Full name: Joaquín García Paredes
- Date of birth: 8 November 1933 (age 92)
- Place of birth: Guardamar del Segura, Spain
- Height: 1.67 m (5 ft 6 in)
- Position: Forward

Senior career*
| Years | Team | Apps | (Gls) |
| 1957–1959 | Real Murcia | 26 | (10) |
| 1960–1961 | Levante | 4 | (0) |
| 1961–1962 | Villarrobledo | 11 | (1) |
| Total | | 41 | (11) |
- * Club domestic league appearances and goals

Joaquín García Paredes, nicknamed Nito (born 8 November 1933) is a Spanish former professional footballer who played as a forward.

== Career ==
Born in Guardamar del Segura, Nito played for Real Murcia, Levante and Villarrobledo. His younger brother Fernando, also known as "Nito", was also a footballer.
