= Ricardo Garcia =

Ricardo Garcia may refer to:

- Ricardo García (attorney), Public Defender for Los Angeles County
- Ricardo García (footballer) (1955–2007), Costa Rican footballer
- Ricardo Garcia (Spanish musician), Spanish flamenco guitarist
- Ricardo Garcia (volleyball) (born 1975), Brazilian volleyball player
- Ricardo García (pentathlete) (1921–1981), Mexican modern pentathlete
- Ricardo García (cyclist, born 1926) (1926–2008), Mexican cyclist
- Ricardo García (cyclist, born 1988), Spanish cyclist
- Ricardo García Mercet (1860–1933), Spanish naturalist and entomologist
- Ricardo Garcia (German musician) (born 1971), also known as Ricky Garcia, guitarist who played in the band LaFee

== See also ==
- Ricardo García Posada Airport, an airport in Chile
