= García =

García or Garcia may refer to:

== People ==
- García (surname)
- Kings of Pamplona/Navarre
  - García Íñiguez of Pamplona, king of Pamplona 851/2–882
  - García Sánchez I of Pamplona, king of Pamplona 931–970
  - García Sánchez II of Pamplona, king of Pamplona 994–1004
  - García Sánchez III of Navarre, king of Navarre 1035–1054
  - García Ramírez of Navarre, king of Navarre 1134–1150
- Kings of León/Galicia
  - García I of León
  - García II of Galicia

== Places ==
- Garcia, Tarragona, a municipality in Ribera d'Ebre, Spain
- García, Nuevo León, a municipality in Mexico
- Garcia, Colorado, an unincorporated town in the United States

== Entertainment ==
- Los tres García (English: The Three Garcias), Mexican film from the Golden Age of cinema

=== Television ===
- Los Garcia (English: The Garcias), Puerto Rican television comedy show the 1970s
- The Garcias, American television series
- ¡García!, Spanish television series

=== Music ===
- Garcia, a 1972 album by Jerry Garcia
- Garcia, a 1974 album by Jerry Garcia
- Garcia (band), a German Eurodance project

== Military ==
- USS Garcia (FF-1040), U.S. Navy frigate
- Garcia-class frigate, of the U.S. Navy

== Other uses ==
- Garcia (plant), a plant genus of the family Euphorbiaceae
- Garcia v. San Antonio Metropolitan Transit Authority, a US Supreme Court case

== See also ==
- Garcia Hernandez, Bohol, municipality in the province of Bohol, Philippines
- Padre Garcia, Batangas, municipality in the province of Batangas, Philippines
- San Pedro Garza García, suburb of Monterrey, Nuevo León, Mexico
- Diego Garcia, an atoll in the Indian Ocean used as a major military base by the United States
