= 2nd federal electoral district of Mexico City =

Federal electoral district of Mexico

Mexico City's 2nd
- Electoral district of the Chamber of Deputies of Mexico

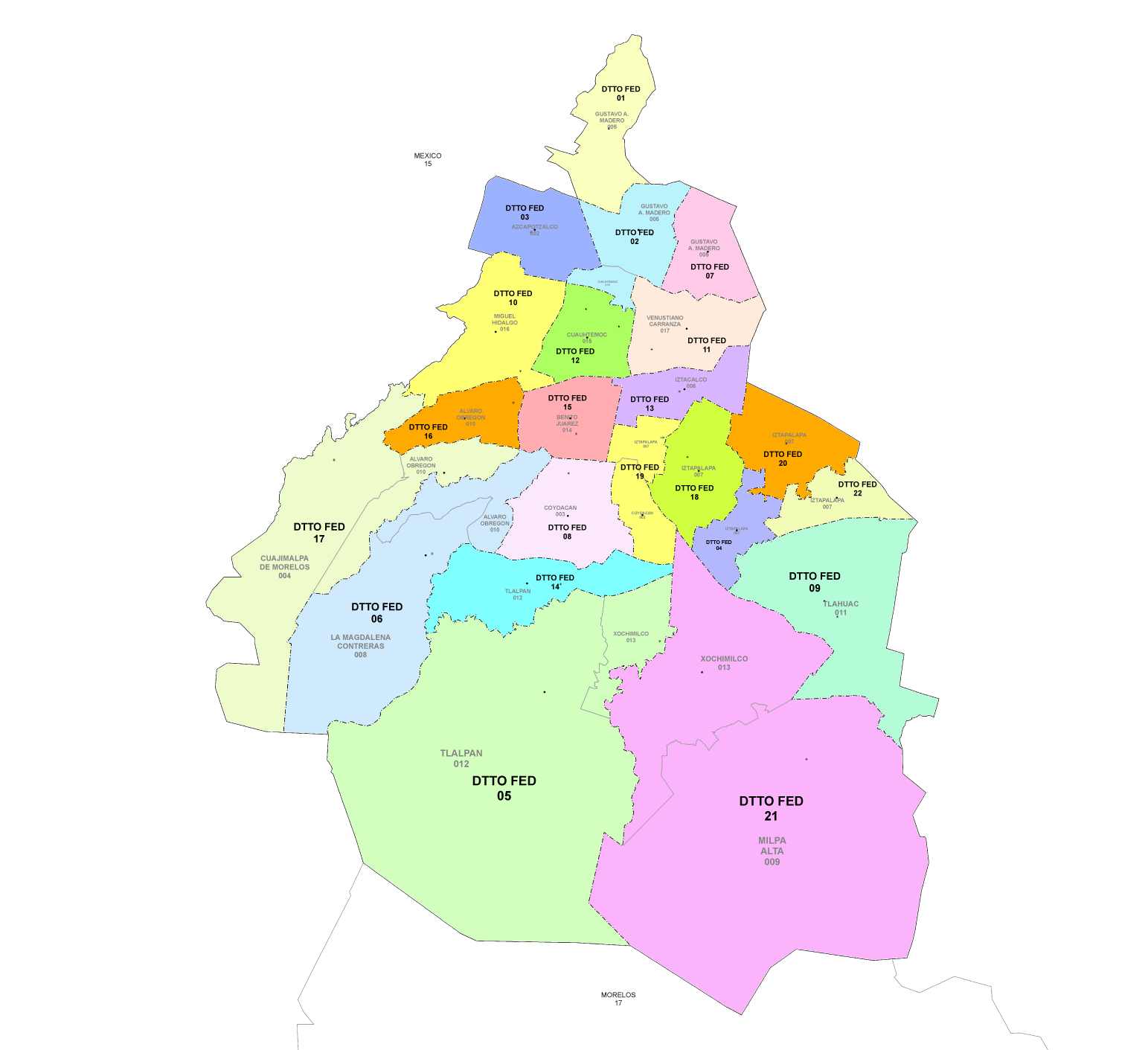
- 2nd district since 2023

Incumbent
- Member: José Alberto Benavides Castañeda
- Party: ▌Labour Party
- Congress: 66th (2024–2027)

District
- State: Mexico City
- Head town: Gustavo A. Madero
- Coordinates: 19°28′56″N 99°06′45″W
- Covers: Gustavo A. Madero (part), Cuauhtémoc (part)
- PR region: Fourth
- Precincts: 369
- Population: 451,517 (2020 census)

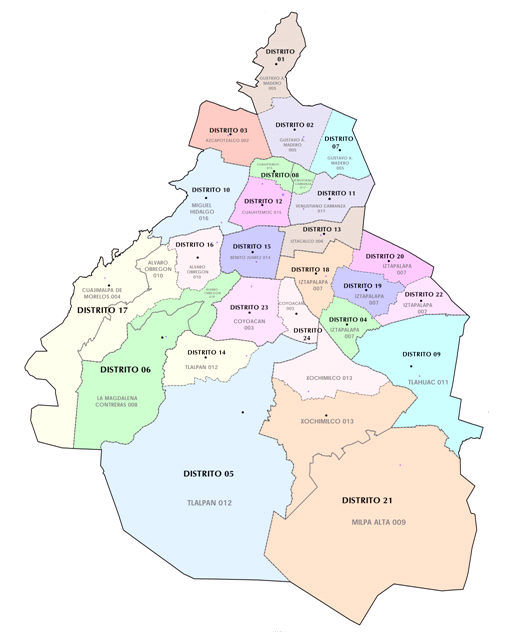
Mexico City under the 2017–2022 districting plan

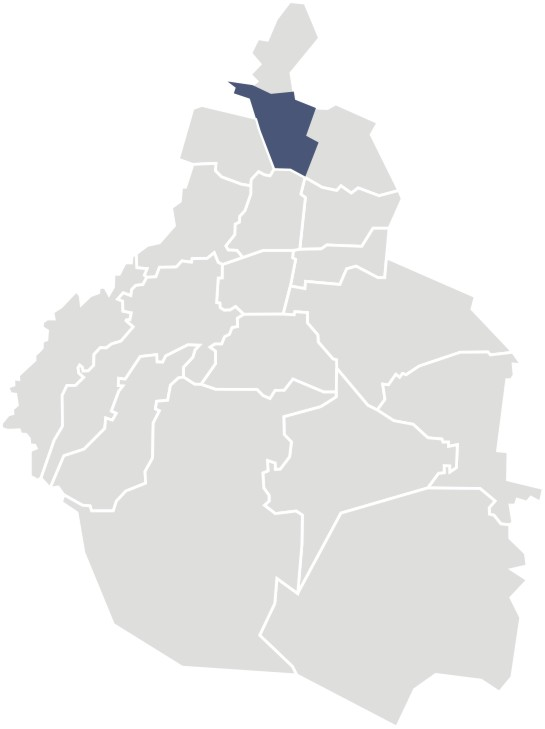
2nd district in 2005–2017

The 2nd federal electoral district of Mexico City (Spanish: Distrito electoral federal 02 de la Ciudad de México; previously "of the Federal District") is one of the 300 electoral districts into which Mexico is divided for elections to the federal Chamber of Deputies and one of 22 such districts in Mexico City.

It elects one deputy to the lower house of Congress for each three-year legislative session by means of the first-past-the-post system. Votes cast in the district also count towards the calculation of proportional representation ("plurinominal") deputies elected from the fourth region.

The current member for the district, elected in the 2024 general election, is José Alberto Benavides Castañeda of the Labour Party (PT).

== District territory ==
Under the 2023 districting plan adopted by the National Electoral Institute (INE), which is to be used for the 2024, 2027 and 2030 federal elections, the 2nd district covers 369 electoral precincts (secciones electorales) across the central portion of the borough (alcaldía) of Gustavo A. Madero and the northern portion of the borough of Cuauhtémoc.

The district reported a population of 451,517 in the 2020 census.

== Previous districting schemes ==
Evolution of electoral district numbers
	1974	1978	1996	2005	2017	2023
Mexico City (Federal District)	27	40	30	27	24	22
Chamber of Deputies	196	300				

2005–2022

Under both the 2005 and 2017 districting schemes, the district covered central and western portions of Gustavo A. Madero.

1996–2005

Between 1996 and 2005, the district covered central and western portions of Gustavo A. Madero and the eastern part of Azcapotzalco.

1978–1996

The districting scheme in force from 1978 to 1996 was the result of the 1977 electoral reforms, which increased the number of single-member seats in the Chamber of Deputies from 196 to 300. Under that plan, the Federal District's seat allocation rose from 27 to 40. The 2nd district covered a portion of the borough of Cuauhtémoc.

== Deputies returned to Congress ==
(Mexico) National parties
- Current
- PAN
- PRI
- PT
- PVEM
- MC
- Morena
- PAZ
- Somos
- Defunct or local only
- PLM
- PNR
- PRM
- PNM
- PP
- PPS
- PARM
- PFCRN
- CON
- PANAL
- PSD
- PES
- PES
- PRD

Mexico City's 2nd district
Election	Deputy	Party	Term	Legislature
1916	Lauro López Guerra		1916–1917	Constituent Congress of Querétaro
1917	Rafael Martínez de Escobar	PLC	1917–1918	27th Congress
1918	Jerónimo Hernández	PLN	1918–1920	28th Congress
1920	Rafael Martínez de Escobar		1920–1922	29th Congress
1922	Mariano Samayoa		1922–1924	30th Congress
1924	Guillermo Zárraga		1924–1926	31st Congress
1926	Joaquín de la Peña		1926–1928	32nd Congress
1928	Ernesto Verdugo	CI	1928–1930	33rd Congress
1930	Ángel Ladrón de Guevara	Institutional Revolutionary Party	1930–1932	34th Congress
1932	José Morales Hesse	Institutional Revolutionary Party	1932–1934	35th Congress
1934	Luis Enrique Erro Soler	Institutional Revolutionary Party	1934–1937	36th Congress
1937	Salvador Ochoa Rentería	Institutional Revolutionary Party	1937–1940	37th Congress
1940	Vacant		1940–1943	38th Congress
1943	Carlos A. Madrazo; Marcelino Iñurreta de la Fuente	Institutional Revolutionary Party	1943–1945; 1945–1946	39th Congress
1946	Lauro Ortega Martínez	Institutional Revolutionary Party	1946-1949	40th Congress
1949	José Tovar Miranda	Institutional Revolutionary Party	1949–1952	41st Congress
1952	Juan José Osorio Palacios	Institutional Revolutionary Party	1952–1955	42nd Congress
1955	Roberto Herrera León	Institutional Revolutionary Party	1955–1958	43rd Congress
1958	Joaquín del Olmo Martínez	Institutional Revolutionary Party	1958–1961	44th Congress
1961	Francisco García Silva	Institutional Revolutionary Party	1961–1964	45th Congress
1964	Arnulfo Vázquez Trujillo	Institutional Revolutionary Party	1964–1967	46th Congress
1967	José del Valle de la Cajiga	Institutional Revolutionary Party	1967–1970	47th Congress
1970	Mauricio Solano Martínez	Institutional Revolutionary Party	1970–1973	48th Congress
1973	Ángel Olivo Solís	Institutional Revolutionary Party	1973–1976	49th Congress
1976	José Salvador Lima Zuno	Institutional Revolutionary Party	1976–1979	50th Congress
1979	Ángel Olivo Solís	Institutional Revolutionary Party	1979–1982	51st Congress
1982	Rodolfo García Pérez	Institutional Revolutionary Party	1982–1985	52nd Congress
1985	Elba Esther Gordillo Morales	Institutional Revolutionary Party	1985–1988	53rd Congress
1988	Onofre Hernández Rivera	Institutional Revolutionary Party	1988–1991	54th Congress
1991	Rafael Farrera Peña	Institutional Revolutionary Party	1991–1994	55th Congress
1994	José Luis Martínez Álvarez	Institutional Revolutionary Party	1994–1997	56th Congress
1997	Martha Irene Luna Calvo	Party of the Democratic Revolution	1997–2000	57th Congress
2000	Luis Fernando Sánchez Nava	National Action Party (Mexico)	2000–2003	58th Congress
2003	Miguel Ángel García Domínguez	Party of the Democratic Revolution	2003–2006	59th Congress
2006	Javier González Garza	Party of the Democratic Revolution	2006–2009	60th Congress
2009	Rosi Orozco	National Action Party (Mexico)	2009–2012	61st Congress
2012	Manuel Huerta Ladrón de Guevara	Labour Party (Mexico)	2012–2015	62nd Congress
2015	Juan Romero Tenorio	National Regeneration Movement	2015–2018	63rd Congress
2018	Armando González Escoto	Social Encounter Party	2018–2021	64th Congress
2021	Maribel Villaseñor Dávila	Institutional Revolutionary Party	2021–2024	65th Congress
2024	José Alberto Benavides Castañeda	Labour Party (Mexico)	2024–2027	66th Congress

== Presidential elections ==
Mexico City's 2nd district
Election	District won by	Party or coalition	%
2018	Andrés Manuel López Obrador	Juntos Haremos Historia	55.2122
2024	Claudia Sheinbaum Pardo	Sigamos Haciendo Historia	51.0237
