= José Benavides =

José Benavides may refer to

- José Benavides (director) (1911–1945), Mexican screenwriter and film director
- José María Benavides (1945–2024), Spanish competitive sailor
- José Alberto Benavides (born 1970), Mexican politician
- José Benavides Muñoz (1929–2016), Peruvian politician, Minister of Economy and Finance
- José Benavidez Jr. (born 1992), U.S. professional boxer
