= Sex trafficking in Central America =

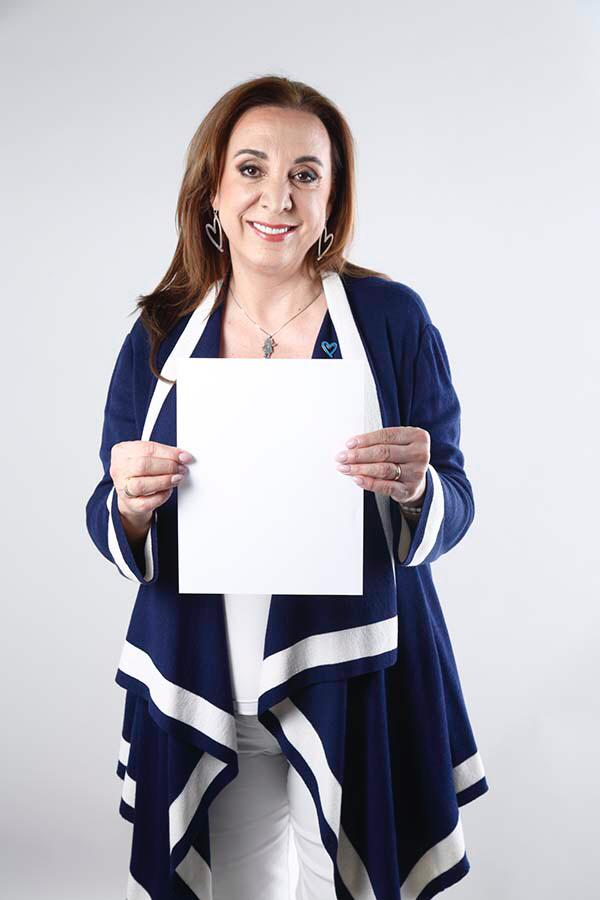
Rosi Orozco is a campaigner against sex trafficking in Mexico

Over time, there has been an increase in sex trafficking in Central America. Because of the lack of financials, work opportunities and studies, women and men see sex work as the solution to their problems. In addition, the living conditions, poverty, and gang violence are the reason as to why a lot of people have been coerced into sex trafficking. These countries are working with their government and other countries in order to create laws to fight against sex trafficking.

== Issues ==
Most of the people being sex trafficked are women and children. According to the United Nations' report, about 80% of the sex trafficking victims in Central America are women and girls. Women are coerced into sex trafficking because of the lack of food, clothes, shelter and employment. In addition, children are coerced into sex trafficking because of the lack of education, illiteracy, training skills, gang participation, homelessness and physical abuse. Men go into sex trafficking due to homosexuality and being transgender.

=== Violence ===
Violence has been a problem in the Central American Region for many years. As of 2018, El Salvador has the highest homicide rate amongst Latin America and the Caribbean. In El Salvador, there are about 52 homicides per 100,000 citizens. The violence rate is high due to the gang violence and corrupt government. The kinds of violent acts committed are torture, physical and sexual assault, and murder. The violent acts that the sex trafficked victims come from the police, johns, pimps, gang members, and their traffickers. In addition, there are clients that sexually and physically assault the workers. This can lead to the sex work being murdered. Due to how the sex workers and sex trafficked victims are viewed, the police doesn't consider these violent acts to be a crime and they don't further investigate. Many of these violent acts occur due to the machismo culture. In Central America, it is believed that men are better than women and children and that only their priorities and values should matter. A big factor of the violent acts are the Gangs and gang members in this region. Women are the main target of the sex trafficking gangs. Either they are trying to coerce them into joining sex trafficking or they are murdered. In Guatemala, about two women are murdered daily. In addition, gang members tend to recruit young girls between the ages of nine and fifteen. Gang members force these girls into sex trafficking by threatening to kill them and their family. In relations to sex trafficking, the young girls are coerced into selling drugs for the gang.

=== Poverty ===
Many of the countries in Central America, such as El Salvador, Guatemala, Honduras, and Nicaragua, suffer from poverty. The countries share economic, historical, and political characteristics within each other. About 70% of the Central American region lives below the poverty line. In El Salvador and Nicaragua 47% of their population is living in poverty. Secondly, Costa Rica has 23% of its population living in poverty. Guatemala has about 54% of its population living in poverty. Panama has 37%. Lastly, Honduras has 75% of its population living in poverty. This is because there is an unequal distribution of wealth amongst the people. Due to the issue of poverty, many sex trafficking victims are being coerced by getting paid Although, they aren't being paid a lot, they are still being offered more commission than the jobs in their countries.

=== Migration ===
For many years, there has been migration between the countries in Central America. For instance, about 8% of the Costa Rican population is made up of Nicaraguans. Amongst these countries, there are also migration movements within El Salvador, Honduras, Guatemala, and Belize Costa Rica and Belize tend to receive the women and children who were trafficked due to tourism growing. In addition, many women and children are trafficked within their own country and then they are sold to someone in another country. Not only are they migrating within the region, but there's also migrating to Mexico, Canada, and the United States. The migration to these other regions is illegal, especially when it's done by smuggling. About 34% of the sex trafficking victims are smuggled into the United States without being aware and 29% are given "fake jobs" as a way get them to come to the United States. Over the past years, there has been an increase in female migration. This is due to the search of job opportunities and wanting to reunite with their families. Sex traffickers tend to take advantage of this information. They promise the women a safe and better life away from the gang violence and government corruption. When it comes to smuggling people into the United States, the sex traffickers are quite aware of the immigration policies and practices. Although certain things they do are illegal, the border patrols and police officers are incapable of stopping them because of the lack of personnel, training, information, and corruption.

== Solutions ==
=== Laws/Law enforcement ===
To fight against sex trafficking, the Central American countries are working together with the United States government. The TVPA(Victims of Trafficking and Violence Protection Act of 2000) is a law designed to prevent human trafficking and to protect the victims and survivors of sex trafficking. Although this law is set in place, none of the Central American countries abide by the TVPA. El Salvador, Honduras, and Panama are ranked as Tier 2, meaning that although they don't meet the standards to stop sex trafficking, the countries are making an effort. Secondly, Guatemala and Nicaragua are on Tier 2 Watch list, meaning that they are making an effort to stop sex trafficking, but the country shows that they lack the amount of investigations they are doing. Lastly, Belize is the only country in Central America that is ranked tier 3, meaning that the country doesn't abide by the TVPA and isn't making an effort. In addition, the DHS (Department of Homeland Security) has been working with El Salvador, Guatemala, and Honduras to develop a proposal that will allow them to make laws regarding gangs and sex trafficking.

=== Organization ===
The organization "The Polaris Project" is an organization that works to stop sex trafficking along with labor trafficking. The Polaris Project works with victims so that the traffickers are held accountable for their actions. In addition, they are working to find ways to better communities and the government to help prevent sex trafficking. One of The Polaris Project focus is to help rebuild the lives of sex trafficking survivors. The Polaris project provides a National Human Trafficking hotline that allows victims and survivors to reach out when in need of help. In addition, they provide blog posts to inform people on the situations that are occurring around them. Lastly, The Polaris Project partners with the law enforcement and government to put things into action that will help combat sex and labor trafficking
