= Carlos A. Madrazo =

Mexican politician

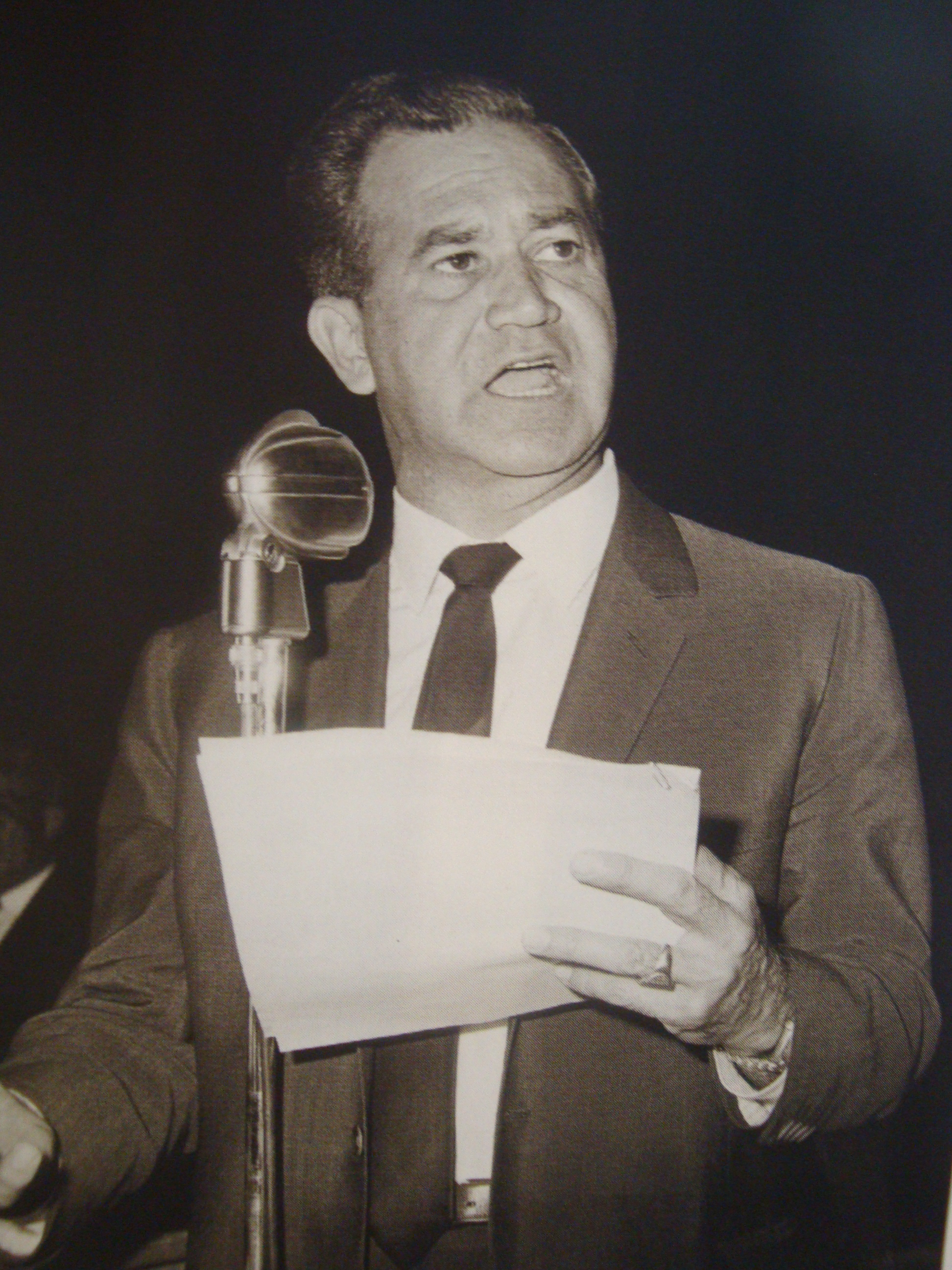

Governor of Tabasco
- In office 1 January 1959 – 31 December 1964
- Preceded by: Miguel Orrico de los Llanos
- Succeeded by: Manuel R. Mora

19th President of the Institutional Revolutionary Party
- In office 6 December 1964 – 22 November 1965
- Preceded by: Alfonso Corona del Rosal
- Succeeded by: Lauro Ortega Martínez

Member of the Chamber of Deputies for the Federal District′s 2nd district
- In office 1 September 1943 – 2 February 1945
- Preceded by: Salvador Ochoa Rentería
- Succeeded by: Marcelino Iñurreta de la Fuente

Personal details
- Born: Carlos Alberto Madrazo Becerra; 7 July 1915 Villahermosa, Tabasco
- Died: 4 June 1969 (aged 53) Monterrey, Nuevo León, Mexico
- Party: PRI
- Spouse: Graciela Pintado Jiménez
- Children: Roberto Madrazo, Carlos Armando Madrazo, Sergio Madrazo, Javier Madrazo, and Raul Madrazo
- Profession: Lawyer

Carlos Alberto Madrazo Becerra (July 7, 1915 – June 4, 1969) was a Mexican reformist politician and the governor of Tabasco from 1959 to 1964.

== Early life ==
Madrazo was born on the ranchería of Parrilla, in the state of Tabasco, to Píoquinto Madrazo López, a businessman, and Concepción Becerra, a schoolteacher. His childhood was marked by poverty, but his mother taught him the will to overcome adversity. He was an avid learner, studying at the José N. Rovirosa Institute, where his oratory skills led to his being selected to give a speech on Benito Juárez on the hero's birthday. Tabasco governor Ausencio Conrado Cruz and Tomás Garrido Canabal, president of the pro-Calles Central Resistance League, both present as the event, were impressed with his eloquence. Following the event, Garrido Canabal invited Madrazo on his statewide speaking tours, where he became known as "the young tribune".

== Education ==
Madrazo received a scholarship from the state government of Tabasco and studied at Juárez University where he organized the Confederation of Southeastern Socialist Students (Confederación de Estudiantes Socialistas del Sureste), which also drew support from peasants and labor. He also wrote for the newspaper Rendición.

He moved to Mexico City to continue his studies at the National Preparatory School, and in 1937 represented the Society of National Preparatory School Students as their president at the Second Congress of Mexican Socialist Students in Uruapan, Michoacán. In the same year, he earned his law degree from the National Autonomous University and joined the Party of the Mexican Revolution (PRM, later renamed PRI), becoming its president from 1938 to 1939. He also presided over the Confederation of Mexican Youth. In 1942 he was appointed General Director of Social Action of the Mexican Federal District (DF) and in 1944 became Director of the National School of Archivists and Librarians.

== Political career ==
In the 1943 mid-terms, he was elected to the Chamber of Deputies for the second electoral district of the DF, but as a supporter of Javier Rojo Gómez, who aspired to succeed President Manuel Ávila Camacho, he was targeted by Rojo Gómez's rivals, who implicated him in a scheme to disperse fraudulent Bracero Program cards to would-be migrants. As a result, he was imprisoned.

In 1952, Madrazo was named Chief of the Legal Department of the Sugarcane Commission. The same year his son Roberto Madrazo, who would later go on to represent the PRI in the 2006 Mexican presidential election, was born. In 1954 he wrote Anécdotas de Personajes Famosos ("Anecdotes of Famous People"). He represented the Tabasco state government in Mexico City, and supported Adolfo López Mateos's successful bid for the presidency, campaigning on his behalf. When López Mateos arrived in Tabasco, he proposed the development of the Southeast of Mexico as the country's prime source of income.

On April 20, 1958, Madrazo took the oath of candidacy for the office of Governor of Tabasco, and was elected in 1959. His governorship saw public improvements such as 100 kilometers of roadway and the opening of hundreds of schools and hospitals in addition to private developments such as milk rehydration and pasteurization plants and the industrialization of the cacao industry at Cárdenas.

Following his governorship, President Gustavo Díaz Ordaz appointed Madrazo to the presidency of the PRI, hoping that his energetic but loyal leadership would placate the youthful faction of the party without disrupting the old guard's control of the party. But Madrazo took his appointment as a mandate to democratize the party. He replaced old and corrupt party officials with dynamic members of the new generation, and tried to institute such reforms as open primaries for local offices, and a "Commission of Honor" to investigate and punish political corruption. These proposals lay bare the empty nature of Mexican "democracy" and earned him enemies within the PRI, and in 1965 he was forced to resign his leadership of the party.

After being relieved of his duties, he returned to his position as the head of the national librarian school. He continued to be active in the PRI, beginning "an unprecedented campaign of sniping at the government from the sidelines", whence he "gathered a considerable body of opinion behind him".

== Death ==
On 4 June 1969, he died in the Mexicana Flight 704 plane crash in the Cerro del Fraile mountain range in Monterrey, Nuevo León, with his wife Graciela Pintado.

== Bibliography ==
- La verdad en el "caso" de los braceros: origen de esta injusticia: nombre de los verdaderos responsables, ca. 1945. México.
- Anécdotas de Personajes Famosos, 1952. Mexico.
- Madrazo: voz postrera de la revolución; discursos y comentarios. Compiled by L. Darío Vasconcelos, 1971. Mexico, B. Costa-Amic.

== Citations ==
Preceded by Miguel Orrico de los Llanos	Governor of Tabasco; 1959–1965	Succeeded by Manuel R. Mora Martínez
Preceded by Alfonso Corona del Rosal	President of the Institutional Revolutionary Party; 1964–1965	Succeeded by Lauro Ortega Martínez
