= Institutional Revolutionary Party =

Mexican political party

Institutional Revolutionary Party Partido Revolucionario Institucional
- President: Alejandro Moreno Cárdenas
- Secretary-General: Carolina Viggiano Austria
- Senate leader: Manuel Añorve Baños
- Chamber leader: Rubén Moreira Valdez
- Founder: Plutarco Elías Calles
- Founded: 4 March 1929 (as PNR); 30 March 1938 (as PRM); 18 January 1946 (as PRI)
- Split from: Laborist Party
- Headquarters: Av. Insurgentes Norte 59 col. Buenavista 06359 Cuauhtémoc, Mexico City
- Newspaper: La República
- Youth wing: Red Jóvenes x México
- Trade union wing: Confederation of Mexican Workers
- Membership (2026): ▼819,103
- Ideology: Catch-all politics; Historical: Constitutionalism; Corporatism; Revolutionary nationalism; Social democracy
- Political position: Centre to centre-right
- Continental affiliation: COPPPAL
- Chamber of Deputies: 36 / 500
- Senate: 13 / 128
- Governorships: 2 / 32
- State legislatures: 90 / 1,123

Website
- pri.org.mx
- Politics of Mexico; Political parties; Elections; A: Also described as a big tent party.

The Institutional Revolutionary Party (Spanish: Partido Revolucionario Institucional, pronounced [paɾˈtiðo reβolusjoˈnaɾjo jnstitusjoˈnal], PRI) is a political party in Mexico that was founded in 1929 as the National Revolutionary Party (Partido Nacional Revolucionario, PNR). It became the Party of the Mexican Revolution (Partido de la Revolución Mexicana, PRM) in 1938 and the PRI in 1946. The party held uninterrupted power in the country for 71 years, from 1929 to 2000.

The PNR was founded in 1929 by Plutarco Elías Calles, Mexico's paramount leader and self-proclaimed Jefe Máximo (Supreme Chief) of the Mexican Revolution. The party was created with the intent of providing a political space in which all the surviving leaders and combatants of the Mexican Revolution could participate to solve the severe political crisis caused by the assassination of president-elect Álvaro Obregón in 1928. Although Calles himself fell into political disgrace and was exiled in 1936, the party continued ruling Mexico until 2000, changing names twice until it became the PRI.

The PRI governed Mexico as a de-facto one-party state for the majority of the twentieth century. Not only were all presidents of Mexico members of the PRI, all members of the Senate belonged to the PRI until 1976, and all state governors were also from the party until 1989. Throughout the seven decades that the PRI governed Mexico, the party used corporatism, co-option, electoral fraud, and political repression to maintain political power. While Mexico benefited from an economic boom which improved the quality of life of most people and created political stability during the early decades of the party's rule, issues such as inequality, corruption, and a lack of political freedoms gave rise to growing opposition against the PRI. Amid the global climate of social unrest in 1968, dissidents, primarily students, protested during the Olympic Games held in Mexico City. Tensions escalated, culminating in the Tlatelolco massacre, in which the Mexican Army killed hundreds of unarmed demonstrators in Mexico City. Subsequently, a series of economic crises beginning in the 1970s affected the living standards of much of the population.

Throughout its nine-decade existence, the party has represented a very wide array of ideologies, typically following from the policies of the country's president. Starting as a social democratic party during the Maximato, it moved leftward in the 1930s during the presidency of Lázaro Cárdenas, and gradually shifted to the right starting from 1940 after Cárdenas left office and Manuel Ávila Camacho became president. PRI administrations controversially adopted neoliberal economic policies during the 1980s and 1990s, as well as during Enrique Peña Nieto's presidency (2012–2018). In 2024, the party formally renounced neoliberalism and rebranded itself as a "center-left" party.

In 1990, Peruvian writer Mario Vargas Llosa famously described Mexico under the PRI as being "the perfect dictatorship", stating: "I don't believe that there has been in Latin America any case of a system of dictatorship which has so efficiently recruited the intellectual milieu, bribing it with great subtlety. The perfect dictatorship is not communism, nor the USSR, nor Fidel Castro; the perfect dictatorship is Mexico. Because it is a camouflaged dictatorship." The phrase became popular in Mexico and around the world until the PRI fell from power in 2000.

Despite losing the presidency in the 2000 elections, and 2006 presidential candidate Roberto Madrazo finishing in third place without carrying a single state, the PRI continued to control most state governments through the 2000s and performed strongly at local levels. As a result, the PRI won the 2009 legislative election, and in 2012 its candidate Enrique Peña Nieto regained the presidency. However, dissatisfaction with the Peña Nieto administration led to the PRI's defeat in the 2018 and 2024 presidential elections with the worst performances in the party's history.

== Overview ==
=== Profile ===
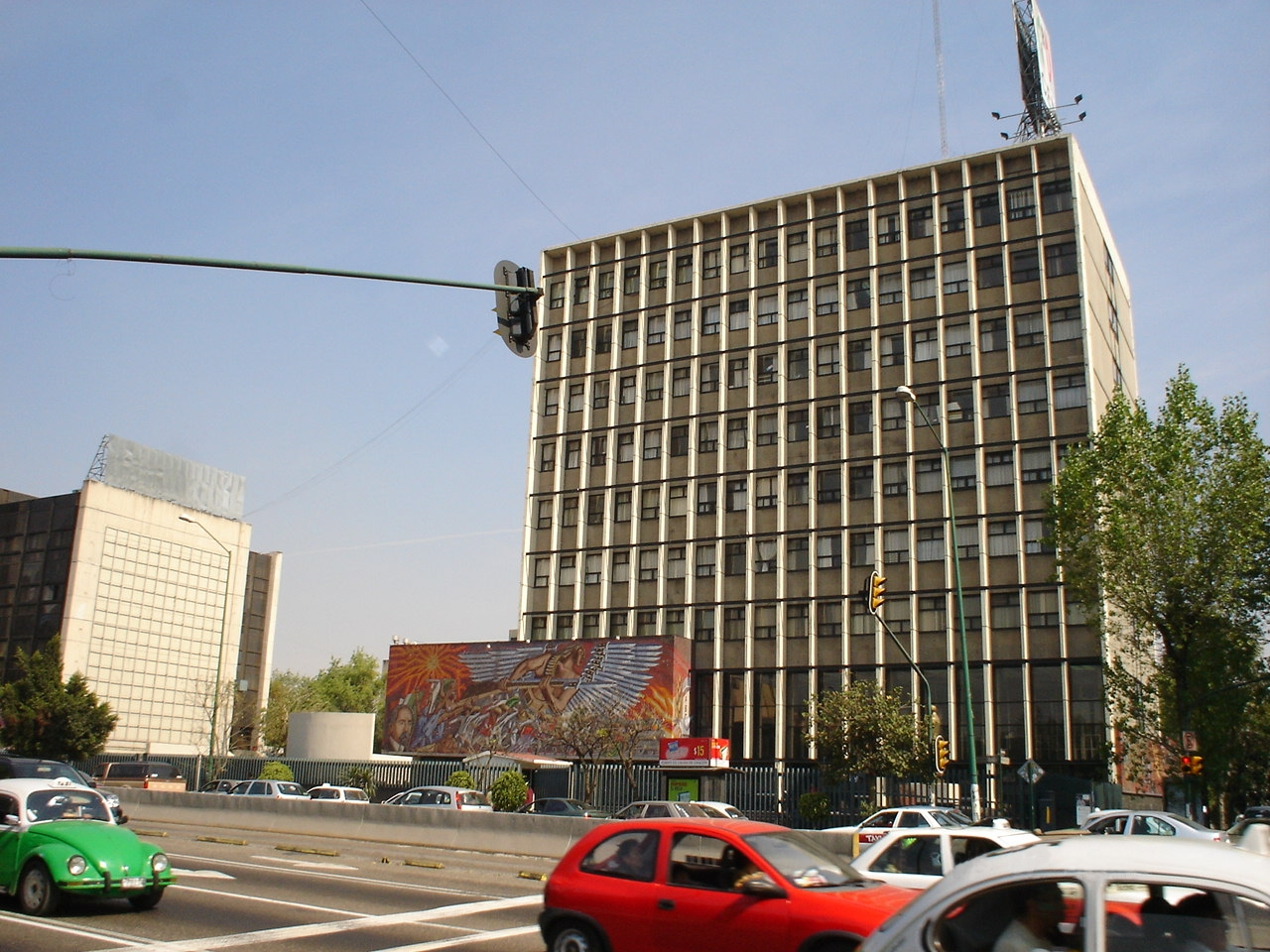
Central offices of the Institutional Revolutionary Party

The adherents of the PRI are known in Mexico as priistas and the party is nicknamed El tricolor (the Tricolor) because of its use of the Mexican national colors of green, white and red as they appear on the Mexican flag.

Formed from an amalgamation of the various ideologies of the Constitutionalists, the party originated on the centre-left of the political spectrum. It experienced a sharp, leftward turn during the presidency of Lázaro Cárdenas who instituted extensive reforms, including the nationalization of Mexico's petroleum and telecommunication industries. Furthermore his administration carried out extensive land reform and oversaw the largest campaign of land expropriation in Latin American history. His successor Manuel Ávila Camacho, presided over a rightward shift that escalated in the 1980s. At the start of the decade, the party moved to the centre-right and later right pursuing policies such as privatizing state-run companies, establishing closer relations with the Catholic Church, and embracing free-market capitalism. Subsequently, many left-wing members of the party abandoned the PRI and founded the Party of the Democratic Revolution (Partido de la Revolución Democrática, PRD) in 1989 following the controversial and fraudulent 1988 presidential election.

Some scholars characterise the PRI as a "state party" due to its dominance of domestic politics and the inextricable connection between the party and the identity of the Mexican nation-state for much of the 20th century.

According to Austin Bay, for more than seven decades, the PRI ran Mexico under an "autocratic, endemically corrupt, crony-ridden government". The elites of the PRI controlled the police and the judicial system, and were susceptible to bribery. During its time in power, the PRI became a symbol of corruption, repression, economic mismanagement, and electoral fraud; many educated Mexicans and urban dwellers in the 21st century worried that its return to power would lead to regression to its worst excesses.

The PRI became a full member of the Socialist International in 2003 until its expulsion in 2025. It was also considered a social democratic party.

According to one PRI figure, following the party's defeat in the 2000 presidential election, "It's a party that began as leftist and little by little moved toward the center. We will continue to occupy the same space."

=== Etymology ===
The name "Institutional Revolutionary Party" appears as an oxymoron or paradox, as the term "revolution" may imply the destruction of institutions. According to Rubén Gallo, the concept of institutionalizing the revolution refers to the corporatist nature of the party; the PRI subsumed the "disruptive energy" of the Mexican Revolution by co-opting and incorporating its enemies into the party's bureaucratic régime.

=== Party practices ===
There is a lexicon of terms used to describe people and practices of the PRI, that were fully operative until the 1990s. The most important was the dedazo, with the finger (Spanish: dedo) of the president pointing to the next PRI candidate for the presidency, meaning the president choosing his successor. Right up to the moment the president considered optimal, several pre-candidates would attempt to demonstrate their loyalty to the President and their high competence in their respective positions, usually as prominent members of the cabinet. Until the 2000 election, the party had no direct input into the president's decision, although he could consult with constituencies. The president's decision was a closely-kept secret, even from the victor.

The destape (the unveiling), that is, the announcement of the president's choice, would occur at the PRI's National Assembly (which would typically take place in November of the year prior to the elections), with losing pre-candidates learning only then themselves. Once the destape occurred, in general the members of the PRI would demonstrate their enthusiasm for the candidate and their loyalty to the party, known as the cargada. But the destape was also a delicate moment, for party unity depended on the losers acceding to the president's choice without public rancor or dissent. When President Miguel de la Madrid (in office: 1982 to 1988) chose Carlos Salinas de Gortari as the candidate in 1988, Cuauhtémoc Cárdenas and Porfirio Muñoz Ledo left the PRI to form a separate party, and Cárdenas challenged Salinas at the polls. The 1988 presidential election which followed is widely considered to have been fraudulent, and was confirmed as such by former president Miguel de la Madrid Hurtado and in an analysis by the American Political Science Review.

The term alquimistas (alchemists) referred to PRI specialists in vote-rigging. To achieve a complete sweep of elections – the carro completo ("full car") – the party used the campaign mechanism of the acarreo ("hauling"), the practice of trucking PRI-supporters to rallies to cheer the candidate and to polling places to cast votes – in exchange for gifts of some kind. The party would shift voting booths from one place to another, making it difficult for people to cast their votes.

== Presidential succession before the party: 1920–1928 ==
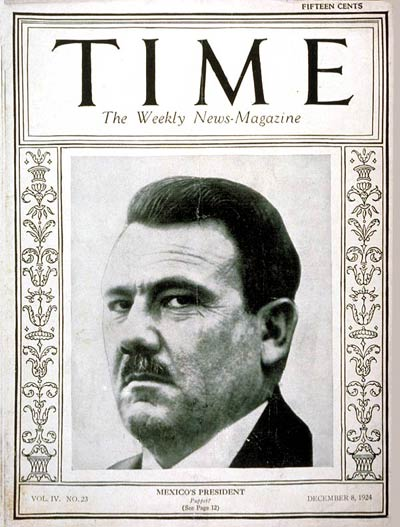
Plutarco Elías Calles on the cover of Time magazine in 1924

When it was founded in 1929, the party structure created a means to control political power and to perpetuate it with regular elections validating the party's choice. Before the party was founded, political parties were not generally the means in which to achieve the presidency. The creation of the party in the wake of the assassination of revolutionary general, former president, and in 1928 president-elect Alvaro Obregón had laid bare the problem of presidential succession with no institutional structures. Obregón was one of three revolutionary generals from Sonora, with Plutarco Elías Calles and Adolfo de la Huerta, who were important for the post-revolutionary history of Mexico. Their collective and then internecine struggles for power in the decade after the end of the military phase of the Mexican Revolution had a direct impact on the formation of the party in 1929.

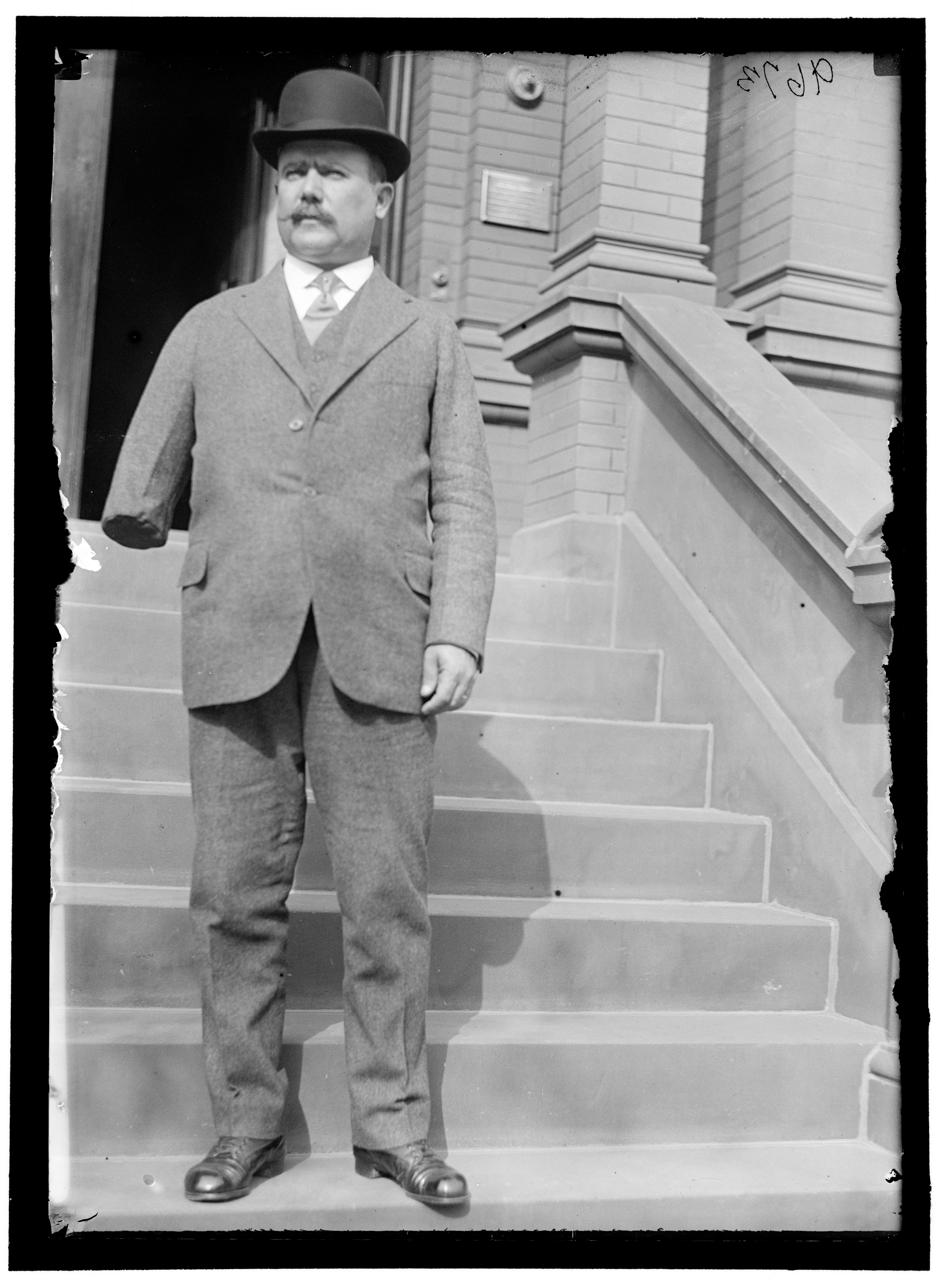
President Álvaro Obregón in a business suit, tailored to show that he lost his right arm in the Mexican Revolution and whose assassination in 1928 touched off a political crisis leading to the formation of the party

In 1920, the Sonorans staged a coup against President Venustiano Carranza, the civilian First Chief of the Constitutionalist faction that had won the Mexican Revolution. Carranza had attempted to impose his own candidate for the presidency, Ignacio Bonillas. Bonillas had zero revolutionary credentials and no power base of his own, with the implication that Carranza intended to hold onto power after the end of his term. This would have been a violation of the no re-election principle of post-revolutionary Mexico, which had its origins in the 19th century. With the support of the revolutionary army, the Sonoran generals' Plan of Agua Prieta successfully challenged Carranza's attempt to perpetuate his power; Carranza was killed as he was fleeing the country. De la Huerta became interim president of Mexico and Obregón was elected president for a four-year term, 1920–1924.

As Obregón's four-year term was ending, Calles made a bid for the presidency. De la Huerta, a fellow Sonoran, challenged Calles with a massive and bloody uprising, supported by other revolutionary generals opposed to Calles. The De la Huerta rebellion was crushed, but the outbreak of violence was only a few years after the apparent end of the Mexican Revolution, raising the specter of renewed violence. Calles succeeded Obregón in 1924, and shortly thereafter he began enforcing the restrictions on the Catholic Church in the year of 1917 Constitution, resulting in a huge rebellion by those opposed to such restrictions, known as the Cristero War (1926–29). The Cristero War was ongoing when elections were to be held.

Obregón sought to run again for the presidency in 1928 to succeed Calles, but because of the principle of no-re-election in the Mexican Constitution, the two Sonorans sought a loophole to allow the former president to run. The Constitution was amended to allow re-election if the terms were not-consecutive. With that change, Obregón ran in the 1928 election and won; but before his inauguration he was assassinated by a religious fanatic. Given that Calles had just served as president, even with the constitutional change to allow a form of re-election, he was ineligible to run. The founding of a national political party that had an existence beyond elections became the mechanism to control the power through peaceful means.

== Founding of the Party ==
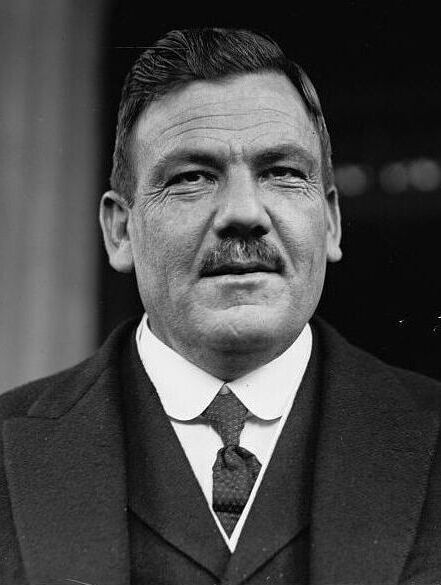
Emblem of the National Revolutionary Party (1929–1938) which was founded by Plutarco Elías Calles, President of Mexico from 1924 to 1928

The party had two names before taking its third and current name; however, its core has remained the same. It has been characterized as "in the 1960s as 'strongly dominant party', in the 1970s a 'pragmatic hegemonic state', and in the 1990s as a 'single party'". The close relationship between the PRI and the Mexican state has been examined by a number of scholars.

=== PNR (1929–1938) ===
"Today we have the chance, unique in many years, to go from the category of a country of caudillos, to a Nation of Institutions." - Plutarco Elías Calles, during his last Address to the Congress on 1 September 1928.

Even though the armed phase of the Mexican Revolution had ended in 1920, Mexico continued to encounter political unrest. A grave political crisis caused by the July 1928 assassination of president-elect Álvaro Obregón led to the founding on 4 March 1929 of the National Revolutionary Party (Spanish: Partido Nacional Revolucionario, PNR) by Plutarco Elías Calles, Mexico's president from 1924 to 1928. Emilio Portes Gil was interim president of Mexico from December 1928 until February 1930, while a political rather than military solution was sought for presidential succession.

The intent to found the party was to institutionalize the power of particular victors of Mexican Revolution. Calles was ineligible to run for president, since he had just completed a four-year term, because of the prohibition in the 1917 Constitution of re-election directly after serving a term as president. Calles sought to stop the violent struggle for power between the victorious factions of the Revolution, particularly around the presidential elections and to guarantee the peaceful transmission of power for members of the party. A conclave of revolutionary generals including Calles met to create a national party, forging together their various regional strongholds. They were not primarily concerned with ideology, but rather to hold power. Formally, the PNR was a political party, but it has been labeled a "confederation of caciques" ("political bosses").

The new party-in-formation did not contain any labor elements. At the time, the strongest labor organization was the Regional Confederation of Mexican Workers (CROM) controlled by Luis N. Morones, the political wing of which was the Laborist Party. Calles went to the Laborist Party convention and addressed the membership in a conciliatory fashion, but Morones launched into a diatribe against Emilio Portes Gil, the interim president of Mexico, for disrespecting Morones personally. It was a political gaffe for Calles, and he withdrew from the organizing committee of the party, but he turned it to his advantage in the long run, appearing to be a referee or arbiter in the party, and impartial senior statesman.

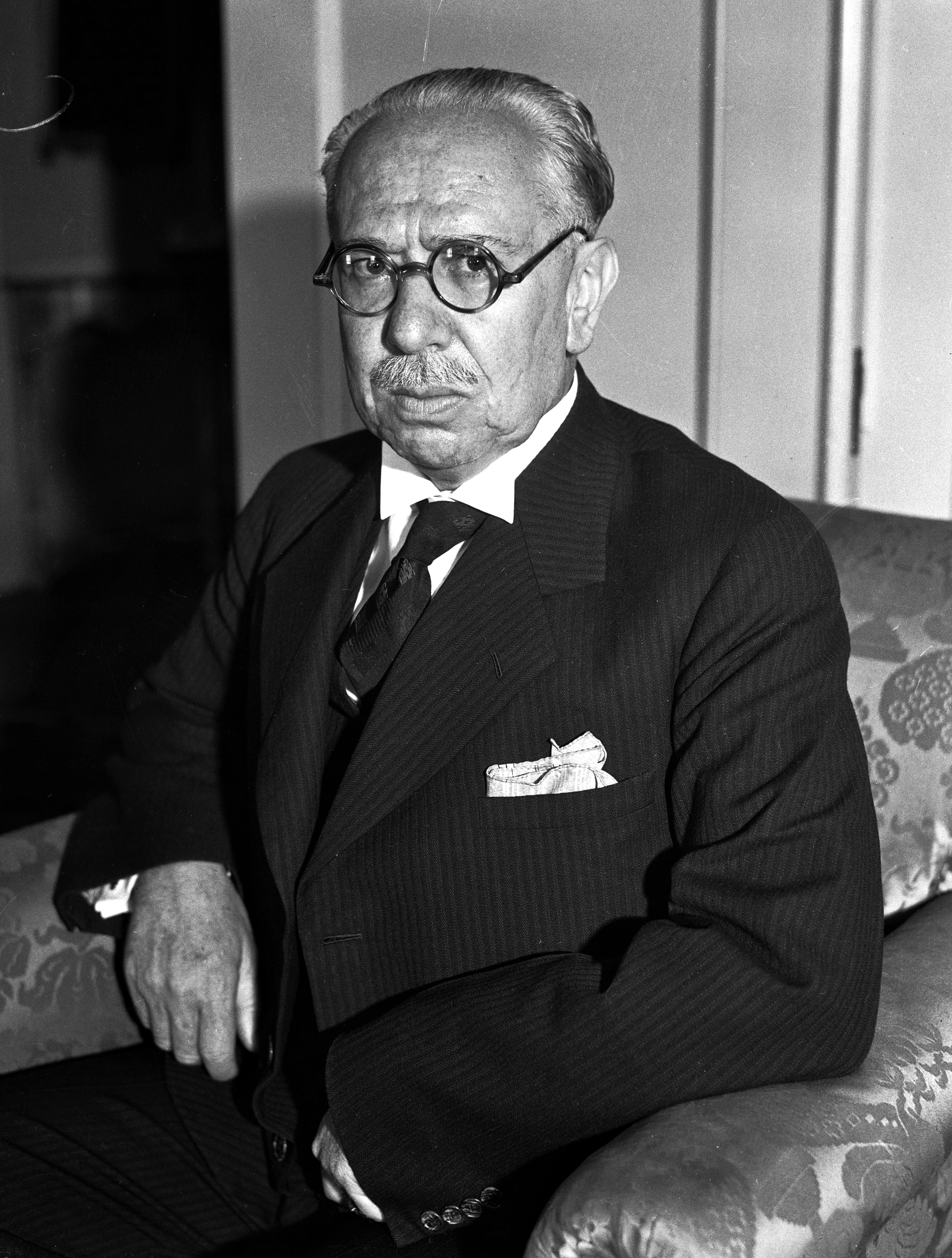
Pascual Ortiz Rubio, candidate of the PNR in the 1929 presidential election

The PNR incorporated other political parties under its umbrella, the Partido Radical Tabasqueño, of Tomás Garrido Canabal; the Yucatán-based Partido Socialista del Sureste, of Felipe Carrillo Puerto; and the Partido Socialista Fronterizo of Emilio Portes Gil, the current interim president. CROM's political arm, the Laborist Party, was not part of the coalition. The party developed a written set of principles and a platform that drew support from agraristas and workers in the Laborist Party. "The PNR is the instrument of political action by means of which Mexico's great campesino and worker masses fight to keep control of the public power in their hands, a control wrested from the landowning and privileged minorities through the great armed movement that began in 1910."

One possible presidential candidate for the PNR was Aarón Sáenz Garza, former governor of the state of Nuevo León, who was the brother-in-law of Calles's son, and was involved with Calles family businesses, but his political views were too far to the right of the PNR to be considered. Ideology trumped family connections. The choice fell to Pascual Ortiz Rubio, a revolutionary general who had been out the country, serving as Mexico's ambassador to Brazil, so had no political base in Mexico.

When the 1929 Mexican general election was held, the first political test of the newly founded party. Calles made a speech in June 1929 saying that while the Revolution had produced achievements in the economic and social spheres that in the political sphere it was a failure. He called for a "struggle of ideas" that invited the formation of new parties. The PNR had as its candidate Pascual Ortiz Rubio, but running against him as the candidate for the Anti-Reelectionist Party was the high-profile former Secretary of Education, José Vasconcelos. Vasconcelos had considerable support among university students, the middle class, intellectuals, and some workers from Mexico's northeast. According to historian Enrique Krauze, the 1929 campaign saw the PNR's "initiation into the technology of electoral fraud, a 'science' that later became its highly refined speciality." Tactics included breaking up political meetings and insults, to the extreme of murder of Vasconcelos supporters. Ortiz Rubio won the election in a landslide, but the results would likely have been different were the election clean. The party did largely contain the political violence of former revolutionary generals.

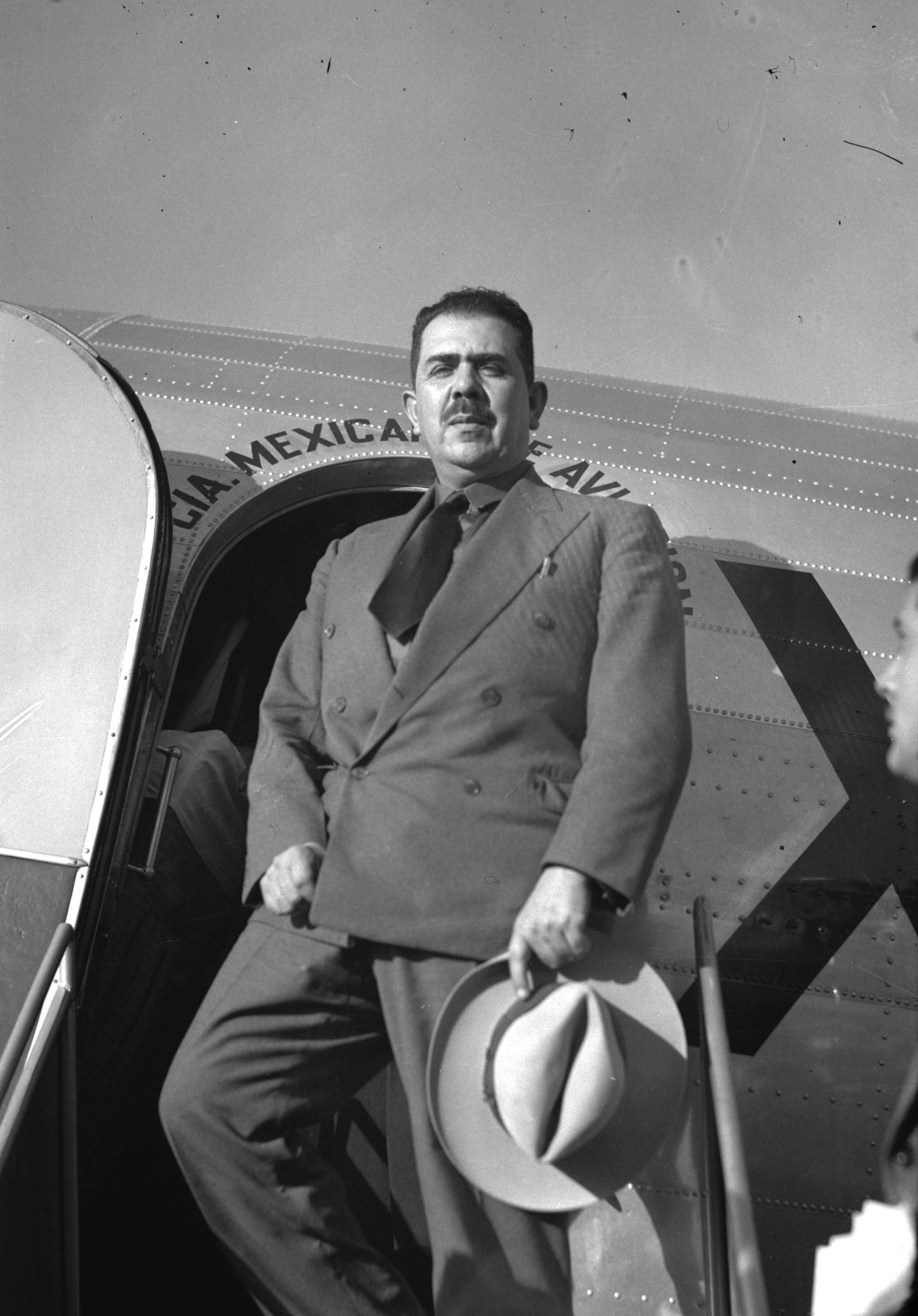
Lázaro Cárdenas in 1937

In the first years of the party's existence, the PNR was the only political machine in existence. During this period, known as Maximato (named after the title Calles gave himself as "Maximum Chief of the Revolution"), Calles remained the dominant leader of the country and Ortiz Rubio (1929–32) and Abelardo L. Rodríguez (1932–34), have been considered in practice subordinates of Calles.

Calles chose revolutionary general Lázaro Cárdenas as the PNR candidate for the 1934 Mexican general election. Cárdenas was originally from the southern state of Michoacan, but he joined the Revolution in the north, serving with Calles. The Jefe Máximo had no idea that Cárdenas would take his own path as he settled into the presidency. He had campaigned widely throughout the country, making a national reputation for himself and forming personal connections throughout the country outside the corridors of power. Calles had become increasingly conservative in his views, ending land reform for all practical purposes and cracking down on organized labor. Under Cárdenas, unions went on strike and were not suppressed by the government. As Cárdenas increasingly diverged in his thinking and practice from Calles, Calles sought to regain control. Cárdenas, however, had outmaneuvered Calles politically, gaining allies among labor unions and peasants as well as the Catholic Church. Calles had attempted to strictly enforce the anticlerical provisions of the Constitution, which led directly to conflict with the Catholic Church and its loyalists, so that in the conflict between the two generals, the Church sided with Cárdenas. Cárdenas had Calles arrested along with many of his allies, exiling the former president to the United States.

=== PRM (1938–1946) ===
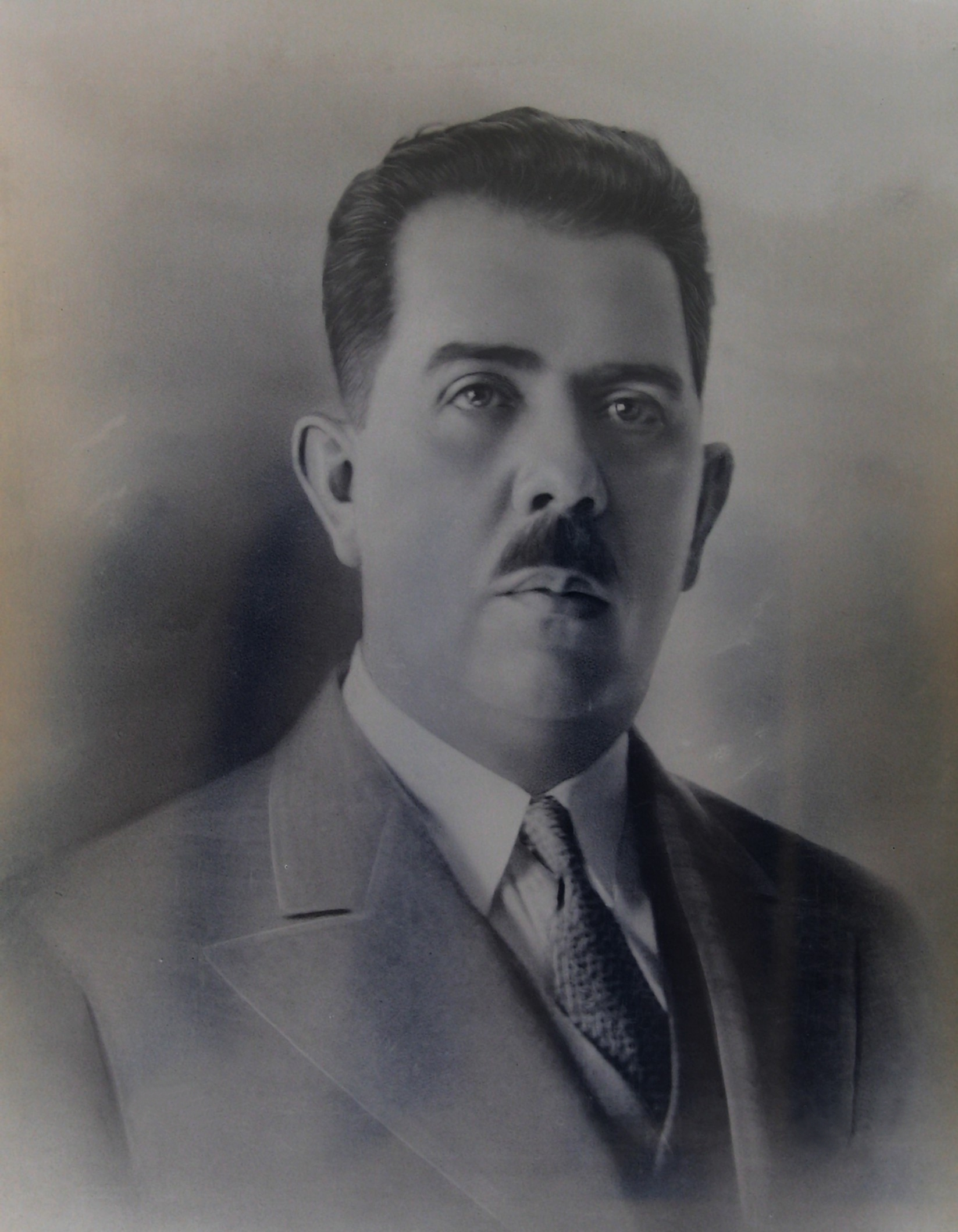
Emblem of the Party of the Mexican Revolution (1938–1946) which was founded by Lázaro Cárdenas, President of Mexico from 1934 to 1940, being chosen under the PNR since it was not until 1938 that he founded the PRM

Cárdenas became perhaps Mexico's most popular 20th-century president, most renowned for the 1938 expropriating the oil interests of the United States and European petroleum companies in the run-up to World War II. That same year Cárdenas put his own stamp on the party, reorganizing it in 1938 as the Party of the Mexican Revolution (Spanish: Partido de la Revolución Mexicana, PRM) whose aim was to establish a democracy of workers and socialism. However, this was never achieved.

Cárdenas's intention was to establish the broad-based political alliances necessary for the party's long-term survival, as a national party with territorial presence in state and municipal governments, and organization of mass interest groups, via corporatism. The structure he established has remained intact. He created sectors of the party and structured them into mass organizations to represent different interest groups within the party, to protect the interests of workers and peasants.

The PRM had four sectors: labor, peasant (campesino), "popular", mainly teachers and civil servants; and the military. The labor section was organized via the Confederation of Mexican Workers (CTM); the peasant sector by the National Confederation of Campesinos, (CNC); and the middle class sector by the Federation of Unions of Workers in Service to the State (FSTSE). The party incorporated the majority of Mexicans through their mass organizations, but absent from the structure for ideological reasons were two important groups, private business interests and adherents of the Catholic Church. Those two came together in 1939 to form the National Action Party, which grew to be the major opposition party, winning the presidency in 2000.

The most powerful labor union prior to the formation of the party was the Regional Confederation of Mexican Workers (CROM), headed by Luis N. Morones, an ally of Obregón and Calles. A dissident within the CROM, Marxist Vicente Lombardo Toledano, formed a rival labor confederation, the CTM, in 1936, which became the mass organization of labor within the PRM. Lombardo stepped down from the leadership of the CTM in 1941, after Cárdenas left the presidency. He was replaced by Fidel Velázquez, who remained head of the CTM until his death at age 97. Within the party structure and the government, labor has had a continuous, formalized, visual corporate role, but with Velázquez's death in 1997, organized labor has fractured.

Peasants were organized via the Confederación Nacional Campesina (CNC), or National Peasant Confederation, which Cárdenas saw as a force against landowners, but it became the vehicle for patron-client / state-campesino relationships. Whether the intention or not of Cárdenas, the CNC became a means to channel and control the peasantry.

The so-called "popular" sector of the party was organized via the Confederación Nacional de Organizaciones Populares (CNOP), which was formed in 1943 to integrate sectors of the urban middle class into the party. Unlike the peasantry or labor, the popular sector was a more ill-defined segment, but it did include the large Federation of Unions of Civil Servants (Federación de Sindicatos de Trabajadores al Servicio del Estado (FSTSE).

By incorporating the military into the PRM structure, Cárdenas's aim was to make it politically dependent on the party rather than allow it to be a separate group outside the party and potentially a politically interventionist force. Although some critics questioned the military's incorporation into the party, Cárdenas saw it as a way to assert civilian control. He is quoted as saying, "We did not put the Army in politics. It was already there. In fact it had been dominating the situation, and we did well to reduce its voice to one in four." In general, the corporatist model is most often associated with fascism, whose rise in Germany and Italy in the 1930s coincided with Cárdenas's presidency.

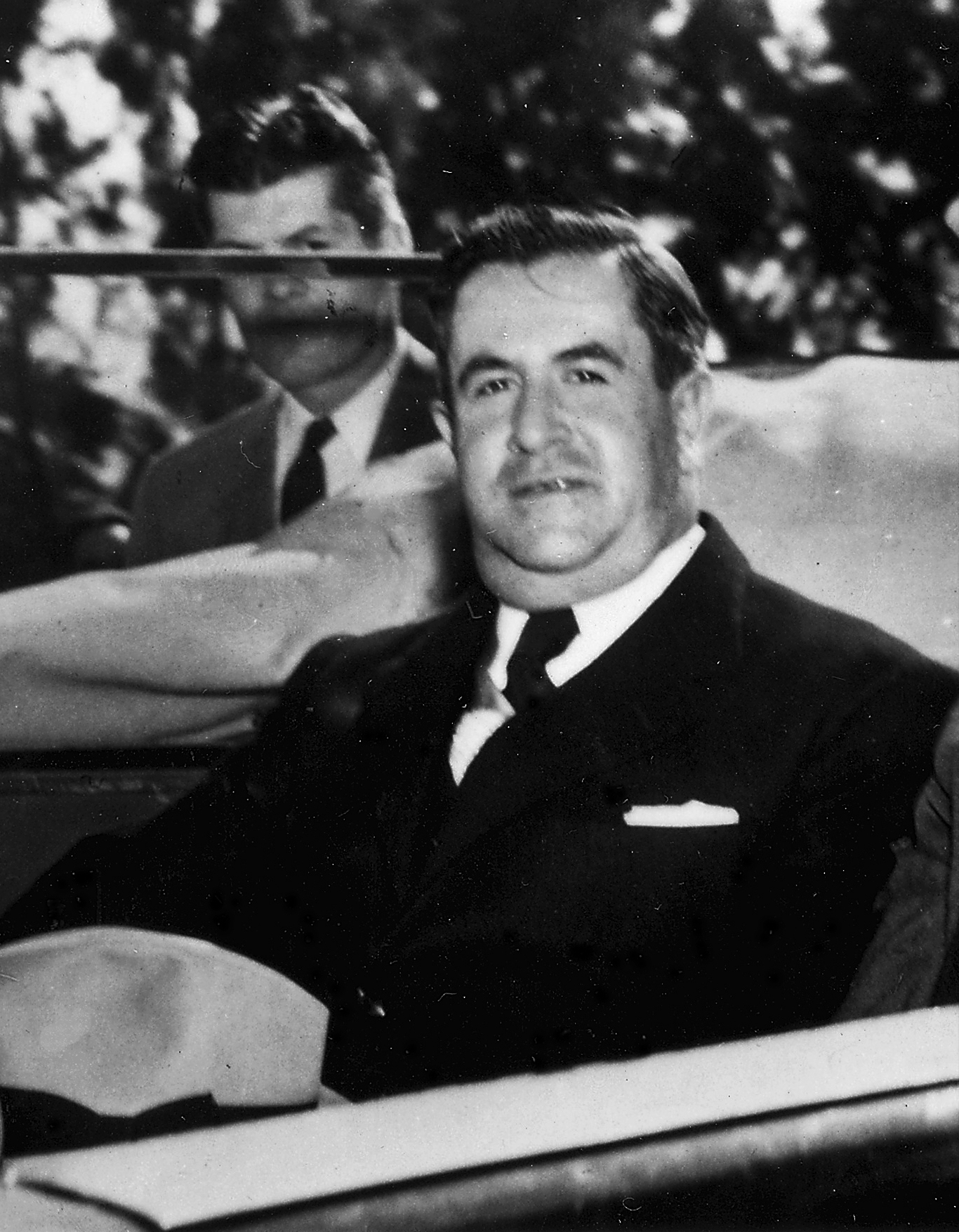
Manuel Ávila Camacho in 1943

But Cárdenas was emphatically opposed to fascism; however, he created the PRM and organized the Mexican state on authoritarian lines. That reorganization can be seen as the enduring legacy of the Cárdenas presidency. Although the PRM was reorganized into the Institutional Revolutionary Party in 1946, the basic structure was retained. Cárdenas's calculation that the military's incorporation into the PRM would undermine its power was essentially correct, since it disappeared as a separate sector of the party, but was absorbed into the "popular" sector. The organizational change in the PNR to the PRM, and later the PRM to the PRI, were "imposed by Mexican presidents without any discussion within the party."

Cárdenas followed the pattern of Calles and Obregón before him, designating his choice in the upcoming elections; for Cárdenas this was Manuel Ávila Camacho. In the 1940 election, Ávila Camacho's main rival was former revolutionary general Juan Andreu Almazán, with PRM victory coming via fraud after a violent campaign period. Cárdenas is said to have secured the support of the CTM and the CNC for Ávila Camacho by personally guaranteeing their interests would be respected.

In the final year of Ávila Camacho's term, the party assembly decided on a new name, pushed by the circle of Miguel Alemán, the Institutional Revolutionary Party, pairing seemingly contradictory terms of "institutional" and "revolutionary."

== PRI and Dominant-party state: 1946–1988 ==
=== Change in structure and ideology ===
The party's name was changed in 1946, the final year of Manuel Ávila Camacho's term of office. The sectoral representation in the party continued for the workers, peasants, and the popular sector, but the military was no longer represented by its own sector. The Mexican president was at the apex of the political system with the PRI. To reach the top of the government, as the candidate and then president of the republic, the path was only through membership and leadership in the party and government service. Within the party, there were factions, the técnicos, bureaucrats with specialized knowledge and training, especially with the economy, and políticos, the seasoned politicians, many of whom had regional roots in state politics.

Miguel Alemán was the PRI's candidate in the 1946 elections, but he did not run unopposed. Alemán and his circle had hoped to abandon sectoral representation in the party and separate the party as an organism of the state, but there was considerable pushback from the labor sector and the CTM, which would have lost influence, along with the other sectors. The structure of the party remained sectoral, but the Alemanistas abandoned the goal that had been "the preparation of the people for the implementation of a workers' democracy and for the arrival of a socialist regime." The party slogan was changed from the PRM's "[f]or a workers' democracy" (Por una democracia de trabajadores) to the PRI's "[d]emocracy and justice" (Democracia y justicia).

In practice after Cárdenas left office, the party became more centrist, and his more radical agrarian policies were abandoned. With Lombardo Toledano's replacement as leader of the CTM, labor under the CTM's Fidel Velázquez became even more closely identified with the party. The more radical left of the labor movement, under Vicente Lombardo Toledano, split from the PRI, the Partido Popular. Although the party gave voice to workers' demands, since it was outside the umbrella of the PRI and lost power and influence. The leadership of component unions became advocates of PRI policy at the expense of the rank and file in exchange for political backing from the party and financial benefits. These charro ("cowboy") unions turned out the labor vote at election time, a guaranteed base of support for the party. During prosperous years, CTM could argue for benefits of the rank-and-file, such as higher wages, networking to provide jobs for union loyalists, and job security. The principle of no-reelection did not apply to the CTM, so that the party loyalist Velázquez provided decades of continuity even as the presidency changed every six years.

The PRI won every presidential election from 1929 to 1982, by well over 70 percent of the vote – margins that were usually obtained by massive electoral frauds. Toward the end of his term, the incumbent president, in consultation with party leaders, selected the PRI's candidate in the next election in a procedure known as "the tap of the finger" (Spanish: el dedazo), which was integral in the continued success of the PRI towards the end of the 20th century. In essence, given the PRI's overwhelming dominance, and its control of the electoral apparatus, the president chose his successor. The PRI's dominance was near-absolute at all other levels as well. It held an overwhelming majority in the Chamber of Deputies, as well as every seat in the Senate and every state governorship.

The political stability and economic prosperity in the late 1940s and the 1950s benefited the party, so that in general Mexicans did not object to the lack of real democracy.

=== Mexican Miracle ===
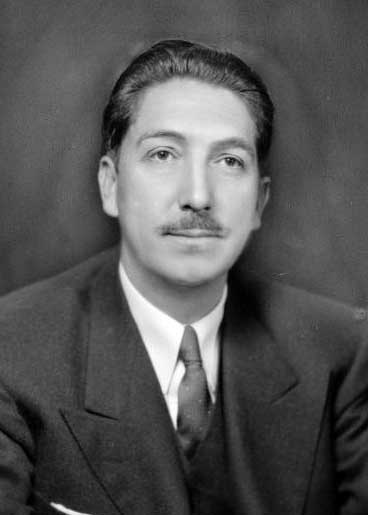
Miguel Alemán Valdés was the first civilian president following the Mexican Revolution and son of a revolutionary general.

Starting with the Alemán administration (1946–1952) until 1970, Mexico embarked on a sustained period of economic growth, dubbed the Mexican Miracle, fueled by import substitution and low inflation. From 1940 to 1970 GDP increased sixfold while the population only doubled, and peso-dollar parity was maintained at a stable exchange rate.

Economic nationalist and protectionist policies implemented in the 1930s effectively closed off Mexico to foreign trade and speculation, so that the economy was fueled primarily by state investment and businesses were heavily reliant on government contracts. As a result of these policies, Mexico's capitalist impulses were channeled into massive industrial development and social welfare programs, which helped to urbanize the mostly-agrarian country, funded generous welfare subsidies for the working class, and fueled considerable advances in communication and transportation infrastructure. This period of commercial growth created a significant urban middle class of white-collar bureaucrats and office workers, and allowed high-ranking PRI officials to steal (graft) large personal fortunes through their control over state-funded programs. State monopoly over key industries like electricity and telecommunication allowed a small clique of businessmen to dominate their sectors of the economy by supplying government-owned companies with goods and commodities.

A major impact of Mexico's economic growth was urban population growth, transforming the country from a largely rural one to urban. The middle class grew substantially. The overall population of Mexico grew substantially with a greater proportion being under the age of 16. These factors combined to decrease the pull of the past. The policies promoting industrial growth helped fuel the growth of Mexico's north as a center of economic dynamism, with the city of Monterrey becoming Mexico's second-largest.

The general economic prosperity served to legitimize PRI hegemony in the eyes of most Mexicans, and for decades the party faced no real opposition on any level of government. On the rare occasions when an opposition candidate, usually from the conservative National Action Party, whose strength was in Mexico's north, garnered a majority of votes in an election, the PRI often used its control of local government to rig election results in its favor. Voter apathy was characteristic in this period, with low turnout in elections. The PRI co-opted criticism by incorporating sectors of society into its hierarchy. PRI-controlled labor unions ("charro unions") maintained a tight grip over the working classes; the PRI held rural farmers in check through its control of the ejidos (state-owned plots of land that peasants could farm but not own), and generous financial support of universities and the arts ensured that most intellectuals rarely challenged the ideals of the Mexican Revolution. In this way, PRI rule was supported by a broad national consensus that held firm for decades, even as polarizing forces gradually worked to divide the nation in preparation for the crises of the 1970s and 1980s. The consensus specifically held that Mexico would be capitalist in its economic model; that the masses of workers and peasants would be kept in check – as separate units and not allowed to merge into a single sector that would have too much strength; that the state and the party would be the agent for this control; and that the state and private entrepreneurs would compete in the mixed economy. So long as there was general prosperity, the system was stable economically and politically. Political balance meant that sectors had a voice within the party, but the party and the state were the arbiters of the system. Those supporting the system received material rewards that the state distributed. In this period, there was a continuing rapprochement with the United States, which built on their alliance in World War II. Although there was rhetoric about economic nationalism and defense of Mexican sovereignty, there was broad-based cooperation between the two countries.

Cracks appeared in the system. There was significant labor unrest with strikes by railway workers, electricians, and even medical doctors that were brutally suppressed. Culturally the mood was changing as well, with Carlos Fuentes publishing The Death of Artemio Cruz (La Muerte de Artemio Cruz) in 1962, metaphorically the death of the ideals of the Mexican Revolution. The fictional Cruz had been a revolutionary soldier, corrupt politician, and businessman, now on his deathbed. Considered a landmark in Latin American literature, it highlighted aspects of Mexican history and its political system.

=== Attempts at party reform ===
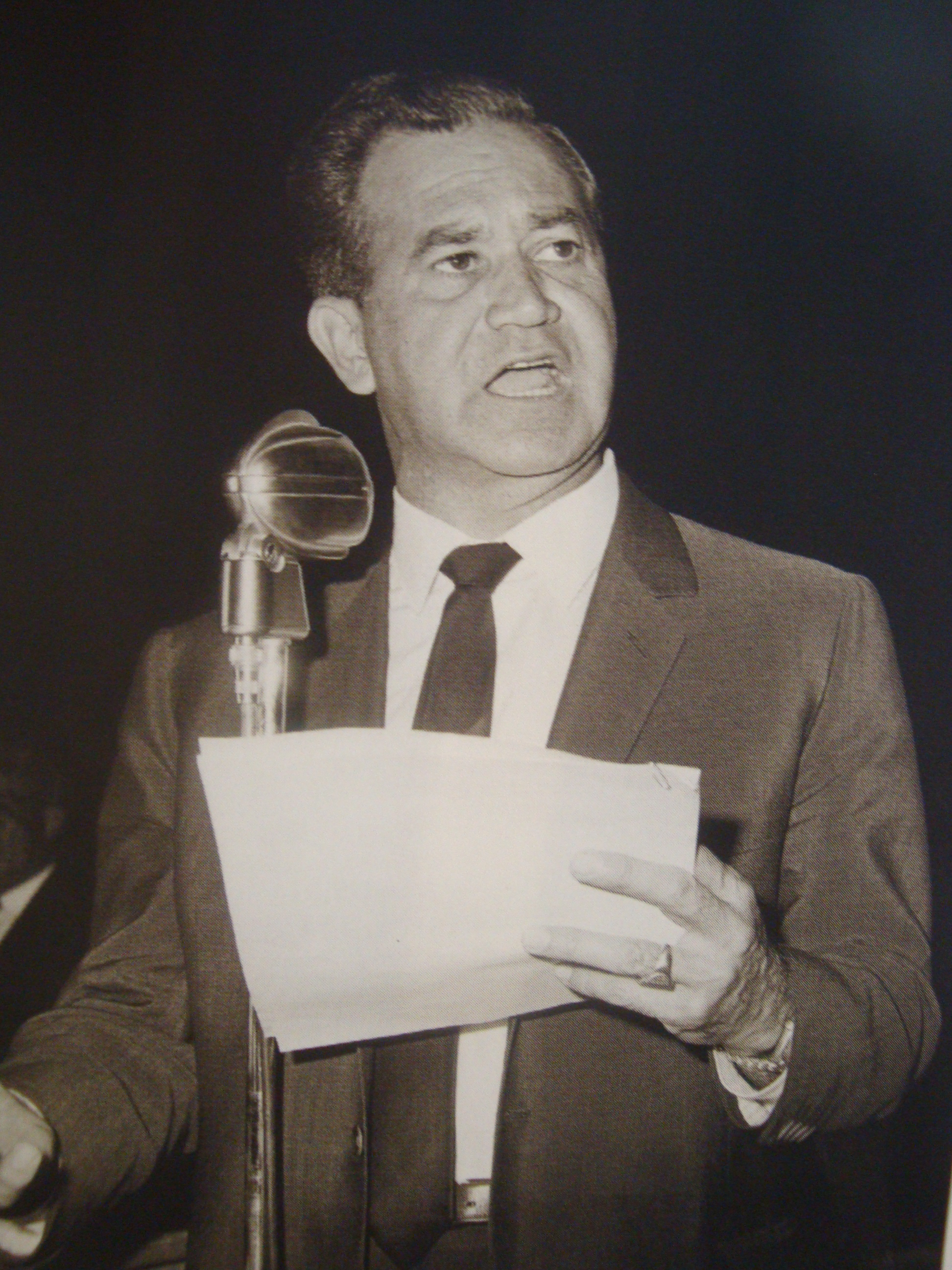
Carlos A. Madrazo, a reformist PRI politician

When Alemán became president in 1946, the PRI had begun experiments in internal primaries, but Alemán cracked down on this democratic opening and had congress pass a law against parties holding primaries. Revolutionary general Rodolfo Sánchez Taboada, president of the party, had been in favor of primaries, but Alemán's viewpoint prevailed and PRI candidates were chosen in closed party assemblies. Sánchez was replaced as titular head of the party, and the president of the republic remained firmly in control.

During the early presidency of Gustavo Díaz Ordaz, Carlos A. Madrazo was appointed president of the party and undertook serious reforms in 1964–65. PRI legislators were attempting to negate the principle of no-reelection for members of congress, which many of supported. Madrazo went further in reform attempts, seeking to democratize the electoral process for municipal candidates, which sectoral leaders and local PRI bossed opposed because it would undermine their hold on local elections. It was implemented in just seven states. Madrazo was forced to resign. Madrazo died in an airplane crash in 1969, which at the time was considered suspicious.

Only in 2000 did the PRI choose its presidential candidate through a primary, but its candidate Francisco Labastida lost that election.

=== Political impact of the 1968 Tlatelolco massacre ===
The improvement of the economy had a disparate impact in different social sectors and discontent started growing within the middle class as well as the popular classes. The doctors' strike in 1965 was a manifestation of middle-class discontent. Seeking better wages and workplace conditions, doctors demanded redress from the government. Rather than give into such demands, President Díaz Ordaz sent in riot troops to suppress the strike with brute force and arrest leaders. Two hundred doctors were fired. Díaz Ordaz's hard line on this strike by a sector of the middle class presaged even harsher suppression during the summer of 1968.

With the choice of capital for the venue for the 1968 Mexico City Olympic Games slated for October, the government poured huge resources into preparing facilities. Mexico wanted to showcase its economic achievements and sought the international focus on the country. Maintaining an image of a prosperous and well-ordered Mexico was important for the Mexican government. In a relatively low-level conflict in late July 1968 between young people in Mexico City, the Granadero riot police used violence to tamp down the incident. However, the crackdown had the opposite effect, with students at the National University (UNAM) and the National Polytechnic Institute (IPN) putting aside their traditional rivalries and joining together in protest in the Mexican Student Movement.

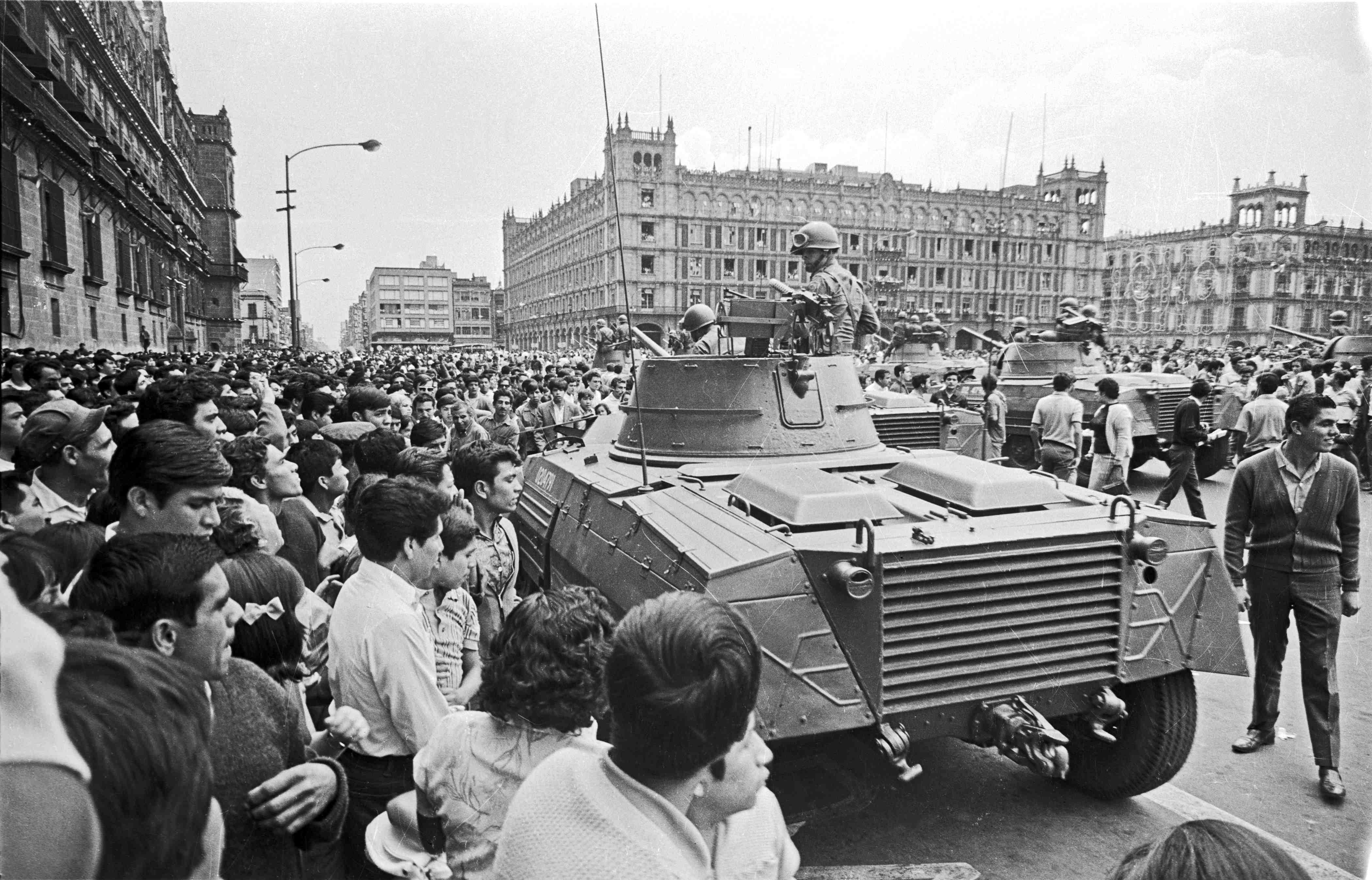
Armored cars in the Zócalo, summer 1968

They protested lack of democracy and social justice in Mexico. Middle-class university students had largely been apolitical up until this point. President Gustavo Díaz Ordaz (1964–1970) ordered the army to occupy the university to suppress the mobilization and minimize the disruption of the Olympic Games. Orderly large-scale protests in downtown Mexico City showed the discontent of students and their largely middle-class supporters. As the opening ceremonies of the Olympics approached, the government sought help from the United States in dealing with the protests. Unaccustomed to this type of protest, the Mexican government made an unusual move by asking the United States for assistance, through LITEMPO, a spy-program to inform the Central Intelligence Agency (CIA) of the US to obtain information from Mexico. The CIA responded by sending military radios, weapons and ammunition. The LITEMPO had previously provided the Díaz Ordaz government with 1,000 rounds of .223 Remington ammunition in 1963.

After weeks of huge and largely peaceful demonstrations in Mexico City in August and September by students and middle-class Mexicans, the government cracked down on 2 October, with army and special tactical units opening fire on a relatively small demonstration in Tlatelolco, a section of the metropolis. The aggressive military response led to 300-400 dead, over 1,000 wounded, and more than 1,000 arrested protestors, although precise numbers are in dispute. Despite that the Olympics went forward on schedule, with the president of the Olympic Committee declaring that the protests were against the Mexican government and not the Olympics themselves, so the games proceeded.

Political life in Mexico was changed that day. 2 October 1968, the date of what is known as the Tlatelolco massacre, is a turning point in Mexican history. That date "marks a psychological departure in which Mexicans – particularly urban, well-educated citizens, intellectuals, and even government officials themselves – began to question the efficiency and morality of an authoritarian state that required violence against middle-class students to maintain its position of authority and legitimacy to govern." Intellectuals were alienated from the regime, after decades of cooperation with the government and receiving benefits for that service. The poet and essayist Octavio Paz, who would later win the Nobel Prize in Literature, resigned as Mexican Ambassador to India. Novelist Carlos Fuentes denounced the repression.

Díaz Ordaz chose Luis Echeverría as the PRI candidate in the 1970 election. As the Minister of the Interior, Echeverría was operationally responsible for the Tlatelolco massacre.

=== Economic crisis of the 1970s ===
By the early 1970s, fundamental issues were emerging in the industrial and agricultural sectors of Mexico's economy. Regional underdevelopment, technological shortages, lack of foreign competition, and uneven distribution of wealth led to chronic underproduction of investment and capital goods, putting the long-term future of Mexican industry in doubt. Meanwhile, ubiquitous poverty combined with a dearth of agricultural investment and infrastructure caused continuous migration from rural to urban areas; in 1971, Mexican agriculture was in such a state that the country had become a net importer of food. Overvaluation of the peso led to a decline in the tourism industry (which had previously compensated for failures in industry and agriculture) meant that by the early 1970s, the economy had begun to falter, and they believed the only sure source of capital was external borrowing.

Díaz Ordaz chose his government secretary, Luis Echeverría, to succeed him as president. Echeverría's administration (1970–76) increased social spending, through external debt, at a time when oil production and prices were surging. However, the growth of the economy came accompanied by inflation and then by a plummeting of oil prices and increases in interest rates. Investment started fleeing the country and the peso became overvalued, to prevent a devaluation and further fleeing of investments, the Bank of Mexico borrowed 360 million dollars from the Federal Reserve with the promise of stabilizing the economy. External debt reached the level of $25 billion. Unable to contain the fleeing of dollars, Echeverría allowed the peso to float for the first time on 31 August 1976, then again later and the peso lost half of its value. Echeverría designated José López Portillo, his Secretary of Finance, as his successor for the term 1976–82, hoping that the new administration would have a tighter control on inflation and to preserve political unity.

=== Election of 1976, PRI runs unopposed ===
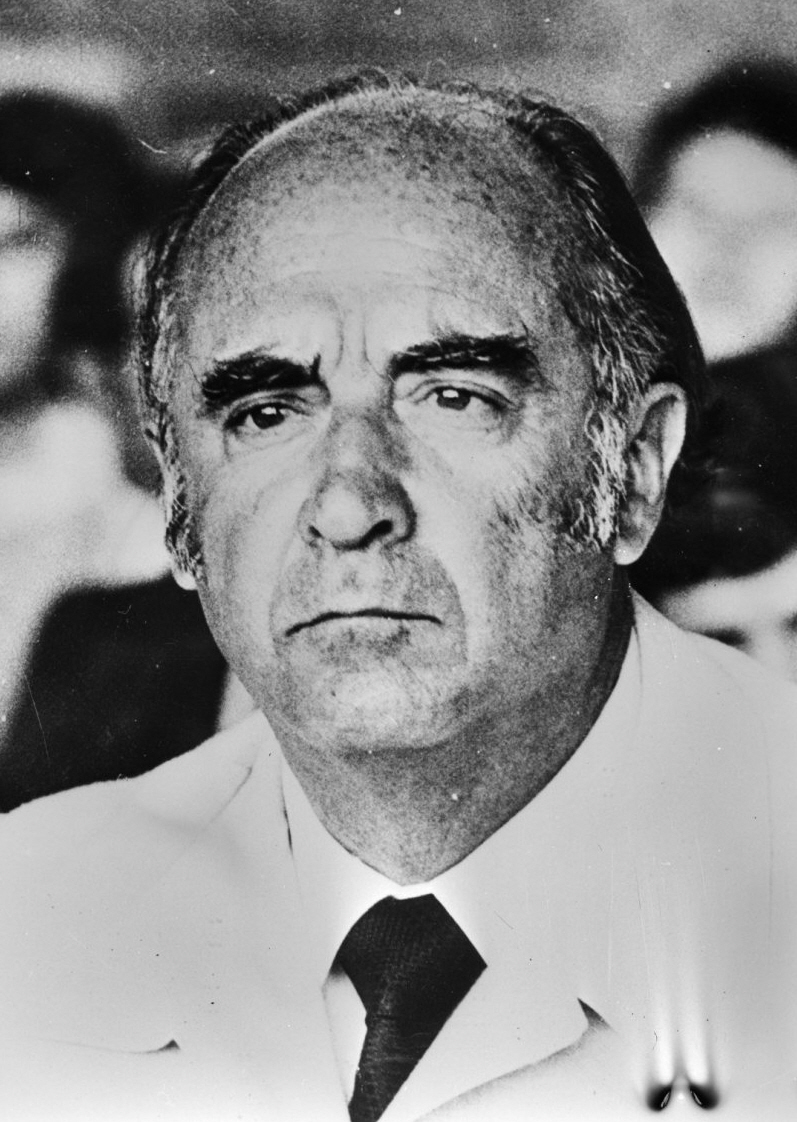
José López Portillo in 1976

In the 1976 election, the PRI presidential candidate José López Portillo faced no real opposition, not even the National Action Party, which did not field a candidate in this election due to an ideological split. The lack of the appearance of democracy in the national elections undermined the legitimacy of the system. He proposed a reform called Ley Federal de Organizaciones Políticas y Procesos Electorales which gave official registry to opposition groups such as the Mexican Democratic Party and the Mexican Communist Party. This law also created positions in the lower chamber of congress for opposition parties through proportionality of votes, relative majority, uninominal and plurinominal. As a result, in 1979, the first independent (non-PRI) communist deputies were elected to the Congress of Mexico. Within the PRI, party president Carlos Sansores pushed for what he called "transparent democracy", but the effort went nowhere.

Although López Portillo's term started with economic difficulties, the discovery of significant oil reserves in Mexico allowed him to borrow funds from foreign banks to be repaid in dollars against future revenues to allocate funds for social spending immediately. The discovery of significant oil sites in Tabasco and Campeche helped the economy to recover and López Portillo promised to "administer the abundance." The development of the promising oil industry was financed through external debt which reached 59 billion dollars (compared to 25 billion during Echeverría). Oil production increased from 94,000 barrels per day (14,900 m^{3}/d) at the beginning of his administration to 1,500,000 barrels per day (240,000 m^{3}/d) at the end of his administration and Mexico became the fourth largest oil producer in the world. The price for a barrel of oil also increased from three dollars in 1970 to 35 dollars in 1981. The government attempted to develop heavy industry. However, waste became the rule as centralized resource allocation and distribution systems were accompanied by inefficiently located factories incurring high transport costs.

Mexico increased its international presence during López Portillo's term: in addition to becoming the world's fourth oil exporter, Mexico restarted relations with the post-Franco Spain in 1977, allowed Pope John Paul II to visit, welcomed U.S. president Jimmy Carter, broke relations with Somoza and supported the Sandinista National Liberation Front in its rebellion against the U.S.-supported government. López Portillo also proposed the Plan Mundial de Energéticos in 1979 and summoned a North-South World Summit in Cancún in 1981 to seek solutions to social problems. In 1979, the PRI founded the COPPPAL, the Permanent Conference of Political Parties of Latin America and the Caribbean, an organization created "to defend democracy and all lawful political institutions and to support their development and improvement to strengthen the principle of self determination of the peoples of Latin America and the Caribbean".

Social programs were also created through the Alliance for Production, Global Development Plan, el COPLAMAR, Mexican Nourishing System, to attain independence on food, to reform public administration. López Portillo also created the secretaries of Programming and Budgeting, Agriculture and Water Resources, Industrial Support, Fisheries and Human Settlements and Public Works. Mexico then obtained high economic growth, a recuperation of salaries and an increase in spending on education and infrastructure. This way, social and regional inequalities started to diminish. The attempted industrialization had not been responsive to consumer needs. Therefore, unprecedented urbanization and overcrowding followed and so, substandard pre-fabricated apartment blocs had to be built in large cities.

All this prosperity ended when the over-supply of oil in early 1982 caused oil prices to plummet and severely damaged the national economy. Interest rates skyrocketed in 1981 and external debt reached 86 billion dollars and exchange rates went from 26 to 70 pesos per dollar and inflation of 100%. This situation became so desperate that Lopez Portillo ordered the suspension on payments of external debt and the nationalization of the banking industry in 1982 consistent with the Socialist goals of the PRI. Capital fled Mexico at a rate never seen before in history. The Mexican government provided subsidies to staple food products and rail travel; this diminished the consequences of the crises on the populace. Job growth stagnated and millions of people migrated North to escape the economic stagnation. López Portillo's reputation plummeted and his character became the butt of jokes from the press. In his last presidential address on 1 September 1982, he nationalized foreign banks. During his campaign, López Portillo promised to defend the peso "como un perro" ("like a dog"), López Portillo refused to devalue the currency saying "The president who devalues, devalues himself."

=== First of the technocratic presidents, 1982 ===
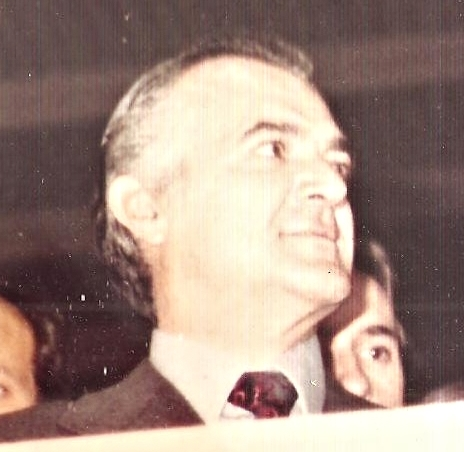
Miguel de la Madrid in 1982

When López Portillo left office in December 1982, the economy was in shambles. He designated Miguel de la Madrid as the PRI candidate, the first of a series of economists to rule the country, a technocrat who turned his back on populist policies to implement neoliberal reforms, causing the number of state-owned industries to decline from 1155 to a mere 412. After the 1982 default, crisis lenders were unwilling to loan Mexico and this resulted in currency devaluations to finance spending. An earthquake in September 1985, in which his administration was criticised for its slow and clumsy reaction, added more woe to the problems. As a result of the crisis, black markets supplied by goods stolen from the public sector appeared. Galloping inflation continued to plague the country, hitting a record high in 1987 at 159%.

== Transition to multi-party system: 1988–2000 ==
=== Left-wing splits from the PRI ===
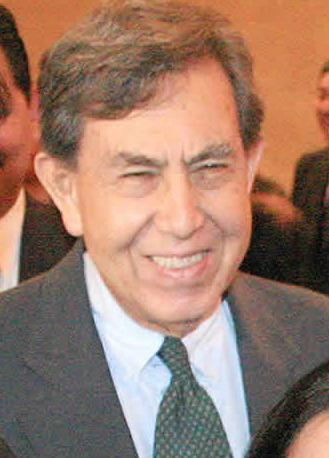
Cuauhtémoc Cárdenas, seen here in 2002, split from the PRI, running unsuccessfully for president in 1988, 1994 and 2000

In 1986, Cuauhtémoc Cárdenas (former Governor of Michoacán and son of the former president of Mexico Lázaro Cárdenas) formed the "Democratic Current" (Spanish: Corriente Democrática) of the PRI, which criticized the federal government for reducing spending on social programs to increase payments on foreign debt. The members of the Democratic Current were expelled from the party and formed the National Democratic Front (FDN, Spanish: Frente Democrático Nacional) in 1987. The following year, the FDN elected Cárdenas as presidential candidate for the 1988 presidential election which was won by Carlos Salinas de Gortari, obtaining 50.89% of the votes (according to official figures) versus 32% of Cárdenas. The official results were delayed, with the Secretary of the Interior (until then, the organizer of elections) blaming it on a computer system failure. Cárdenas claimed to have won and claimed such computer failure was caused by a manipulation of the system to count votes. Manuel Clouthier of the National Action Party (PAN, Spanish: Partido Acción Nacional) also claimed to have won, although not as vocally.

Miguel de la Madrid, Mexico's president at the time of the 1988 election, admitted in 2004 that, on the evening of the election, he received news that Cárdenas was going to win by a majority, and that he and others rigged the election as a result.

Clouthier, Cárdenas and Rosario Ibarra de Piedra then complained before the building of the Secretary of the Interior. Clouthier and his followers then set up other protests, among them one at the Chamber of Deputies, demanding that the electoral packages be opened. In 1989, Clouthier presented an alternative cabinet (a British style Shadow Cabinet) with Diego Fernández de Cevallos, Jesús González Schmal, Fernando Canales Clariond, Francisco Villarreal Torres, Rogelio Sada Zambrano, María Elena Álvarez Bernal, Moisés Canales, Vicente Fox, Carlos Castillo Peraza and Luis Felipe Bravo Mena as cabinet members and Clouthier as cabinet coordinator. The purpose of this cabinet was to vigilate the actions of the government. Clouthier died next October in an accident with Javier Calvo, a federal deputy. The accident has been claimed by the PAN as a state assassination since then. That same year, the PRI lost its first state government with the election of Ernesto Ruffo Appel as governor of Baja California.

=== Attempt at internal reform, 1990s ===
Luis Donaldo Colosio, at the time party president, attempted a "democratic experiment" to open up the party at the level of candidates for gubernatorial and municipal elections, which would bar precandidates from campaigning for the nomination, but without a democratic tradition within the party and as basic a fact as the lack of lists of party membership meant the experiment failed. Carlos Salinas de Gortari resisted any attempts to reform the party. At the end of 1994, after the assassination of Colosio who had been designated the PRI presidential candidate, the party did move toward greater internal democracy.

=== Political turmoil and decline of power ===
In 1990, Peruvian writer Mario Vargas Llosa called the government under the PRI la dictadura perfecta ("the perfect dictatorship"). Despite that perception, a major blow came with the assassination of the 1994 PRI candidate Luis Donaldo Colosio, the first high-level assassination since that of president-elect Alvaro Obregón in 1928, which led to Calles forming the PRN to deal with the political vacuum. President Carlos Salinas de Gortari designated Colosio's campaign director, Ernesto Zedillo Ponce de León, as the new PRI candidate, who was subsequently elected. The 1994 elections were the first Mexican presidential election monitored by international observers.

A number of factors, including the 1994 economic crisis in Mexico, caused the PRI to lose its absolute majority in both chambers of the federal congress for the first time in 1997.

After several decades in power the PRI had become a symbol of corruption and electoral fraud. The conservative National Action Party (PAN) became a stronger party after 1976 when it obtained the support from businessmen after recurring economic crises. Consequently, the PRI's left wing separated and formed its own party, the Party of the Democratic Revolution (PRD) in 1989.

Critics claim electoral fraud, with voter suppression and violence, was used when the political machine did not work and elections were just a ritual to simulate the appearance of a democracy. However, the three major parties now make the same claim against each other (PRD against Vicente Fox's PAN and PAN vs. López Obrador's PRD, and the PRI against the PAN at the local level and local elections such as the 2007 Yucatán state election). Two other PRI presidents Miguel de la Madrid and Carlos Salinas de Gortari privatized many outmoded industries, including banks and businesses, entered the General Agreement on Tariffs and Trade and also negotiated the North American Free Trade Agreement.

In the final decades of the PRI regime, the connections between the party and drug cartels became more evident, as the drug trade saw a massive increase, which worsened corruption in the party and at all spheres of Government. In 1984, journalist Manuel Buendía was murdered by agents of the Federal Security Directorate (Buendía had been investigating possible ties between Drug cartels, the CIA and the FSD itself). In 1997, general Jesús Gutiérrez Rebollo, who had been appointed by president Ernesto Zedillo as head of the Instituto Nacional de Combate a las Drogas, was arrested after it was discovered that he had been collaborating with the Juárez Cartel. In another infamous incident, Mario Villanueva, a member of the PRI and outgoing governor of Quintana Roo, was accused in 1999 of drug trafficking. When the evidence against him became strong enough to warrant an arrest, he disappeared from the public eye two days before the end of his term, being absent at the ceremony at which he was to hand the office over to his elected successor, Joaquín Hendricks Díaz. Villanueva remained a fugitive from justice for many months, until being captured and arrested in 2001.

== First time in opposition: 2000–2012 ==
=== Loss of the presidency of Mexico ===
Prior to the 2000 general elections, the PRI held its first primaries to elect the party's presidential candidate. The primary candidates, nicknamed "los cuatro fantásticos" (Spanish for The Fantastic Four), were:

- Francisco Labastida Ochoa (former governor of Sinaloa and Secretary of the Interior)
- Roberto Madrazo Pintado (former governor of Tabasco)
- Manuel Bartlett (former governor of Puebla and Secretary of the Interior)
- Humberto Roque Villanueva

The favorites in the primaries were Labastida and Madrazo, and the latter initiated a campaign against the first, perceived as Zedillo's candidate since many former secretaries of the interior were chosen as candidates by the president. His campaign, produced by prominent publicist Carlos Alazraki, had the motto "Dale un Madrazo al dedazo" or "Give a Madrazo to the dedazo" with "madrazo" being an offensive slang term for a "strike" and "dedazo" a slang used to describe the unilaterally choosing of candidates by the president (literally "finger-strike").

The growth of the PAN and PRD parties culminated in 2000, when the PAN won the presidency, and again in 2006 (won this time by the PAN with a small margin over the PRD.) Many prominent members of the PAN (Manuel Clouthier, Addy Joaquín Coldwell and Demetrio Sodi), most of the PRD (most notably all three Mexico City mayors Andrés Manuel López Obrador, Cuauhtémoc Cárdenas and Marcelo Ebrard), the PVEM (Jorge González Torres) and New Alliance (Roberto Campa) were once members of the PRI, including many presidential candidates from the opposition (Clouthier, López Obrador, Cárdenas, González Torres, Campa and Porfirio Muñoz Ledo, among many others).

In the presidential elections of 2 July 2000, its candidate Francisco Labastida Ochoa was defeated by Vicente Fox, after getting only 36.1% of the popular vote. It was to be the first Presidential electoral defeat of the PRI. In the senatorial elections of the same date, the party won with 38.1%, or 33 out of 128 seats in the Senate of Mexico.

=== As an opposition party ===
After much restructuring, the party was able to make a recovery, winning the greatest number of seats (5% short of a true majority) in Congress in 2003: at these elections, the party won 224 out of 500 seats in the Chamber of Deputies, remaining as the largest single party in both the Chamber of Deputies and Senate. In the Federal District the PRI obtained only one borough mayorship (jefe delegacional) out of 16, and no first-past-the-post members of the city assembly. The PRI recouped some significant losses on the state level (most notably, the governorship of former PAN stronghold Nuevo León). On 6 August 2004, in two closely contested elections in Oaxaca and Tijuana, PRI candidates Ulises Ruiz Ortiz and Jorge Hank Rhon won the races for the governorship and municipal presidency respectively. The PAN had held control of the president's office of the municipality of Tijuana for 15 years. Six out of eight gubernatorial elections held during 2005 were won by the PRI: Quintana Roo, Hidalgo, Colima, Estado de México, Nayarit, and Coahuila. The PRI then controlled the states on the country's northern border with the US except for Baja California.

Later that year Roberto Madrazo, president of the PRI, left his post to seek a nomination as the party's candidate in the 2006 presidential election. According to the statutes, the presidency of the party would then go to Elba Esther Gordillo as party secretary. The rivalry between Madrazo and Gordillo caused Mariano Palacios Alcocer instead to become president of the party. After what was perceived an imposition of Madrazo as candidate a group was formed called Unidad Democrática (Spanish: "Democratic Unity"), although nicknamed Todos Unidos Contra Madrazo (Spanish: "Everybody United Against Madrazo" or "TUCOM") which was formed by governors and former state governors:

- Arturo Montiel (former governor of the State of Mexico)
- Enrique Jackson (federal senator)
- Tomás Yarrington (governor of Tamaulipas)
- Enrique Martínez (former governor of Coahuila)
- Manuel Núñez (governor of Hidalgo)

Montiel won the right to run against Madrazo for the candidacy but withdrew when it was made public that he and his French wife owned large properties in Europe. Madrazo and Everardo Moreno contended in the primaries which was won by the first. Madrazo then represented the PRI and the Ecologist Green Party of Mexico (PVEM) in the Alliance for Mexico coalition.

During his campaign Madrazo declared that the PRI and PRD were "first cousins"; to this Emilio Chuayffet Chemor responded that if that were the case then Andrés Manuel López Obrador (AMLO), candidate of the PRD, would also be a first cousin and he might win the election.

AMLO was by then the favorite in the polls, with many followers within the PRI. Madrazo, second at the polls, then released TV spots against AMLO with little success; his campaign was managed again by Alazraki. Felipe Calderón of the ruling PAN ran a more successful campaign, later surpassing Madrazo as the second favorite. Gordillo, also the teachers' union leader, resentful against Madrazo, helped a group of teachers constitute the New Alliance Party. Divisions within the party and a successful campaign of the PAN candidate caused Madrazo to fall to third place. The winner, as announced by the Federal Electoral Institute and evaluated by the Mexican Election Tribunal amidst a controversy, was Calderón. On 20 November that year, a group of young PRI politicians launched a movement that was set to reform and revolutionize the party. The PRI candidate failed to win a single state in the 2006 presidential election.

In the 2006 legislative elections the party won 106 out of 500 seats in the Chamber of Deputies and 35 out of 128 Senators.

The PRI regained the governorship of Yucatán in 2007, and was the party with the most mayorships and state congresspeople in the elections in Yucatán (tying with the PAN in the number of deputies), Chihuahua, Durango, Aguascalientes, Veracruz, Chiapas and Oaxaca. The PRI obtained the most mayorships in Zacatecas and the second-most deputies in the congressional elections of Zacatecas and Baja California.

In 2009, the PRI regained plurality control of the Mexican congress; this was the first time the congress had fallen to PRI control since PAN's victory in 2000.

The PRI benefited from both the growing unpopularity of Felipe Calderón's administration as president due to the notorious increase in the homicide rate as a result of his war on drugs, as well as internal conflicts in the left-wing Partido de la Revolucion Democratica (PRD) that deteriorated its image.

== Return to power: 2012–2018 ==
=== Return of the PRI ===
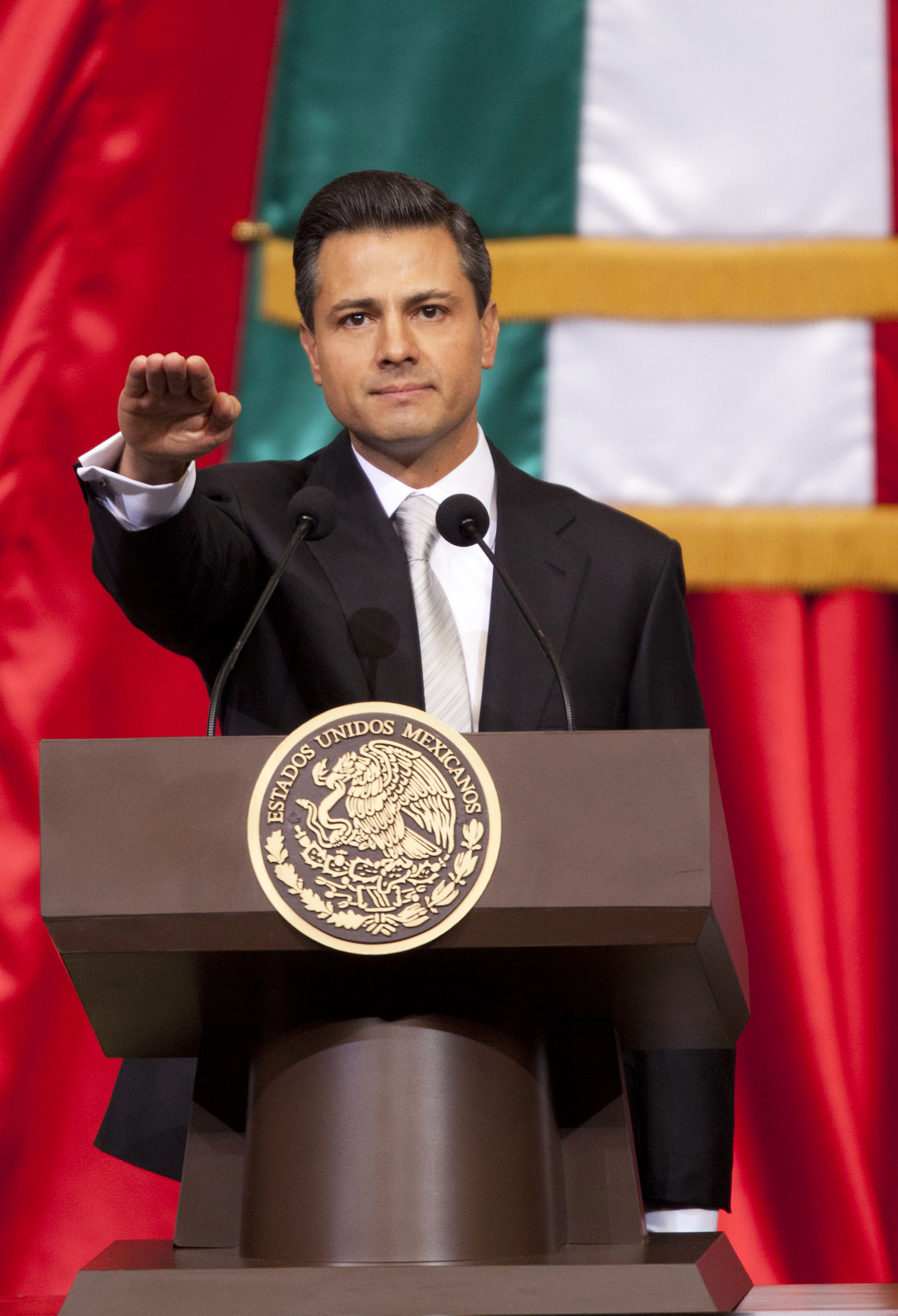
Enrique Peña Nieto's investiture as president of Mexico

Under Enrique Peña Nieto and after ruling for most of the past century in Mexico, the PRI returned to the presidency as it had brought hopes to those who gave the PRI another chance and fear to those who worried about the old PRI tactics of making deals with the cartels in exchange for relative peace. According to an article published by The Economist on 23 June 2012, part of the reason why Peña Nieto and the PRI were voted back to the presidency after a 12-year struggle lay in the disappointment of PAN rule. Buffeted by China's economic growth and the economic recession in the United States, the annual growth of Mexico's economy between 2000 and 2012 was 1.8%. Poverty grew worse, and without a ruling majority in Congress, the PAN presidents were unable to pass structural reforms, leaving monopolies and Mexico's educational system unchanged. In 2006, Felipe Calderón chose to make the battle against organized crime the centerpiece of his presidency. Nonetheless, with over 60,000 dead and a lack of any real progress, Mexican citizens became tired of a fight they had first supported, and not by majority. The Economist alleged that these signs were "not as bad as they look", since Mexico was more democratic, it contained a competitive export market, had a well-run economy despite the crisis, and there were tentative signs that the violence in the country may be plummeting. But if voters wanted the PRI back, The Economist claimed, it was because "the alternatives [were] weak". The magazine also alleged that Mexico's preferences should have gone left-wing, but the candidate that represented that movement – Andrés Manuel López Obrador – engaged in "disgraceful behaviour". The conservative candidate, Josefina Vázquez Mota, was deemed worthy but was considered by The Economist to have carried out a "shambolic campaign". Thus, Peña Nieto won by default, having been perceived (per the magazine) as the "least bad choice" for reform in Mexico.

==== Aftermath of the return of the PRI ====
When the PRI lost the presidency in 2000, few expected that the "perfect dictatorship", a description coined by Mario Vargas Llosa, would return again in only 12 years. The Associated Press published an article in July 2012 noting that many immigrants living in the United States were worried about the PRI's return to power and that it could dissuade many from returning to their homeland. The vast majority of the 400,000 voters outside of Mexico voted against Peña Nieto, and said they were "shocked" that the PRI – which largely convinced them to leave Mexico – had returned. Voters who favored Peña Nieto, however, believed that the PRI "had changed" and that more jobs would be created under the new regime. Moreover, some U.S. officials were concerned that Peña Nieto's security strategy meant the return to the old and corrupt practices of the PRI regime, where the government made deals with and overlooked the cartels in exchange for peace. They worried that Mexico's drug war, which had already cost over 50,000 lives, would make Mexicans question on why they should "pay the price for a US drug habit". Peña Nieto denied, however, that his party would tolerate corruption, and stated he would not make deals with the cartels. In spite of Peña's words, a poll from 20 September 2016, revealed that 83% of Mexican citizens perceived the PRI as the most corrupt political party in Mexico.

The return of the PRI brought some perceived negative consequences, among them:

- Low levels of presidential approval and allegations of presidential corruption: The government of President Enrique Peña Nieto faced multiple scandals and allegations of corruption. Reforma, which has conducted polls of presidential approval since 1995, revealed that Peña Nieto had received the lowest presidential approval in modern history since it had begun polling on the subject in 1995; he had received a mere 12% approval rating. The second-lowest approval was for Ernesto Zedillo (1994-2000), also from the PRI. It also revealed that both presidents elected from the National Action Party (PAN), Vicente Fox (2000–2006) and Felipe Calderón (2006–2012), had higher presidential approvals than the PRI presidents.
- PRI corrupt ex-governors declared criminals by the Mexican government: During Peña Nieto's government multiple members of the PRI political party were declared criminals by the Mexican government, which surprised the public given they were elected as PRI members and state governors within the Mexican government, among them Tomas Yarrington from Tamaulipas (along his predecessor Eugenio Hernández Flores), Javier Duarte from Veracruz, César Duarte Jáquez from Chihuahua (no family relation between both Duarte), and Roberto Borge from Quintana Roo, along their unknown multiple allies who enabled their corruption. All of them supported Peña Nieto during his presidential campaign.
- State of Mexico allegations of electoral fraud (2017): The 2017 elections within the state of Mexico were highly controversial, with multiple media outlets feeling there was electoral fraud committed by the PRI. In November 2017, magazine Proceso published an article accusing the PRI of breaking at least 16 state laws during the elections, which were denounced 619 times. They said that all of them were broken in order to favor PRI candidate for governor Alfredo del Mazo Maza (who is the cousin of Enrique Peña Nieto and whom several of his relatives have also been governors of said entity). The article claims it has been the most corrupt election in modern Mexican history, and directly blames the PRI. Despite all the evidence, Alfredo del Mazo was declared winner of the election by the electoral tribunals, and served a term as governor.

The Chamber of Deputies also suffered from controversies from members of the PRI:

- Law 3 of 3 Anticorruption controversy: In early 2016, a controversy arose when all the Senate disputes from the PRI, voted against the "Ley 3 de 3 (Law 3 of 3)", a law that would have obligated every politician to announce three items: a public patrimonial declaration, an interests declaration, and a fiscal declaration. A revised, less comprehensive version of the law was accepted but it does not oblige politicians to make the three items. While it was completely legal for the deputies from the PRI to vote against such a law, some news media outlets interpreted the votes against the promulgation of such law as the political party protecting itself from the findings that could surface if such declarations were to be made.
- In November 2017, Aristegui Noticias reported that "the PRI and their allies were seeking to approve the "Ley de Seguridad Interior (Law of Internal Security)". The Mexican National Human Rights Commission (CNDH) had previously said that law violated human rights, because it favors the discretional usage of the army forces. The CNDH said it "endangered citizens by giving a blank check to the army" and the president to order an attack towards any group of people they consider a danger without requiring an explanation. This could include people such as social activists.

== Second time in opposition: 2018–present ==
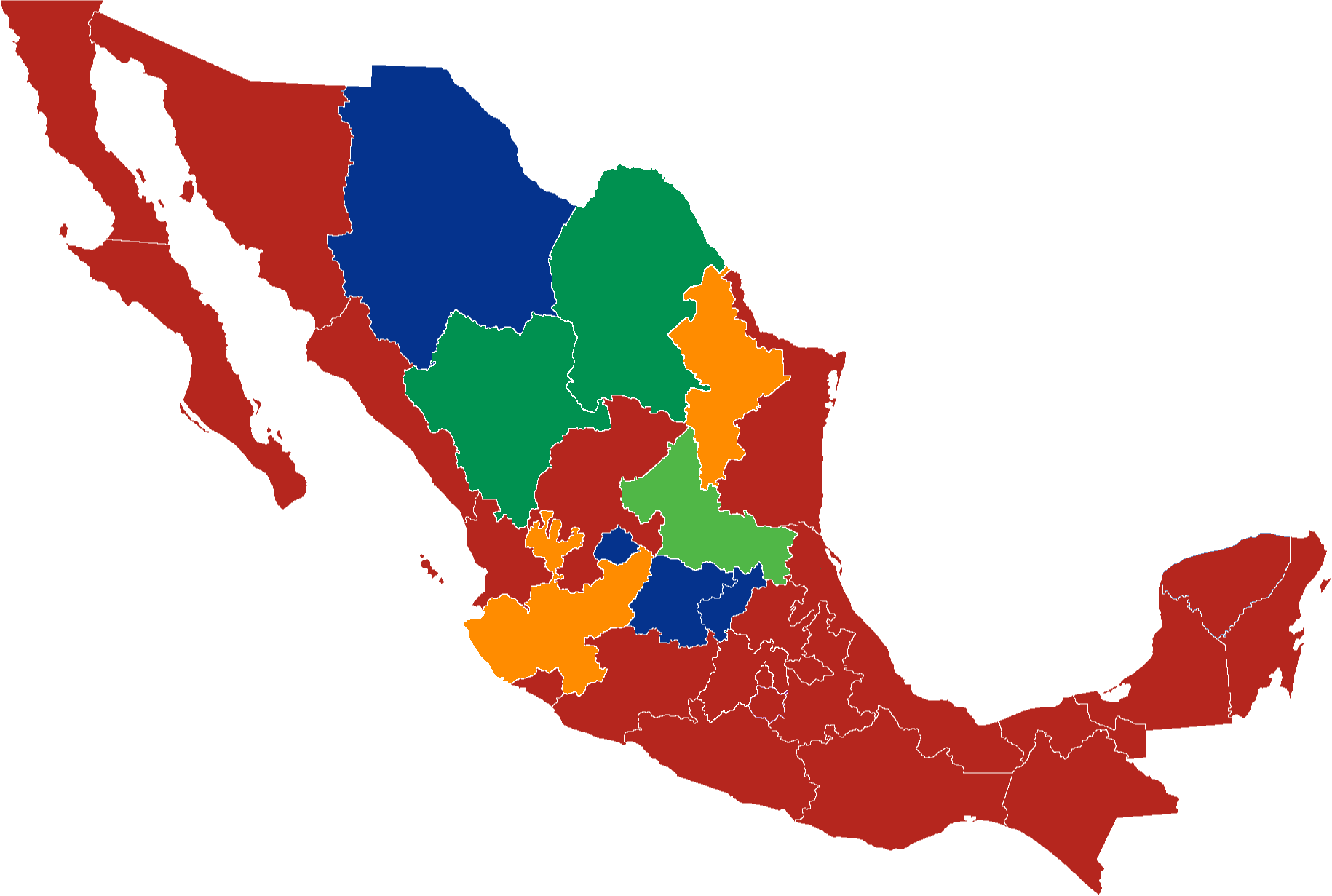
States governed by the PRI in 2024

On 27 November 2017, José Antonio Meade announced he would compete in the 2018 presidential election, representing the PRI. He was reported to have been handpicked directly by president Peña Nieto through the traditional and now controversial practice known as El Dedazo (literally, "the finger strike", evoking an image of the incumbent president directly pointing towards his successor).

There were concerns about the possibility of fraud in the presidential election following allegations of electoral fraud concerning the election of Enrique Peña Nieto's cousin Alfredo del Mazo Maza as governor of the state of Mexico, in December 2017. The Mexican newspaper Regeneración, which is officially linked to the MORENA party, warned about the possibility of the PRI committing an electoral fraud. Cited was the controversial law of internal security that the PRI senators approved as the means to diminish the protests towards such electoral fraud. Bloomberg News also supported that possible outcome, with Tony Payan, director of the Houston's Mexico Center at Rice University's Baker Institute, suggesting that both vote buyouts and computer hackings were possible, citing the 1988 previous electoral fraud committed by the PRI. Bloomberg's article also suggested Meade could also receive unfair help from the over-budget amounts of money spent in publicity by incumbent president Enrique Peña Nieto (who also campaigned with the PRI). A December 2017 article in The New York Times reported Peña Nieto spending about US$2 billion on publicity during his first five years as president, the largest publicity budget ever spent by a Mexican president. Additionally, the article noted the concerns of news journalists, 68 percent of whom claimed to not believe they had enough freedom of speech. To support the statement, the cited award-winning news reporter Carmen Aristegui, who was controversially fired shortly after revealing the Mexican White House scandals concerning a conflict of interest regarding a house owned by Peña Nieto.

In April 2018, Forbes magazine republished a story by British television news program Channel 4 News claiming the existence of proof of ties between the PRI and Cambridge Analytica, which was previously implicated in Russian meddling in the 2016 U.S. presidential election, suggesting a "modus operandi" in Mexico similar to the one in the United States. The information indicated they worked together at least until January 2018. An investigation was requested. The PRI has denied ever contracting Cambridge Analytica. The New York Times acquired the 57-page proposal of Cambridge Analytica's outlining a strategy of collaboration to benefit the PRI by hurting MORENA's candidate López Obrador. The political party rejected Cambridge Analytica's offer but paid the firm to not help the other candidates.

In the 2018 general election, as part of the Todos por México coalition, the PRI suffered a monumental legislative defeat, scoring the lowest number of seats in the party's history. Presidential candidate José Antonio Meade also only scored 16.4% of the votes, finishing in third place, while the party only managed to elect 42 deputies (down from 203 of 2015) and 14 senators (down from 61 in 2012). The PRI was also defeated in each of the nine elections for state governor; the National Regeneration Movement won four, PAN three, and the Social Encounter Party and Citizens' Movement each with one.

Amid the party's worsening electoral performance, it has attempted to redefine itself as a social democratic party since 2021.

In the 2024 general election, as part of the Fuerza y Corazón por México coalition, the party supported independent candidate Xóchitl Gálvez (considered close to the National Action Party) for President, who finished in second place. The party recorded its worst result by vote share in its history, although narrowly managed to avoid its worst seat results thanks to a slight gain made in the Senate. It was also the first time in its history that the party failed to win at least 10 constituency seats in the Chamber of Deputies.

== Election results ==
=== Presidential elections 1929–2024 ===
Election	Candidate	Votes	%	Outcome	Notes
1929	Pascual Ortiz Rubio	1,947,848	93.6	✓ Elected	As PNR, first election after the formation of the party. The opposition candidate José Vasconcelos claimed victory for himself and refused to recognize the official results, claiming that the elections were rigged; then he unsuccessfully attempted to organize an armed revolt.
1934	Lázaro Cárdenas	2,225,000	98.2	✓ Elected	As PNR. Revolutionary general. First president to serve a six-year term; chosen by Calles as party candidate
1940	Manuel Ávila Camacho	2,476,641	93.9	✓ Elected	As PRM. Revolutionary general. The opposition candidate Juan Andreu Almazán refused to recognize the official results, claiming that a massive electoral fraud had taken place. He later fled to Cuba and unsuccessfully tried to organize an armed revolt.
1946	Miguel Alemán Valdés	1,786,901	77.9	✓ Elected	First civilian president since the Mexican Revolution.
1952	Adolfo Ruiz Cortines	2,713,419	74.3	✓ Elected	The opposition candidate Miguel Henríquez Guzmán claimed victory and refused to recognize the official results, claiming that massive electoral fraud had taken place.
1958	Adolfo López Mateos	6,767,754	90.4	✓ Elected	First Mexican presidential elections in which women were allowed to vote.
1964	Gustavo Díaz Ordaz	8,368,446	88.8	✓ Elected	
1970	Luis Echeverría	11,970,893	86.0	✓ Elected	
1976	José López Portillo	16,727,993	100.0	✓ Elected	Elected unopposed.
1982	Miguel de la Madrid	16,748,006	74.3	✓ Elected	Last election where the PRI faced no serious opposition.
1988	Carlos Salinas de Gortari	9,687,926	50.7	✓ Elected	All of the opposition parties claimed that the election was rigged and refused to recognize the official results; Cuauhtémoc Cárdenas and Manuel Clouthier both claimed victory. First election where the PRI candidate received under 70% of the vote.
1994	Ernesto Zedillo	17,181,651	48.6	✓ Elected	Chosen as the PRI candidate after the 23 March 1994 assassination of Luis Donaldo Colosio.
2000	Francisco Labastida	13,579,718	36.1	✗ Defeated	First PRI presidential candidate chosen by a primary. First loss in a presidential election.
2006	Roberto Madrazo	9,301,441	22.2	✗ Defeated	Coalition: Alianza por México.
2012	Enrique Peña Nieto	19,226,284	38.2	✓ Elected	Coalition: Compromiso por México
2018	José Antonio Meade	9,289,378	16.4	✗ Defeated	Coalition: Todos por México
2024	Xóchitl Gálvez	5,736,759	9.77	✗ Defeated	Vote totals are only for the PRI line of the Fuerza y Corazón por México coalition. First time PRI made a coalition with PAN. First woman nominee.

=== Congressional elections ===
==== Chamber of Deputies ====
Election	Constituency		PR		No. of seats	Position	Presidency	Note
Election	Votes	%	Votes	%	No. of seats	Position	Presidency	Note
1934					173 / 173	Supermajority	Lázaro Cárdenas	
1940					172 / 173	Supermajority	Manuel Ávila Camacho	
1943	376,000	92.1			147 / 147	Supermajority	Manuel Ávila Camacho	
1946	1,687,284	73.5			141 / 147	Supermajority	Miguel Alemán Valdés	
1949	2,031,783	93.9			142 / 149	Supermajority	Miguel Alemán Valdés	
1952	2,713,419	74.3			151 / 161	Supermajority	Adolfo Ruiz Cortines	
1955	5,562,761	89.9			153 / 162	Supermajority	Adolfo Ruiz Cortines	
1958	6,467,493	88.2			153 / 162	Supermajority	Adolfo López Mateos	
1961	6,178,434	90.3			172 / 178	Supermajority	Adolfo López Mateos	
1964	7,807,912	86.3			175 / 210	Supermajority	Gustavo Díaz Ordaz	
1967	8,342,114	83.9			177 / 210	Supermajority	Gustavo Díaz Ordaz	
1970	11,125,770	83.3			178 / 210	Supermajority	Luis Echeverría Álvarez	
1973		77.3			189 / 232	Supermajority	Luis Echeverría Álvarez	
1976	12,868,104	85.0			195 / 237	Supermajority	José López Portillo	
1979	9,418,178	72.8			296 / 400	Supermajority	José López Portillo	
1982	14,501,988	69.4	14,289,793	65.7	299 / 400	Supermajority	Miguel de la Madrid	
1985	11,575,063	68.1	10,981,938	63.3	289 / 400	Supermajority	Miguel de la Madrid	
1988	9,276,934	51.0	9,276,934	51.0	260 / 500	Majority	Carlos Salinas de Gortari	First loss of supermajority
1991	14,051,349	61.4	14,145,234	61.4	320 / 500	Majority	Carlos Salinas de Gortari	
1994	16,851,082	50.2	17,236,836	50.3	300 / 500	Majority	Ernesto Zedillo	
1997	11,305,957	39.1	11,438,719	39.1	239 / 500	Minority	Ernesto Zedillo	First loss of majority
2000	13,720,453	36.9	13,800,306	36.9	207 / 500	Opposition	Vicente Fox	
2003	6,166,358	23.9	6,196,171	24.0	224 / 500	Opposition	Vicente Fox	
2006	11,629,727	28.0	11,689,110	27.9	104 / 500	Opposition	Felipe Calderón	Coalition: Alliance for Mexico
2009	12,765,938	36.9	12,809,365	36.9	237 / 500	Opposition	Felipe Calderón	
2012	15,166,531	31.0	15,513,478	31.8	212 / 500	Minority	Enrique Peña Nieto	Coalition: Commitment to Mexico
2015	11,604,665	34.2	11,638,556	29.2	203 / 500	Minority	Enrique Peña Nieto	Coalition: Commitment to Mexico
2018	4,351,824	7.78	9,310,523	16.54	45 / 500	Opposition	Andrés Manuel López Obrador	Coalition: Todos por México. First time not obtaining at least 100 seats or 10% of the constituency vote.
2021	2,715,123	5.56	8,715,899	17.73	69 / 500	Opposition	Andrés Manuel López Obrador	Coalition: Va por México
2024	101,574	0.18	6,623,796	11.57	35 / 500	Opposition	Claudia Sheinbaum	Coalition: Fuerza y Corazón por México. First time not obtaining at least 10 constituency seats.

==== Senate elections ====
Election	Constituency		PR		No. of seats	Position	Presidency	Note
Election	Votes	%	Votes	%	No. of seats	Position	Presidency	Note
1964			7,837,364	87.8	64 / 64	Supermajority	Gustavo Díaz Ordaz	
1970			11,154,003	84.4	64 / 64	Supermajority	Luis Echeverría Álvarez	
1976			13,406,825	87.5	64 / 64	Supermajority	José López Portillo	
1982					63 / 64	Supermajority	Miguel de la Madrid	
1988			9,263,810	50.8	60 / 64	Supermajority	Carlos Salinas de Gortari	
1994			17,195,536	50.2	95 / 128	Supermajority	Ernesto Zedillo	
1997			11,266,155	38.5	77 / 128	Majority	Ernesto Zedillo	First loss of supermajority
2000	13,699,799	36.7	13,755,787	36.7	60 / 128	Opposition	Vicente Fox	First loss of majority
2006	11,622,012	28.1	11,681,395	28.0	39 / 128	Opposition	Felipe Calderón	Coalition: Alliance for Mexico
2012	18,477,441	37.0	18,560,755	36.9	52 / 128	Minority	Enrique Peña Nieto	Coalition: Commitment to Mexico
2018	3,855,984	6.86	9,013,658	15.90	13 / 128	Opposition	Andrés Manuel López Obrador	Coalition: Todos por México
2024	316,636	0.55	6,530,305	11.33	16 / 128	Opposition	Claudia Sheinbaum	Coalition: Fuerza y Corazón por México

== In popular culture ==
The 1999 film Herod's Law, directed by Luis Estrada, is a political satire of corruption in Mexico under the PRI regime. It was notably the first film to criticize the PRI explicitly by name and carried some controversy and censorship attempts from the Mexican government because of it.

A latter Estrada film, The Perfect Dictatorship (2014), dealt with the political favoritism of Televisa towards the PRI, and the concept of the "cortinas de humo (smoke screens)" was explored in the Mexican black-comedy film, whose plot directly criticizes both the PRI and Televisa. Taking place in a Mexico with a tightly controlled media landscape, the plot centers around a corrupt politician (a fictional stand-in for Enrique Peña Nieto) from a political party (serving as a fictional stand-in for the PRI), and how he makes a deal with TV MX (which serves as a stand-in to Televisa) to manipulate the diffusion of news towards his benefit, in order to save his political career. The director made it based on the perceived media manipulation in Mexico.

In 2025, journalist Denise Maerker premiered the documentary series PRI: Crónica del Fin (transl. PRI: Chronicle of the End) on the streaming platform Vix. The series features interviews with former PRI presidents and prominent party figures, including Enrique Peña Nieto, Carlos Salinas de Gortari, Francisco Labastida, Beatriz Paredes, Manlio Fabio Beltrones, Miguel Ángel Osorio Chong, and Alito Moreno, as well as other political figures such as Marcelo Ebrard, Vicente Fox, and Cuauhtémoc Cárdenas. It explores the party's seventy-year political history in Mexico, combining stock footage and news reports from Jacobo Zabludovsky with exclusive testimonies from former leaders and party affiliates, and also addresses controversial figures like Elba Esther Gordillo, reflecting on the PRI's influence on the country's political landscape.

== See also ==
- History of democracy in Mexico
