= Miguel Ángel García Domínguez =

Mexican lawyer and politician

- Born: 20 December 1931; San Miguel de Allende, Guanajuato, Mexico
- Died: 27 June 2014 (aged 82); Mallorca, Baleares, Spain
- Education: National Autonomous University of Mexico
- Occupations: Lawyer and politician
- Political party: PRD
- Spouse: Maria Begoña Goiricelya Asla
- Children: Ricardo Gracia, Guadalupe Garcia, Barbara Garcia, Maria Teresa Garcia, Monica Garcia, Edurne Garcia, Yosune Garcia, and Iñaki Garcia
- Relatives: Grandchildren Luis Alberto Villarreal, Ricardo Villarreal, Iker Garcia, Begoña Garcia

Miguel Ángel García Domínguez (20 December 1931 – 27 June 2014) was a Mexican lawyer and politician affiliated with the Party of the Democratic Revolution. As of 2014 he served as Deputy of the LIX Legislature of the Mexican Congress representing the Federal District.
