= José Alberto Benavides =

Mexican politician

- Born: 27 November 1980 (age 45); Federal District, Mexico
- Occupation: Deputy
- Political party: PT

José Alberto Benavides Castañeda (born 27 November 1980) is a Mexican politician affiliated with the Labor Party (PT). In the 2012 general election he was elected to the Chamber of Deputies to represent the Federal District's 20th district. He returned to Congress in the 2024 general election for Mexico City's 2nd district.
