= Mexicana de Aviación Flight 704 =

1969 aviation accident

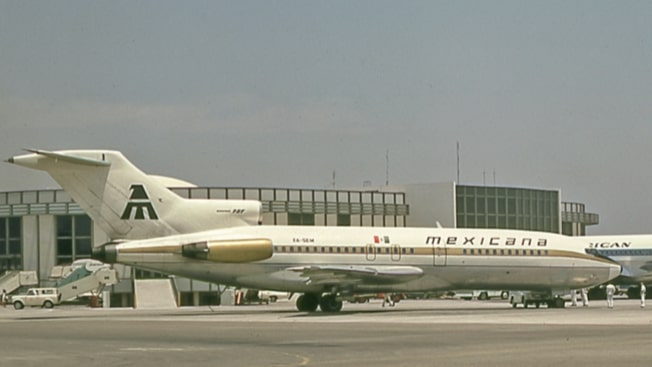
- A Mexicana Boeing 727, similar to the one involved

Accident
- Date: 4 June 1969
- Summary: Controlled flight into terrain
- Site: Apodaca, Nuevo León

Aircraft
- Aircraft type: Boeing 727-64
- Aircraft name: Azteca de Oro
- Operator: Mexicana de Aviación
- Registration: XA-SEL
- Flight origin: Lic. Benito Juarez International Airport
- Destination: Del Norte International Airport
- Occupants: 79
- Passengers: 72
- Crew: 7
- Fatalities: 79
- Survivors: 0

On 4 June 1969, Mexicana de Aviación Flight 704, a Boeing 727 airliner registered XA-SEL, crashed near El Carmen, some 20 miles north of the city of Monterrey, Nuevo León. All 79 people on board were killed.

== Accident ==
Flight MX704 departed Mexico City, bound for Monterrey, at 07:02 local time. The flight was uneventful until approach, when the crew began descending at a vertical speed of 1500–1600 ft / min (460–490 m / min) at an airspeed of 250 knots. During its approach to Del Norte International Airport, the crew contacted the landing controller and requested weather conditions and traffic information. The dispatcher reported that the weather over the airport was cloudy with a lower boundary of 500 feet (150 m) with haze, light raining, and no other aircraft in the airport zone. The crew asked if the radio beacon at Ciénega de Flores was operating, and received word that it was not functioning due to an electrical power outage. Flight 704 then reported that, for some reason, they received a signal similar to the signal from this beacon. The crew then reported the airport in sight, and began to carry out the final approach. This was the last transmission from the aircraft.

The aircraft ended up destroyed in the Cerro del Fraile mountain range, killing all 79 people on board. The crash was the deadliest aviation accident on Mexican soil until Mexicana Flight 940, another Boeing 727, crashed on 31 March 1986, killing all 167 people on board.

== Aircraft ==
The aircraft involved was a two-year-old Boeing 727-064 registered XA-SEL (factory - 19256, serial - 355) The aircraft's maiden flight was on 6 January 1967. On 17 January, the aircraft was delivered to Mexicana de Aviación (later re-branded as Mexicana), where it was named Azteca de Oro. The aircraft was powered by three Pratt & Whitney JT8D-7B turbofan engines.

== Crew ==
The captain was Guillermo García Ramos, a World War II veteran. He was experienced in both military and commercial aviation. He had 15,000 flying hours on commercial aircraft. The first officer was Carlos de Iturbide Magallón. The flight engineer was Alfonso Navarro Mazzini.

== Notable passengers ==
Notable passengers on the flight included politician Carlos A. Madrazo, tennis star Rafael Osuna and the architect Jorge González Reyna.

== Investigation ==
The investigating board was unable to determine the reason for such a deviation, since the last few minutes of the recording were absent from the cockpit voice recorder. It was also not possible to determine which radio beacon the flight crew had reported receiving, as the airport radio beacon was not working at the time due to loss of electrical power. Since the prominent Carlos Madrazo was on board, there were also hypotheses regarding political assassination.

== Conspiracy theories ==
Some Mexican media, such as Uno TV, have argued that the accident was a premeditated, political assassination act, since politician Carlos Madrazo was in the aircraft at the time of the accident. In an interview with Proceso magazine, writer Patricia Rosas Lopátegui also argued that the accident was a political assassination targeting Madrazo.
