= Rosa María de la Garza =

Mexican politician

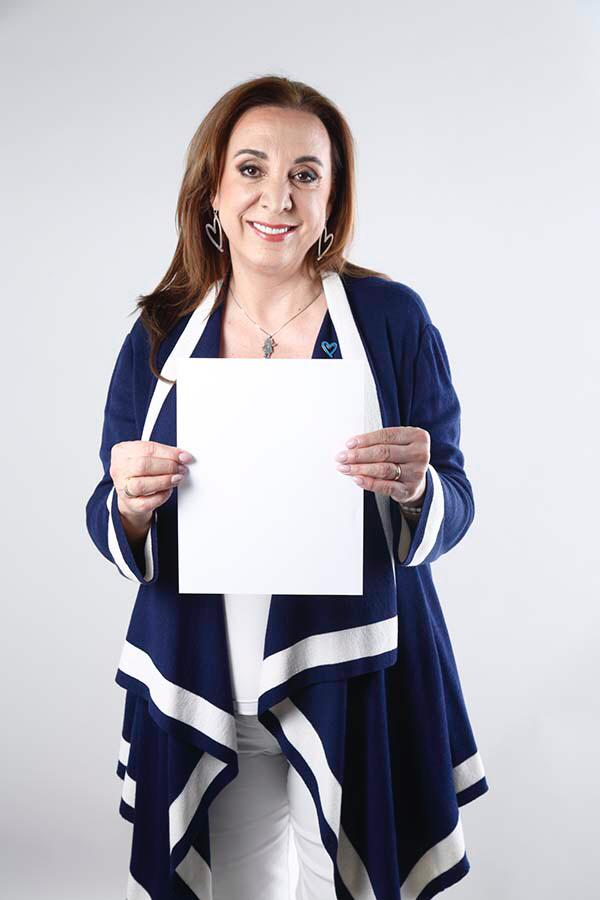
- Orozco promoting the Hoja en Blanco Campaign against Trafficking in Persons
- Born: Rosa María de la Garza Ramírez; 6 July 1960 (age 65); Mexico City, Mexico
- Status: Married
- Other name: Rosi Orozco
- Occupation: Activist

Rosa María de la Garza Ramírez (born July 6, 1960), also known as Rosi Orozco, is a Mexican activist campaigning against human trafficking in Mexico.

== Early activism ==
Orozco was first introduced to the plight of human trafficking victims around the world when she attended a training conducted by the organization Concerned Women for America and the United States Justice Department in 2005. She returned home committed to opening a shelter for girls who were victims of human trafficking. She quickly realized that there was very little knowledge about trafficking in persons in Mexico; Orozco set out to remedy that, and in 2007 opened the first shelter for girls in Mexico City.

== Political career ==
After four years of learning and speaking to anyone she could about the topic, Orozco realized that without a strong law, this crime could not be eradicated. She was invited by the PAN Party to run for Congress. Although she never officially registered or affiliated with the party, she did win the seat. From 2009 to 2012, she served as Deputy (Congresswoman) of the LXI Legislature of the Mexican Congress representing the Federal District's second electoral district. She held a number of committee positions, including president of the Special Commission for the Fight against Trafficking in Persons. She campaigned for a change to human trafficking laws and was a key player in the passage of the General Law to Prevent, Punish and Eradicate Crimes of Human Trafficking and to Protect and Assist the Victims of This Crime, in 2012.

== Post-Congress activism ==
After her time in Congress, Orozco became a full-time activist dedicated to the protection of victims of trafficking and to continue pushing for stronger legislation. Orozco is the President of United vs Trafficking. In 2013, Orozco helped establish and launch a Trafficking in Persons hotline for the purpose of receiving and giving attention to reports on trafficking by citizens.

== Legal challenges ==
Orozco asked to be investigated by the Central Investigation for Special Causes Agency of the State of Mexico City's District Attorney Office after accusations came from a sitting senator that she was profiting from government funds and having a network of companies managed on her behalf by her relatives to obtain contracts and agreements for public resources. These accusations came within the context of strong opposition to reforms being pushed through in the Senate that would gravely affect the current law and would set traffickers free. Rosi Orozco was found to be clean of all the accusations, and thus has taken legal action against the senator.

== Nobel Prize nomination ==
During the Global Sustainability Network Summit in February 2019, the Secretary of Human Rights of the State of Mexico communicated that the agency that he heads would nominate Orozco as a candidate for the Nobel Prize for her trajectory as a human rights activist. The letter of intent has been sent to the Nobel Foundation.

== Awards ==
For her work against trafficking, Orozco has been awarded several important recognitions both internationally and nationally:

2011

- Omecíhuatl Medal - National Institute of Women
- 50 Mujeres que mueven Mexico - Quien Magazine

2012

- 150 Most Courageous Women - Newsweek New York
- Premio a la Actitud Positiva en el Bien Público - Cumbre de Comunicación
- Golden Microphone - Broadcasters Association of Mexico

2013, 2014, 2016, 2017, 2018

- 50 Most powerful women in Mexico - Forbes Magazine Mexico

2013

- Unlikely Heroes Award - Unlikely Heroes Organization

2014

- Paloma de Plata - Convivencia sin Violencia
- Recognition for the advancement of the fight against trafficking - Proconciencia, France

2015

- Recognition Profesora Enriqueta López de Cabrera - Universidad Realística de México
- 20 Leaders of 2015 - Mujer Ejecutiva Magazine

2016

- Golden Microphone - Broadcasters Association of Mexico

2018

- Those Who Inspire Award

== Published works ==
2011

- Del Cielo al Infierno - Publicaciones Diamante

2012

- Cuidado con Malgato

2016

- Explotacion Sexual - Esclavitud como negocio familiar - LD Book
