= 1943 Mexican legislative election =

Legislative elections were held in Mexico on Sunday 15 August 1943. The Party of the Mexican Revolution won all 147 seats in the Chamber of Deputies.

== Results ==
The Party of the Mexican Revolution received 92% of the vote and won all of the seats against the National Action Party (PAN), which received only 5%. The remaining 3% went to unregistered candidates of the Mexican Communist Party (PCM).

Party	Votes	%	Seats	+/–
Party of the Mexican Revolution	376,000	92.13	147	–25
National Action Party	21,749	5.33	0	–
Non-registered candidates	10,352	2.54	0	–
Total	408,101	100.00	147	–26
Registered voters/turnout	2,124,549	–		
Source: Nohlen
