= Dolores Padierna =

Mexican politician (born 1958)

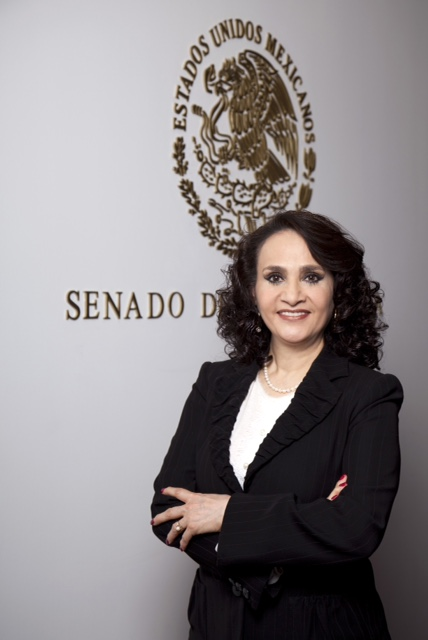
- Padierna during her 2012–2018 Senate term

Member of the Chamber of Deputies for Mexico City's 4th district
- Incumbent
- Assumed office 1 September 2024
- Preceded by: Gerardo Fernández Noroña

Vice President of the Chamber of Deputies
- Incumbent
- Assumed office 1 September 2018
- President: Porfirio Muñoz Ledo
- Preceded by: Martha Tamayo

Member of the Chamber of Deputies for Mexico City's 12th district
- Incumbent
- Assumed office 1 September 2018
- Preceded by: Alicia Barrientos Pantoja
- Succeeded by: Gabriela Sodi Miranda

Member of the Chamber of Deputies for the Federal District's 8th district
- In office 1 September 2003 – 31 August 2006
- Preceded by: Mauro Huerta Díaz
- Succeeded by: Armando Barreiro Pérez
- In office 1 September 1997 – 31 August 2000
- Preceded by: Jesús Rodríguez y Rodríguez
- Succeeded by: Mauro Huerta Díaz

Personal details
- Born: 8 May 1958 (age 68) Dolores Hidalgo, Guanajuato, Mexico
- Party: MORENA
- Occupation: Politician

María de los Dolores Padierna Luna (born 8 May 1958) is a Mexican politician. A founding member of the Party of the Democratic Revolution (PRD), she left the party in September 2017. She later joined the National Regeneration Movement (Morena).

From 2000 to 2003, she served as the elected mayor of Cuauhtémoc, D.F.

She was a plurinominal senator during the 62nd and 63rd Congresses (2012–2018). She also served as a federal deputy in 1997–2000, 2003–2006 and 2018–2021.

Padierna Luna was the candidate for mayor in Cuauhtémoc, Mexico City, for the National Regeneration Movement (Morena) in the 2021 election despite accusations that she and her husband, René Bejarano, were corrupt. She lost to Sandra Cuevas of the PRD.

In the 2024 general election, she was elected to the Chamber of Deputies to represent Mexico City's fourth district for the 2024–2027 congressional session.
