= Jaime Cárdenas Gracia =

Mexican politician

Member of the Chamber of Deputies for the Federal District's 4th district
- In office 1 September 2009 – 31 August 2012
- Preceded by: Lourdes Alonso Flores
- Succeeded by: Carlos Augusto Morales López

Personal details
- Born: 17 February 1960 (age 66) Parras de la Fuente, Coahuila, Mexico
- Party: PT
- Education: National Autonomous University of Mexico
- Occupation: Politician

Jaime Fernando Cárdenas Gracia (Note: In this Mexican name, the surname is Cárdenas and the second or maternal family name is Gracia.) (born 17 February 1960) is a Mexican politician from the Labor Party (PT). From 2009 to 2012, he served as a federal deputy in the 61st Congress, representing the Federal District's fourth district.

He has received various awards and recognitions, such as the Ignacio Manuel Altamirano Annual Prize in 1994 and the National Journalism Award in 2004.

He was invited as an expert to the international group that reviewed the technical input that supported the establishment of the Constituent Assembly in Bolivia in 2006.

He served as a Judicial Councilor for the Federal District from 2007 to 2008. He was nominated by the Labor Party for federal deputy for the 4th federal electoral district of the Federal District (Iztapalapa). He served as a constituent deputy for Mexico City from 2016 to 2017.
