= 12th federal electoral district of Mexico City =

Federal electoral district of Mexico

Mexico City's 12th
- Electoral district of the Chamber of Deputies of Mexico

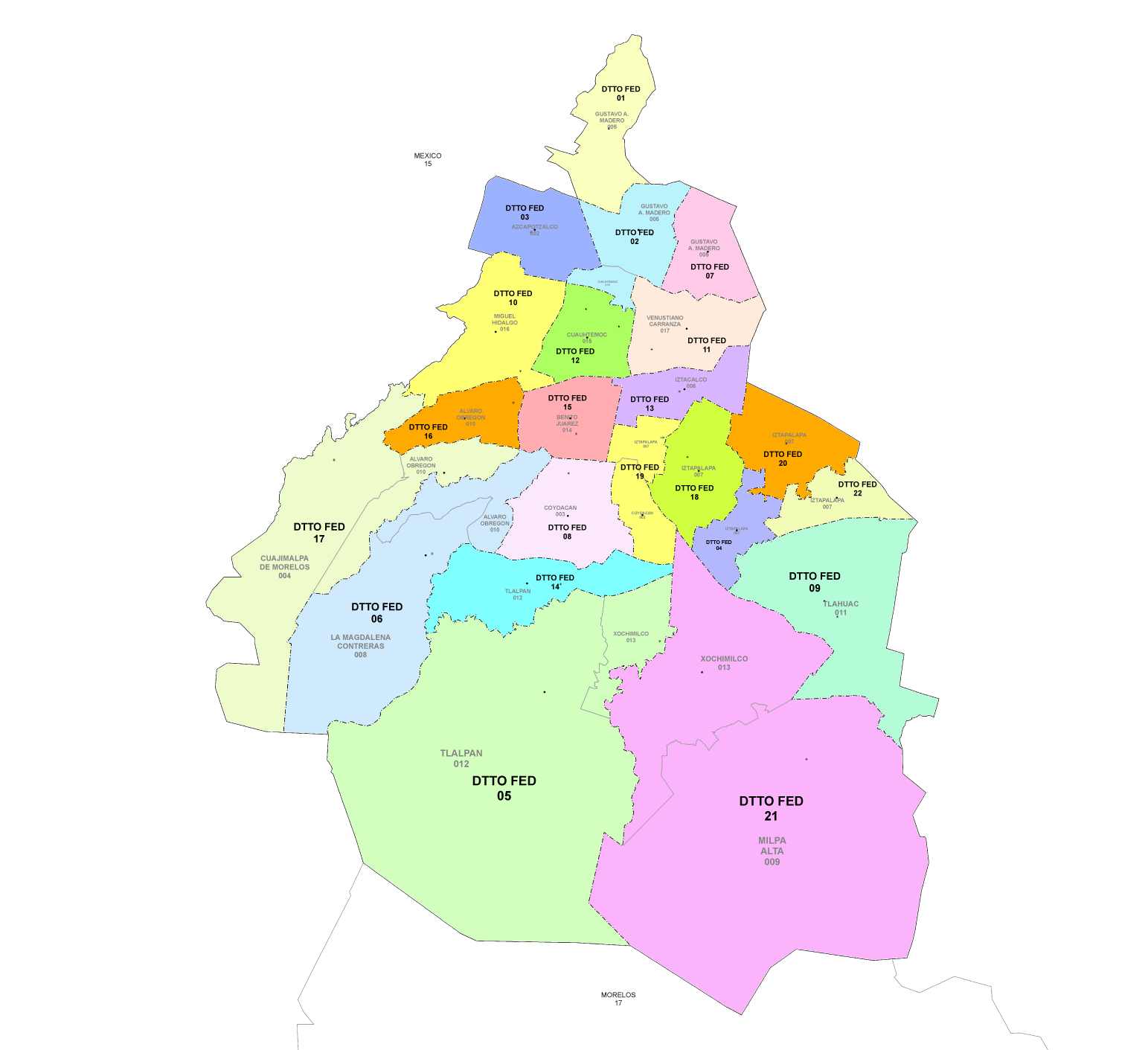
- 12th district since 2023

Incumbent
- Member: Mónica Sandoval Hernández
- Party: ▌Institutional Revolutionary Party
- Congress: 66th (2024–2027)

District
- State: Mexico City
- Head town: Cuauhtémoc
- Coordinates: 19°26′35″N 99°08′40″W
- Covers: Cuauhtémoc (part)
- PR region: Fourth
- Precincts: 300
- Population: 410,623 (2020 census)

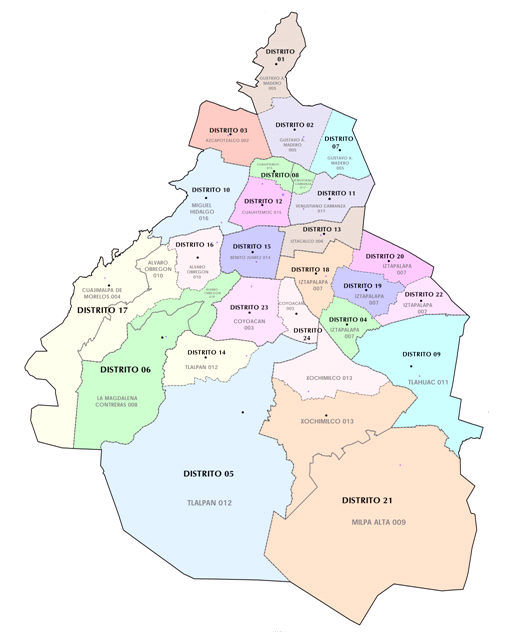
Mexico City under the 2017–2022 districting plan

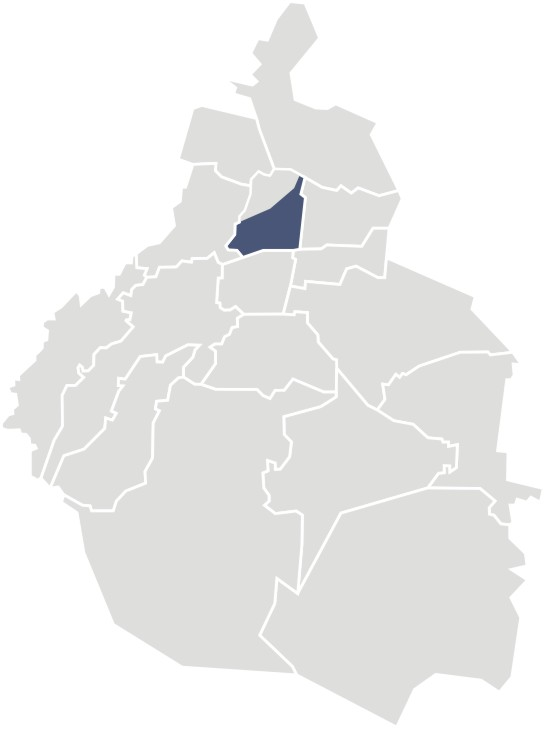
12th district in 2005–2017

The 12th federal electoral district of Mexico City (Spanish: Distrito electoral federal 12 de la Ciudad de México; previously "of the Federal District") is one of the 300 electoral districts into which Mexico is divided for elections to the federal Chamber of Deputies and one of 22 such districts in Mexico City.

It elects one deputy to the lower house of Congress for each three-year legislative session by means of the first-past-the-post system. Votes cast in the district also count towards the calculation of proportional representation ("plurinominal") deputies elected from the fourth region.

The current member for the district, elected in the 2024 general election, is Mónica Elizabeth Sandoval Hernández. Originally elected for the Party of the Democratic Revolution (PRD), she switched allegiance to the Institutional Revolutionary Party (PRI) after the PRD lost its registration as a national party in the aftermath of the election.

== District territory ==
Under the 2023 districting plan adopted by the National Electoral Institute (INE), which is to be used for the 2024, 2027 and 2030 federal elections, the 12th district covers the bulk of the borough (alcaldía) of Cuauhtémoc, comprising 300 electoral precincts (secciones electorales). The exception is the northernmost strip, which is assigned to the 2nd district. The 12th district thus covers Mexico City's Centro Histórico.

The district reported a population of 410,623 in the 2020 census.

== Previous districting schemes ==
Evolution of electoral district numbers
	1974	1978	1996	2005	2017	2023
Mexico City (Federal District)	27	40	30	27	24	22
Chamber of Deputies	196	300				

2017–2022

From 2017 to 2022, the district covered a portion of the borough of Cuauhtémoc.

2005–2017

Under the 2005 districting scheme, the 12th district covered that portion of the borough of Cuauhtémoc to the south and east of Paseo de la Reforma and Calzada de Guadalupe.

1996–2005

Between 1996 and 2005, the district covered the southern and western portions of Cuauhtémoc.

1978–1996

The districting scheme in force from 1978 to 1996 was the result of the 1977 electoral reforms, which increased the number of single-member seats in the Chamber of Deputies from 196 to 300. Under that plan, the Federal District's seat allocation rose from 27 to 40. The 12th district covered portions of the boroughs of Gustavo A. Madero and Venustiano Carranza.

== Deputies returned to Congress ==
(Mexico) National parties
- Current
- PAN
- PRI
- PT
- PVEM
- MC
- Morena
- PAZ
- Somos
- Defunct or local only
- PLM
- PNR
- PRM
- PNM
- PP
- PPS
- PARM
- PFCRN
- CON
- PANAL
- PSD
- PES
- PES
- PRD

Mexico City's 12th district
Election	Deputy	Party	Term	Legislature
1916	Alfonso Herrera		1916–1917	Constituent Congress of Querétaro
1917	Miguel A. Peralta	PLC	1917–1918	27th Congress
1918	Federico Silva	PLN	1918–1920	28th Congress
1920	Carlos Argüelles	PLC	1920–1922	29th Congress
1922; 1924	Luis N. Morones	Laborist Party (Mexico)	1922–1926	30th Congress; 31st Congress
1926	Ricardo Treviño	Laborist Party (Mexico)	1926–1928	32nd Congress
1928	Carlos Almazán	POI	1928–1930	33rd Congress
1930	Suspended		1930–1932	34th Congress
1932	Tomás A. Robinson	Institutional Revolutionary Party	1932–1934	35th Congress
1934	José G. Huerta	Institutional Revolutionary Party	1934–1937	36th Congress
1937	León García	Institutional Revolutionary Party	1937–1940	37th Congress
1940	Aarón Camacho López	PRUN	1940–1943	38th Congress
1943	Leopoldo Hernández	Institutional Revolutionary Party	1943–1946	39th Congress
1946	Trinidad Rosales Rojas	Institutional Revolutionary Party	1946–1949	40th Congress
1949	Enrique Rangel Meléndez	Institutional Revolutionary Party	1949–1952	41st Congress
1952	Heriberto Garrido Ordóñez	Institutional Revolutionary Party	1952–1955	42nd Congress
1955	Juan Gómez Salas	Institutional Revolutionary Party	1955–1958	43rd Congress
1958	Adán Hernández Rojas	Institutional Revolutionary Party	1958–1961	44th Congress
1961	Rodolfo García Pérez	Institutional Revolutionary Party	1961–1964	45th Congress
1964	Martha Andrade de Del Rosal	Institutional Revolutionary Party	1964–1967	46th Congress
1967	Martín Guaida Lara	Institutional Revolutionary Party	1967–1970	47th Congress
1970	Ignacio Sologuren Martínez	Institutional Revolutionary Party	1970–1973	48th Congress
1973	Alberto Juárez Blancas	Institutional Revolutionary Party	1973–1976	49th Congress
1976	Miguel López Riveroll	Institutional Revolutionary Party	1976–1979	50th Congress
1979	Roberto Castellanos Tovar	Institutional Revolutionary Party	1979–1982	51st Congress
1982	Wulfrano Leyva Salas	Institutional Revolutionary Party	1982–1985	52nd Congress
1985	Joaquín López Martínez	Institutional Revolutionary Party	1985–1988	53rd Congress
1988	Fernando Sologuren Bautista	Institutional Revolutionary Party	1988–1991	54th Congress
1991	Roberto Castellano Tovar	Institutional Revolutionary Party	1991–1994	55th Congress
1994	José Noe Moreno Carvajal	Institutional Revolutionary Party	1994–1997	56th Congress
1997	Estrella Vázquez Osorno	Party of the Democratic Revolution	1997–2000	57th Congress
2000	Samuel Yoselevitz Fraustro	National Action Party (Mexico)	2000–2003	58th Congress
2003	Francisco Javier Saucedo	Party of the Democratic Revolution	2003–2006	59th Congress
2006	José Alfonso Suárez del Real	Party of the Democratic Revolution	2006–2009	60th Congress
2009	Agustín Guerrero Castillo	Party of the Democratic Revolution	2009–2012	61st Congress
2012	José Luis Muñoz Soria	Party of the Democratic Revolution	2012–2015	62nd Congress
2015	Alicia Barrientos Pantoja	National Regeneration Movement	2015–2018	63rd Congress
2018	Dolores Padierna Luna (Note: Padierna Luna resigned her seat to contend for the mayoralty of Cuauhtémoc, Mexico City, and was replaced by her alternate, Navarro Pérez, on 7 April 2021.); Montserrat Navarro Pérez	National Regeneration Movement	2018–2021; 2021	64th Congress
2021	Gabriela Sodi Miranda	Party of the Democratic Revolution	2021–2024	65th Congress
2024	Mónica Elizabeth Sandoval Hernández (Note: Following the cancellation of the PRD's registration in the aftermath of the election, Sandoval Hernández aligned herself with the PRI on 20 September 2024.)	Party of the Democratic Revolution Institutional Revolutionary Party	2024–2027	66th Congress

== Presidential elections ==
Mexico City's 12th district
Election	District won by	Party or coalition	%
2018	Andrés Manuel López Obrador	Juntos Haremos Historia	54.4055
2024	Claudia Sheinbaum Pardo	Sigamos Haciendo Historia	48.1074
