= 4th federal electoral district of Mexico City =

Federal electoral district of Mexico

Mexico City's 4th
- Electoral district of the Chamber of Deputies of Mexico

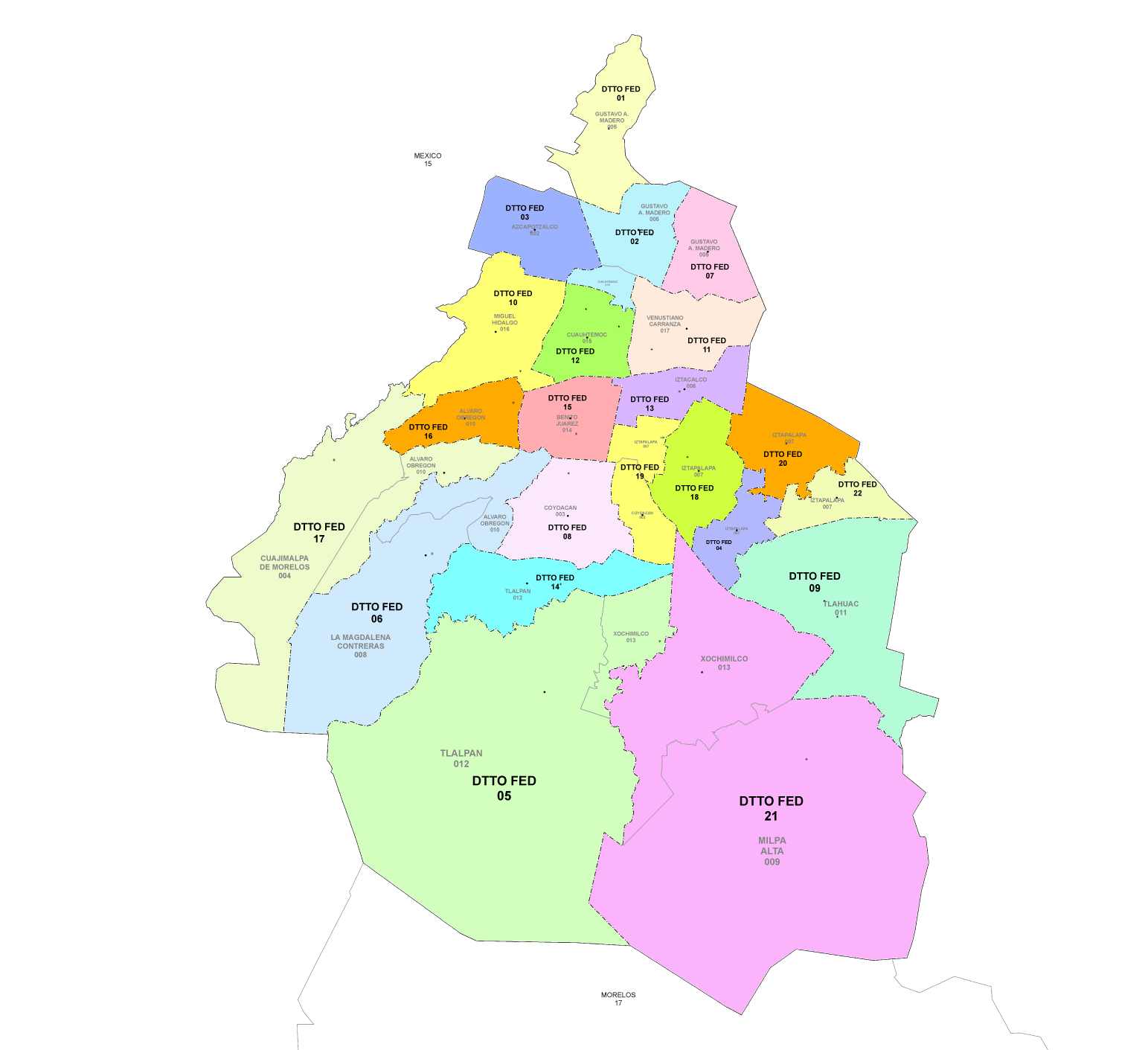
- 4th district since 2023

Incumbent
- Member: Dolores Padierna Luna
- Party: ▌Morena
- Congress: 66th (2024–2027)

District
- State: Mexico City
- Head town: Iztapalapa
- Coordinates: 19°21′30″N 99°05′35″W
- Covers: Iztapalapa (part)
- PR region: Fourth
- Precincts: 187
- Population: 374,674 (2020 census)

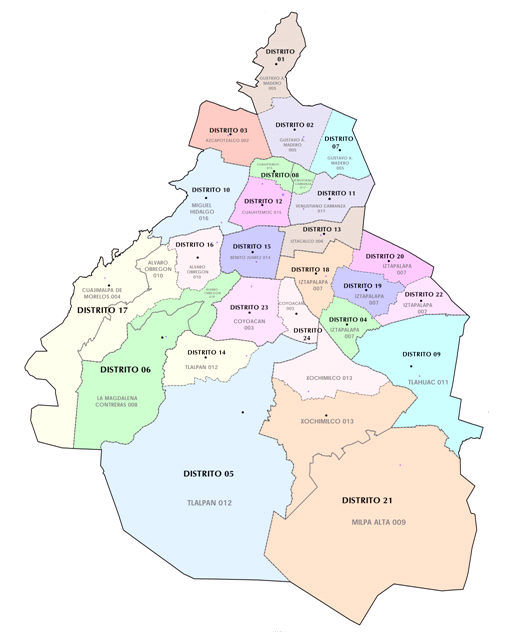
Mexico City under the 2017–2022 districting plan

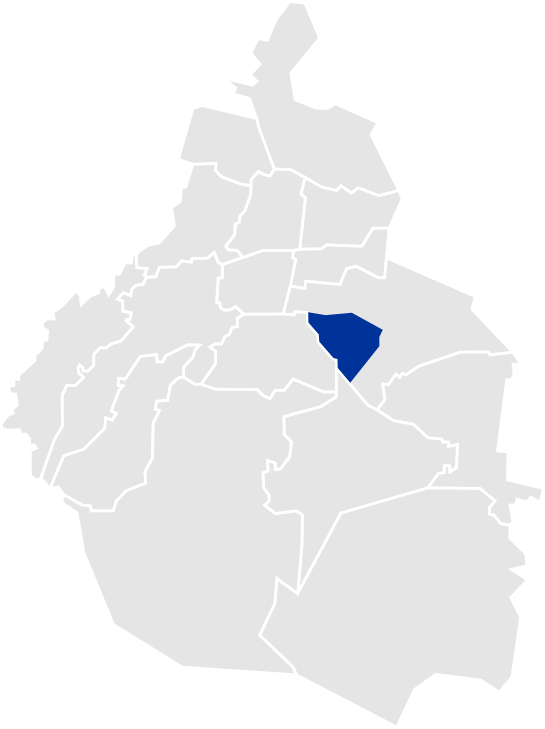
4th district in 2005–2017

The 4th federal electoral district of Mexico City (Spanish: Distrito electoral federal 04 de la Ciudad de México; previously "of the Federal District") is one of the 300 electoral districts into which Mexico is divided for elections to the federal Chamber of Deputies and one of 22 such districts in Mexico City.

It elects one deputy to the lower house of Congress for each three-year legislative session by means of the first-past-the-post system. Votes cast in the district also count towards the calculation of proportional representation ("plurinominal") deputies elected from the fourth region.

The current member for the district, elected in the 2024 general election, is Dolores Padierna of the National Regeneration Movement (Morena).

== District territory ==
Under the 2023 districting plan adopted by the National Electoral Institute (INE), which is to be used for the 2024, 2027 and 2030 federal elections, the 4th district covers 187 electoral precincts (secciones electorales) in central and southern portions of the borough (alcaldía) of Iztapalapa.

The district reported a population of 374,674 in the 2020 census.

== Previous districting schemes ==
Evolution of electoral district numbers
	1974	1978	1996	2005	2017	2023
Mexico City (Federal District)	27	40	30	27	24	22
Chamber of Deputies	196	300				

2017–2022

From 2017 to 2022, the district covered a south-western portion of Iztapalapa.

2005–2017

Under the 2005 districting scheme, the district covered a part of the south-west of Iztapalapa.

1996–2005

Between 1996 and 2005, the district covered the central portion of the borough of Gustavo A. Madero.

1978–1996

The districting scheme in force from 1978 to 1996 was the result of the 1977 electoral reforms, which increased the number of single-member seats in the Chamber of Deputies from 196 to 300. Under that plan, the Federal District's seat allocation rose from 27 to 40. The 4th district covered portions of the boroughs of Venustiano Carranza and Cuauhtémoc.

== Deputies returned to Congress ==
(Mexico) National parties
- Current
- PAN
- PRI
- PT
- PVEM
- MC
- Morena
- PAZ
- Somos
- Defunct or local only
- PLM
- PNR
- PRM
- PNM
- PP
- PPS
- PARM
- PFCRN
- CON
- PANAL
- PSD
- PES
- PES
- PRD

Mexico City's 4th district
Election	Deputy	Party	Term	Legislature
1916	Amador Lozano		1916–1917	Constituent Congress of Querétaro
1917	Jesús Urueta		1917–1918	27th Congress
1918	Paulino Fontes	PLN	1918–1920	28th Congress
1920	Vito Alessio Robles		1920–1922	29th Congress
1922	Rafael Pérez Taylor		1922–1924	30th Congress
1924	Gustavo Durón González		1924–1926	31st Congress
1926	Arturo Campillo Seyde		1926–1928	32nd Congress
1928	Rafael Cruz	PQ	1928–1930	33rd Congress
1930	José Morales Heesse	Institutional Revolutionary Party	1930–1932	34th Congress
1932	Ismael Salas	Institutional Revolutionary Party	1932–1934	35th Congress
1934	Antonio I. Villalobos	Institutional Revolutionary Party	1934–1937	36th Congress
1937	José Escudero Andrade	Institutional Revolutionary Party	1937–1940	37th Congress
1940	Alfonso Peña Palafox	Institutional Revolutionary Party	1940–1943	38th Congress
1943	Ruffo Figueroa Figueroa	Institutional Revolutionary Party	1943-1946	39th Congress
1946	Alfonso Martínez Domínguez	Institutional Revolutionary Party	1946-1949	40th Congress
1949	Francisco Fonseca García	Institutional Revolutionary Party	1949–1952	41st Congress
1952	Alberto Hernández Campos	Institutional Revolutionary Party	1952–1955	42nd Congress
1955	Salvador Carrillo Echeveste	Institutional Revolutionary Party	1955–1958	43rd Congress
1958	Ramón Villarreal Vázquez	Institutional Revolutionary Party	1958–1961	44th Congress
1961	Neftalí Mena Mena	Institutional Revolutionary Party	1961–1964	45th Congress
1964	Salvador Rodríguez Leija	Institutional Revolutionary Party	1964–1967	46th Congress
1967	Octavio Hernández González	Institutional Revolutionary Party	1967–1970	47th Congress
1970	Octavio Sentíes Gómez (Note: Sentíes Gómez resigned his seat on 14 June 1971 to take office as Head of the Department of the Federal District in the aftermath of the Corpus Christi massacre.); Carlos Hernández Márquez	Institutional Revolutionary Party	1970–1971; 1971–1973	48th Congress
1973	Efraín Garza Flores	Institutional Revolutionary Party	1973–1976	49th Congress
1976	Enrique Ramírez y Ramírez	Institutional Revolutionary Party	1976–1979	50th Congress
1979	Rodolfo Siller Rodríguez	Institutional Revolutionary Party	1979–1982	51st Congress
1982	Domingo Alapizco Jiménez	Institutional Revolutionary Party	1982–1985	52nd Congress
1985	Rafael López Zepeda	Institutional Revolutionary Party	1985–1988	53rd Congress
1988	Jesús Anlen López	Institutional Revolutionary Party	1988–1991	54th Congress
1991	Domingo Alapizco Jiménez	Institutional Revolutionary Party	1991–1994	55th Congress
1994	Juan José Osorio Palacios	Institutional Revolutionary Party	1994–1997	56th Congress
1997	José de Jesús Martín del Campo	Party of the Democratic Revolution	1997–2000	57th Congress
2000	José María Rivera Cabello	National Action Party (Mexico)	2000–2003	58th Congress
2003	Rocío Sánchez Pérez	Party of the Democratic Revolution	2003–2006	59th Congress
2006	Lourdes Alonso Flores	Party of the Democratic Revolution	2006–2009	60th Congress
2009	Jaime Cárdenas Gracia	Labour Party (Mexico)	2009–2012	61st Congress
2012	Carlos Augusto Morales López	Party of the Democratic Revolution	2012–2015	62nd Congress
2015	Ernestina Godoy Ramos	National Regeneration Movement	2015–2018	63rd Congress
2018	Gerardo Fernández Noroña	Labour Party (Mexico)	2018–2021	64th Congress
2021	Gerardo Fernández Noroña; Francisco Javier Guerrero Varela (Note: Alternate for Noroña after 20 June 2023.)	Labour Party (Mexico)	2021–2023	65th Congress
2024	Dolores Padierna Luna	National Regeneration Movement	2024–2027	66th Congress

== Presidential elections ==
Mexico City's 4th district
Election	District won by	Party or coalition	%
2018	Andrés Manuel López Obrador	Juntos Haremos Historia	65.2700
2024	Claudia Sheinbaum Pardo	Sigamos Haciendo Historia	69.6259
