= 8th federal electoral district of Mexico City =

Federal electoral district of Mexico

Mexico City's 8th
- Electoral district of the Chamber of Deputies of Mexico

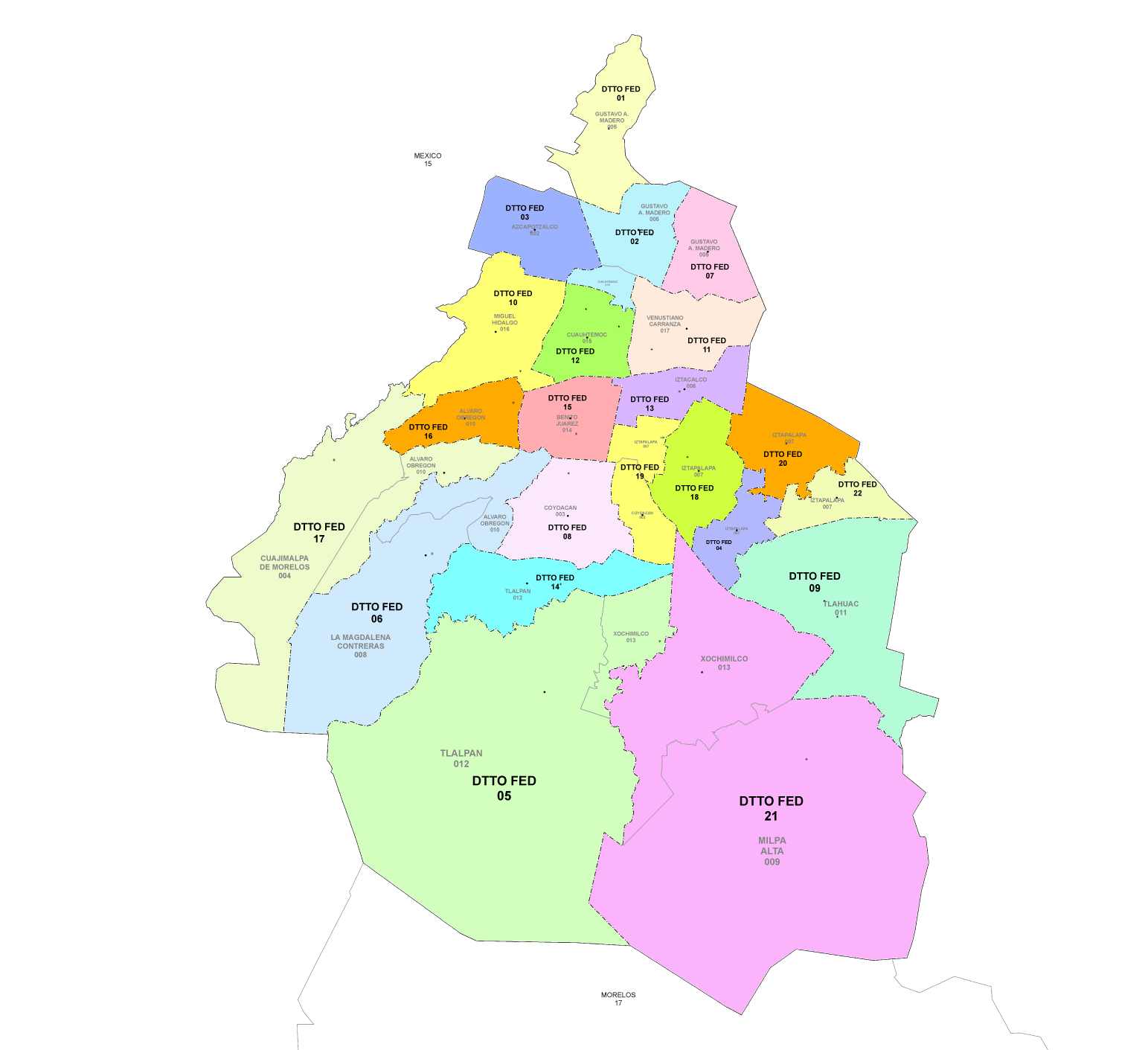
- 8th district since 2023

Incumbent
- Member: Ana María Lomelí
- Party: ▌Ecologist Green Party
- Congress: 66th (2024–2027)

District
- State: Mexico City
- Head town: Coyoacán
- Coordinates: 19°21′00″N 99°09′44″W
- Covers: Coyoacán (part)
- PR region: Fourth
- Precincts: 258
- Population: 400,753 (2020 census)

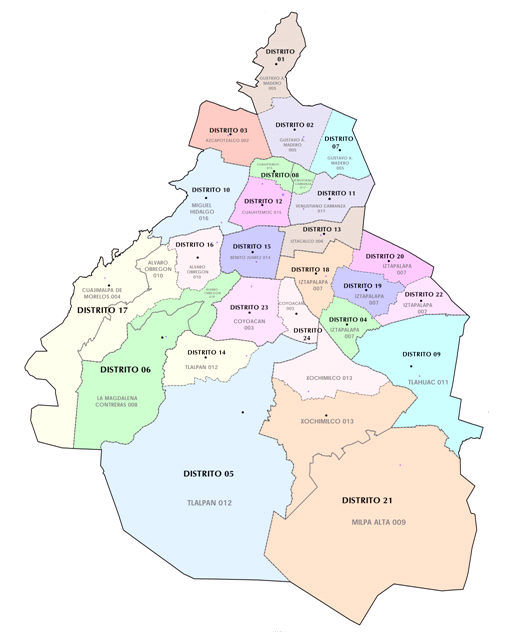
Mexico City under the 2017–2022 districting plan

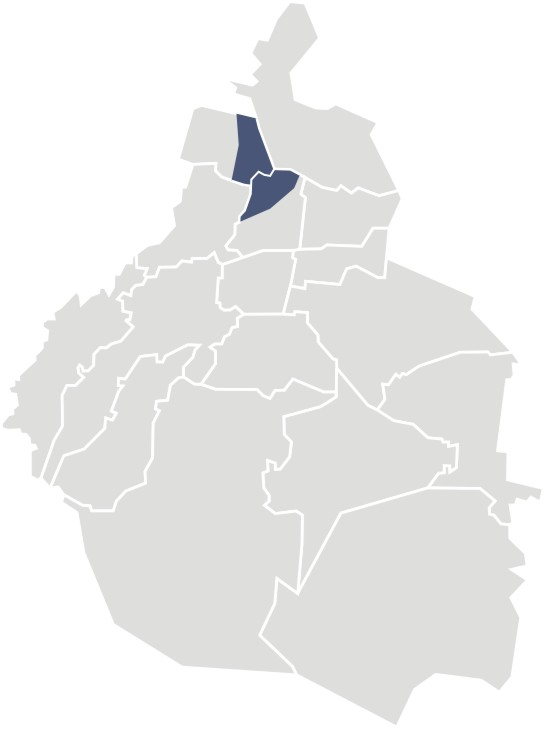
8th district in 2005–2017

The 8th federal electoral district of Mexico City (Spanish: Distrito electoral federal 08 de la Ciudad de México; previously "of the Federal District") is one of the 300 electoral districts into which Mexico is divided for elections to the federal Chamber of Deputies and one of 22 such districts in Mexico City.

It elects one deputy to the lower house of Congress for each three-year legislative session by means of the first-past-the-post system. Votes cast in the district also count towards the calculation of proportional representation ("plurinominal") deputies elected from the fourth region.

The current member for the district, elected in the 2024 general election, is Ana María Lomelí of the Ecologist Green Party of Mexico (PVEM).

== District territory ==
Under the 2023 districting plan adopted by the National Electoral Institute (INE), which is to be used for the 2024, 2027 and 2030 federal elections, the 8th district comprises 258 electoral precincts (secciones electorales) and covers most of the borough (alcaldía) of Coyoacán. (Note: The easternmost portion is assigned to the 19th district.)

The district reported a population of 400,753 in the 2020 census.

== Previous districting schemes ==
Evolution of electoral district numbers
	1974	1978	1996	2005	2017	2023
Mexico City (Federal District)	27	40	30	27	24	22
Chamber of Deputies	196	300				

2017–2022

From 2017 to 2022, the district comprised portions of the boroughs of Cuauhtémoc and Venustiano Carranza.

2005–2017

Under the 2005 districting scheme, the district covered the borough (delegación) of Cuauhtémoc to the north and west of Paseo de la Reforma and the Calzada de Guadalupe, and the eastern section of the borough of Azcapotzalco.

1996–2005

Between 1996 and 2005, the district covered the northern portion of Cuauhtémoc only.

1978–1996

The districting scheme in force from 1978 to 1996 was the result of the 1977 electoral reforms, which increased the number of single-member seats in the Chamber of Deputies from 196 to 300. Under that plan, the Federal District's seat allocation rose from 27 to 40. The 8th district covered portions of the boroughs of Miguel Hidalgo and Álvaro Obregón.

== Deputies returned to Congress ==
(Mexico) National parties
- Current
- PAN
- PRI
- PT
- PVEM
- MC
- Morena
- PAZ
- Somos
- Defunct or local only
- PLM
- PNR
- PRM
- PNM
- PP
- PPS
- PARM
- PFCRN
- CON
- PANAL
- PSD
- PES
- PES
- PRD

Mexico City's 8th district
Election	Deputy	Party	Term	Legislature
1916	Arnulfo Silva		1916–1917	Constituent Congress of Querétaro
1917	Jesús Acuña		1917–1918	27th Congress
1918	Mariano Urdanivia	PLN	1918–1920	28th Congress
1920	Rafael Lara G.		1920–1922	29th Congress
1922	Roque González Garza		1922–1924	30th Congress
1924	Romeo Ortega		1924–1926	31st Congress
1926	Gonzalo N. Santos		1926–1928	32nd Congress
1928	Adalberto Encinas	PO	1928–1930	33rd Congress
1930	Tiburcio G. Altamirano	Institutional Revolutionary Party	1930–1932	34th Congress
1932	José María Dávila	Institutional Revolutionary Party	1932–1934	35th Congress
1934	Carlos A. Calderón	Institutional Revolutionary Party	1934–1937	36th Congress
1937	Luis S. Campa	Institutional Revolutionary Party	1937–1940	37th Congress
1940	Luis Quintero Gutiérrez	Institutional Revolutionary Party	1940–1943	38th Congress
1943	Jesús Yurén Aguilar	Institutional Revolutionary Party	1943–1946	39th Congress
1946	Fernando Amilpa	Institutional Revolutionary Party	1946–1949	40th Congress
1949	Alfonso Sánchez Madariaga	Institutional Revolutionary Party	1949–1952	41st Congress
1952	Rómulo Sánchez Mireles	Institutional Revolutionary Party	1952–1955	42nd Congress
1955	José Gutiérrez Díaz	Institutional Revolutionary Party	1955–1958	43rd Congress
1958	Emilio Gandarilla Avilés	Institutional Revolutionary Party	1958–1961	44th Congress
1961	Javier González Gómez	Institutional Revolutionary Party	1961–1964	45th Congress
1964	Manuel Origel Salazar	Institutional Revolutionary Party	1964–1967	46th Congress
1967	Efraín González Morfín	National Action Party (Mexico)	1967–1970	47th Congress
1970	Manuel Origel Salazar	Institutional Revolutionary Party	1970–1973	48th Congress
1973	Carlos Dufoo López	Institutional Revolutionary Party	1973–1976	49th Congress
1976	Julio César Mena Brito Andrade	Institutional Revolutionary Party	1976–1979	50th Congress
1979	Lidia Camarena Adame	Institutional Revolutionary Party	1979–1982	51st Congress
1982	Juan Saldaña Rosell	Institutional Revolutionary Party	1982–1985	52nd Congress
1985	Adrián Mora Aguilar	Institutional Revolutionary Party	1985–1988	53rd Congress
1988	Ignacio López Tarso	Institutional Revolutionary Party	1988–1991	54th Congress
1991	Fernando Lerdo de Tejada Luna	Institutional Revolutionary Party	1991–1994	55th Congress
1994	Jesús Rodríguez y Rodríguez	Institutional Revolutionary Party	1994–1997	56th Congress
1997	Dolores Padierna	Party of the Democratic Revolution	1997–2000	57th Congress
2000	Mauro Huerta Díaz	National Action Party (Mexico)	2000–2003	58th Congress
2003	Dolores Padierna	Party of the Democratic Revolution	2003–2006	59th Congress
2006	Armando Barreiro Pérez	Party of the Democratic Revolution	2006–2009	60th Congress
2009	Vidal Llerenas Morales	Party of the Democratic Revolution	2009–2012	61st Congress
2012	Alejandro Carbajal González	Party of the Democratic Revolution	2012–2015	62nd Congress
2015	Vidal Llerenas Morales; Jorge Ramírez Rosete	National Regeneration Movement	2015–2018; 2018	63rd Congress
2018	María Rosete Sánchez	Labour Party (Mexico)	2018–2021	64th Congress
2021	María Rosete Sánchez	Labour Party (Mexico)	2021–2024	65th Congress
2024	Ana María Lomelí	Ecologist Green Party of Mexico	2024–2027	66th Congress

== Presidential elections ==
Mexico City's 8th district
Election	District won by	Party or coalition	%
2018	Andrés Manuel López Obrador	Juntos Haremos Historia	57.7853
2024	Claudia Sheinbaum Pardo	Sigamos Haciendo Historia	50.0462
