= Alfonso Suárez =

Alfonso Suárez can refer to:

- Alfonso Suárez Obiol (1924–1988), Chilean politician
- Alfonso Suárez Rizzo (born 1913), Ecuadorian footballer

== See also ==
- José Alfonso Suárez del Real (born 1953), Mexican journalist and politician
