= Manuel Ávila Camacho =

President of Mexico from 1940 to 1946

- Ávila in 1943

52nd President of Mexico
- In office 1 December 1940 – 30 November 1946
- Preceded by: Lázaro Cárdenas
- Succeeded by: Miguel Alemán Valdés

Secretary of National Defense of Mexico
- In office 18 October 1936 – 31 January 1939
- President: Lázaro Cárdenas
- Preceded by: Andrés Figueroa
- Succeeded by: Jesús Agustín Castro

Personal details
- Born: 24 April 1897 Teziutlán, Puebla, Mexico
- Died: 13 October 1955 (aged 58) Huixquilucan, State of Mexico, Mexico
- Resting place: Panteón Francés
- Party: Institutional Revolutionary Party
- Spouse: Soledad Orozco (m. 1925)
- Occupation: Military officer; politician
- Awards: Order of the White Eagle; Order of the Sun; Order of Merit; Order of Propitious Clouds; Order of the Sword
- Nickname: El Presidente Caballero

Military service
- Allegiance: Mexico
- Branch/service: Constitutionalist Army (1914–1920); Mexican Army (1920–1939)
- Years of service: 1914–1939
- Rank: Division general
- Battles/wars: Mexican Revolution; Delahuertista Rebellion; Yaqui Wars; Cristero War; Escobar Rebellion; Cedillo Rebellion

Manuel Ávila Camacho (Spanish pronunciation: [maˈnwel ˈaβila kaˈmatʃo]; 24 April 1897 – 13 October 1955) was a Mexican general and politician who served as the president of Mexico from 1940 to 1946. A participant in the Mexican Revolution, he rose to high rank, and served as chief of staff to his predecessor Lázaro Cárdenas. Known as “El Presidente Caballero” (“The Gentleman President”), his administration marked the transition from military to civilian leadership, moderated the radicalism of the Cárdenas era, ended open anticlericalism, reversed socialist education policies, and aligned Mexico with the Allies during World War II.

== Early life ==
Manuel Ávila Camacho was born in Teziutlán, a small but economically important town in Puebla, to middle-class parents, Manuel Ávila Castillo and Eufrosina Camacho Bello. He studied accounting at the Liceo Teziuteco in his hometown and later attended the National Preparatory School, but did not complete a university degree.. His older brother Maximino Ávila Camacho was a more dominant and controversial figure; another brother, Rafael, also held public office.

== Military career and entry into politics ==
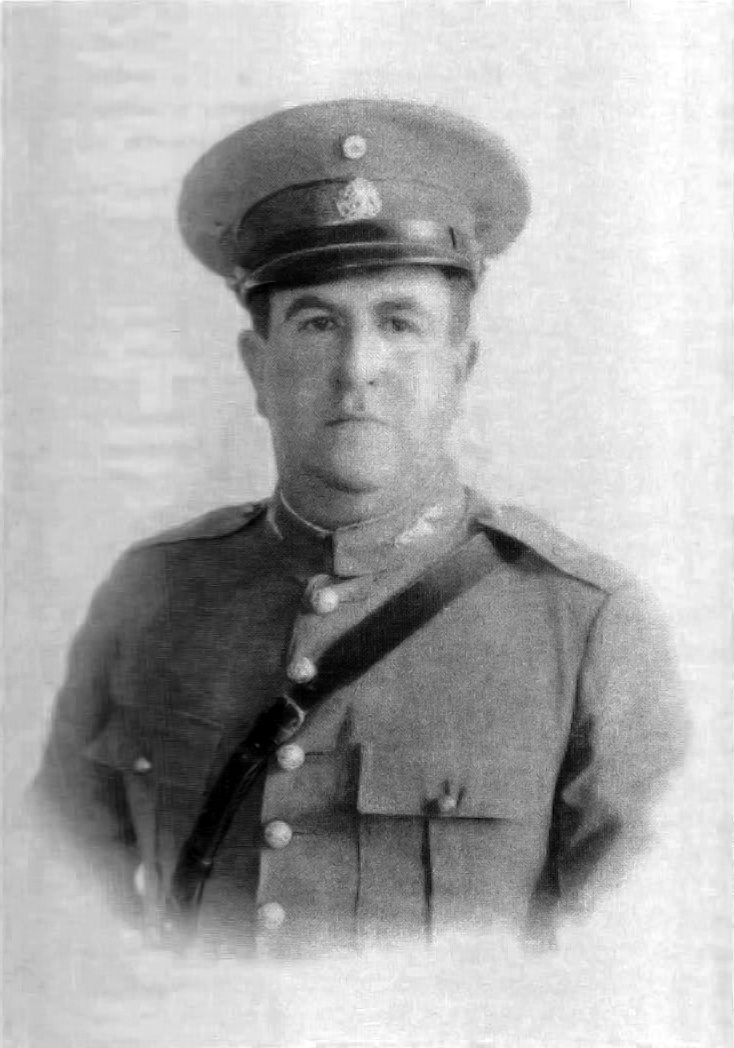
General Manuel Ávila Camacho

Ávila Camacho joined the Constitutionalist army in 1914 as a second lieutenant in the Brigada Aquiles Serdán under Colonel Antonio Medina. In early 1915 he participated in the re-taking of Puebla and Mexico City from the Conventionist-aligned Zapatistas and was promoted to lieutenant.

Around 1918–1920, serving as chief of staff of the 1ª Brigada Sonora under Lázaro Cárdenas, he took part in actions against the forces of Manuel Peláez in the Papantla region of Veracruz. On Cárdenas' recommendation he was promoted to colonel in June 1920. Shortly afterward, in Sonora, he participated in the pacification campaign against the Yaqui people as chief of staff of an expeditionary force.

He continued serving under Cárdenas in Michoacán and during the Delahuertista rebellion he helped defend Morelia against the attack led by Rafael Buelna and was promoted to general brigadier. He continued operations against the rebels in Guanajuato and later commanded a sector in Jalisco. While stationed in Jalisco he met Soledad Orozco García, from a prominent family in Zapopan. They married on 16 December 1925 in Sayula; the couple had no children.

During the Cristero War he campaigned against the rebels in the Bajío, Colima, and Jalisco, generally preferring amnesties and local accommodations. In 1929 he fought under Cárdenas against the Escobar Rebellion in the Sonora–Sinaloa campaign and was promoted to general de brigada.

In December 1934, when Cárdenas assumed the presidency, Ávila Camacho was appointed Oficial Mayor of the Secretary of War and Navy. He became Subsecretary in June 1935, assumed charge of the secretariat after the death of Andrés Figueroa, and was formally named Secretary in January 1937. During his tenure he handled residual violence in Tabasco stemming from the collapse of Tomás Garrido Canabal’s radical regime and its paramilitary Camisas Rojas, directed the suppression of the Saturnino Cedillo rebellion in San Luis Potosí, and oversaw the renaming of the secretariat to the Secretariat of National Defense. Cárdenas promoted him to general de división on 14 January 1939; he resigned days later to seek the presidential nomination.

== 1940 presidential election ==
He was selected by Cárdenas as the Party of the Mexican Revolution (PRM) official candidate over the more radical Francisco J. Múgica, a choice intended to reduce the risk of a military or right-wing revolt. His principal opponent was General Juan Andreu Almazán of the Revolutionary Party of National Unification (PRUN).

The election was marked by widespread violence. Contemporary reports documented dozens of deaths and hundreds of injuries, particularly in Mexico City, where Almazán supporters attempting to protest at the National Palace were fired upon by government-aligned forces. Official results credited Ávila Camacho with 2,476,641 votes (93.9 percent) against Almazán’s 151,101 (5.7 percent). Almazán refused to recognize the outcome, alleging ballot-box stuffing, denial of credentials to his supporters, and organized violence; he later sought unsuccessfully for U.S. support.

Historian Lorenzo Meyer has noted that the scale of the official landslide was incompatible with the political reality of the moment and the size of Almazán’s urban demonstrations. Subsequent Mexican historiography has generally concluded that the election involved substantial fraud and manipulation by the PRM under Cárdenas, although the precise extent remains debated.

== Presidency (1940–1946) ==
WW2-era propaganda poster: "We defend Liberty and fight for a better world," with portraits of Mexican historical leaders: Miguel Hidalgo y Costilla, Benito Juárez, Francisco I. Madero and Ávila Camacho.

=== Church and state ===
A self-described Catholic, Ávila Camacho publicly stated “I am a believer,” marking a clear break with the anticlericalism of his predecessors. Open confrontation between the state and the Catholic Church in Mexico largely ended during his term.

=== Domestic policy ===
Ávila Camacho pursued policies of national unity and moderation. He created the Mexican Social Security Institute (IMSS) in 1943. Land reform continued but at a markedly slower pace than under Cárdenas; distribution of ejidos was reduced and larger landowners received greater benefits through irrigation and other projects.

In education he repealed the constitutional amendments mandating socialist education. In December 1943 the government sponsored the creation of the National Union of Education Workers (SNTE) as a single national teachers’ union, consolidating state influence over the education sector. Within the labor movement he facilitated the replacement of Vicente Lombardo Toledano by Fidel Velázquez at the head of the Confederation of Mexican Workers (CTM), strengthening official control.

In 1946 he enacted a new electoral law that raised barriers for opposition parties. The law established the following criteria that had to be fulfilled by any political organization to be recognized as a political party.

- have at least 10,000 active members in 10 states;
- exist for at least three years before elections;
- agree with the principles established in the constitution;
- not form alliances or be subordinated to international organizations or foreign political parties.

On 18 January 1946, he had the Party of the Mexican Revolution (PRM) renamed to the Institutional Revolutionary Party (PRI), its current name. The Mexican army had been a sector of the PRM, but it was eliminated from the organization of the PRI. Economically, he pursued the country's industrialization, which benefited only a small group, and income inequality increased. In agriculture, his administration invited the Rockefeller Foundation to introduce Green Revolution technology to bolster Mexico's agricultural productivity.

=== World War II and foreign policy ===
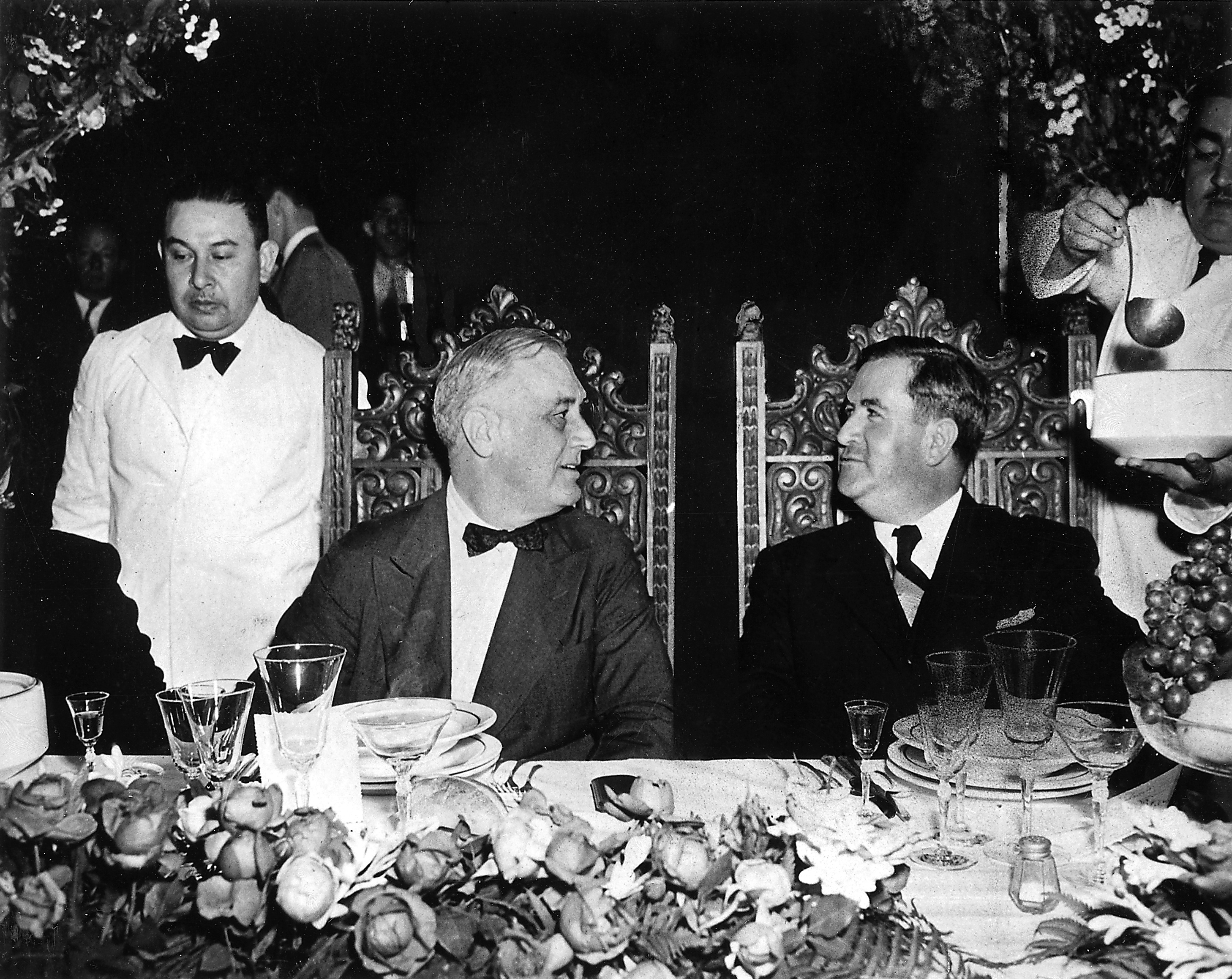
Manuel Ávila Camacho, in Monterrey, having dinner with US President Franklin Roosevelt.

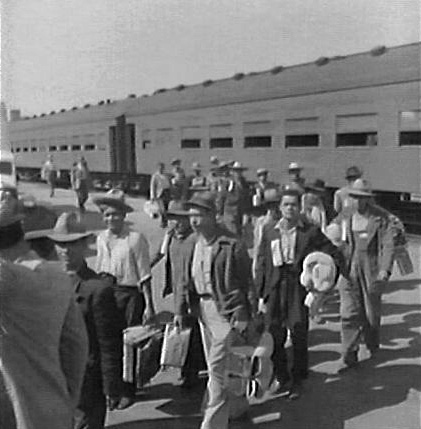
The first braceros arriving in Los Angeles, California by train in 1942. Photograph by Dorothea Lange.

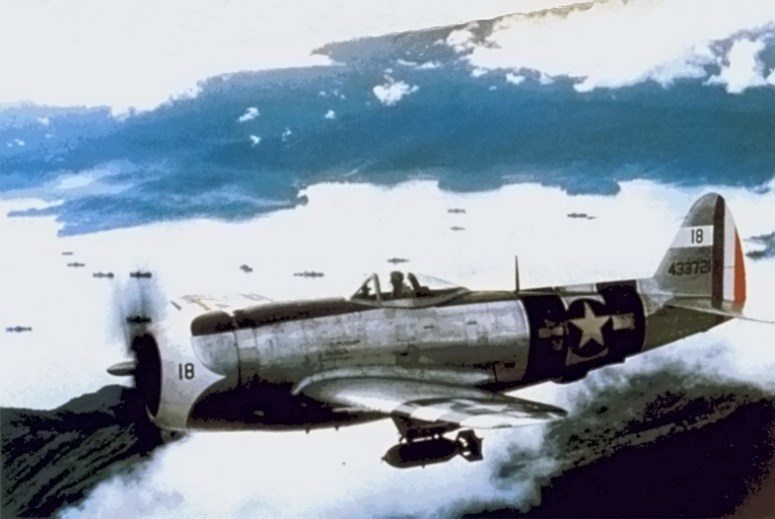
Mexico provided military support for the Allies in World War II, with air Squadron 201

After German submarines sank the Mexican tankers Potrero del Llano and Faja de Oro, Ávila Camacho declared a state of war against the Axis powers on 22 May 1942. Additional Mexican vessels were later sunk in the Gulf of Mexico and the Caribbean, prompting coastal patrols and convoy escort duties by the Mexican Navy in those waters.

To consolidate national unity behind the war effort, on 15 September 1942 he convened a National Reconciliation Assembly that brought together the six living former presidents, Adolfo de la Huerta, Plutarco Elías Calles, Emilio Portes Gil, Pascual Ortiz Rubio, Abelardo L. Rodríguez, and Lázaro Cárdenas alongside the current president for the Independence Day celebrations. In April 1943 he met President Franklin D. Roosevelt in Monterrey and Corpus Christi, further strengthening wartime cooperation between the two countries.

Mexican war participation was limited but symbolically important. The Escuadrón 201 (201st Fighter Squadron) consisting of 300 men, trained in the United States and flew combat missions in the Battle of Luzon in 1945; five Mexican airmen died in action. The squadron was credited with putting approximately 30,000 Japanese troops out of action and its performance was praised by General Douglas MacArthur. Mexico also supplied strategic materials, especially oil, which was vital to the Allied war effort, and sent approximately 300,000 agricultural workers to the United States under the Bracero Program.

Mexico's joining the conflict on the side of the Allies dramatically improved foreign relations particularly with the United States and the United Kingdom. Outstanding disputes, including compensation for the 1938 oil expropriation, were settled, facilitating increased Mexican oil exports to the Allies; Mexico received aid for railways and the Pan-American Highway and reduced its external debt. The restoration of diplomatic relations with the United Kingdom, broken since the 1938 oil expropriation, was driven directly by Britain’s wartime need for Mexican oil. Relations with the Soviet Union, broken in 1930, were re-established in 1942–1943. Moreover, the war stimulated Mexican industry, which grew by approximately 10% annually between 1940 and 1945. Mexico signed the United Nations Charter in 1945 and hosted the Inter-American Conference on Problems of War and Peace at Chapultepec Castle from 21 February to 8 March 1945.

During and after the war years he received several foreign decorations, including the Grand Cross of the Order of the White Eagle from the Polish government-in-exile, the Grand Cross of the Order of the Sun of Peru, the Collar of the Order of Merit of Chile, and the Special Grand Cordon of the Order of Propitious Clouds from the Republic of China; he was also authorized by Congress to accept the Commander grade of the Swedish Order of the Sword and Cuba’s Distinguished Service Medal.

=== Brother Maximino and accusations of nepotism ===
Ávila Camacho’s older brother Maximino Ávila Camacho remained a major political liability throughout the presidency. A division general and longtime caudillo of Puebla, he served as governor of the state from 1937 to 1941, exercising near-total control over the military zone, state finances, communications, and local political networks. In September 1941 Manuel appointed him Secretary of Communications and Public Works, a post he held until his death.

Maximino’s methods stood in sharp contrast to his brother’s. Contemporary and later accounts describe him as ruthless, temperamental, and openly corrupt; he amassed a large personal fortune through landholdings, business alliances, including with U.S. businessman William O. Jenkins, and the use of public office. He frequently embarrassed the administration through personal scandals and public statements, including his open assertion that he had a right to succeed his brother as president. His presence reinforced perceptions of nepotism and limited Manuel’s ability to distance the government from the practices of earlier revolutionary generals. Maximino died of a heart attack on 17 February 1945, before the official party’s presidential nomination process, removing a potential obstacle to the selection of Miguel Alemán.

=== Assassination attempt ===
On 10 April 1944, as Ávila Camacho crossed the courtyard of the National Palace toward his private elevator, he was approached by Lieutenant José Antonio de la Lama y Rojas, a 31- or 32-year-old artillery officer from Puebla. De la Lama greeted the president and then fired a .45-caliber pistol at him at close range.

Ávila Camacho, who was wearing a bulletproof vest, was only grazed. He immediately seized the attacker’s wrist and disarmed him. When questioned, De la Lama stated that he had acted because military personnel were not allowed to enter churches or lodges in uniform, declaring that there was “no liberty or justice” in the country. Contemporary Mexican accounts and later historiography have identified him as linked to the National Synarchist Union. At the same time, government spokesmen and some contemporary press reports described him as a Nazi sympathizer and claimed that documents of Nazi origin had been found in his possession.

Official reports stated that later the same day, while held at the barracks of the 6th Cavalry Regiment, De la Lama attempted to escape and was shot. He died on 12 April 1944 from peritonitis resulting from the wounds. The incident was the last known assassination attempt against a sitting president of Mexico.

=== Official international trips ===
This is a list of official trips abroad made by Ávila Camacho during his presidency.

According to Article 88 of the Constitution of Mexico, the president may leave the country for up to seven days by informing the Senate or, where applicable, the Permanent Commission in advance of the reasons for the absence, as well as of the results of the measures carried out. For absences longer than seven days, permission from the Senate or the Permanent Commission is required.

Date	Destination	Main purpose
1943
21 April	Corpus Christi (United States)	Meeting with President of the United States Franklin D. Roosevelt to reciprocate the courtesy of the summit meeting held the previous day in Monterrey.

== Later life ==
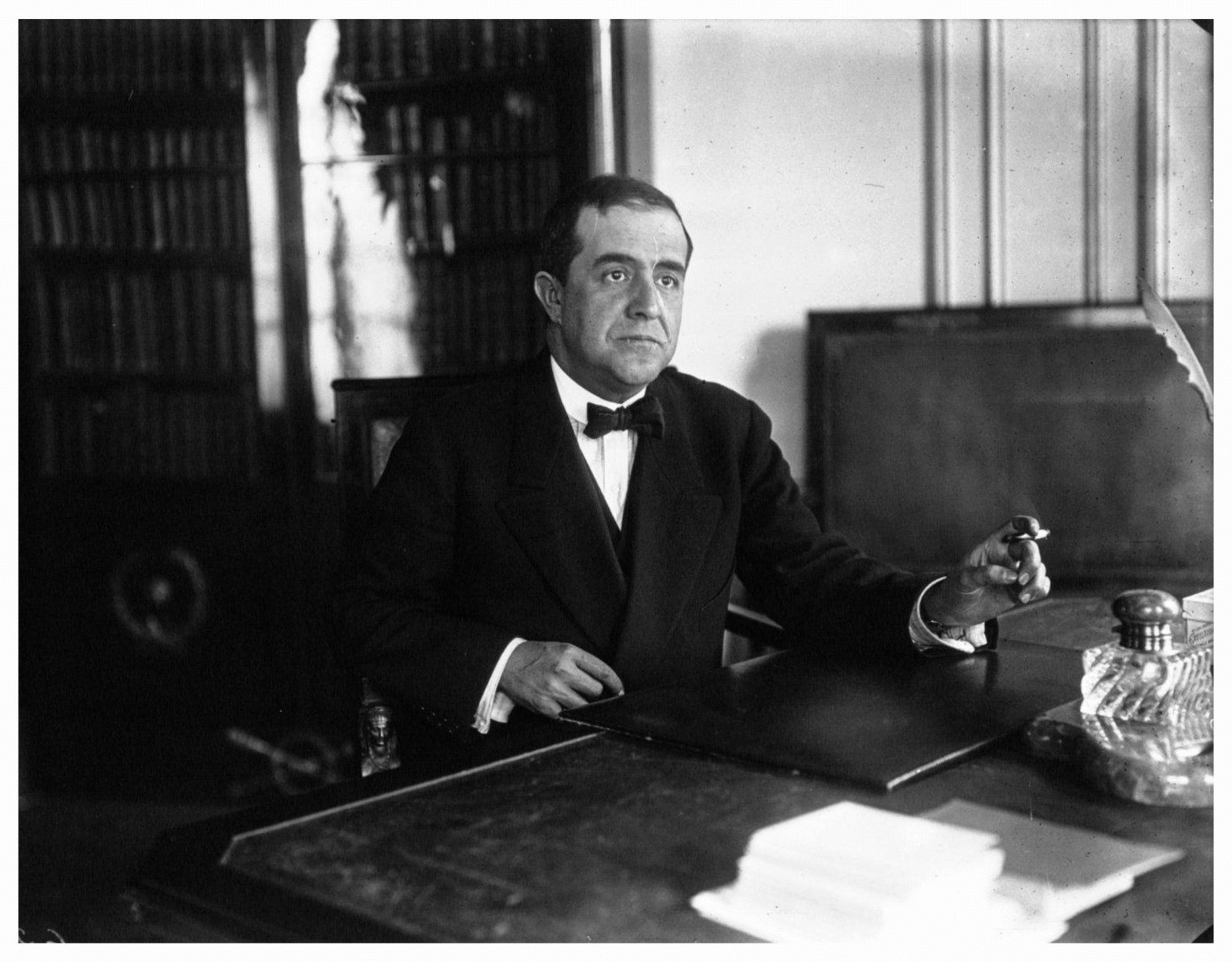
Ávila Camacho in the 1950s

When his term ended in 1946, Ávila Camacho retired to work on his farm.

In 1951, President Miguel Alemán Valdés, nearing the end of his six-year term, expressed his desire to have the Constitution amended to allow him to be re-elected. Ávila Camacho and Cárdenas had former president Abelardo L. Rodríguez give a statement that they didn't "think extension of the presidential term or re-election is convenient for the country." This allowed for the transfer of power to President Adolfo Ruiz Cortines in 1952.

Ávila Camacho died at his farm of a heart ailment on 13 October 1955, aged 58.

== Legacy ==
Ávila Camacho’s presidency is widely regarded as the definitive transition from the radical phase of the Mexican Revolution to the more moderate, civilian-dominated PRI system that dominated Mexican politics for the next several decades. His moderation of anticlericalism, reversal of socialist education, and creation of the IMSS laid foundations for social stability, while wartime industrial growth began the period later known as the “Mexican Miracle.” At the same time, his administration consolidated the institutional mechanisms of one-party dominance, including tighter control of labor and peasant organizations and restrictive electoral rules, and was accompanied by rising inequality and accusations of nepotism centered on his brother Maximino.

Numerous places and institutions across Mexico bear his name, including major avenues and boulevards in Mexico City, Puebla, Xalapa, Veracruz, and other cities, as well as colonias, schools, and public buildings.

== See also ==
- List of heads of state of Mexico

Political offices
Preceded by Andrés Figueroa	Secretary of National Defense of Mexico; 1936–1939	Succeeded by Jesús Agustín Castro
Preceded by Lázaro Cárdenas	President of Mexico; 1940–1946	Succeeded by Miguel Alemán Valdés
Party political offices
Preceded by Lázaro Cárdenas	PRI nominee for President of Mexico; 1940	Succeeded by Miguel Alemán Valdés
