= Agustin Guerrero =

Agustin Guerrero may refer to:

- Agustín Guerrero Lizarzaburu (1819–1902), member of the 1883 provisional government of Ecuador
- Agustín Guerrero Castillo (born 1959), Mexican politician and journalist
- Agustin Guerrero (comics), fictional character and comic book superhero
