= Vidal Llerenas Morales =

Mexican politician

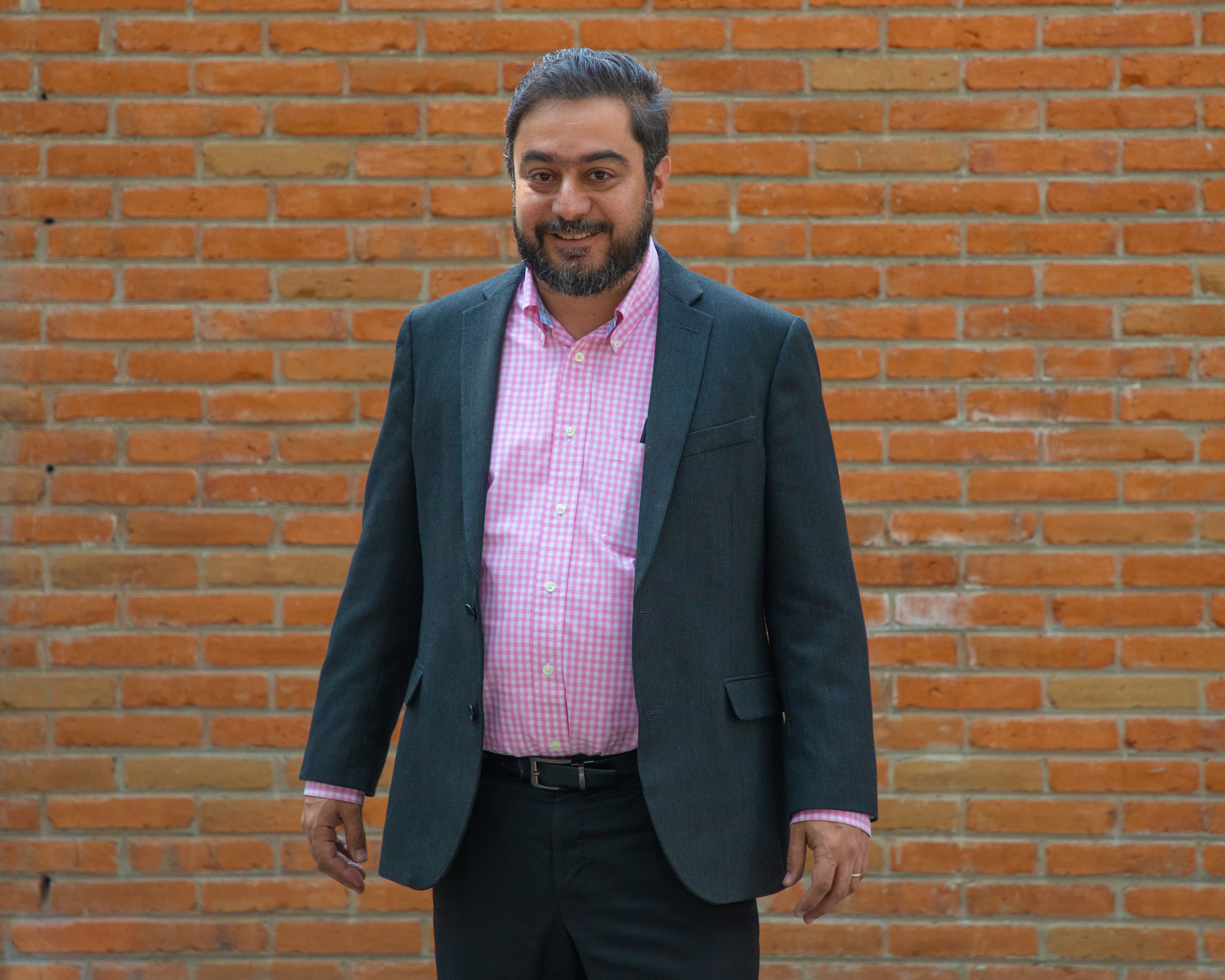
- Born: 2 February 1972 (age 54); Mexico City, Mexico
- Occupation: Politician
- Political party: PRD (1990s–2015); MORENA (2015–present)

Vidal Llerenas Morales (born 2 February 1972) is a Mexican politician from the National Regeneration Movement (Morena). He represented Mexico City's eighth district in the Chamber of Deputies during the 61st Congress (2009–2012), representing the Party of the Democratic Revolution, and, again, during the 63rd Congress (2015–2018), representing Morena.

== Life ==
Llerenas Morales graduated with an undergraduate degree in economics from the Instituto Tecnológico Autónomo de México in 1994. After brief stints as an advisor to the Deputy Secretary of Public Security and a director of Nafinsa, and save for a two-year span between 1998 and 2000 in which he served as an advisor to a budget committee in the Chamber of Deputies, Llerenas spent most of the next seven years as a graduate student in the United Kingdom, picking up a master's degree in politics and public management from the University of Essex in 1998, as well as a doctorate in public administration from the University of York in 2004.

Upon his return to Mexico, Llerenas served as a social comptroller for states and municipalities in the Secretariat of the Civil Service (SFP) from 2004 to 2006, and then as the deputy secretary of expenditures for the Federal District between 2006 and 2009.

2009 saw Llerenas be elected to the Chamber of Deputies for the first time, as a PRD deputy for the Federal District's 8th electoral district in the 61st Congress. He primarily served on financial and accounting-related commissions, including Finances and Public Credit, Budget and Public Accounts, Center for the Study of Public Finances, Economy, Government, Federal District, Special on Competitiveness, and Special for Analysis of Fiscal Expenditures. During this time, Llerenas spent two years as the vice president of the National College of Economists. When his first term in San Lázaro ended, voters sent him to the Legislative Assembly of the Federal District for a three-year term. He presided over the Special Commission for Legislative Studies and served on a myriad of commissions, largely related to budgets and finance. He also presented initiatives supporting the legalization of marijuana.

In 2014, he wrote a book, Progressive Perspectives: Ideas for a Progressive Fiscal Reform.

On 21 February 2015, Llerenas resigned from the PRD, believing that a candidacy for federal deputy under the PRD banner would not be competitive and criticizing the party for not taking into account the political tenure or relationships of potential candidates. Instead, he ran as a candidate for Morena; the PRD promptly claimed that Llerenas was offering food vouchers for votes during a ban on electoral activities. Llerenas won the June 2015 election for the eighth district; much like in the 61st Congress, he serves on mostly financial commissions, including Budget and Public Accounts, Committee for the Center for the Study of Public Finances, Economy, and Finances and Public Credit.
