= Rocío Sánchez Pérez =

Mexican politician

Member of the Chamber of Deputies for the Federal District′s 4th district
- In office 1 September 2003 – 31 August 2006
- Preceded by: José María Rivera Cabello
- Succeeded by: Lourdes Alonso Flores

Personal details
- Born: 18 October 1961 (age 64) Mexico City, Mexico
- Party: PRD
- Occupation: Politician

Rocío Sánchez Pérez (born 18 October 1961) is a Mexican politician affiliated with the Party of the Democratic Revolution. In 2003–2006, she served as a federal deputy in the 59th Congress, representing the Federal District's fourth district.
