= Gabriela Sodi Miranda =

Mexican politician (born 1959)

Deputy of the Congress of the Union for Mexico City's 12th district
- In office 1 September 2021 – 31 August 2024
- Preceded by: Montserrat Navarro Pérez
- Succeeded by: Mónica Sandoval Hernández

Personal details
- Born: Ana Cecilia Luisa Gabriela Fernanda Sodi Miranda; 6 May 1959 (age 67) Mexico City, Mexico
- Relatives: Sodi family
- Education: Instituto de Cultura Superior

Gabriela Sodi Miranda (born 6 May 1959) is a Mexican art historian and politician affiliated with the Party of the Democratic Revolution (PRD). From 1 September 2021 to 31 August 2024, she was a federal deputy for the 12th district of Mexico City in the LXV Legislature of the Congress of the Union.

== Early years ==
Ana Cecilia Luisa Gabriela Fernanda Sodi Miranda was born on 6 May 1959 in Mexico City. She is the daughter of Ernesto Sodi Pallares and Yolanda Miranda Mange. She is the sister of the singer Thalía, historian Ernestina, and archeologist Federica Sodi Miranda. She is also the sister of actress Laura Zapata through her mother's side.

Sodi studied art history at the Instituto de Cultura Superior.

== Political career ==
From 2000 to 2003 she was a substitute federal deputy for the Institutional Revolutionary Party (PRI), without actually holding the seat. In 2002 she was a national political advisor for the PRI. In the 2003 Morelos state elections, she was included by the party in its list of multi-member deputies for the Morelos State Congress.

In the 2018 Mexico City elections, she was nominated by the Humanist Party of Mexico City as a deputy of the Mexico City Congress for the city's 13th district.

In the 2021 federal elections, she was nominated by the Party of the Democratic Revolution (PRD) as a federal deputy for Mexico City's 12th district. On 1 September 2021, she took the seat in the LXV Legislature. During her term in Congress, she served as president of the commission for attention to vulnerable groups.
