= Alejandro Carbajal González =

Mexican politician

- Born: 23 March 1972 (age 54); Álvaro Obregón, Federal District, Mexico
- Occupation: Deputy
- Political party: PRD

Alejandro Carbajal González (born 23 March 1972) is a Mexican politician affiliated with the Party of the Democratic Revolution (PRD). In 2012–2015 he served as a federal deputy in the 62nd Congress, representing the Federal District's eighth district for the PRD.
