= Francisco Javier Saucedo =

Mexican politician (born 1955)

- Born: 24 April 1955 (age 71); Guadalajara, Jalisco, Mexico
- Occupation: Politician
- Political party: PRD

Francisco Javier Saucedo Pérez (born 24 April 1955) is a Mexican politician affiliated with the Party of the Democratic Revolution (PRD). In 2003–2006 he served as a federal deputy in the 59th Congress, representing the Federal District's twelfth district for the PRD.
