= José Luis Muñoz Soria =

Mexican politician (born 1948)

- Born: 10 August 1948; Pénjamo, Guanajuato, Mexico
- Died: 23 April 2024 (aged 75)
- Education: IPN
- Occupation: Politician
- Political party: PRD

José Luis Muñoz Soria (10 August 1948 – 23 April 2024) was a Mexican politician affiliated with the Party of the Democratic Revolution (PRD).

Muñoz Soria was born in Pénjamo, Guanajuato, in 1948. He was the borough chief of Cuauhtémoc, Mexico City, from 2006 to 2009, and he was later elected to the fifth session of the Legislative Assembly of the Federal District (2009–2012).

In the 2012 general election he was elected to the Chamber of Deputies for the 62nd Congress (2012–2015), representing the Federal District's twelfth district.

Muñoz Soria died on 23 April 2024. The Chamber of Deputies observed a minute's silence in his honour.
