= Francisco José Múgica =

Mexican politician (1884–1954)

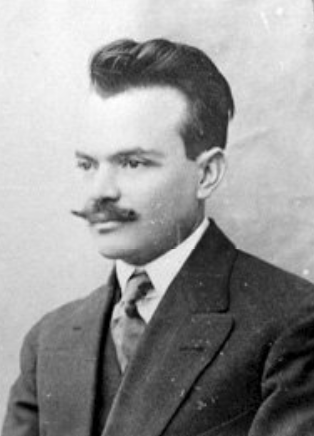
Francisco José Múgica

Francisco José Múgica Velázquez (3 September 1884 – 12 April 1954) was a Mexican military revolutionary, major general and politician. He participated in the Constituent Congress of 1917 that produced the Constitution of Mexico. Notable for being a radical ideologue, he served governor of the states of Tabasco and Michoacán as well as the then-Territory of Baja California Sur and Islas Marías. Múgica was the ideological mentor to Lázaro Cárdenas after the military phase of the Revolution and served as member of Cárdenas's cabinet when he was president (1934–40), heading the secretariats of National Economy and Communications and Public Works.

== Early life ==
He was born in Tingüindín, Michoacán. His father was a school teacher, which meant that Múgica had to move from one place to another, causing him to complete his primary education in various schools. After completing his preparatory studies, he began working as a journalist, being a liberal contributor to several newspapers, including Regeneración of Enrique Flores Magón and his brothers. In Zamora, Michoacan, he completed his studies in seminary and started a small opposition newspaper against Porfirio Díaz.

== Mexican Revolution ==
Years later, he moved to Mexico City, where he had contact with various figures in conspiracies for the Mexican Revolution. In 1910 he traveled to San Antonio, Texas, to begin the organization of the revolutionary meetings. He joined forces with Pascual Orozco and took what would become Ciudad Juárez in 1911. Then, with Lucio Blanco, they started to do the first land distribution in Matamoros, Tamaulipas, in 1913. He was subsequently charged with various military activities, such as being a general and lieutenant to Venustiano Carranza and Álvaro Obregón among others. He led the revolutionary forces in Michoacán, where he met Lázaro Cárdenas, to whom he would be his ideological mentor. His military career led to disagreements with General Obregón, who ordered his assassination. Cárdenas let Múgica know the intentions of Obregón and allowed his executioners to escape. At the end of his military career, he was responsible for the Heroic Military Academy (Mexico), the Commander in the South and was Governor of Tabasco and President of the Military Court.

== Political career ==
Múgica participated in the Constituent Congress of 1917. For his positions and his debates with other delegates, he was always remembered as one of the best delegates and fundamental ideologists of the Mexican Revolution. He worked on part of the constitution concerning matters of religion, politics, economics and education. His ideology would be embodied in Articles 3, 27, and 123 of the Constitution of the United Mexican States.

Mugica was made Governor of Michoacán briefly from 1920 to 1921.

On 1 December 1934, Lázaro Cárdenas became the president of Mexico and named Múgica as the Secretary of the National Economy. He immediately made himself identifiable as one of the most "Cardenista" cabinet members, compared to those loyal to Plutarco Elías Calles. Cárdenas had begun to de-establish the Maximato by which Elías Calles had exercised command over every president since he left office in 1928. Múgica, a great ally of Cárdenas, helped in breaking the Maximato by creating a crisis in mid-June 1935 by releasing anti-labor statements made by Calles. The unions began strong protests against the figure of Jefe Máximo (Calles); they were immediately exploited to rid his influence on the government to seek and obtain the resignation of his entire cabinet and oust all Callistas, including Calles's son, the Secretary of Communications and Public Works. Cardenas then appointed Múgica to that post.

With elections due to be held in 1940, Múgica was a natural successor to Cárdenas by being a strong leftist and believed in many of Cádernas's major reforms. Múgica was considered as a candidate for the presidency in 1939, but Cárdenas opted for General Manuel Ávila Camacho, a moderate. Múgica was perceived as much more radical than Cárdenas. His supporters saw him as the great consolidator of the social work begun by Cárdenas, but his opponents saw him as a great danger that would make Mexico a copy of the Soviet Union. Múgica withdrew his candidacy and supported Avila Camacho.

By 1939, the popularity of Cardenas had fallen seriously. Two figures on the right were arising to challenge the Cárdenas legacy: Joaquín Amaro and Juan Andreu Almazán. Cárdenas then realized that the candidacy of Múgica might not be well received by the country or internationally and that he needed a centrist candidate who was much less radical, could unify the divided population, and above all counter the rising popularity of Almazán. For Cárdenas, that was Camacho, the Secretary of Defense; Múgica withdrew his candidacy and endorsed Ávila Camacho, who had never had a close relationship with him.

After the 1940 election, serious conflicts, and accusations of electoral fraud after the victory for Ávila Camacho over Almazán, Múgica was an uncomfortable character for the new government. He not only was a major competitor of the new president but also represented the "old" ideas and reforms from which Ávila Camacho sought to distance himself. However, his revolutionary career and power meant that leaving him out of the government was not feasible. The solution was to appoint him Governor of the Territory of Baja California Sur, one of the most remote, sparsely-populated and underdeveloped areas of the country. He served from 1940 to 1946.

== Later life ==
Years prior to his death, Múgica was involved in various private activities and running a number of prisons, including the Islas Marías. He died in Mexico City at 69.

== See also ==
- Baja California Sur
- List of governors of dependent territories in the 20th century
