= Lourdes Alonso Flores =

Mexican politician (born 1958)

Member of the Chamber of Deputies for the Federal District′s 4th district
- In office 1 September 2006 – 31 August 2009
- Preceded by: Rocío Sánchez Pérez
- Succeeded by: Jaime Cárdenas Gracia

Personal details
- Born: 2 October 1958 (age 67) Michoacán, Mexico
- Party: PRD
- Occupation: Politician

Lourdes Alonso Flores (Note: In this Mexican name, the surname is Alonso and the second or maternal family name is Flores.) (born 2 October 1958) is a Mexican politician affiliated with the Party of the Democratic Revolution. In 2006–2009 she served as a federal deputy in the 60th Congress, representing the Federal District's 4th district.
