= Gracia =

Gracia may refer to:

== Places ==
- Gràcia, a district of Barcelona, Catalonia, Spain
  - Passeig de Gràcia, a street
  - Carrer Gran de Gràcia, a street
  - Travessera de Gràcia, a street
- Alta Gracia, a city located in the Province of Córdoba, Argentina

== Given name ==
- Gracia Baur (born 1982), German singer
- Gracia Baylor (1929–2025), Australian politician
- Gracia Hillman, member of the Election Assistance Commission in the United States
- Hosokawa Gracia (1563–1600), daughter of the samurai Akechi Mitsuhide during the Sengoku era of Japan
- Gracia Mendes Nasi (1510–1569), Portuguese philanthropist and businesswoman; one of the wealthiest Jewish women during the Renaissance
- Gracia Shadrack, Vanuatuan politician and Speaker of the Vanuatu Parliament (2020–2021)

== Surname ==
- Almudena Gracia Manzano (born 1969), Spanish actress, singer, and television presenter, better known as Malena Gracia
- Cédric Gracia (born 1978), French cyclist
- Javi Gracia (born 1970), Spanish footballer and football manager
- Marian Rivera Gràcia (born 1984), Spanish-born Filipino actress and model, better known as Marian Rivera
- Rubén Gracia Calmache (born 1981), Spanish footballer, better known as Cani
- Sancho Gracia (1936–2012), Spanish actor
- Sígfrid Gràcia (1932–2005), Spanish footballer

== Other uses ==
- Gracia (Saint-Émilion), a Bordeaux garagiste winery
- La Campana de Gràcia, Catalan weekly satirical magazine
- Gracia (restaurant), a Mexican restaurant in Seattle, Washington

== See also ==
- García (disambiguation)
- Grazia
