= Armando Barreiro Pérez =

Mexican politician

- Born: 1 December 1953 (age 72); Mexico City, Mexico
- Occupation: Politician
- Political party: PRD

Armando Barreiro Pérez (born 1 December 1953) is a Mexican politician affiliated with the Party of the Democratic Revolution (PRD). In 2006–2009 he served as a federal deputy in the 60th Congress, representing the Federal District's eighth district for the PRD.
