= José Alfonso Suárez del Real =

Mexican journalist and politician

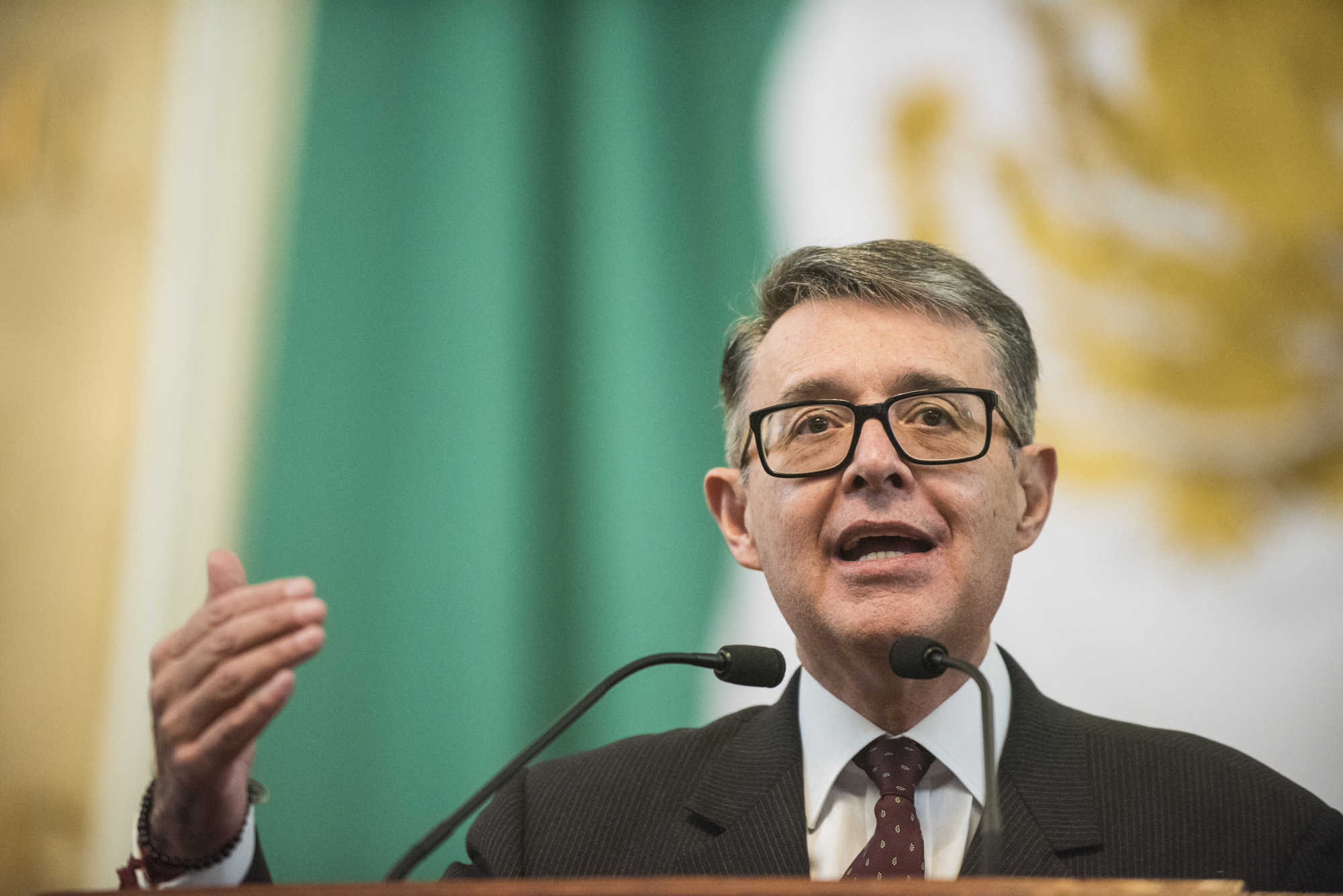
- Suárez del Real in 2016.
- Born: 30 December 1953 (age 72); Mexico City, Mexico
- Occupations: Journalist and politician
- Political party: MORENA

José Alfonso Suárez del Real y Aguilera (born 30 December 1953) is a Mexican journalist and politician. Originally affiliated with the Party of the Democratic Revolution (PRD), he changed his allegiance to the National Regeneration Movement (Morena) in 2010.

In 2006–2009 he served as a federal deputy in the 60th Congress, representing the Federal District's twelfth district for the PRD. In 2015 he was elected to the Legislative Assembly of the Federal District as a member of Morena.

On 26 July 2020, Suárez del Real was appointed to serve as Mexico City's secretary of government by Mayor Claudia Sheinbaum, replacing Rosa Icela Rodríguez. His previous position was as the city's secretary of culture. In July 2021 he was replaced as secretary of government by Martí Batres and took office as chief of staff to the mayor, where he remained for eight months.

On 20 April 2021 he was assigned to head Mexico's diplomatic mission to the Council of Europe in Strasbourg.
