= Mónica Elizabeth Sandoval Hernández =

Mexican politician, born 1975

Mónica Elizabeth Sandoval Hernández (born 25 January 1975) is a Mexican politician. Previously affiliated with the Party of the Democratic Revolution (PRD), she joined the Institutional Revolutionary Party (PRI) after the PRD lost its status as a nationally registered party.

== Biography ==
Sandoval Hernández was born in Tlalpan, Mexico City, in 1975. She is a law graduate and has a master's in oral litigation.

She ran unsuccessfully for a seat in the Chamber of Deputies in the 2021 mid-terms.

In the 2024 general election she stood for Mexico City's 12th district as the candidate of the Fuerza y Corazón por México coalition, comprising the PRD, the PRI and the National Action Party (PAN). She narrowly defeated Alicia Barrientos Pantoja of the National Regeneration Movement by a margin of 44.60% to 44.03%, making her the sole PRD candidate nationwide to win a single-member-district in the election. However, following the cancellation of the PRD's status as a national party, on 20 September 2024 she announced that she would sit as a member of the PRI's congressional delegation.
