= Gracia (restaurant) =

Mexican restaurant in Seattle, Washington, U.S.

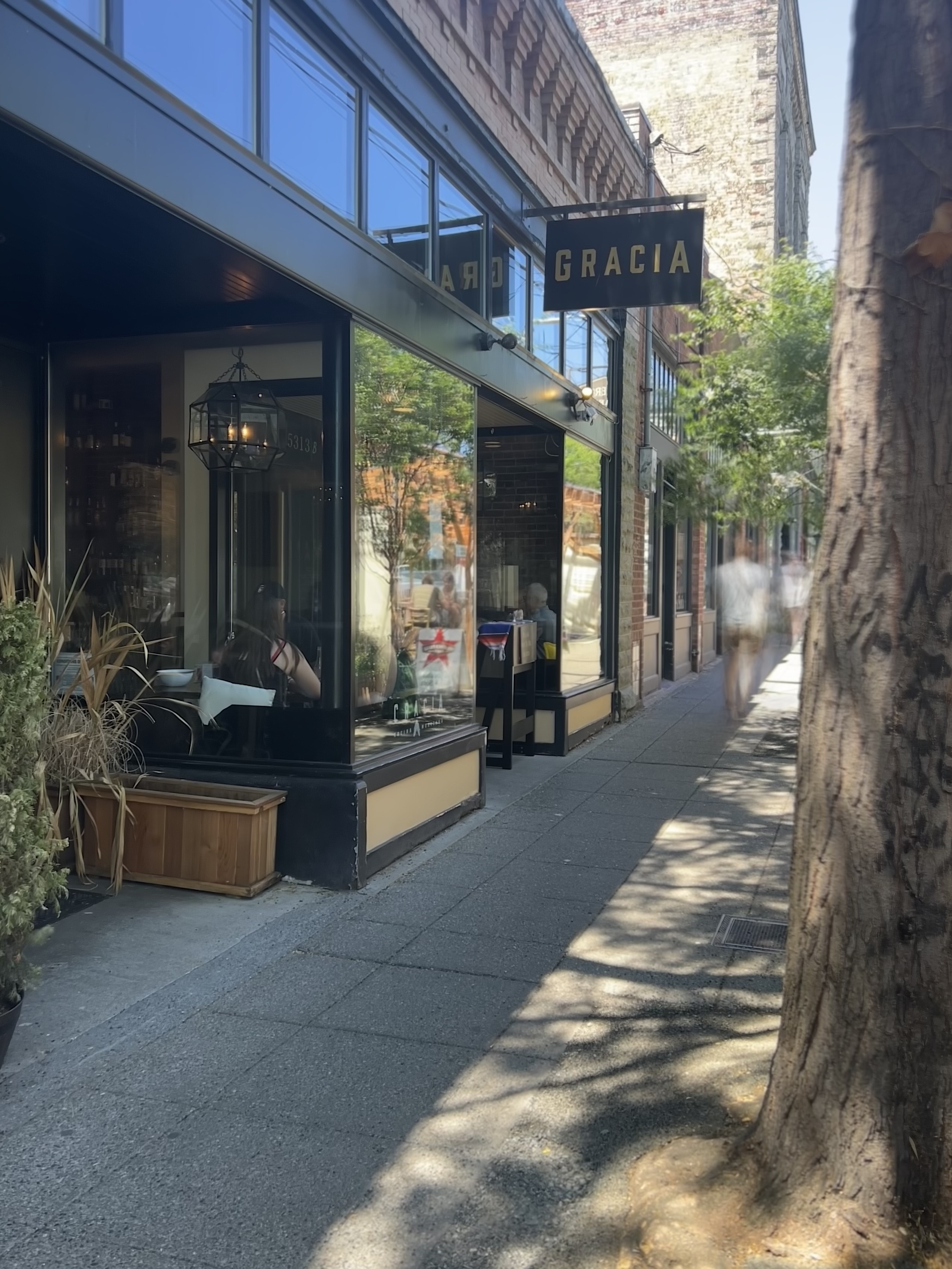
- Interactive map of Gracia

Restaurant information
- Established: February 2016
- Food type: Mexican
- Location: Seattle, Washington, United States
- Coordinates: 47.6666°N 122.3838°W
- Website: graciaseattle.com

Gracia Cocina Mexicana, or simply Gracia, is a Mexican restaurant in Seattle's Ballard neighborhood, in the U.S. state of Washington.

== Description ==
Gracia is a Mexican restaurant on Ballard Avenue in Ballard, Seattle. The menu has included tacos with pork, duck and lamb, burritos, enchiladas, gorditas, huarachitos, and seafood tostadas. The Queso Fundido has vegetarian chorizo and corn tortillas, and the Pulpo a la Macha has octopus, focaccia, salsa macha aioli and onions. The drink menu has been described as "tequila- and mezcal-driven".

== History ==
The restaurant opened in February 2016. The business participated in Day Without Immigrants 2017.

== Reception ==
In 2020, during the COVID-19 pandemic, Eater Seattle included the restaurant in a list of "Where to Get Terrific Tacos in Seattle for Takeout and Delivery". The website's Dylan Joffe, Megan Hill, and Jade Yamazaki Stewart included Gracia in a 2022 list of "16 Marvelous Mexican Restaurants in the Seattle Area". Hill and Stewart also included the business in a 2022 list of "15 Spots for Fantastic Tacos in the Seattle Area".

== See also ==
- List of Mexican restaurants
