= Mauro Huerta Díaz =

Mexican politician

- Born: 23 August 1967 (age 58); Mexico City, Mexico
- Occupations: politician, lawyer, writer, radio
- Political party: PAN (1999–2002); PVEM (since 2002)

Mauro Huerta Díaz (born 23 August 1967) is a Mexican lawyer, politician, author, and journalist from the Ecologist Green Party of Mexico. From 2000 to 2003 he served as a federal deputy in the 58th Congress representing the Federal District's eighth district for the National Action Party (PAN). He published the book Entre gitanos no hay buena ventura (Among gypsies, fortune is not reliable).
