= Agustín Guerrero Castillo =

Mexican politician

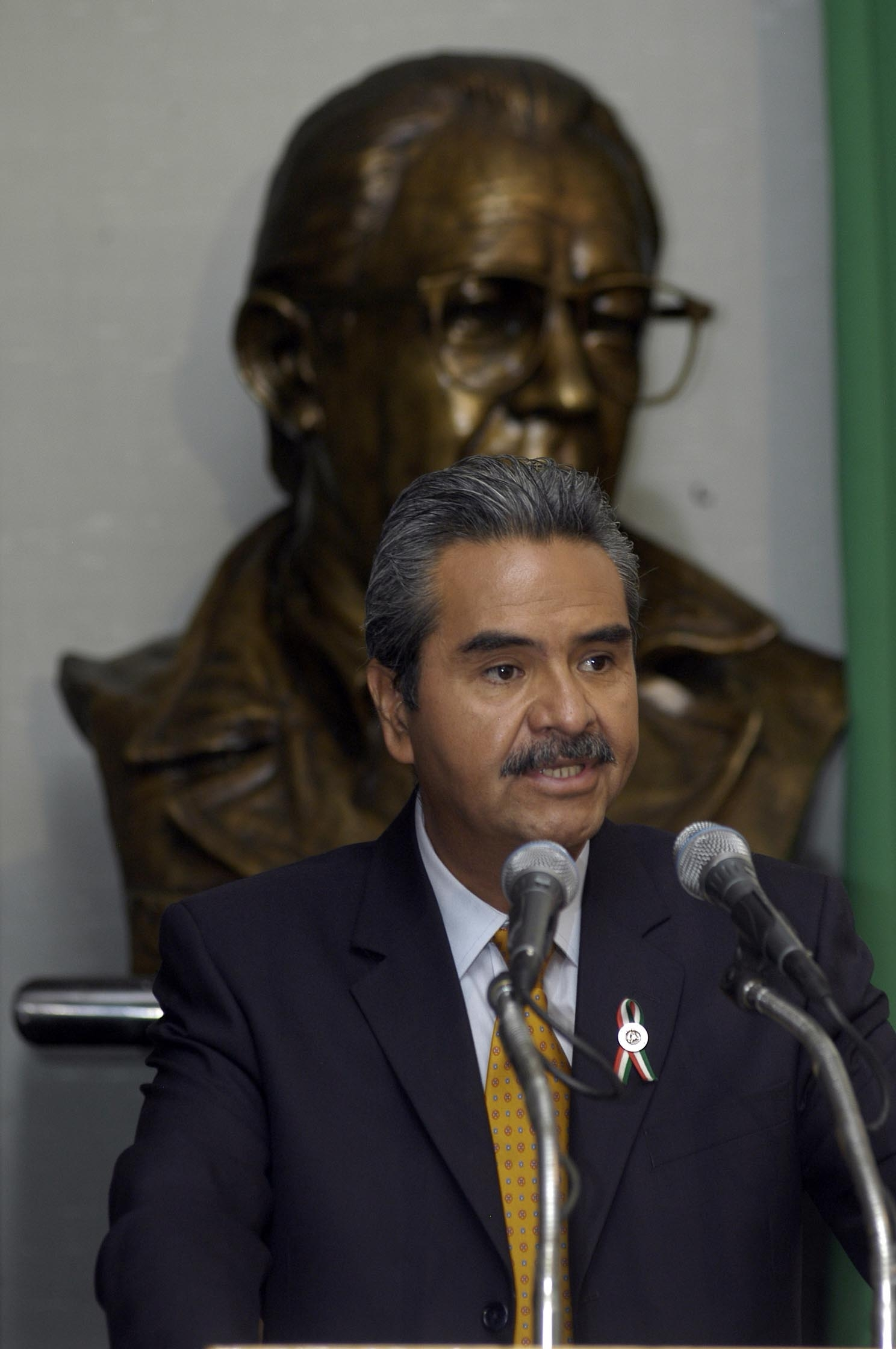
- Born: 30 October 1959 (age 66); Mexico City, Mexico
- Education: National Autonomous University of Mexico
- Occupation: Politician
- Political party: PRD

Agustín Guerrero Castillo (born 30 October 1959) is a Mexican politician from the Party of the Democratic Revolution (PRD). From 2009 to 2012 he served as a federal deputy in the 61st Congress, representing the Federal District's twelfth district for the PRD.
