= Revolutionary Party of National Unification =

The Revolutionary Party of National Unification (Spanish: Partido Revolucionario de Unificación Nacional, PRUN) was a political party in Mexico. The PRUN was founded in 1939, to support the candidacy of General Juan Andreu Almazán in the 1940 presidential election. Almazán got 5.7% of the national vote.
