= Carlos Augusto Morales López =

Mexican politician

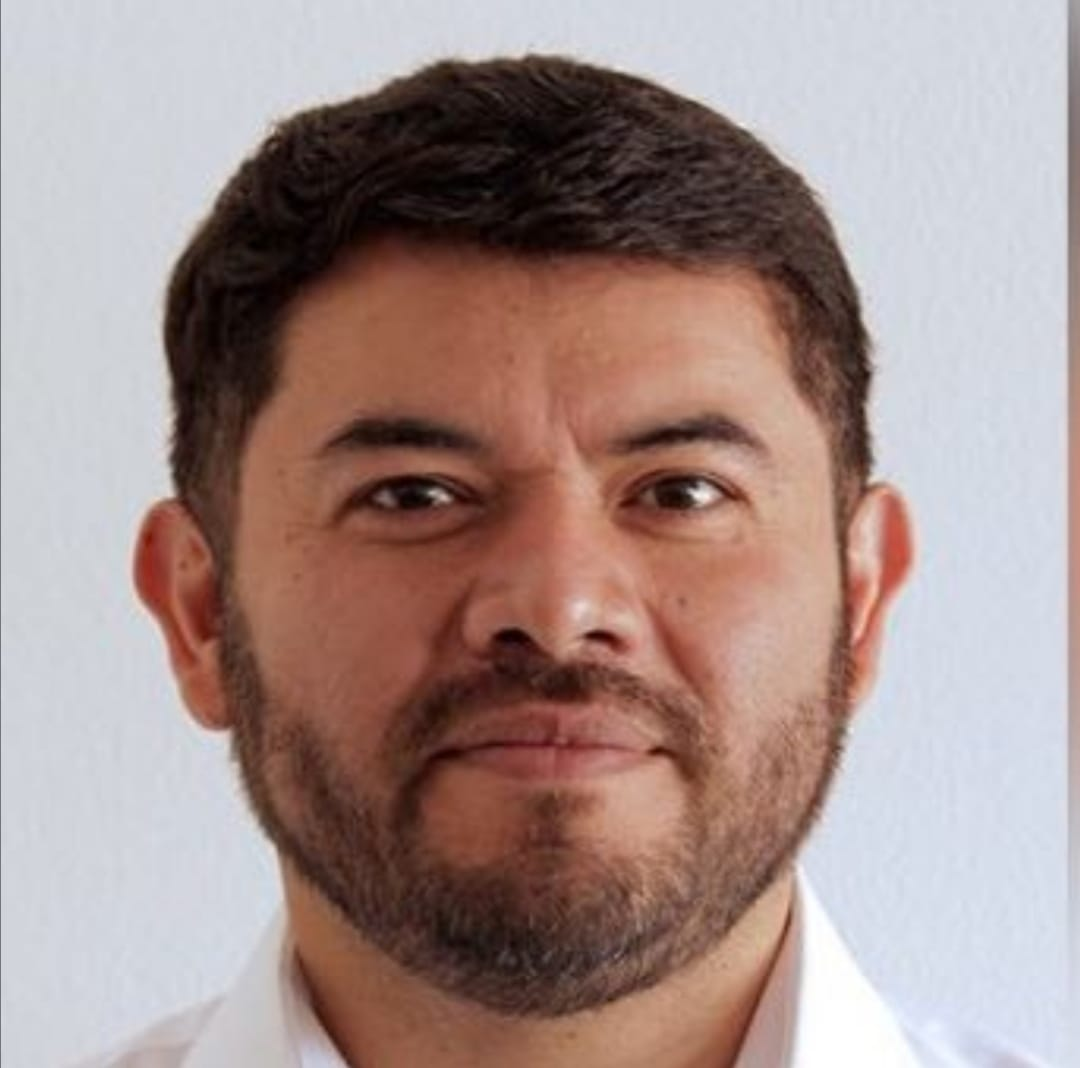
- Morales López in 2017

Former member of the Chamber of Deputies and Chief of the Peacebuilding Strategies Unit.

Personal details
- Born: 5 April 1977 (age 49) Cuauhtémoc, D.F., Mexico
- Party: MORENA
- Education: Economics and Constitutional Law (UNAM)
- Occupation: Public official and former deputy

Carlos Augusto Morales López (Note: In this Mexican name, the surname is Morales and the second or maternal family name is López.) (born 5 April 1977) is a Mexican politician, public official and social movement leader affiliated with Morena. Formerly, he was a member of the Party of the Democratic Revolution (PRD). He served as a federal deputy in the 62nd Congress (2012–2015), representing the Federal District's fourth district for the PRD. Currently, he serves as the Chief of the Peacebuilding Strategies Unit within the Citizen Security and Protection Ministry of the federal government.

Raised in Iztapalapa, an eastern borough of Mexico City, he studied economics at the National Autonomous University of Mexico (UNAM) and earned a master's degree in constitutional law at the same university, with a thesis focused on electoral accountability for legislators.

He was a founding member of the PRD in Mexico City, for which he served as Organization Secretary. From 2009 to 2012 he served as local deputy of the V Legislature of the Federal District Assembly. From 2012 to 2015, he was a Federal Deputy in the LXII Legislature of the Mexican Congress.

Since 2018, he has held several positions in Morena local and federal administrations. During the first year of Dr. Claudia Sheinbaum Pardo as Mexico City Mayor, he worked in the Mobility Secretariat. Afterwards, he served as Chief of Staff and Special advisor to the Office of the Mayor. Since January, 2021, he was appointed to the Citizen Security and Protection Ministry of the Mexican Federal Government by Secretary Rosa Icela Rodriguez, where he is in charge of the "Mesas de Paz" strategy.
