= Alicia Barrientos Pantoja =

Mexican politician, born 1972

Alicia Barrientos Pantoja (born 24 September 1972) is a Mexican politician. She is a member of the National Regeneration Movement (Morena) and previously belonged to the Party of the Democratic Revolution (PRD).

Barrientos was born in Veracruz, Veracruz, in 1972.

In the 2015 mid-terms, as a member of Morena, she was elected to the Chamber of Deputies to represent the Federal District's 12th district during the 63rd session of Congress.

She stood again for the capital's 12th district in the 2024 general election but was narrowly defeated by Mónica Elizabeth Sandoval Hernández of the Fuerza y Corazón por México coalition in a race that won the PRD its sole national single-member-district seat.

In November 2024 she was elected as the general secretary of Morena in Mexico City.
