= Juan Andreu Almazán =

Mexican politician

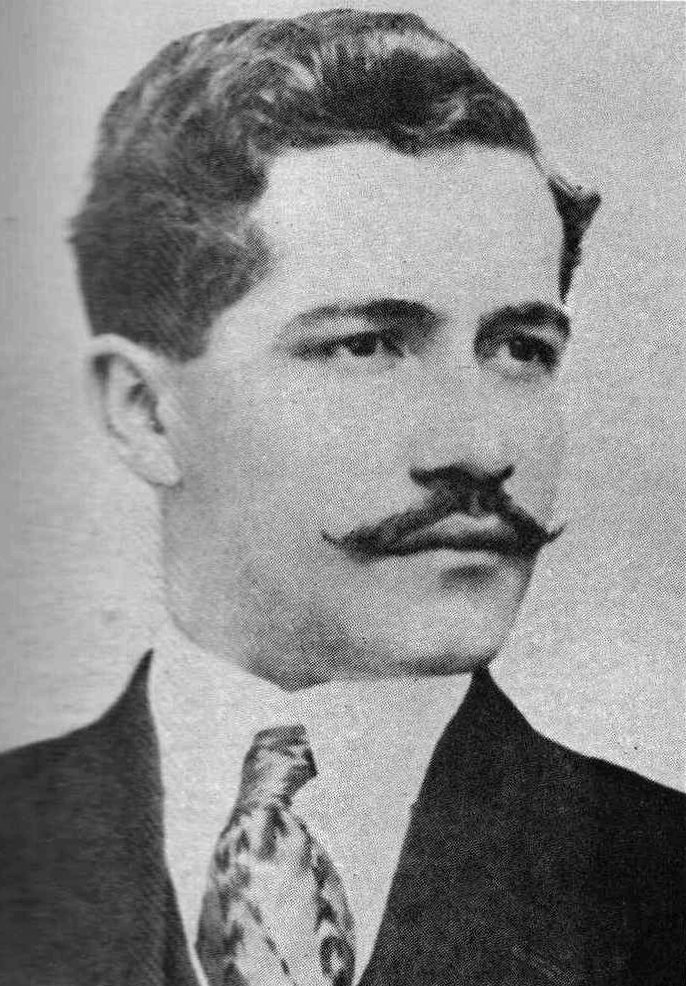
- Gen. Juan Andreu Almazán in May 1916
- Born: 12 May 1891; Olinalá, Guerrero, Mexico
- Died: 9 October 1965 (aged 74); Mexico City, Mexico
- Military career
- Allegiance: Liberation Army of the South
- Service years: 1912–1939
- Rank: General officer
- Conflicts: Mexican Revolution

Juan Andreu Almazán (May 12, 1891 – October 9, 1965) was a Mexican revolutionary general, politician and businessman. He held high posts in the Mexican Army in the 1920s and ran for the presidency of Mexico in 1940 in a highly disputed election, having accumulated great wealth from construction. General Almazán became one of Mexico's and Latin America’s wealthiest citizens in the early 1940s.

== Early life ==
Juan Andreu Almazán was born on May 12, 1891, in the municipality of Olinalá in the State of Guerrero. He was born to Juan Andreu Pareja, a wealthy landowner of Catalan ethnicity, and María Almazán Nava, who was, according to Juan Andreu Almazán, a descendant of Moctezuma I.

== Military career ==
In 1907, he enrolled in a medical school in Puebla, where he started political and military opposition against the dictator Porfirio Díaz. He worked for Francisco I. Madero's presidential campaign to prevent Díaz's re-election. When the Mexican Revolution began, he joined the revolutionaries and abandoned his studies.

As an early supporter of Madero, he followed him into exile in October 1910. In April 1911, he appeared in Morelos and made contact with Emiliano Zapata. He presented himself as an agent of Madero and convinced Zapata to fight under Madero's banner.

In November 1911, almost immediately after Madero was elected president, Zapata broke with Madero and renewed his fight against the government of Mexico City. Juan Andreu Almazán sided with Zapata and joined the rebellion against Madero.

When Madero was deposed and later executed by General Victoriano Huerta in February 1913, Huerta put out peace feelers to all the rebel groups. Zapata had a great dislike for Huerta and refused to make peace. Andreu Almazán, however, did not share Zapata's feelings about Huerta and chose to follow him. He was given a combat command and thereafter became associated with Pascual Orozco, who had also joined Huerta. He and his forces fought against the forces of Pancho Villa. In the battle of Torreón, late March 1914, Almazán commanded a brigade under Gen. José Velasco.

When Huerta was defeated in August 1914, Andreu Almazán and several other generals associated with Orozco, and known as "Colorados," because of their red flag, moved south and joined forces with Zapata. Still, Zapata did not integrate them into his forces but allowed them to operate mainly in the state of Puebla.

The peak mark of Andreu Almazán's military career came in December 1914, when his Colorado forces, supported by the forces of Zapata, forced the Constitutionalist Army of Venustiano Carranza out of the city of Puebla and claimed it for the Liberation Army of the South and the Government of the Convention.

The glory was short-lived, however, because the following month, General Alvaro Obregon's Constitutionalist Army forced Almazán and the Colorados out of Puebla. Thereafter, Andreu Almazán continued to fight against Carranza and his government as a guerrilla faction.

Andreu Almazán continued to associate himself with Zapata until the summer of 1916. In the early summer of that year Félix Díaz returned to Mexico and called for the rebel forces of Mexico to join him in the fight against Carranza. As Zapata's cause seemed to be failing, Andreu Almazán chose to align himself with Díaz.

Throughout 1915, 1916, and 1917, Andreu Almazán operated in the area of Guerrero, Puebla and Oaxaca, primarily as an independent rebel force, yet putting out public pronouncements that he supported either Zapata or Díaz. In early 1918, he changed his base of operations to northeast Mexico, as a rebel force supporting Felix Díaz.

With the Agua Prieta revolt of 1920, Andreu Almazán supported the rebel forces that removed Carranza and established Obregón as President. For his support, Obregón's government confirmed his rank as a general. In 1921 he was promoted to Division General, the highest rank in the army. In the 1920s, he became the director and main stockholder of a roadbuilding firm and began investing his profits in industrial and real estate holdings in Monterrey, Mexico City, and Acapulco. He was loyal to President Plutarco Calles, and as Communications Minister in Ortiz Rubio's cabinet in the early 1930s, he enlarged his already-considerable fortune by granting government concessions, such as the Pan American Highway construction job from Laredo to Mexico City to his own company. During Lázaro Cárdenas's administration, he acquired vast holdings in silver mines. By 1939, he had become one of Mexico's wealthiest citizens.

== Political career ==
In May 1939 he requested retirement from the Mexican Army, which was granted to him on June 30. On July 25, he publicly announced his right-wing candidacy for president in the next year's elections. His supporters, led by former Zapatista Antonio Díaz Soto y Gama, formed the National Action Party. Andreu Almazán was also supported by the Laborist Party. His opponent was Manuel Ávila Camacho of the Party of the Mexican Revolution (PRM). The 1940 elections were violent and irregular, and Ávila Camacho was announced to have won the election with over 93 percent of the popular vote. However, many believed that Andreu Almazán was the real winner.

Alleging fraud, Andreu Almazán traveled to Cuba and later to the United States to meet with officials of the administration of President Franklin Roosevelt and to probe his position in the face of an eventual Almazanist revolution. Although the US government did not look favourably on Cárdenas's radical socialist positions, it was annoyed by Andreu Almazán's alleged friendship with the retired anti-Semitic and openly-fascist US General, George Van Horn Moseley. When it became clear that little support for him existed, he gave up on the idea of a violent revolt, disappointing his supporters. He returned to Mexico and attended the inauguration of Ávila Camacho.
