= 1940 Mexican general election =

- 7 July 1940
- Presidential election
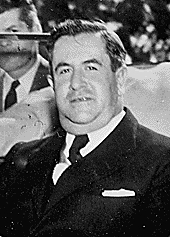

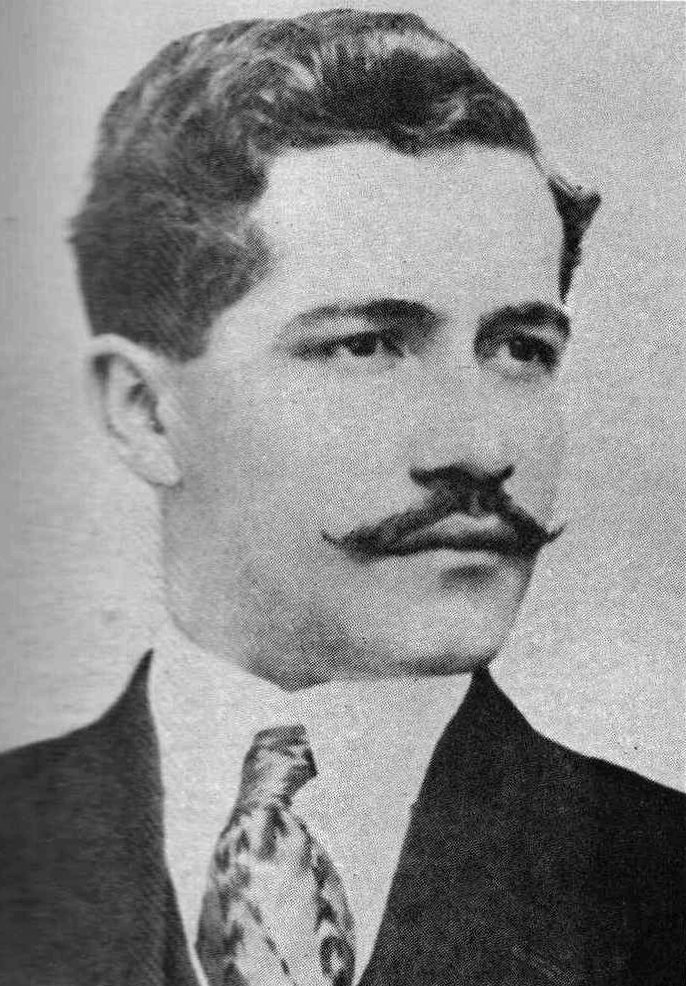
Nominee	Manuel Ávila Camacho	Juan Andreu Almazán
Party	PRM	PRUN
Popular vote	2,476,641	151,101
Percentage	93.90%	5.73%
President before election
Lázaro Cárdenas
PRM
Elected President
Manuel Ávila Camacho
PRM

General elections were held in Mexico on 7 July 1940. The presidential elections were won by Manuel Ávila Camacho, who received 94% of the vote. In the Chamber of Deputies election, the Party of the Mexican Revolution (Partido de la Revolución Mexicana, PRM) won all but one of the 173 seats.

The campaign was very intense, with clashes between Camacho's and Almazán's supporters becoming common throughout the electoral process. This election was notorious for the violent incidents that occurred on election day, resulting in at least 47 deaths and 400 people being injured (most of which were due to an attempt by Almazán supporters to break into the National Palace in protest over an alleged electoral fraud).

This was the only presidential election in which the PRM participated under that name. It had been the National Revolutionary Party (Partido Nacional Revolucionario, PNR) from 1929 to 1938, being renamed Party of the Mexican Revolution (Partido de la Revolución Mexicana, PRM) in 1938, and again changing its name in 1946 to Institutional Revolutionary Party (Partido Revolucionario Institucional, PRI), which remains its current name.

== Campaign ==
Although initially Francisco José Múgica was seen as the likely successor of President Lázaro Cárdenas due to their shared leftist ideology, in the end President Cárdenas appointed Manuel Ávila Camacho as the PRM's presidential candidate. The decision was made due to Ávila Camacho's perceived conciliatory nature and the fact that he was a devout Catholic, which was crucial to defuse tensions between the Party and the Catholic Church in the aftermath of the bloody Cristero War, as well as to appeal to the conservative sectors of the country which had fiercely opposed Cárdenas social reforms. Cárdenas himself explained: "Gral. Múgica, a very dear friend of mine, was a widely known radical. We had barely avoided a civil war and we were putting up with tremendous international pressure due to the oil expropriation. What use could there be in a radical?"

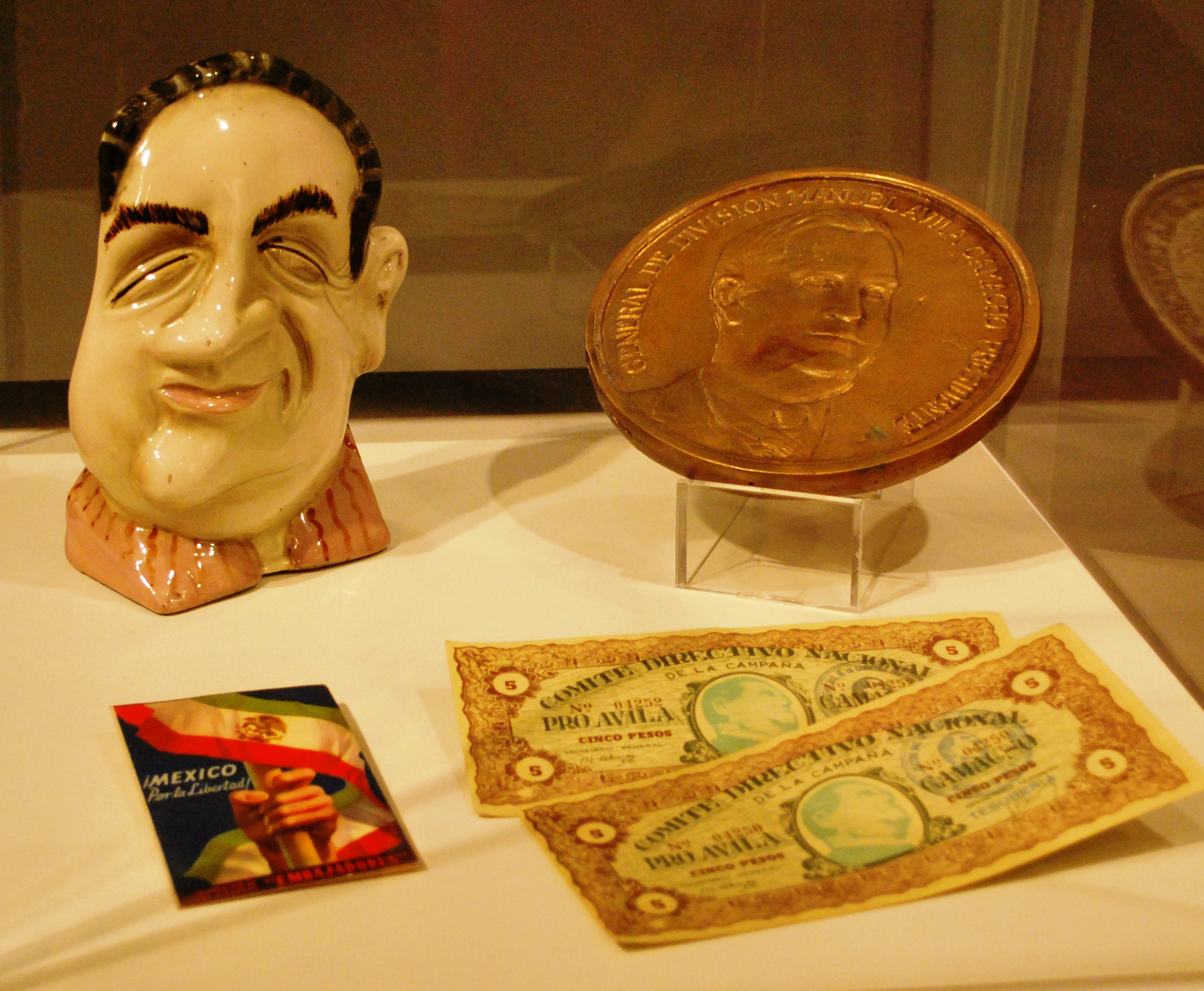
Ávila Camacho campaign items

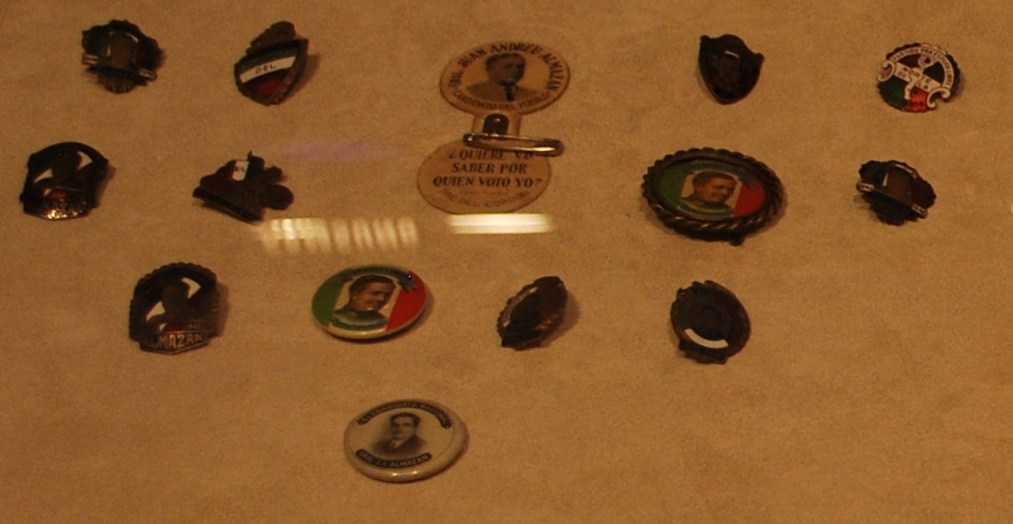
Almazán campaign buttons

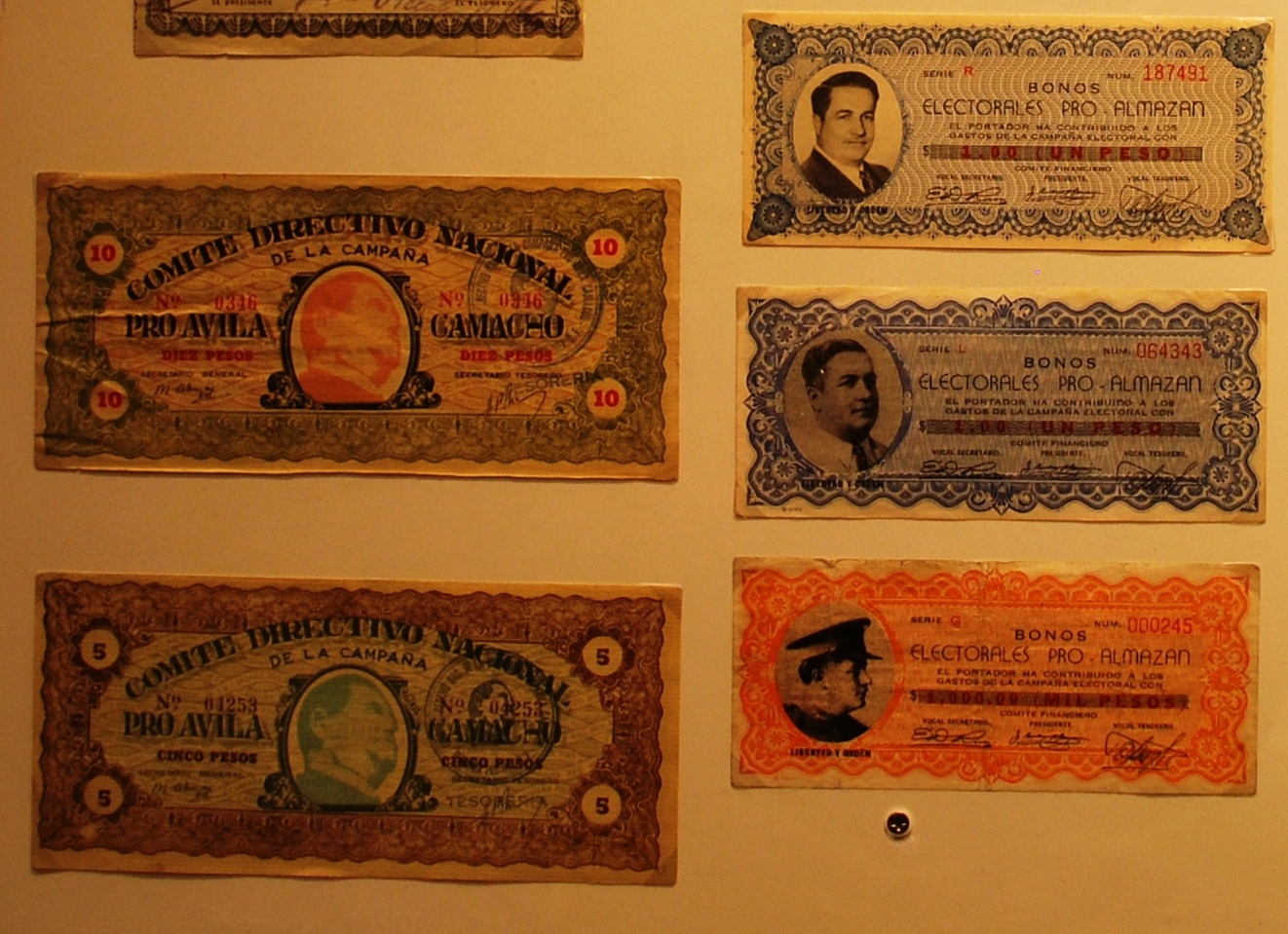
Contribution bonds for the Ávila Camacho and Almazán campaigns

Nevertheless, most Mexican conservatives chose to support an opposition candidate, which they found in Juan Andreu Almazán. A former revolutionary combatant who later served as Communications Minister under Pascual Ortiz Rubio's administration and accumulated great wealth from construction works, Almazán presented himself as a right-wing candidate who would put an end to the "Comunazi degeneration" of the Cárdenas administration, although he promised to maintain the social reforms in case he won.

== Conduct ==
A group of Almazán's supporters attempted to get into the National Palace in Mexico City to protest against the alleged electoral fraud that was taking place. In response, Paramilitary groups shot and killed many of them. President Lázaro Cárdenas himself was unable to vote at his polling place until the nearby violence calmed down. There were violent incidents in other parts of the country as well.

== Results ==
=== President ===
Candidate	Party	Votes	%
Manuel Ávila Camacho	Party of the Mexican Revolution	2,476,641	93.90
Juan Andreu Almazán	Revolutionary Party of National Unification	151,101	5.73
Rafael Sánchez Tapía	Independent	9,840	0.37
Total		2,637,582	100.00
Source: Nohlen

=== Chamber of Deputies ===
Party	Seats
Party of the Mexican Revolution	172
Revolutionary Party of National Unification	1
Total	173
Source: Nohlen

== Aftermath ==
Almazán refused to recognize the official results, claiming that the PRM had organized the violence against his supporters, as well as accusing it of stealing ballot boxes and preventing Almazán's supporters from voting for him.

Afterwards, Almazán fled to Havana, unsuccessfully seeking support from the United States, which recognized Ávila Camacho's victory (although the U.S. government had opposed Cárdenas' social reforms, they saw Almazán's alleged fascist sympathies as a bigger threat). When it became clear that it would be impossible to change the results, Almazán gave up on the idea of a violent revolt. He returned to Mexico and attended the inauguration of Ávila Camacho.
