= Octavio Paz Solórzano =

Mexican politician and journalist (1883–1935)

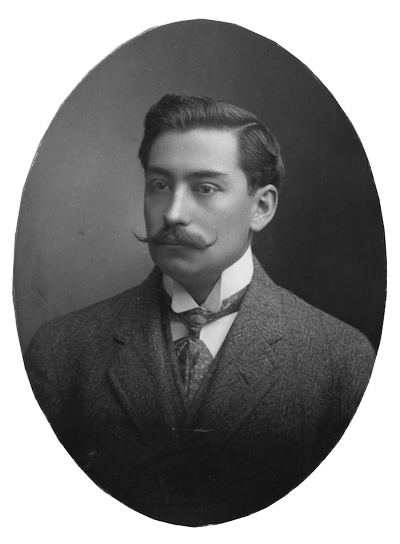
- Paz Solórzano, ca. 1910

Governor of Morelos (acting)
- In office 9 September 1925 – 3 October 1925

Member of the Chamber of Deputies for the Federal District's 10th district
- In office 1920–1922

Personal details
- Born: 20 November 1883 Federal District, Mexico
- Died: 10 March 1935 (aged 51) Los Reyes La Paz, Edomex, Mexico
- Party: PNA
- Children: Octavio Paz
- Parent: Ireneo Paz (father)
- Education: National School of Jurisprudence
- Occupation: Zapatista politician and journalist
- Profession: Lawyer

Octavio Ireneo Paz Solórzano (Note: In this Mexican name, the surname is Paz and the second or maternal family name is Solórzano.) (20 November 1883 – 10 March 1935) was a Mexican politician and journalist. He allied himself with Emiliano Zapata during the 1910–1917 Revolution and later served in Congress for the National Agrarian Party (PNA). He died in a railway accident in 1935 when his son, the poet and future Nobel Prize–winner Octavio Paz Lozano, was 20 years old.

== Life ==
Octavio Paz Solórzano was born in Mexico City on 20 November 1883, the youngest child of Ireneo Paz Flores, a prominent writer and newspaperman, and Clotilde Solórzano. He studied at the National School of Jurisprudence alongside Antonio Caso and José Vasconcelos and graduated in 1911 with a thesis on the freedom of the press. That same year, he married Josefina Lozano. Shortly after, he was recruited by Jesús Flores Magón, then serving in President Francisco I. Madero's cabinet, for a position with the Secretariat of Justice in Ensenada, Baja California, and later in Campeche. Upon returning to the capital, he worked as an agent of the public prosecution service. His only child, Octavio, was born in March 1914. Some months later, Paz Solórzano took up arms and joined the revolutionary forces of Emiliano Zapata. He saw action against Constitutionalist forces to the south of Mexico City in late 1914 and early 1915.

In April 1916, Zapata commissioned him to travel to the United States to disseminate his ideas about agrarian reform; after a difficult journey during which he was pursued by both federal and revolutionary forces, he crossed the border at Laredo and arrived in San Antonio, Texas, on 7 October. There, he publicised Zapata's Plan de Ayala and worked to give a positive impression of the Zapatistas while criticising the Constitutionalist forces of Venustiano Carranza. (Note: During his time in the U.S., he also lobbied for Ricardo Flores Magón's release from prison.) Monitored by the FBI from his arrival, he was arrested in May 1917 but released shortly after they decided he posed no grave threat. In 1918 he relocated to the state of California, where he was joined by his wife and son, while his work shifted from merely putting the Zapatistas' case forward to securing supplies for them. In 1919, he acquired a printing press in Los Angeles, and the company "O. Paz y Cía. Editores" began to publish books and the periodical La Semana. In March 1920, however, he wrote a letter saying that he felt abandoned by his movement and that – together with the meagre income generated by the publishing company – led him to take the difficult decision to return to Mexico. In mid-June 1920, the Paz family returned to Ireneo Paz's home in Mixcoac on the outskirts of Mexico City.

Back in Mexico, Paz was a founding member of National Agrarian Party (PNA), a party based on Zapata's agrarian ideals and dedicated to the pursuit of agrarian reform, led by his friend and fellow Zapatista Antonio Díaz Soto y Gama. (Note: Carmona Dávila incorrectly gives the date as 13 June 1929 instead of 1920. The PNA merged with the National Revolutionary Party (PRN) – the later Institutional Revolutionary Party – in 1929.) In the 1920 general election, Paz was elected to the Chamber of Deputies for the PNA, representing the Federal District's 10th district as part of a seven-member PNA congressional delegation. (Note: In addition to Paz Solórzano and Díaz Soto y Gama, the PNA's representatives in the 29th Congress (1920–1922) were Felipe Carrillo Puerto, Vito Alessio Robles, Juan de Dios Bojórquez, Emilio Portes Gil and Basilio Vadillo.)

In 1924, Paz was serving as government secretary in the Morelos state government under Governor Ismael Velasco. When Velasco was removed from office by the Senate, Paz served as acting governor from 9 September to 3 October 1925, when he was relieved by Joaquín Rojas Hidalgo. Following Rojas's removal from office, in February 1926 Paz was shortlisted for the post of interim governor but was ultimately not selected.

Following the assassination of President-elect Álvaro Obregón in 1928, Paz largely withdrew from public life and dedicated himself to writing. He published a series of articles on the Zapatistas and the Revolution in the weekly magazine supplement of El Universal that were later reprinted in José T. Meléndez's Historia de la revolución mexicana.

"Pasado en claro" (extract)

Del vómito a la sed, atado al potro del alcohol,
mi padre iba y venía entre llamas.
Por los durmientes y los rieles
de una estación de moscas y de polvo
una tarde juntamos sus pedazos.

From vomit to thirst, bound to alcohol's rack,
my father came and went amidst flames.
Between the sleepers and the rails
of a station of flies and dust
one evening we picked up his pieces.

— Octavio Paz, 1976.

On 10 March 1935, after an evening celebrating carnival with the ejidatarios of Santa Martha Acatitla, Paz was struck and dismembered by a train of the Interoceanic Railway in Los Reyes La Paz, State of Mexico. He was buried in Mexico City's Panteón de Dolores on 12 March. His son recalled the incident in the 1976 poem "Pasado en claro".

== Work ==
Paz Solórzano was the editor and manager of his father's newspaper, La Patria, in the early 20th century and he continued to write articles for the press in the years that followed. His published works included:

- Álbum a Juárez (1905, in collaboration with his brother Arturo). A celebration of the life of Benito Juárez, reworked and expanded in 1931.
- Novísimo manual del elector (1911). A pamphlet with suggestions for the conduct of the 1911 general election.
- Emiliano Zapata (1986). A posthumous collection of Paz's articles that appeared in El Universal's Magazine para Todos in 1929 and in El Porvenir in 1933 and 1934. Originally part of the three-volume Historia de la revolución mexicana (ed. José T. Meléndez, 1936), a separate edition, with a prologue by Octavio Paz, was published in 1986.
