= Agustín Barrios =

Agustín Barrios may refer to:

- Agustín Barrios (actor) (d. 1965), Argentine actor
- Agustín Pío Barrios Mangoré (1885-1944), Paraguayan guitarist and composer
- Agustín Barrios Gómez Méndez (1925–1999), Mexican journalist, TV presenter and diplomat
- Agustín Barrios Gómez Segués (b. 1971), Mexican businessman
