= Agustín Barrios Gómez =

Agustín Barrios Gómez may refer to:

- Agustín Barrios Gómez Méndez (1925–1999), father of Gómez Segués, Mexican journalist, TV presenter and diplomat
- Agustín Barrios Gómez Segués (b. 1971), son of Gómez Méndez, Mexican businessman
