= Lozano =

Lozano may refer to:

== Places ==
- Lozano, Jujuy, a rural municipality and village in Jujuy Province in Argentina
- Lozano, Texas, a census-designated place in Cameron County, United States
- Padre Lozano, a village and rural municipality in Salta Province in northwestern Argentina
- Luanda Lozano (born 1973) Angolan and Dominican printmaker, visual artist

== People ==
- Lozano (surname)
