= 11th federal electoral district of Mexico City =

Federal electoral district of Mexico

Mexico City's 11th
- Electoral district of the Chamber of Deputies of Mexico

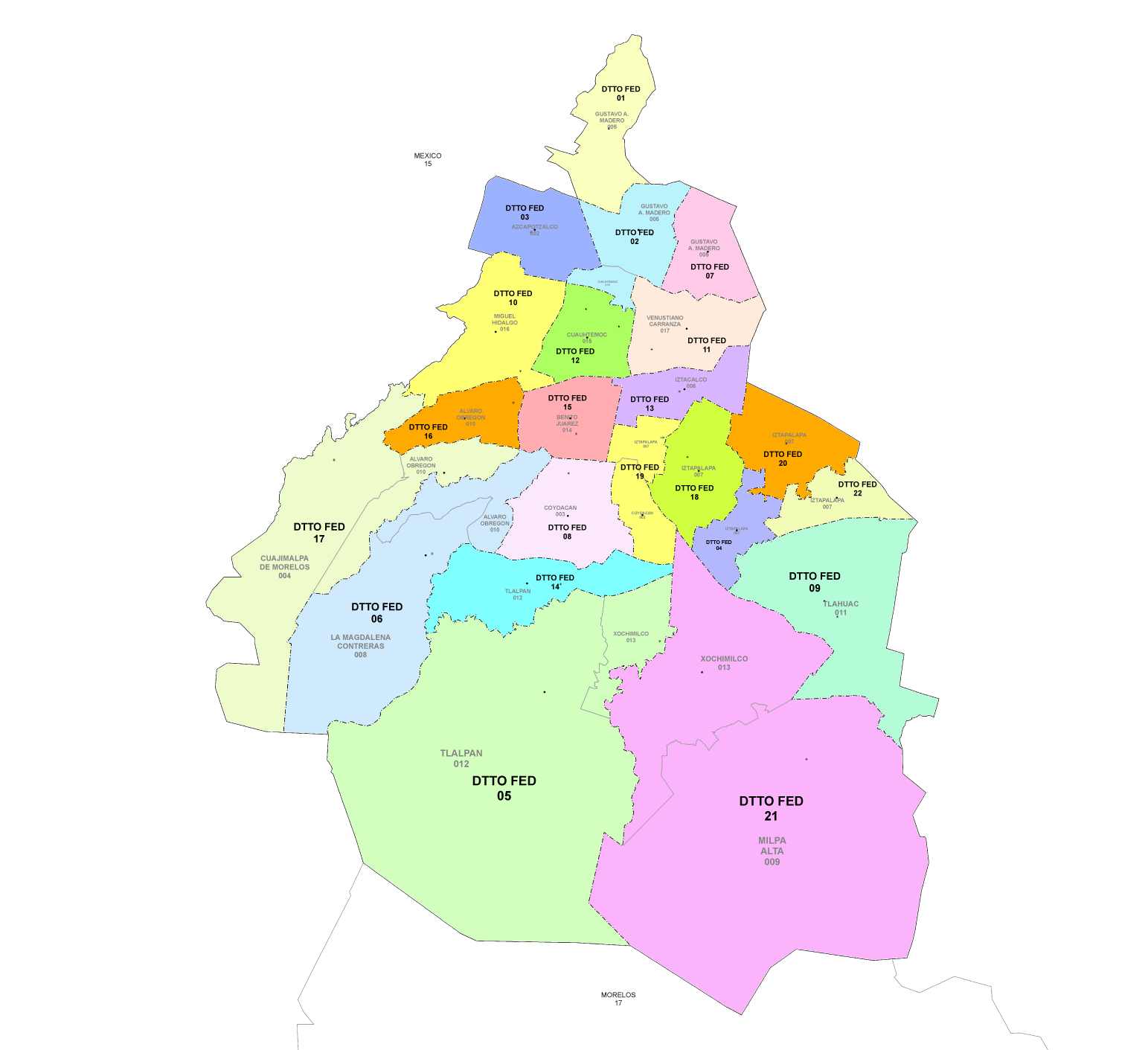
- 11th district since 2023

Incumbent
- Member: Elena Segura Trejo
- Party: ▌Morena
- Congress: 66th (2024–2027)

District
- State: Mexico City
- Head town: Venustiano Carranza
- Coordinates: 19°25′00″N 99°06′50″W
- Covers: Venustiano Carranza
- PR region: Fourth
- Precincts: 336
- Population: 443,704 (2020 census)

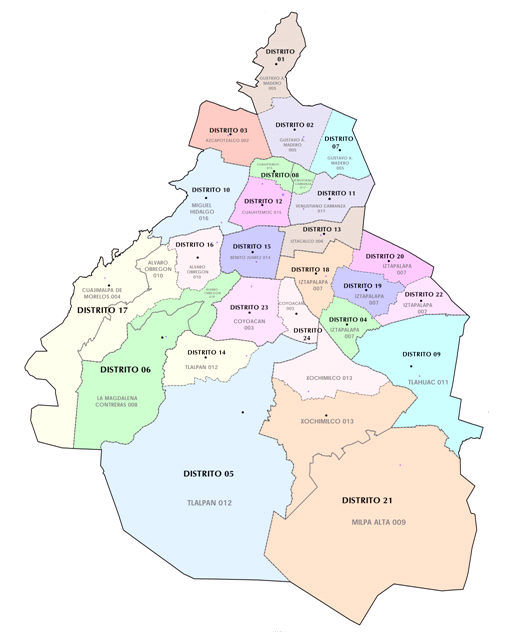
Mexico City under the 2017–2022 districting plan

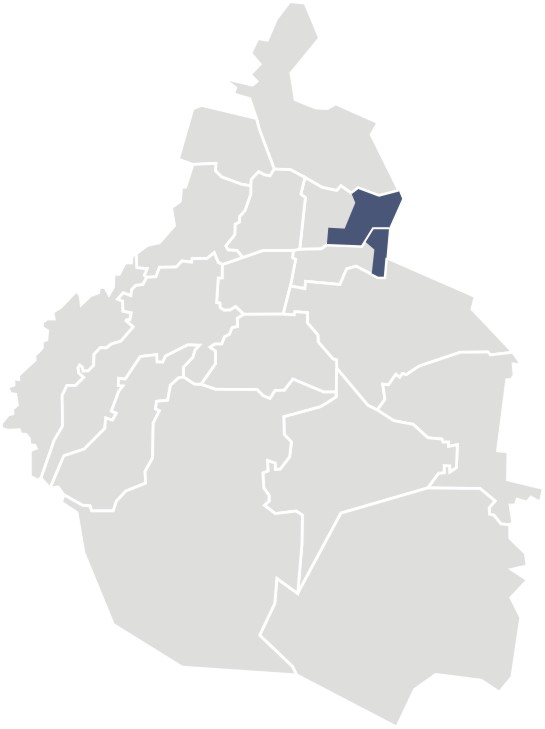
11th district in 2005–2017

The 11th federal electoral district of Mexico City (Spanish: Distrito electoral federal 11 de la Ciudad de México; previously "of the Federal District") is one of the 300 electoral districts into which Mexico is divided for elections to the federal Chamber of Deputies and one of 22 such districts in Mexico City.

It elects one deputy to the lower house of Congress for each three-year legislative session by means of the first-past-the-post system. Votes cast in the district also count towards the calculation of proportional representation ("plurinominal") deputies elected from the fourth region.

The current member for the district, elected in the 2024 general election, is Elena Edith Segura Trejo of the National Regeneration Movement (Morena).

== District territory ==
Under the 2023 districting plan adopted by the National Electoral Institute (INE), which is to be used for the 2024, 2027 and 2030 federal elections, the eleventh district covers the 336 electoral precincts (secciones electorales) that make up borough (alcaldía) of Venustiano Carranza.

The district reported a population of 443,704 in the 2020 census.

== Previous districting schemes ==
Evolution of electoral district numbers
	1974	1978	1996	2005	2017	2023
Mexico City (Federal District)	27	40	30	27	24	22
Chamber of Deputies	196	300				

2017–2022

From 2017 to 2022, the district covered most of Venustiano Carranza, with the exception of its north-western corner, assigned to the 8th district.

2005–2017

Under the 2005 districting scheme, the 11th district covered the eastern portion of the borough of Venustiano Carranza and the eastern edge of Iztacalco.

1996–2005

Between 1996 and 2005, the district covered the eastern portion of Venustiano Carranza only.

1978–1996

The districting scheme in force from 1978 to 1996 was the result of the 1977 electoral reforms, which increased the number of single-member seats in the Chamber of Deputies from 196 to 300. Under that plan, the Federal District's seat allocation rose from 27 to 40. The 11th district covered portions of the boroughs of Cuauhtémoc and Gustavo A. Madero.

== Deputies returned to Congress ==
(Mexico) National parties
- Current
- PAN
- PRI
- PT
- PVEM
- MC
- Morena
- PAZ
- Somos
- Defunct or local only
- PLM
- PNR
- PRM
- PNM
- PP
- PPS
- PARM
- PFCRN
- CON
- PANAL
- PSD
- PES
- PES
- PRD

Mexico City's 11th district
Election	Deputy	Party	Term	Legislature
1916	Ciro B. Ceballos	PLC	1916–1917	Constituent Congress of Querétaro
1917; 1918	Genaro Palacios Moreno	PLN	1917–1920	27th Congress; 28th Congress
1920	Jorge Prieto Laurens	PLCNU	1920–1922	29th Congress
1922	José F. Gutiérrez		1922–1924	30th Congress
1924; 1926	Ernesto Prieto	PRNTM	1924–1928	31st Congress; 32nd Congress
1928	Ricardo Topete	PO	1928–1930	33rd Congress
1930	Vacant		1930–1932	34th Congress
1932	Guillermo Zárraga		1932–1934	35th Congress
1934	Jesús Vidales Marroquín (Note: Vidales was impeached and removed from office on 12 September 1935.)		1934–1935	36th Congress
	Rafael Padilla Flores		1935–1937	36th Congress
1937	J. Jesús Rico		1937–1940	37th Congress
1940	Jesús de la Garza	PRUN	1940–1943	38th Congress
1943	Sacramento Joffre Vázquez (Note: Joffre Vázquez resigned his seat on 2 February 1945.); Emiliano Aguilar		1943–1945; 1945–1946	39th Congress
1946	Vacant		1946–1949	40th Congress
1949	Aarón Camacho López		1949–1952	41st Congress
1952	Eugenio Ibarrola Santoyo		1952–1955	42nd Congress
1955	Francisco Aguirre Alegría		1955–1958	43rd Congress
1958	J. Jesús López González		1958–1961	44th Congress
1961	Carlos Zapata Vela		1961–1964	45th Congress
1964	Luis Priego Ortiz		1964–1967	46th Congress
1967	Pedro Rosas Rodríguez		1967–1970	47th Congress
1970	Juan Rodríguez Salazar		1970–1973	48th Congress
1973	Juan José Hinojosa Hinojosa		1973–1976	49th Congress
1976	Jaime Aguilar Álvarez		1976–1979	50th Congress
1979	Manuel Germán Parra y Prado		1979–1982	51st Congress
1982	Enrique León Martínez		1982–1985	52nd Congress
1985	Lulio Valenzuela Herrera		1985–1988	53rd Congress
1988	Patricia Garduño Morales		1988–1991	54th Congress
1991	José Antonio González Fernández		1991–1994	55th Congress
1994	Alejandro Rojas Díaz Durán		1994–1997	56th Congress
1997	Octavio Hernández Calzada		1997–2000	57th Congress
2000	Francisco Ramírez Cabrera		2000–2003	58th Congress
2003	Alfonso Ramírez Cuéllar		2003–2006	59th Congress
2006	Víctor Hugo García Rodríguez		2006–2009	60th Congress
2009	Laura Piña Olmedo		2009–2012	61st Congress
2012	Luis Espinosa Cházaro		2012–2015	62nd Congress
2015	Rafael Hernández Soriano		2015–2018	63rd Congress
2018	Rocío Barrera Badillo		2018–2021	64th Congress
2021	Lidia Pérez Bárcenas		2021–2024	65th Congress
2024	Elena Edith Segura Trejo		2024–2027	66th Congress

== Presidential elections ==
Mexico City's 11th district
Election	District won by	Party or coalition	%
2018	Andrés Manuel López Obrador	Juntos Haremos Historia	56.0653
2024	Claudia Sheinbaum Pardo	Sigamos Haciendo Historia	54.7684
