= Víctor Hugo García =

Víctor Hugo García may refer to:

- Víctor Hugo García Rodríguez (born 1965), Mexican politician
- Víctor García (footballer, born June 1994) ("Víctor Hugo García Hernández")
