= María Gabriela González Martínez =

Mexican politician

Member of the Chamber of Deputies for the Federal District's 10th district
- In office 1 September 2006 – 31 August 2009
- Preceded by: Roberto Colín Gamboa
- Succeeded by: Gabriela Cuevas Barron

Personal details
- Born: 7 April 1975 (age 50) Mexico City, Mexico
- Party: PAN
- Occupation: Politician

María Gabriela González Martínez (born 7 April 1975) is a Mexican politician affiliated with the National Action Party (PAN). In 2006–2009 she served as a federal deputy in the 60th Congress, representing the Federal District's tenth district for the PAN.
