= Yolanda Carenzo =

Argentine pianist (1902–1968)

- Born: Yolanda Pérez Torres; 16 February 1902; San Salvador de Jujuy, Argentina
- Died: 20 November 1968 (aged 66); Córdoba, Argentina
- Occupations: Pianist, hostess

Yolanda Pérez de Carenzo (16 February 1902 – 20 November 1968), known as La Niña Yolanda, was an Argentine pianist.

== Early life ==
Yolanda Pérez Torres was born in San Salvador de Jujuy, the daughter of Pedro José Pérez and María Teresa Torres Portillo. Her mother was born in Bolivia, and her father was governor of Jujuy Province.

== Career ==
Carenzo taught school as a young woman. In 1936 she gave a series of piano concerts for Radio Municipal de Buenos Aires. She held gatherings of artists, performers, and writers in her home in Lozano, including Agustín Lara, Narciso Yepes, Gabriela Mistral and Pablo Neruda among her guests. She sheltered musician and writer Atahualpa Yupanqui during the 1950s, when he was facing government persecution. Carenzo was considered one of the first women in her province to drive a car and to smoke in public.

Carenzo's close friends, Gustavo "Cuchi" Leguizamón and Manuel J. Castilla, wrote a popular song, "Zamba de Lozano", for her on the occasion of her fiftieth birthday. Argentine singer Mercedes Sosa recorded the song and sang it in concerts.

== Personal life and legacy ==
Pérez married Luis Alberto Carenzo Bancalari (1896–1955) in 1922; they had four children together. She died in 1968, aged 66 years, in Córdoba. "La serenata a la Niña Yolanda", an annual music festival in her memory, has been held on her former estate, la Finca Carenzo, in Lozano, since it was originally organized by her son Marcelo Carenzo Pérez in 1995.
