= Mauricio Candiani =

Mexican politician and businessman

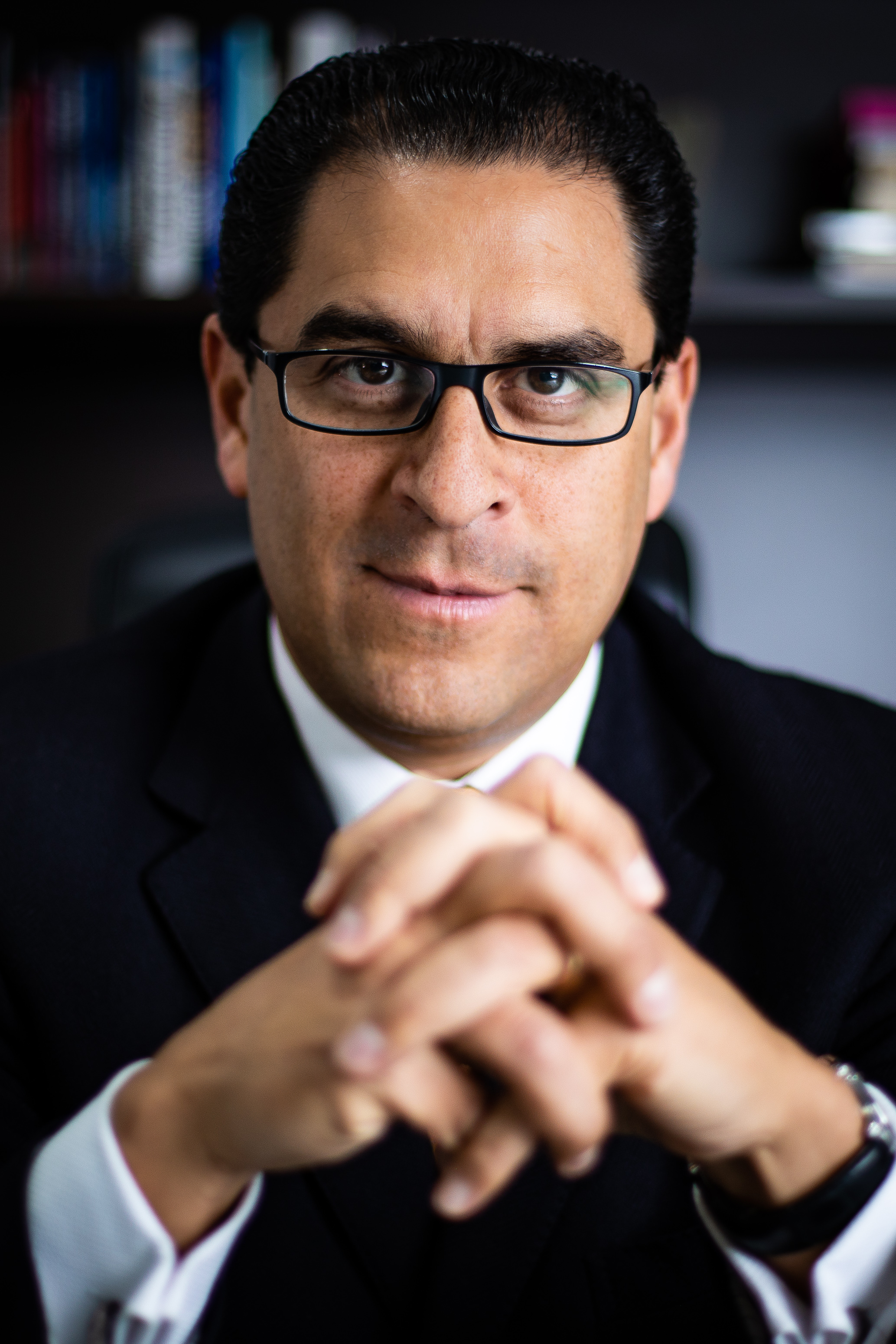
- Mauricio Candiani

Member of the Chamber of Deputies for the Federal District′s 10th district
- In office 1 September 2000 – 31 August 2003
- Preceded by: Cuauhtémoc Velasco Oliva
- Succeeded by: Roberto Colín Gamboa

Personal details
- Born: 24 November 1972 (age 53) Mexico City, Mexico
- Party: PAN
- Occupation: Politician

Mauricio Enrique Candiani Galaz (born 24 November 1972) is a Mexican politician and businessman from the National Action Party (PAN). From 2000 to 2003 he served as a federal deputy in the 58th Congress, representing the Federal District's tenth district for the PAN.
