= 10th federal electoral district of Mexico City =

Federal electoral district of Mexico

Mexico City's 10th
- Electoral district of the Chamber of Deputies of Mexico

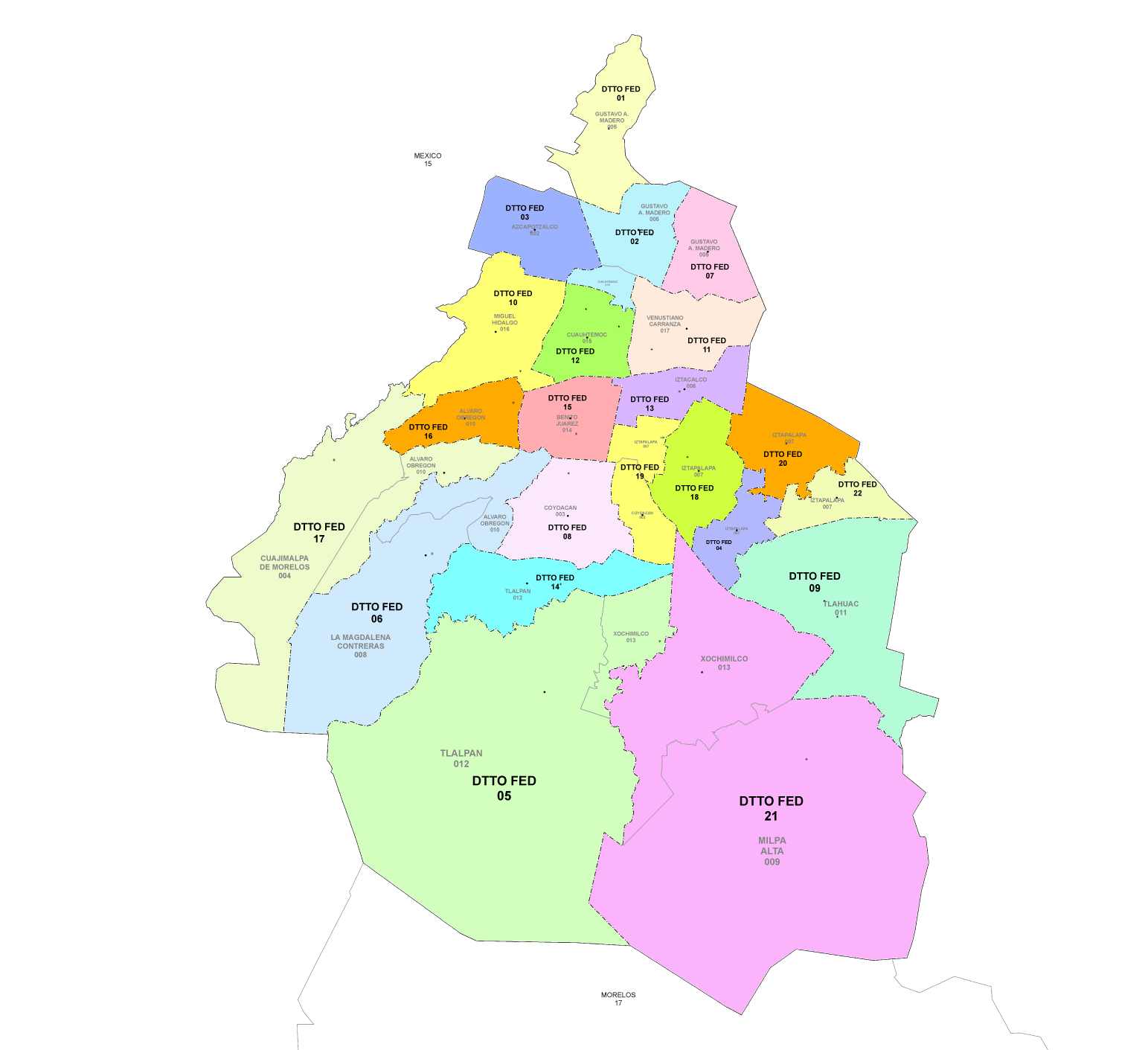
- 10th district since 2023

Incumbent
- Member: Margarita Zavala
- Party: ▌National Action Party
- Congress: 66th (2024–2027)

District
- State: Mexico City
- Head town: Miguel Hidalgo
- Coordinates: 19°24′24″N 99°11′28″W
- Covers: Miguel Hidalgo
- PR region: Fourth
- Precincts: 262
- Population: 414,411 (2020 census)

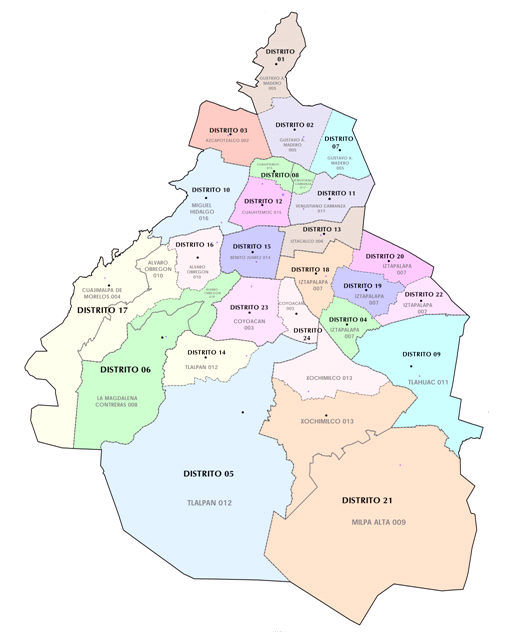
Mexico City under the 2017–2022 districting plan

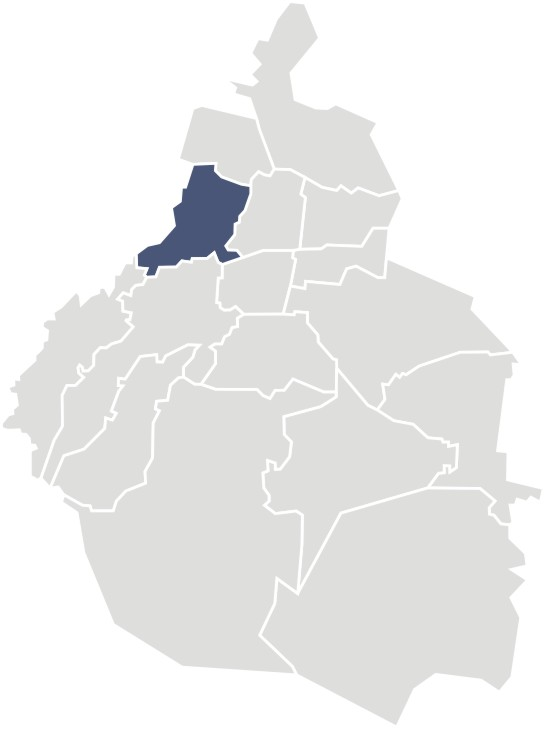
10th district in 2005–2017

The 10th federal electoral district of Mexico City (Spanish: Distrito electoral federal 10 de la Ciudad de México; previously "of the Federal District") is one of the 300 electoral districts into which Mexico is divided for elections to the federal Chamber of Deputies and one of 22 such districts in Mexico City.

It elects one deputy to the lower house of Congress for each three-year legislative session by means of the first-past-the-post system. Votes cast in the district also count towards the calculation of proportional representation ("plurinominal") deputies elected from the fourth region.

The current member for the district, re-elected in the 2024 general election, is Margarita Zavala of the National Action Party (PAN).

== District territory ==
Under the 2023 districting plan adopted by the National Electoral Institute (INE), which is to be used for the 2024, 2027 and 2030 federal elections, the tenth district covers the 262 electoral precincts (secciones electorales) that make up the borough (alcaldía) of Miguel Hidalgo.

The district reported a population of 414,411 in the 2020 census.

== Previous districting schemes ==
Evolution of electoral district numbers
| | 1974 | 1978 | 1996 | 2005 | 2017 | 2023 |
|---|---|---|---|---|---|---|
| Mexico City (Federal District) | 27 | 40 | 30 | 27 | 24 | 22 |
| Chamber of Deputies | 196 | 300 | | | | |

2005–2022

Under both the 2005 and 2017 plans, the 10th district covered the whole of the borough of Miguel Hidalgo.

1996–2005

Between 1996 and 2005, the district covered the southern two-thirds of Miguel Hidalgo, with the remainder assigned to the 5th district.

1978–1996

The districting scheme in force from 1978 to 1996 was the result of the 1977 electoral reforms, which increased the number of single-member seats in the Chamber of Deputies from 196 to 300. Under that plan, the Federal District's seat allocation rose from 27 to 40. The 10th district covered a portion of the borough of Gustavo A. Madero.

== Deputies returned to Congress ==
(Mexico) National parties
- Current
- PAN
- PRI
- PT
- PVEM
- MC
- Morena
- PAZ
- Somos
- Defunct or local only
- PLM
- PNR
- PRM
- PNM
- PP
- PPS
- PARM
- PFCRN
- CON
- PANAL
- PSD
- PES
- PES
- PRD

Mexico City's 10th district
| Election | Deputy | Party | Term | Legislature |
|---|---|---|---|---|
| 1916 | Fernando Vizcaíno | | 1916–1917 | Constituent Congress of Querétaro |
| 1917 | Manuel García Vigil | | 1917–1918 | 27th Congress |
| 1918 | Rafael Cárdenas Zepeda | PLN | 1918–1920 | 28th Congress |
| 1920 | Octavio Paz Solórzano | PNA | 1920–1922 | 29th Congress |
| 1922 | Mauricio Gómez | | 1922–1924 | 30th Congress |
| 1924; 1926 | José F. Gutiérrez | | 1924–1928 | 31st Congress; 32nd Congress |
| 1928 | Ernesto Prieto | CI | 1928–1930 | 33rd Congress |
| 1930 | Vacant | | 1930–1932 | 34th Congress |
| 1932 | José Torres H. | Institutional Revolutionary Party | 1932–1934 | 35th Congress |
| 1934 | Manuel Ramos | Institutional Revolutionary Party | 1934–1937 | 36th Congress |
| 1937 | Manuel Flores Villar | Institutional Revolutionary Party | 1937–1940 | 37th Congress |
| 1940 | Carlos Zapata Vela | Institutional Revolutionary Party | 1940–1943 | 38th Congress |
| 1943 | Antonio Ulíbarri Camacho | Institutional Revolutionary Party | 1943–1946 | 39th Congress |
| 1946 | Victor Herrera González | Institutional Revolutionary Party | 1946–1949 | 40th Congress |
| 1949 | Eduardo Facha Gutiérrez | National Action Party (Mexico) | 1949–1952 | 41st Congress |
| 1952 | Antonio Rivas Ramírez | Institutional Revolutionary Party | 1952–1955 | 42nd Congress |
| 1955 | José Rodríguez Granada | Institutional Revolutionary Party | 1955–1958 | 43rd Congress |
| 1958 | Roberto Gavaldón | Institutional Revolutionary Party | 1958–1961 | 44th Congress |
| 1961 | Manuel Álvarez González | Institutional Revolutionary Party | 1961–1964 | 45th Congress |
| 1964 | Juan Moisés Calleja García | Institutional Revolutionary Party | 1964–1967 | 46th Congress |
| 1967 | Manuel Álvarez González | Institutional Revolutionary Party | 1967–1970 | 47th Congress |
| 1970 | Juan Moisés Calleja García | Institutional Revolutionary Party | 1970–1973 | 48th Congress |
| 1973 | Simón García Rodríguez | Institutional Revolutionary Party | 1973–1976 | 49th Congress |
| 1976 | Gloria Carrillo Salinas | Institutional Revolutionary Party | 1976–1979 | 50th Congress |
| 1979 | Ignacio Zúñiga González | Institutional Revolutionary Party | 1979–1982 | 51st Congress |
| 1982 | Manuel Osante López | Institutional Revolutionary Party | 1982–1985 | 52nd Congress |
| 1985 | Jaime Aguilar Álvarez Mazarrasa | Institutional Revolutionary Party | 1985–1988 | 53rd Congress |
| 1988 | Jorge Gómez Villareal | Popular Socialist Party (Mexico) | 1988–1991 | 54th Congress |
| 1991 | Manuel Solares Mendiola | Institutional Revolutionary Party | 1991–1994 | 55th Congress |
| 1994 | Jaime Jesús Arceo Castro; Olegario Humberto Ortega Ríos | Institutional Revolutionary Party | 1994–1996; 1996–1997 | 56th Congress |
| 1997 | Cuauhtémoc Velasco Oliva | Party of the Democratic Revolution | 1997–2000 | 57th Congress |
| 2000 | Mauricio Candiani | National Action Party (Mexico) | 2000–2003 | 58th Congress |
| 2003 | Roberto Colín Gamboa | National Action Party (Mexico) | 2003–2006 | 59th Congress |
| 2006 | María Gabriela González Martínez | National Action Party (Mexico) | 2006–2009 | 60th Congress |
| 2009 | Gabriela Cuevas Barrón | National Action Party (Mexico) | 2009–2012 | 61st Congress |
| 2012 | Agustín Barrios Gómez Segués | Party of the Democratic Revolution | 2012–2015 | 62nd Congress |
| 2015 | Jorge Triana Tena | National Action Party (Mexico) | 2015–2018 | 63rd Congress |
| 2018 | Javier Hidalgo Ponce | National Regeneration Movement | 2018–2021 | 64th Congress |
| 2021 | Margarita Zavala Gómez del Campo | National Action Party (Mexico) | 2021–2024 | 65th Congress |
| 2024 | Margarita Zavala Gómez del Campo | National Action Party (Mexico) | 2024–2027 | 66th Congress |

== Presidential elections ==
Mexico City's 10th district
| Election | District won by | Party or coalition | % |
|---|---|---|---|
| 2018 | Andrés Manuel López Obrador | Juntos Haremos Historia | 46.0963 |
| 2024 | Bertha Xóchitl Gálvez Ruiz | Fuerza y Corazón por México | 50.2177 |
