= Octavio Paz =

Mexican writer, poet and diplomat (1914–1998)

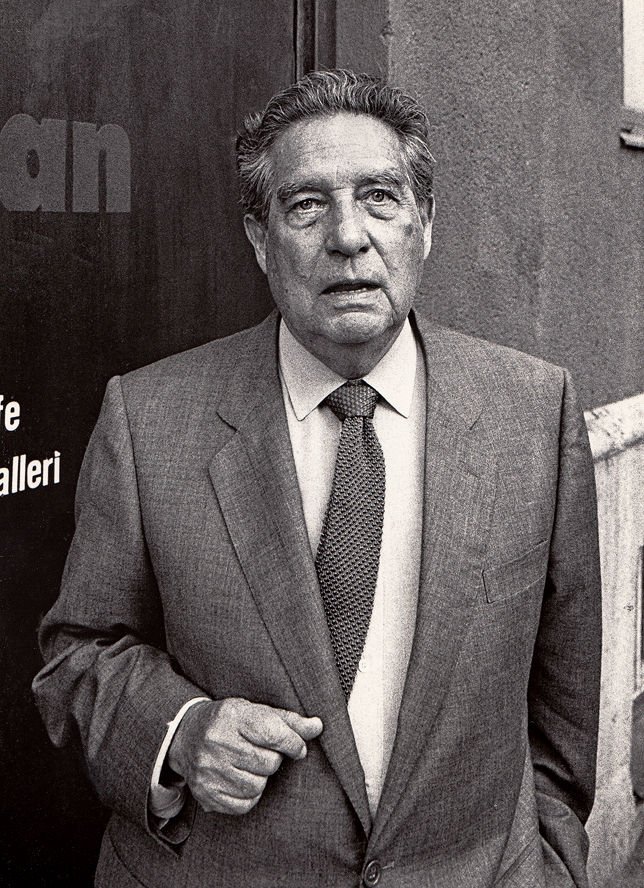
- Paz in 1988
- Born: Octavio Paz Lozano; March 31, 1914; Mexico City, Mexico
- Died: April 19, 1998 (aged 84); Mexico City, Mexico
- Occupations: Philosopher; writer; poet; diplomat
- Spouses: Elena Garro (m. 1937; div. 1959) Marie-José Tramini (m. 1965–1998)
- Writing career
- Period: 1931–1965
- Notable awards: Miguel de Cervantes Prize (1981); Nobel Prize in Literature (1990)
- Movements: Surrealism; existentialism

Octavio Paz Lozano (Note: Spanish pronunciation: [oɣˈtaβjo pas loˈsano], audio.) (March 31, 1914 – April 19, 1998) was a Mexican philosopher, poet, and diplomat. For his body of work, he was awarded the 1977 Jerusalem Prize, the 1981 Miguel de Cervantes Prize, the 1982 Neustadt International Prize for Literature, and the 1990 Nobel Prize in Literature.

== Early life ==
Octavio Paz was born near Mexico City. His family was a prominent liberal political family in Mexico, with Spanish and indigenous Mexican roots. His grandfather, Ireneo Paz, the family's patriarch, fought in the War of the Reform against conservatives, and then became a staunch supporter of liberal war hero Porfirio Díaz up until just before the 1910 outbreak of the Mexican Revolution. Ireneo Paz became an intellectual and journalist, starting several newspapers, where he was publisher and printer. Ireneo's son, Octavio Paz Solórzano, supported Emiliano Zapata during the Revolution, and published an early biography of him and the Zapatista movement. Octavio was named after his father but spent much of his childhood with his grandfather Ireneo, as his namesake father was active in the Mexican Revolution. His father later died violently. The family experienced financial ruin after the Mexican Revolution; they briefly relocated to Los Angeles, before returning to Mexico. Paz had blue eyes and was often mistaken for a foreigner by other children—according to a biography written by his long-time associate, historian Enrique Krauze, when Zapatista revolutionary Antonio Díaz Soto y Gama met young Octavio, he said, "Caramba, you didn't tell me you had a Visigoth for a son!" Krauze quotes Paz as saying, "I felt myself Mexican but they wouldn't let me be one."

Paz was introduced to literature early in his life through the influence of his grandfather Ireneo's library, filled with classic Mexican and European literature. During the 1920s, he discovered Gerardo Diego, Juan Ramón Jiménez, and Antonio Machado; these Spanish writers had a great influence on his early writings.

As a teenager in 1931, Paz published his first poems, including "Cabellera". Two years later, at the age of nineteen, he published Luna Silvestre (Wild Moon), a collection of poems. Between those publications, in 1932 at the age of 18, he founded his first literary review, Barandal with some friends.

For a few years, Paz studied law and literature at National University of Mexico. During this time, he became familiar with leftist poets, such as Chilean Pablo Neruda. In 1936, Paz abandoned his law studies, and left Mexico City for Yucatán to work at a school in Mérida. The school was set up for the sons of peasants and workers. There, he began working on the first of his long, ambitious poems, "Entre la piedra y la flor" ("Between the Stone and the Flower," 1941, revised 1976); influenced by the work of T. S. Eliot, it explores the situation of the Mexican peasant under the domineering landlords of the day.

In July 1937, he attended the Second International Writers' Congress—the purpose of which was to discuss the attitude of intellectuals to the war in Spain—held in Valencia, Barcelona and Madrid and attended by many writers, including André Malraux, Ernest Hemingway, Stephen Spender, and Pablo Neruda. Paz showed his solidarity with the Republican side, and against the fascists led by Francisco Franco. While in Europe he also visited Paris, where he encountered the surrealist movement, which left a profound impact upon him. After his return to Mexico, in 1938 Paz co-funded a literary journal, Taller ("Workshop") and wrote for that magazine until 1941. In 1937 he married Elena Garro, considered to be one of Mexico's finest writers; they had met in 1935. They had one daughter, Helena, and were divorced in 1959.

In 1943, Paz received a Guggenheim Fellowship and used it to study at the University of California at Berkeley in the United States. Two years later, he entered the Mexican diplomatic service, and was assigned for a time to New York City. In 1945, he was sent to Paris, where he wrote El Laberinto de la Soledad (The Labyrinth of Solitude); The New York Times later described it as "an analysis of modern Mexico and the Mexican personality in which he described his fellow countrymen as instinctive nihilists who hide behind masks of solitude and ceremoniousness." In 1952, he travelled to India for the first time, and that same year went to Tōkyō as chargé d'affaires. He next was assigned to Geneva, Switzerland. He returned to Mexico City in 1954, where he wrote his great poem "Piedra de sol" ("Sunstone") in 1957, and published Libertad bajo palabra (Liberty under Oath), a compilation of his poetry up to that time. He was again sent to Paris in 1959, and in 1962, he was named Mexico's ambassador to India.

== Later life ==
In New Delhi, as Ambassador of Mexico to India, Paz completed several works, including El mono gramático (The Monkey Grammarian) and Ladera este (Eastern Slope). While in India, he met numerous writers of a group known as the Hungry Generation and had a profound influence on them.

In 1965, he married Marie-José Tramini, a French woman who would be his wife for the rest of his life. That fall, he went to Cornell University and taught two courses, one in Spanish and the other in English—the magazine LIFE en Español published a piece, illustrated with several pictures, about his tenure there in their July 4, 1966 issue. He subsequently returned to Mexico.

In 1968, Paz resigned from the diplomatic service in protest against the Mexican government's massacre of student demonstrators in Tlatelolco; after seeking refuge in Paris, he again returned to Mexico in 1969, where he founded his magazine Plural (1970–1976) with a group of liberal Mexican and Latin American writers. From 1969 to 1970, Paz was Simón Bolívar Professor at the University of Cambridge. He was also a visiting lecturer during the late 1960s, and the A. D. White Professor-at-Large from 1972 to 1974 at Cornell. In 1974, he was the Charles Eliot Norton Professor of Poetry at Harvard University; his book Los hijos del limo (Children of the Mire) was the result of his lectures. After the Mexican government closed Plural in 1975, Paz founded Vuelta, another cultural magazine. He was editor of that until his death in 1998, when the magazine closed.

Paz won the 1977 Jerusalem Prize for literature on the theme of individual freedom. In 1980, he was awarded an honorary doctorate from Harvard, and in 1982, he won the Neustadt Prize. Once good friends with novelist Carlos Fuentes, Paz became estranged from him in the 1980s in a disagreement over the Sandinistas, whom Paz opposed and Fuentes supported.; in 1988, Paz's magazine Vuelta published criticism of Fuentes by Enrique Krauze, resulting in the estrangement.

A collection of Paz's poems (written between 1957 and 1987) was published in 1990, and in that year, he was awarded the Nobel Prize in Literature.

Paz died of cancer on April 19, 1998, in Mexico City. His ashes, along with those of his spouse, Marie-José Tramini, are kept at a memorial in the Colegio de San Ildefonso in Mexico City.

Guillermo Sheridan, who in 1998 was named by Paz as director of the Octavio Paz Foundation, published a book, Poeta con paisaje (2004), with several biographical essays about the poet.

== Writings ==
A prolific author and poet, Paz published scores of works during his lifetime, many of which have been translated into other languages. His poetry has been translated into English by Samuel Beckett, Charles Tomlinson, Elizabeth Bishop, Muriel Rukeyser and Mark Strand. His early poetry was influenced by Marxism, surrealism, and existentialism, as well as religions such as Buddhism and Hinduism. His poem, "Piedra de sol" ("Sunstone"), written in 1957, was praised as a "magnificent" example of surrealist poetry in the presentation speech of his Nobel Prize.

His later poetry dealt with love and eroticism, the nature of time, and Buddhism. He also wrote poetry about his other passion, modern painting, dedicating poems to the work of Balthus, Joan Miró, Marcel Duchamp, Antoni Tàpies, Robert Rauschenberg, and Roberto Matta. As an essayist, Paz wrote on topics such as Mexican politics and economics, Aztec art, anthropology, and sexuality. His book-length essay, The Labyrinth of Solitude, delves into the minds of his countrymen, describing them as hidden behind masks of solitude; due to their history, their identity is lost between a pre-Columbian and a Spanish culture, negating either. A key work in understanding Mexican culture, the essay greatly influenced other Mexican writers, such as Carlos Fuentes. Ilan Stavans wrote that Paz was "the quintessential surveyor, a Renaissance man".

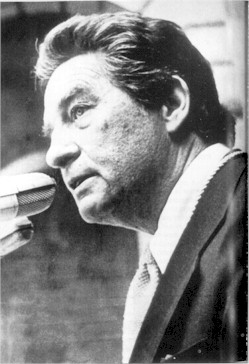
Octavio Paz

Paz wrote the play La hija de Rappaccini in 1956. The plot centers around a young Italian student who wanders about Professor Rappaccini's beautiful gardens, where he espies the professor's daughter, Beatrice. He is horrified to discover the poisonous nature of the garden's beauty. Paz adapted the play from an 1844 short story by American writer Nathaniel Hawthorne, which was also entitled "Rappaccini's Daughter"; he combined Hawthorne's story with sources from the Indian poet Vishakadatta and influences from Japanese Noh theatre, Spanish autos sacramentales, and the poetry of William Butler Yeats. The play's opening performance was designed by the Mexican painter Leonora Carrington. In 1972, Surrealist author André Pieyre de Mandiargues translated the play into French as La fille de Rappaccini (Editions Mercure de France). First performed in English in 1996 at the Gate Theatre in London, the play was translated and directed by Sebastian Doggart and starred Sarah Alexander as Beatrice. The Mexican composer Daniel Catán adapted the play as an opera in 1992.

Paz's other works translated into English include several volumes of essays, some of the more prominent of which are Alternating Current (tr. 1973), Configurations (tr. 1971), in the UNESCO Collection of Representative Works, The Other Mexico (tr. 1972); and El Arco y la Lira (1956; tr. The Bow and the Lyre, 1973). In the United States, Helen Lane's translation of Alternating Current won a National Book Award. Along with these are volumes of critical studies and biographies, including of Claude Lévi-Strauss and Marcel Duchamp (both, tr. 1970), and The Traps of Faith, an analytical biography of Sor Juana Inés de la Cruz, the Mexican, seventeenth-century nun, feminist poet, mathematician, and thinker.

Paz's works include the poetry collections ¿Águila o sol? (1951), La Estación Violenta, (1956), Piedra de Sol (1957). In English, Early Poems: 1935–1955 (tr. 1974) and Collected Poems, 1957–1987 (1987) have been edited and translated by Eliot Weinberger, Paz's principal translator into American English. "The poetry of Octavio Paz", wrote the critic Ramón Xirau, "does not hesitate between language and silence; it leads into the realm of silence where true language lives."

== Political thought ==
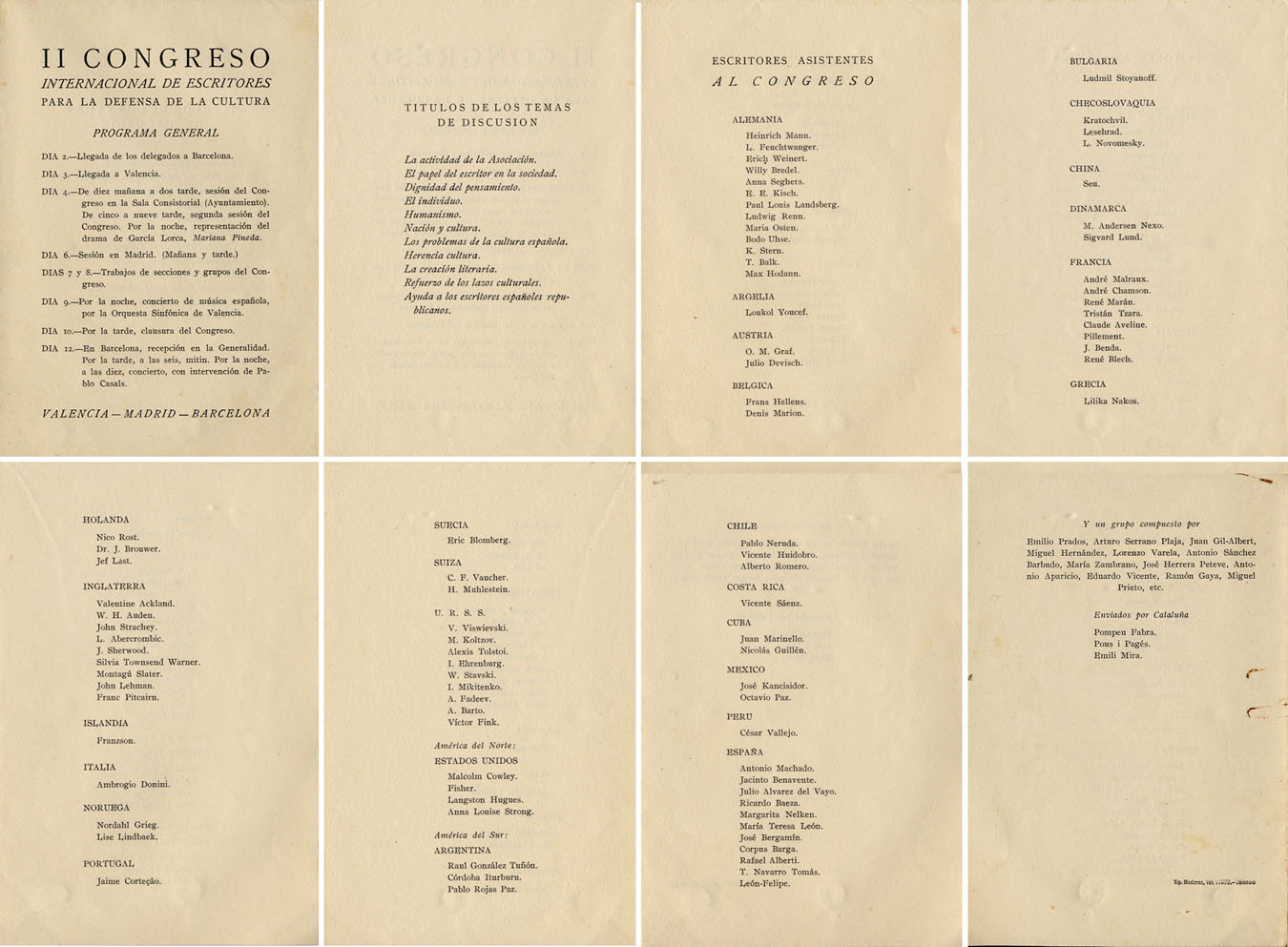
II International Congress of Writers for the Defense of Culture

Originally, Paz supported the Republicans during the Spanish Civil War, but after learning of the murder of one of his friends by the Stalinist secret police, he became gradually disillusioned. While in Paris in the early 1950s, influenced by David Rousset, André Breton and Albert Camus, he started publishing his critical views on totalitarianism in general, and particularly against Joseph Stalin, leader of the Soviet Union.

In his magazines Plural and Vuelta, Paz exposed the violations of human rights in Communist regimes, including Castro's Cuba. This elicited much animosity from sectors of the Latin American Left: in the prologue to Volume IX of his complete works, Paz stated that from the time when he abandoned Communist dogma, the mistrust of many in the Mexican intelligentsia started to transform into an intense and open enmity. Paz continued to consider himself a man of the left—the democratic, "liberal" left, not the dogmatic and illiberal one. He also criticized the Mexican government and leading party that dominated the nation for most of the twentieth century.

Politically, Paz was a social democrat, who became increasingly supportive of liberal ideas without ever renouncing his initial leftist and romantic views. In fact, Paz was "very slippery for anyone thinking in rigid ideological categories," Yvon Grenier wrote in his book on Paz's political thought. "Paz was simultaneously a romantic who spurned materialism and reason, a liberal who championed freedom and democracy, a conservative who respected tradition, and a socialist who lamented the withering of fraternity and equality. An advocate of fundamental transformation in the way we see ourselves and modern society, Paz was also a promoter of incremental change, not revolution."

There can be no society without poetry, but society can never be realized as poetry, it is never poetic. Sometimes the two terms seek to break apart. They cannot.

— Octavio Paz

In 1990, during the aftermath of the fall of the Berlin wall, Paz and his Vuelta colleagues invited several of the world's writers and intellectuals to Mexico City to discuss the collapse of Communism; writers included Czesław Miłosz, Hugh Thomas, Daniel Bell, Ágnes Heller, Cornelius Castoriadis, Hugh Trevor-Roper, Jean-François Revel, Michael Ignatieff, Mario Vargas Llosa, Jorge Edwards and Carlos Franqui. The encounter was called The Experience of Freedom (Spanish: La experiencia de la libertad), and broadcast on Mexican television from 27 August to 2 September.

Paz said that the literature on Spanish and Portuguese colonialism is biased and "is full of somber details and harsh judgments". He said that there were also immense gains:

"Not all was horror: over the ruins of the pre-Columbian world the Spanish and Portuguese raised a grandiose historical construction, much of which is still in place. They united many peoples who spoke different languages, worshiped different gods, fought among themselves, or were ignorant of one another. These peoples became united by laws and judicial institutions, but, above all, by language, culture, and religion. Although the losses were enormous, the gains were immense. To measure fairly the effect of the Spanish in Mexico, one must emphasize that without them—that is, without the Catholic religion and the culture the Spanish implanted in our country—we would not be what we are. We would probably be a collection of peoples divided by different beliefs, languages, and cultures."

Paz criticized the Zapatista uprising in 1994. He spoke broadly in favor of a "military solution" to the uprising of January 1994, and hoped that the "army would soon restore order in the region". With respect to President Zedillo's offensive in February 1995, he signed an open letter that described the offensive as a "legitimate government action" to re-establish the "sovereignty of the nation" and to bring "Chiapas peace and Mexicans tranquility".

=== First literary experiences ===
Paz was dazzled by The Waste Land by T. S. Eliot, in Enrique Munguia's translation as El Páramo which was published in the magazine Contemporaries in 1930. As a result of this, although he maintained his primary interest in poetry, Paz also had an unavoidable outlook on prose: "Literally, this dual practice was for me a game of reflections between poetry and prose".

Worried about confirming the existence of a link between morals and poetry, in 1931, at the age of sixteen, he wrote what would be his first published article, "Ethics of the Artist", in which he posed the question of the duty of an artist among what would be deemed "art of thesis," or pure art, which disqualifies the second as a result of the teaching of tradition. Employing language that resembles a religious style and, paradoxically, a Marxist one, Paz finds the true value of art in its purpose and meaning, for which the followers of pure art—of whom he is not one—are found in an isolated position and favor the Kantian idea of the "man that loses all relation with the world".

The magazine Barandal appeared in August 1931, put together by Rafael López Malo, Salvador Toscano, Arnulfo Martínez Lavalle and Paz; all of them were not yet in their youth, except for Salvador Toscano, who was a renowned writer thanks to his parents. Rafael López participated in the magazine "Modern" and, along with Miguel D. Martínez Rendón, in the movimiento de los agoristas, although it was more commented on and known by high-school students, over all for his poem, "The Golden Beast". Octavio Paz Solórzano became known in his circle as the occasional author of literary narratives that appeared in the Sunday newspaper add-in El Universal, as well as Ireneo Paz which was the name that gave a street in Mixcoac identity.

== Awards ==
- Inducted Member of Colegio Nacional, Mexican highly selective academy of arts and sciences 1967
- Peace Prize of the German Book Trade
- National Prize for Arts and Sciences (Mexico) in Literature 1977
- Honorary Doctorate National Autonomous University of Mexico 1978
- Honorary Doctorate (Harvard University) 1980
- Ollin Yoliztli Prize 1980
- Miguel de Cervantes Prize 1981
- Nobel Prize in Literature in 1990
- Grand Officer of the Order of Merit of the Italian Republic 1991
- Premio Mondello (Palermo, Italy)
- Alfonso Reyes International Prize
- Neustadt International Prize for Literature 1982
- Jerusalem Prize
- Menéndez Pelayo International Prize
- Prix Alexis de Tocqueville, 1989
- Xavier Villaurrutia Award

== Works ==
=== Poetry collections ===
- 1933: Luna silvestre
- 1936: No pasarán!
- 1937: Raíz del hombre
- 1937: Bajo tu clara sombra y otros poemas sobre España
- 1941: Entre la piedra y la flor
- 1942: A la orilla del mundo, compilation
- 1949: Libertad bajo palabra
- 1954: Semillas para un himno
- 1957: Piedra de Sol (Sunstone)
- 1958: La estación violenta
- 1962: Salamandra (1958–1961)
- 1965: Viento entero
- 1967: Blanco
- 1968: Discos visuales
- 1969: Ladera Este (1962–1968)
- 1969: La centena (1935–1968)
- 1971: Topoemas
- 1972: Renga: A Chain of Poems with Jacques Roubaud, Edoardo Sanguineti and Charles Tomlinson
- 1974: El mono gramático
- 1975: Pasado en claro
- 1976: Vuelta
- 1979: Hijos del aire/Airborn with Charles Tomlinson
- 1979: Poemas (1935–1975)
- 1985: Prueba del nueve
- 1985: Lectura y contemplación (essay on translation)
- 1987: Árbol adentro (1976–1987)
- 1989: El fuego de cada día, selection, preface and notes by Paz

=== Anthology ===
- 1966: Poesía en movimiento (México: 1915–1966), edition by Octavio Paz, Alí Chumacero, Homero Aridjis and Jose Emilio Pacheco

=== Essays and analysis ===
- 1950: El laberinto de la soledad: Vida y pensamiento de México (Published in English in 1961 as The Labyrinth of Solitude: Life and Thought in Mexico)
- 1956 - El arco y la lira (edición revisada y aumentada: 1967)
- 1957 - Las peras del olmo
- 1965 - Cuadrivio
- 1965 - Los signos en rotación
- 1966 - Puertas al campo
- 1967 - Corriente alterna
- 1967 - Claude Levi-Strauss o El nuevo festín de Esopo
- 1968 - Marcel Duchamp o El castillo de la pureza (edición aumentada: Apariencia desnuda, 1973)
- 1969 - Conjunciones y disyunciones
- 1970 - Posdata, continuación de El laberinto de la soledad.
- 1973 - El signo y el garabato
- 1974 - Los hijos del limo. Del romanticismo a la vanguardia
- 1974 - La búsqueda del comienzo. Escritos sobre el surrealismo
- 1978 - Xavier Villaurrutia en persona y obra
- 1979 - El ogro filantrópico
- 1979 - In/Mediaciones
- 1982 - Sor Juana Inés de la Cruz o las trampas de la fe
- 1983 - Tiempo nublado
- 1983 - Sombras de obras
- 1984 - Hombres en su siglo y otros ensayos
- 1988 - Primeras letras (1931-1943) (antología de sus prosas de juventud)
- 1990 - Pequeña crónica de grandes días
- 1990 - La otra voz. Poesía y fin de siglo
- 1991 - Convergencias
- 1992 - Al paso
- 1993 - La llama doble
- 1993 - Itinerario
- 1994 - Un más allá erótico: Sade
- 1995 - Vislumbres de la India
- 1996 - Estrella de tres puntas. André Bretón y el surrealismo
- 2000 - Luis Buñuel. El doble arco de la belleza y de la rebeldía

=== Translations by Octavio Paz ===
- 1957: Sendas de Oku, by Matsuo Bashō, translated in collaboration with Eikichi Hayashiya
- 1962: Antología, by Fernando Pessoa
- 1974: Versiones y diversiones (Collection of his translations of a number of authors into Spanish)

=== Translations of his works ===
- 1952: Anthologie de la poésie mexicaine, edition and introduction by Octavio Paz; translated into French by Guy Lévis-Mano
- 1958: Anthology of Mexican Poetry, edition and introduction by Octavio Paz; translated into English by Samuel Beckett
- 1971: Configurations, translated by G. Aroul (and others)
- 1973: Early Poems 1935-1955; with English translations by Muriel Rukeyser
- 1974: The Monkey Grammarian (El mono gramático); translated into English by Helen Lane
- 1987: Collected Poems 1957-1987; with English translations by Eliot Weinberger
- 1995: The Double Flame (La Llama Double, Amor y Erotismo); translated by Helen Lane
- 1997: In Light of India (Vislumbres de la India); translated by Eliot Weinberger.
