= Laura Piña Olmedo =

Mexican politician

- Born: 31 December 1959 (age 66); Mexico City, Mexico
- Occupation: Politician
- Political party: PRD

Laura Piña Olmedo (born 31 December 1959) is a Mexican politician from the Party of the Democratic Revolution (PRD). From 2006 to 2009 she held a seat on the Assembly of Representatives of the Federal District and from 2009 to 2012 she served as a federal deputy in the 61st Congress, representing the Federal District's eleventh district for the PRD.
