= Jaime Aguilar Álvarez =

Mexican politician (1938–2019)

- Born: 4 August 1938; Tlaxcala, Mexico
- Died: 16 October 2019 (aged 81)
- Occupation: Politician
- Political party: PRI

Jaime Aguilar Álvarez y Mazarrasa (4 August 1938 – 16 October 2019) was a Mexican politician from the Institutional Revolutionary Party (PRI). He was elected to the Chamber of Deputies on three occasions: in 1976, for the Federal District's 11th congressional district; in 1985, for the Federal District's 10th congressional district; and in 2009, as the substitute of plurinominal deputy Beatriz Paredes of the fourth electoral region. He also served in the Legislative Assembly of the Federal District from 2003 to 2006.

He died in 2019.
