= Ireneo Paz =

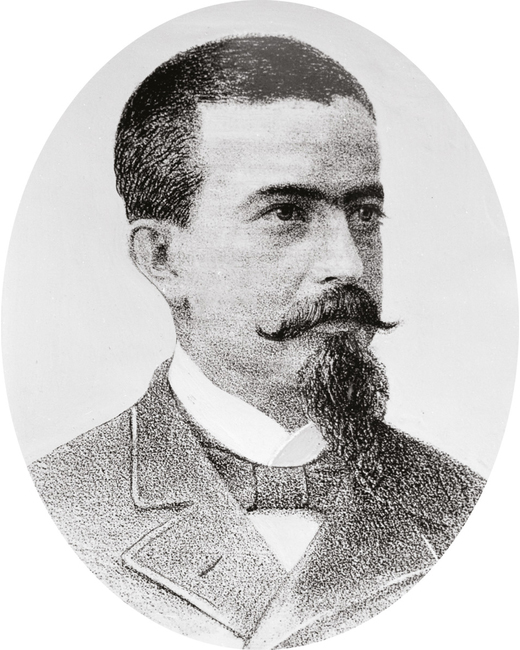
Ireneo Paz ca. 1870.

Ireneo Paz Flores (7 February 1836 – 11 April 1924) was a Mexican liberal intellectual, writer and journalist, who was the grandfather of the Nobel Prize–winning writer Octavio Paz.

Paz Flores was born on 7 February 1836 in Guadalajara, Jalisco. In 1863 upon completion of his college studies, he was licensed to practice law. He married Rosa Solórzano. Their children included: Octavio, Arturo, and Amalia. During his tenure as editor of La Patria Ilustrada, he became the first regular employer of famed cartoonist José Guadalupe Posada. He died in Mixcoac on 11 April 1924.

Paz wrote 35 books which included different genres such as fiction, play-writing, comedy, memoirs and poetry. Among his numerous writings were works on the legendary California bandit Joaquin Murrieta, and the historical figure Malinche.

Even though Ireneo Paz died when Octavio Paz was ten years old, he and his library had an important influence on his decision for being a writer.
