= Roberto Colín Gamboa =

Mexican politician

Member of the Chamber of Deputies for the Federal District's 10th district
- In office 1 September 2003 – 31 August 2006
- Preceded by: Mauricio Candiani
- Succeeded by: María Gabriela González

Personal details
- Born: 27 September 1956 (age 69) Mexico City, Mexico
- Party: PAN
- Education: IPN
- Occupation: Politician

Roberto Colín Gamboa (born 27 September 1956) is a Mexican politician affiliated with the National Action Party (PAN). In 2003–2006 he served as a federal deputy in the 59th Congress, representing the Federal District's tenth district for the PAN.
