= Partido Nacional Agrarista =

The Partido Nacional Agrarista (PNA; commonly translated as the National Agrarian Party) was a Mexican political party founded in the aftermath of the 1910–1917 Revolution. Chiefly concerned with agrarianism and the land rights of campesino farmers, it was in existence from 1920 to 1929.

== History ==
A call for the creation of a new party was issued on 1 June 1920 by a group of revolutionaries, including Antonio Díaz Soto y Gama, José Vasconcelos, Gildardo Magaña, Antonio I. Villarreal, Plutarco Elías Calles, Francisco J. Múgica, Eulalio Gutiérrez, Enrique Estrada and Saturnino Cedillo. The PNA was founded on 13 June 1920 under the leadership of Díaz Soto y Gama, a former Magonista and Zapatista who served as the party's first president. Its declared goals were the consummation of agrarian reform and the pursuit of the ideals of Emiliano Zapata.

In the general election of 5 September 1920, which saw Álvaro Obregón elected president, the PNA won seven seats in the Chamber of Deputies:

- Antonio Díaz Soto y Gama, for San Luis Potosí's 2nd district
- Vito Alessio Robles, for the Federal District's 4th
- Juan de Dios Bojórquez, for Sonora's 2nd
- Felipe Carrillo Puerto, for Yucatán's 1st
- Octavio Paz Solórzano, for the Federal District's 10th
- Emilio Portes Gil, for Tamaulipas's 4th
- Basilio Vadillo, for Jalisco's 19th

The PNA supported President Obregón in exchange for his commitment to support the redistribution of land, even though he favoured a less radical and more gradual approach. The party's demands were largely met through the intervention of Antonio I. Villarreal, Obregón's secretary of agriculture, and the adoption of the 1922 Agrarian Regulations (Reglamento Agrario) that aimed to resolve the problem of ejido land tenure and provide guarantees for small and medium-size land holdings. In 1922, the PNA also allied itself with the Mexican Labourist Party (PLM) to secure a majority in Congress to the detriment of the Constitutionalist Liberal Party (PLC), which had distanced itself from Obregón.

In 1923, several leading figures – including Gildardo Magaña and Andrés Molina Enríquez – abandoned the party, accusing Díaz Soto of being more interested in winning seats than securing land-tenure rights. The PNA backed Plutarco Elías Calles for president in the 1924 general election but, once elected, Calles came into conflict with Díaz Soto over the latter's rejection of the Pani Amendment to the 1922 De la Huerta–Lamont Treaty, intended to restructure the country's post-Revolution debts. Tensions between the PNA and the president worsened over the remainder of Calles's term.

The PNA backed Obregón's re-election in the 1928 general election but the president-elect's assassination on 17 July 1928 was the beginning of the end for the party. In an interview with a U.S. newspaper, Díaz Soto directly accused Calles's ally Luis N. Morones of the PLM of having masterminded the killing. During the early years of the Maximato – when Calles continued to pull the government's strings through a series of puppet presidents – the party refused to condemn the 1929 rebellion of José Gonzalo Escobar or to merge with Calles's newly created National Revolutionary Party (PNR). In response, Calles manoeuvred party president Leopoldo Reynoso Díaz into expelling Díaz Soto y Gama and sent a group of Labourist Party members to occupy the PNA's offices. The PNA's existence came to an end with its absorption by the PNR in 1929.
