= Agustín Barrios Gómez Segués =

Mexican politician (born 1971)

Agustín Barrios Gómez

Member of the Chamber of Deputies for the Federal District′s 10th district
- In office 1 September 2012 – 31 August 2015
- Preceded by: Gabriela Cuevas Barron
- Succeeded by: Jorge Triana Tena

Personal details
- Born: 18 March 1971 (age 55) Miguel Hidalgo, Federal District, Mexico
- Party: PRD
- Spouse: Catalina Barragan Zapata (2002-2023)
- Occupation: Deputy

Agustín Barrios Gómez Segués (born 18 March 1971) is a Mexican businessman, analyst, and speaker. In 2017 he launched International Capital Partners (ICP FUNDS), a commercial real estate investment firm. He currently serves as its president, as well as being a public speaker on issues related to international investments and asset management in North America. The fund currently services hundreds of investors across North America and has significant industrial and suburban office holdings in several cities across the United States.

== Early life ==
Gómez is the son of Mexican television personality and ambassador Agustín Barrios Gómez Méndez and Patricia Segués. In 1977, Gómez's father was appointed ambassador to Canada where the family lived until 1983 when his father was commissioned by the Mexican consulate in New York City during the Latin American debt crisis. Gómez's father was soon after appointed as ambassador to Switzerland, but Gómez remained in Canada to continue his studies. When Gómez moved to Switzerland in 1986 to join his family he attended Le Rosey Institute.

Gómez decided to return to the United States where he attended Georgetown University for international law and economics and graduated in 1993 from Georgetown's School of Foreign Service.

In 1992, Gómez was hired by Procter & Gamble. He worked for the company in marketing until 1995 when he took over his family's finances including holdings in Bar Le Barroco in Mexico. Before long, Gómez sold his interest in the club, and launched a tequila brand called Suave Patria.

== Politics ==
Gómez first entered politics in 1999 when he became advisor to Secretary of Public Security Alejandro Gertz Manero. Following his resignation as advisor, Gómez directed the political radio program Centro de Contraste for Grupo Radio Centro. In 2003, he unsuccessfully ran for Mayor of Miguel Hidalgo.

Gómez returned to academic life and earned his master's degree from the Colegio de Abogados de Madrid in 2005.

Gómez was elected Federal Deputy of District 10, Miguel Hidalgo for the PRD in 2012. In his position as Federal Deputy, he participated in commissions for several departments including Foreign Affairs.

== Public speaking and advocacy ==
In parallel to his political career Gómez has been involved in several business and international affairs organizations. He is a founding member of the Mexican Council on Foreign Relations (COMEXI). He has also been involved with the Association of Mexican Entrepreneurs and he is currently president of the Image Foundation of Mexico.

As part of his work with the Image Foundation of Mexico and COMEXI, Gómez has spoken to media outlets and organizations in opposition to the Mexican border wall proposed by President Trump. In early 2017, Gómez conducted a series of interviews in Canada warning that renegotiation of NAFTA and Mexican exclusion from North American trade would have negative consequences for both countries. Gómez also suggested that the Canadian government should make no attempt to appease American policy makers for short-term gain. Gómez has also spoken to American audiences in an effort to compel business communities to debunk anti-Mexican rhetoric and warned that blocking transit across the Mexican-American border would lead to labor shortages. Additionally, Gómez has expressed in interviews that restricting trade between the US and Mexico would threaten a large number American jobs, the economies of many states, and destabilize Mexico leading to national security concerns for the US.

== Personal life ==
Gómez married Catalina Barragan Zapata in 2002. They have one daughter together.
