= Solórzano (surname) =

Solórzano or Solorzano is a Spanish French Basque surname that may refer to:

- Alonso de Castillo Solórzano (1584–1647), Spanish novelist and playwright
- Amalia Solórzano (1911–2008), the First Lady of Mexico from 1934 to 1940
- Ana Beatriz Martínez Solórzano (born 1946), Mexican actress, singer producer and former model
- Bianca Solorzano (born 1974), correspondent for CBS News in New York
- Carlos José Solórzano (1860–1936), the President of Nicaragua between 1925 and 1926
- Carlos Solórzano (1919–2011), Guatemalan born Mexican playwright
- Cuauhtemoc Cardenas Solorzano (born 1934), prominent Mexican politician
- David Solórzano (born 1980), Nicaraguan footballer
- Delsa Solórzano (born 1971), Venezuelan politician
- Elmar Díaz Solórzano (born 1969), Mexican politician affiliated to the Institutional Revolutionary Party
- Erasmo Solórzano (born 1985), Mexican soccer player
- Fernando Guzmán Solórzano (1812–1891), the President of Nicaragua from 1867 to 1871
- Fernando Solórzano (1863-1925), Vice President of Nicaragua from 1913 to 1917
- Fidel Solórzano (born 1962), retired male athlete from Ecuador who competed in long jump and decathlon
- Javier Solórzano, journalist in México
- Jean Carlos Solórzano (born 1988), Costa Rican football forward
- José de Grimaldo y Gutiérrez de Solorzano (1660–1733), Spanish statesmen
- Leopoldo José Brenes Solórzano (born 1949), Nicaraguan cardinal of the Roman Catholic Church
- Lissette Solorzano, professional photographer born in Santiago de Cuba in 1969
- Nelson Solórzano (born 1959), Venezuelan former basketball player who competed in the 1992 Summer Olympics

== See also ==
- Solórzano, municipality in Cantabria, Spain
- Emilia Solórzano Alfaro (1835–1882), the First Lady of Costa Rica during the periods of 1870–1876 and 1877–1882
- Camila Solórzano Ayusa (born 1989), Argentine beauty pageant titleholder who was crowned Miss Argentina 2012
- Juan de Solórzano Pereira (1575–1655), Spanish jurist, oidor of Lima, early writer on the native law of South America
- Solano (disambiguation)
- Sorzano
- Lozano (disambiguation)
