= Jorge Triana Tena =

Mexican politician

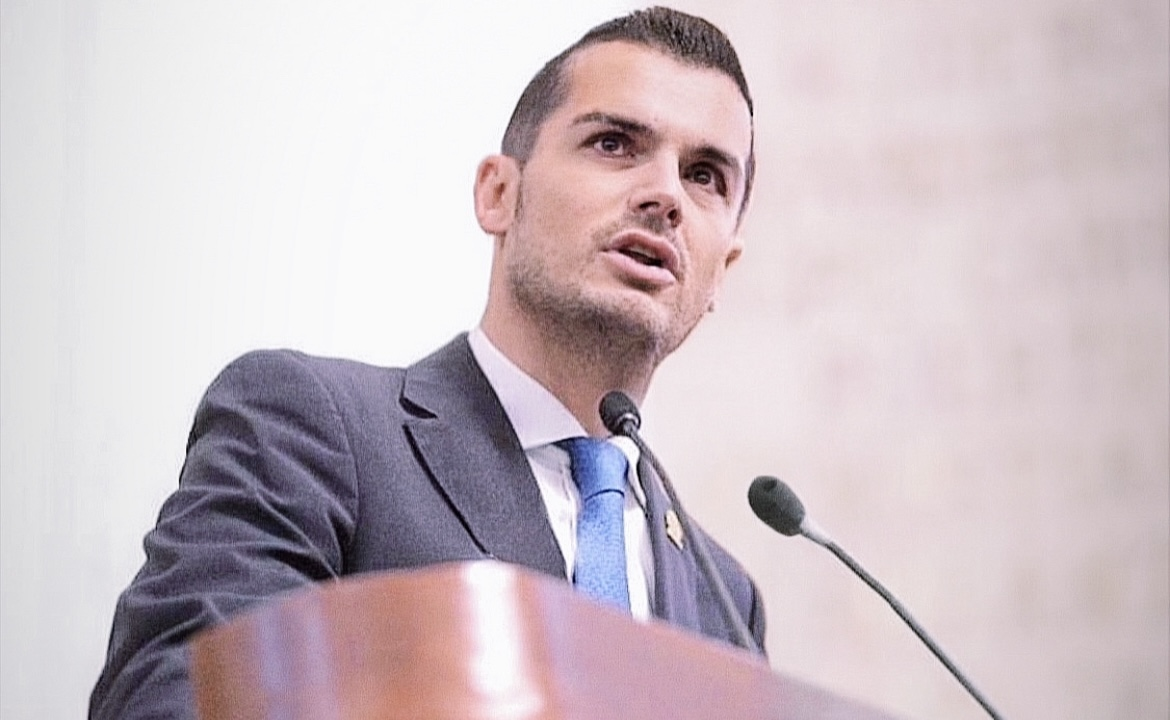
Triana in 2021

Jorge Triana Tena (born September 8, 1979) is a Mexican politician affiliated to the PAN. From 2015 to 2018 he served as a deputy representing the tenth federal electoral district of Mexico City in the LXIII Legislature of the Mexican Congress. He was re-elected to the Chamber of Deputies in 2021, representing Mexico City's seventeenth district for the PAN.

== Life ==
Triana was born in Mexico City and received his undergraduate degree in law from the Instituto Tecnológico Autónomo de México in 2001; he would also get a master's degree in public policy from the same institution.

In 1996, Triana joined the PAN and coordinated university students in the lead-up to the 1997 Mexico City mayoral elections. From 1999 to 2001, he was the coordinator general of the party's local Secretariat of Youth Action.

In 2000, he was the director general of social development, administering welfare programs in the borough of Miguel Hidalgo. He oversaw the borough's investment in the "Beacons of Learning" (Faros del Saber) program, which established a modern network of libraries in the city; three were opened in the borough during his time in the office. He also advanced in the PAN, serving as the coordinator of national relations for the national PAN Secretariat of Youth Action.

Voters elected Triana via proportional representation to the Chamber of Deputies for the LIX Legislature in 2003. He was the secretary of the Special Commission for State Reform and sat on the Youth and Sports and Federal District Commissions. He also represented the legislature as a whole before the Federal Electoral Institute and was a national councilor for the PAN between 2004 and 2007.

In 2006, Triana moved from San Lázaro to the Legislative Assembly of the Federal District in its IV Legislature. He was the vice coordinator of the PAN parliamentary group in that legislature and presided over the Commission of Political-Electoral Matters, in addition to sitting on three commissions and two committees. At the same time, he sat on the editorial board of the City section of the Reforma newspaper.

Between 2009 and 2011, he served as a federal metropolitan delegate to the Secretariat of Economy, and from 2011 to 2013, he headed the Unit of Federal Relations in SEGOB's Subsecretary of Government, where he handled relations between the federal government and states, cities, electoral bodies and political parties. At this time, he also became involved in City Manager Mexico Holding, of which he was director general between 2013 and 2015.

Voters in the tenth district returned Triana to San Lázaro in the 2015 elections, during which term he served as the president of the Commission for Rules and Parliamentary Practices and sat on the Government and Metropolitan Development Commissions.
