= Víctor Hugo García Rodríguez =

Mexican politician

- Born: 9 August 1965 (age 60); Mexico City, Mexico
- Occupation: Politician
- Political party: PRD

Víctor Hugo García Rodríguez (born 9 August 1965) is a Mexican politician affiliated with the Party of the Democratic Revolution (PRD). In 2006–2009 he served as a federal deputy in the 60th Congress, representing the Federal District's eleventh district for the PRD.
