= Padre Lozano =

Coordinates: 23°12′S 63°50′W

- Municipality and village
- Interactive map of Padre Lozano
- Country: Argentina
- Province: Salta Province
- Time zone: UTC−3 (ART)

Padre Lozano is a village and rural municipality in Salta Province in northwestern Argentina.
