= Cuauhtémoc Velasco Oliva =

Mexican politician

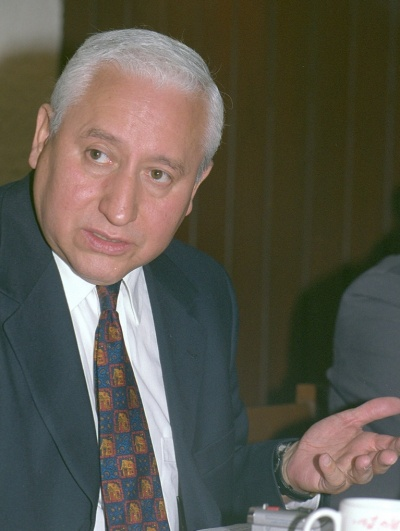
- Born: 8 June 1945 (age 81); Mexico City, Mexico
- Education: National Autonomous University of Mexico
- Occupation: Politician
- Political party: MC

Cuauhtémoc Velasco Oliva (born 8 June 1945) is a Mexican politician from the Citizens' Movement. He has served as a federal deputy on two occasions:

- 1997–2000 (57th Congress), representing the Federal District's tenth district for the Party of the Democratic Revolution.
- 2006–2009 (60th Congress), as a plurinominal deputy representing the third electoral region for Convergencia (as the Citizens' Movement was then known).
