= Gabriela Cuevas Barron =

Mexican politician

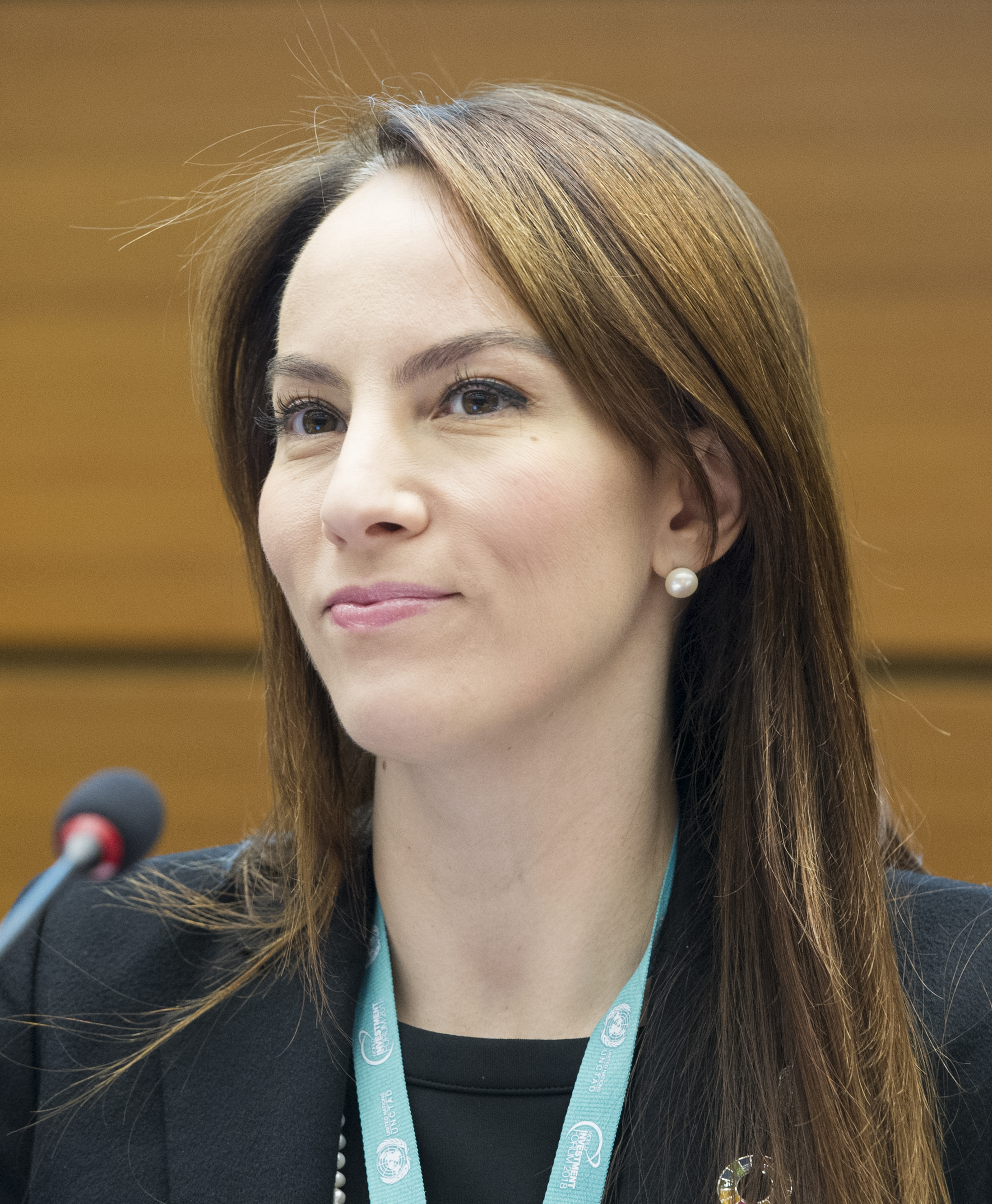
- Cuevas in 2018

Member of the Chamber of Deputies for Mexico City's Fourth District
- In office 29 August 2018 – 31 August 2021

Senate of the Republic (Mexico) LXII/LXIII Legislature
- In office 29 August 2012 – 31 August 2018

President of the Inter-Parliamentary Union
- In office 2017–2020
- Preceded by: Saber Hossain Chowdhury
- Succeeded by: pt:Duarte Pacheco (político)

Member of the Chamber of Deputies for Mexico City's Tenth District
- In office 29 August 2009 – 31 August 2012
- Preceded by: María Gabriela González Martínez
- Succeeded by: Agustín Barrios Gómez Segués

Mayor of Miguel Hidalgo, Mexico City
- In office 2006–2009
- Preceded by: es:Fernando Aboitiz
- Succeeded by: Alfredo Vinalay Mora

Congress of Mexico City
- In office 15 September 2003 – 14 September 2006

Chamber of Deputies for Mexico City's Fourth District (As Alternate) / LVIII Legislature
- In office 28 August 2000 – 31 August 2003

Personal details
- Born: 3 April 1979 (age 47) Mexico City, Mexico
- Party: National Regeneration Movement (2018–present)
- Other political affiliations: National Action Party (1995–2018); Independent (Note: Will only be an "independent" for the rest of her 2012-2018 term) (2018)

Academic background
- Education: Autonomous Technical Institute of Mexico

Academic work
- Discipline: Political science

Gabriela Cuevas Barron (born 3 April 1979) is a Mexican politician. She was the President of the Inter-Parliamentary Union from 2017 to 2020 and served as a plurinominal senator from 2012 to 2018.

She is currently Mexico's representative for the 2026 FIFA World Cup

== Personal life and education ==
Cuevas, at the age of 15, became interested in public service as a result of undertaking scholarly Catholic missionary work in and around Mexico. After getting, by her own free self, a keen eye for what she strongly felt as corruption in and out of rural and urban Mexican towns that she visited doing her school missionary work; Being just 15 years, she decided to start and continue to devote and focus her life on the merely social aspect of such a Catholic missionary work; this, by becoming active in Mexican politics as well as in, as she grew up, in several NGOs.

Cuevas Barron majored in political science at the Autonomous Technical Institute of Mexico (ITAM).

She is a second cousin to the wives of Alfredo del Mazo Maza, governor of the State of Mexico, and José Antonio Meade, the Institutional Revolutionary Party's 2018 presidential candidate.

== Political career ==
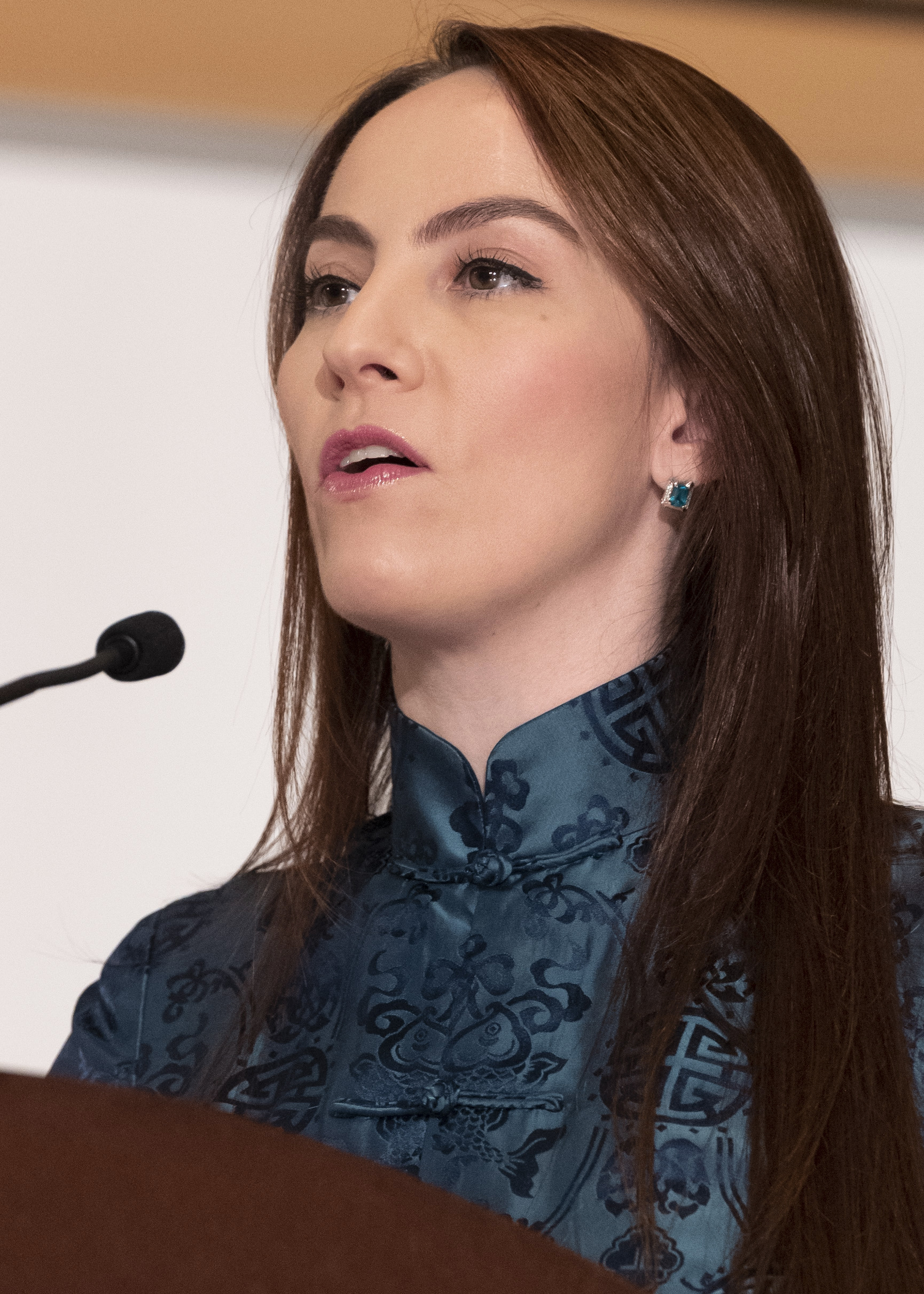
Gabriela Cuevas Barrón, President Interparliamentary Union during the Word Investment Forum 2018.

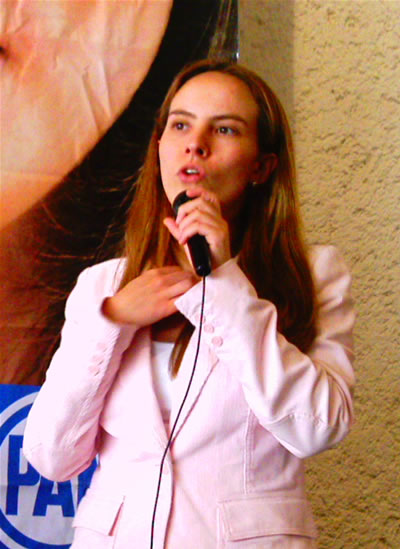
Photo of Gabriela Cuevas Barrón.

Cuevas has been an active and politically involved person and PAN member since 1994. She has occupied different positions inside her political party including head of the PAN in Mexico City's Miguel Hidalgo borough.

From 2000 to 2003 she served as an alternate federal deputy during the LVIII Legislature; then from 2003 to 2006 she served in the Legislative Assembly of the Federal District representing PAN.

In April 2005, she and another PAN deputy, Jorge Lara, paid 2,000 MXN in order to prevent Andrés Manuel López Obrador from being jailed as he would "become a martyr" had he gone to jail during his "desafuero".

In 2006 she was elected to serve as Jefe Delegacional of Miguel Hidalgo.

In 2009 she was elected as federal deputy to the LXI Legislature of the Mexican Congress, representing the Federal District's tenth district.

In 2012 she was elected as plurinominal senator to the LXII Legislature of the Mexican Congress.

On 18 October 2017, Cuevas Barron was elected as the President of the Inter-Parliamentary Union, the first female from the Americas, after formally contending with Uruguayan politician, Ivonne Passada. She was succeeded in 2020 by pt:Duarte Pacheco (político)

In January 2018, Cuevas Barron left the National Action Party to join the left-wing National Regeneration Movement (MORENA) citing that the objectives of inclusion, pluralism and development were not met. She will pose as an independent for the rest of her term as a senator, until the inauguration of the LXIV Legislature of the Mexican Congress, where she will represent MORENA. The PAN claimed she left the party since she was not guaranteed a federal deputy spot through the proportional representation process.

Since 2022, Cuevas Barron has been a member of the Commission for Universal Health convened by Chatham House and co-chaired by Helen Clark and Jakaya Kikwete.

== Other activities ==
- World Academy of Art and Science, Fellow
