= Agustín Barrios Gómez Méndez =

Mexican society columnist and diplomat

Ambassador of Mexico to Canada
- In office 1 March 1977 – 11 April 1983
- President: José López Portillo; Miguel de la Madrid
- Succeeded by: José Andrés de Oteyza

Ambassador of Mexico to Switzerland
- In office 16 April 1983 – 11 May 1987
- President: Miguel de la Madrid
- Succeeded by: Marcelo Javelly Girard

Personal details
- Born: 1925 Mexico City, Mexico
- Died: 15 March 1999 (aged 73–74) Mexico City, Mexico
- Party: Institutional Revolutionary Party
- Children: Agustín Barrios Gómez Segués
- Education: National Autonomous University of Mexico (LL B) Columbia University
- Occupation: Journalist, television commentator, diplomat

Agustín Barrios Gómez Méndez (1925 – 15 March 1999) was a Mexican society columnist, television commentator and diplomat. He wrote the society column "Ensalada Popoff" in the Mexico City newspaper Novedades and is credited with making the name "Zona Rosa" popular. He was Mexico's ambassador to Canada from 1977 to 1983 and to Switzerland from 1983 to 1987. His son is the businessman and analyst Agustín Barrios Gómez Segués.

== Early life ==
Barrios Gómez was born in Mexico City in 1925. He took a law degree at the National Autonomous University of Mexico (UNAM) and did postgraduate studies at Columbia University in New York. In 1956 he joined the Institutional Revolutionary Party (PRI).

== Journalism ==
Barrios Gómez began writing for Novedades in 1948 and was its society reporter (cronista de sociales). His column was called "Ensalada Popoff", roughly "High-Society Salad". He also wrote a column called "Circomentarios".

In the late 1950s and the 1960s, a few blocks of Colonia Juárez became the city's fashionable district of galleries, cafés, restaurants and shops. This area became known as the Zona Rosa ("Pink Zone"). While the origin of the name is disputed, the writer Luis Guillermo Piazza and painter José Luis Cuevas have both claimed it. The Enciclopedia de la Literatura en México calls Barrios Gómez the great popularizer of the name in those years, through his column. Some sources credit him with the name itself.

He won the National Journalism Prize (Premio Nacional de Periodismo) in 1974 and again in 1975. He was also the author of the book México en 1968 (1968).

== Television ==
Barrios Gómez was one of the first presenters on Mexican television. In the early 1950s he hosted Mesa de Celebridades ("Celebrities' Table") on Canal 4, an interview program with film stars; in 1953 his guests were the visitors to the Italian film week in Mexico City. In 1954 he and the documentary maker Demetrio Bilbatúa founded the production company Producciones Barrios Gómez Bilbatúa. In the 1960s he went to work for Telesistema Mexicano, later Televisa, where he made programs and documentaries. The documentaries he made with Bilbatúa were on the arts.

== Diplomatic career ==
Barrios Gómez was appointed ambassador to Canada on 1 March 1977, under President José López Portillo. He presented his credentials on 26 April 1977 and headed the embassy in Ottawa until 11 April 1983. From Ottawa he was also accredited to the Bahamas.

President Miguel de la Madrid then named him ambassador to Switzerland. He took over the embassy on 16 April 1983, five days after leaving the post in Canada, presented his credentials on 18 April and served until 11 May 1987. From 1990 to 1992 he was Mexico's consul general in New York City.

== Other activities and death ==
Barrios Gómez was one of the founders of the Museo Nacional de San Carlos in Mexico City, and a member of the Mexican Academy of International Law (Academia Mexicana de Derecho Internacional). He died in Mexico City on 15 March 1999.
