= 1949 Mexican legislative election =

Legislative elections were held in Mexico on 3 July 1949. The Institutional Revolutionary Party (PRI), a dominant party that ruled the nation under an authoritarian regime, won 142 of the 147 seats in the Chamber of Deputies. Four seats were won by the main opposition National Action Party (PAN). With little over 10,000 votes, the Popular Party (PP), which was founded the year before, won the remaining seat. The PP was considered to be a parastatal party that worked with the PRI regime.

This was the last midterm elections in which only men could vote, as women's suffrage was introduced after the 1952 general election.

== Results ==
Party	Votes	%	Seats	+/–
Institutional Revolutionary Party	2,031,783	93.91	142	+1
National Action Party	121,061	5.60	4	0
Popular Party	10,738	0.50	1	New
Total	2,163,582	100.00	147	0
Registered voters/turnout	2,992,084	–		
Source: Nohlen
