= Antonio Díaz Soto y Gama =

Mexican revolutionary (1880–1967)

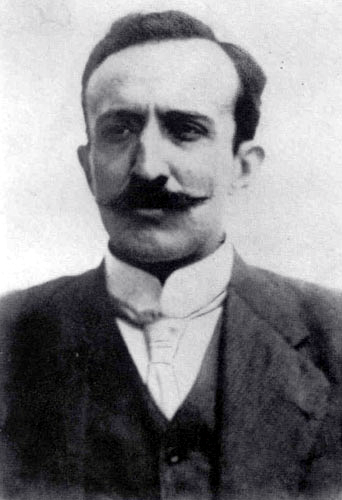
Antonio Díaz Soto y Gama

Antonio Díaz Soto y Gama (Note: In this Mexican name, the surname is Díaz Soto and the second or maternal family name is Gama.) (23 January 1880 – 14 March 1967) was a Mexican politician. He fought for Emiliano Zapata in the 1910–1917 Revolution and later served in Congress and in the cabinet of President Lázaro Cárdenas.

== Biography ==
He was born in San Luis Potosí to Conrado Díaz Soto y Gama and Concepción Cruz. He studied in San Luis Potosí, first at the Instituto de la Immaculada Concepción and later at the Instituto Literario.

During the early 1900s he was associated with Ricardo Flores Magón's anarchist Mexican Liberal Party, which was involved in strikes and uprisings in Mexico from 1906 to 1911. He was also active with the Magon brothers' newspaper El Hijo del Ahuizote. In August 1911, together with Magón he helped co-found the successor Liberal Party (Partido Liberal). He was also the secretary and vice president of the Ponciano Arriaga Liberal Club (named after the 19th-century lawyer) and was imprisoned by the regime of Porfirio Díaz for his activities, and later forced into exile in United States. While there he published a liberal newspaper in El Paso, La Reforma Social, with an editorial agenda that opposed the Díaz dictatorship.

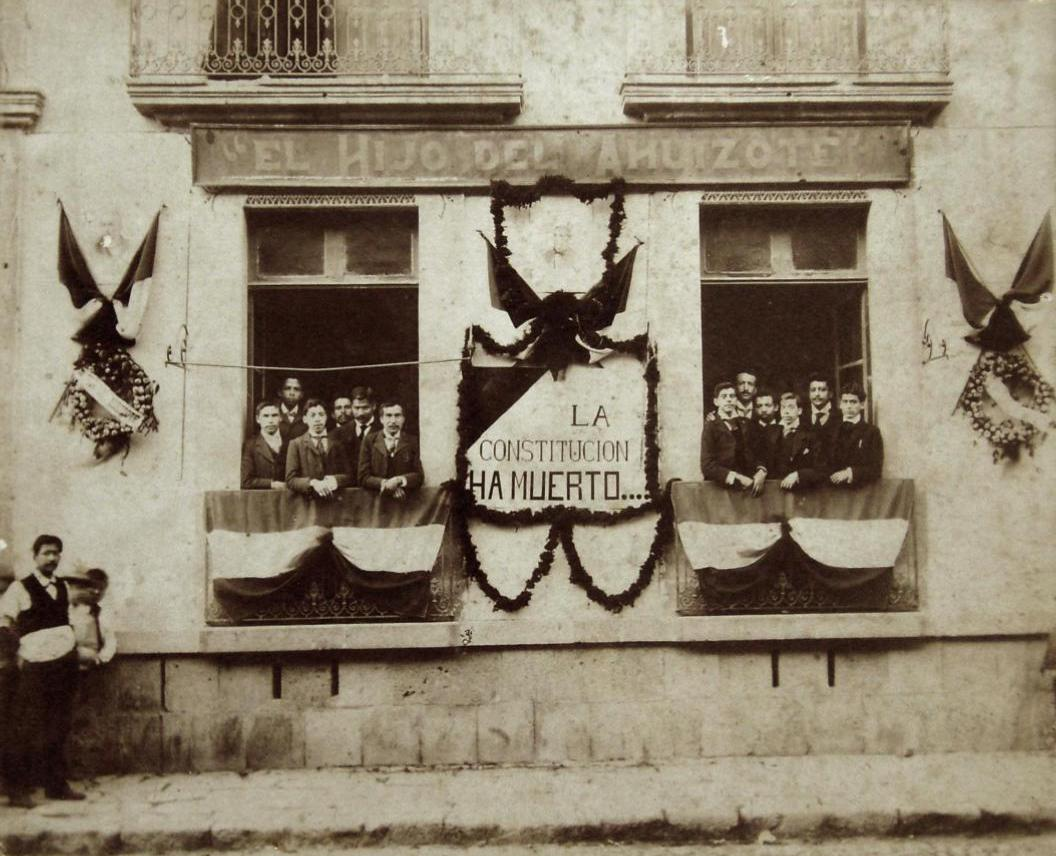
A protest at the offices of the anti-Díaz newspaper El Hijo del Ahuizote. Antonio Díaz Soto y Gama is fifth from the right in the second window. The slogan on the banner reads "The Constitution has died..."

During the presidency of Francisco I. Madero, Díaz Soto y Gama helped found the Casa del Obrero Mundial (House of the Worker of the World) in Mexico City. After Victoriano Huerta ousted Madero in the February 1913 Decena Trágica, Díaz Soto y Gama joined the movement of Emiliano Zapata.

He played a prominent role at the Convention of Aguascalientes in 1914, following Huerta's victory. During the convention, Díaz Soto's speech and disrespect for the Mexican flag, which he said symbolized the "triumph of clerical reaction", caused a protest from some of the participants, many of whom threatened him by pointing their guns at him. However, his presence at the convention contributed greatly to the adoption of the Zapatista Plan of Ayala. Since Zapata's backing came mostly from rural campesinos, Díaz Soto y Gama also served as his representative to urban workers, including the anarcho-syndicalist union Casa del Obrero Mundial.

In 1917 he came into conflict with another Zapatista chief, Otilio Montaño Sánchez, and played a role in having him executed. After Zapata's murder in 1919, Soto y Gama continued to advise Zapata's successor, Gildardo Magaña, and eventually joined the movement of Álvaro Obregón (whom Antonio called "the executor of the ideas of Emiliano Zapata") in opposition to Venustiano Carranza. Although President Obregón had asked him to serve in his cabinet as Minister of Agriculture, Díaz Soto declined.

After the revolution he was a member of the Chamber of Deputies. He was the leader of the National Agrarian Party (Partido Nacional Agrarista, PNA), which he founded on 13 June 1920. The platform of the party called for redistribution of land to peasants. As a representative of the party he served four terms in Congress between 1920 and 1928. During the presidency of Lázaro Cárdenas (1934–1940), he served in the Ministry of Agriculture, though he later lost this position in the wake of the uprising of Saturnino Cedillo.

In the late 1930s, Díaz Soto y Gama received a chair in history and agricultural law at the National Autonomous University of Mexico (UNAM) and also worked as a newspaper columnist. During this time, he became increasingly conservative, writing and campaigning in favor of right-wing candidate Juan Andreu Almazán in the 1940 presidential election, and co-founding the National Action Party (PAN). He also wrote about his time in Zapata's army, portraying Zapata as a conservative and an anti-communist. In 1948, there was a student uprising at the UNAM, led by synarchist student groups, claiming that there was a state-mandated left-slanted curriculum, and calling for Díaz Soto y Gama to become rector.

The Senate awarded him its Belisario Domínguez Medal in 1958.

He died in Mexico City in March 1967, one of the few major figures of the Mexican Revolution to have died a natural death.
