= Lozano, Jujuy =

Coordinates: 34°51′S 59°03′W

Lozano (Jujuy)
- Rural municipality and village
- Interactive map of Lozano (Jujuy)
- Country: Argentina
- Province: Jujuy Province
- Time zone: UTC−3 (ART)

Lozano (Jujuy) is a rural municipality and village in Jujuy Province in Argentina.
