= Mexico City =

Capital and most populous city of Mexico

Mexico City: Ciudad de México (Spanish); Mexihco Hueyaltepetl (Central Nahuatl); U noj kaajil México (Yucatec Maya); 'Monda (Otomi)
- Capital and megacity
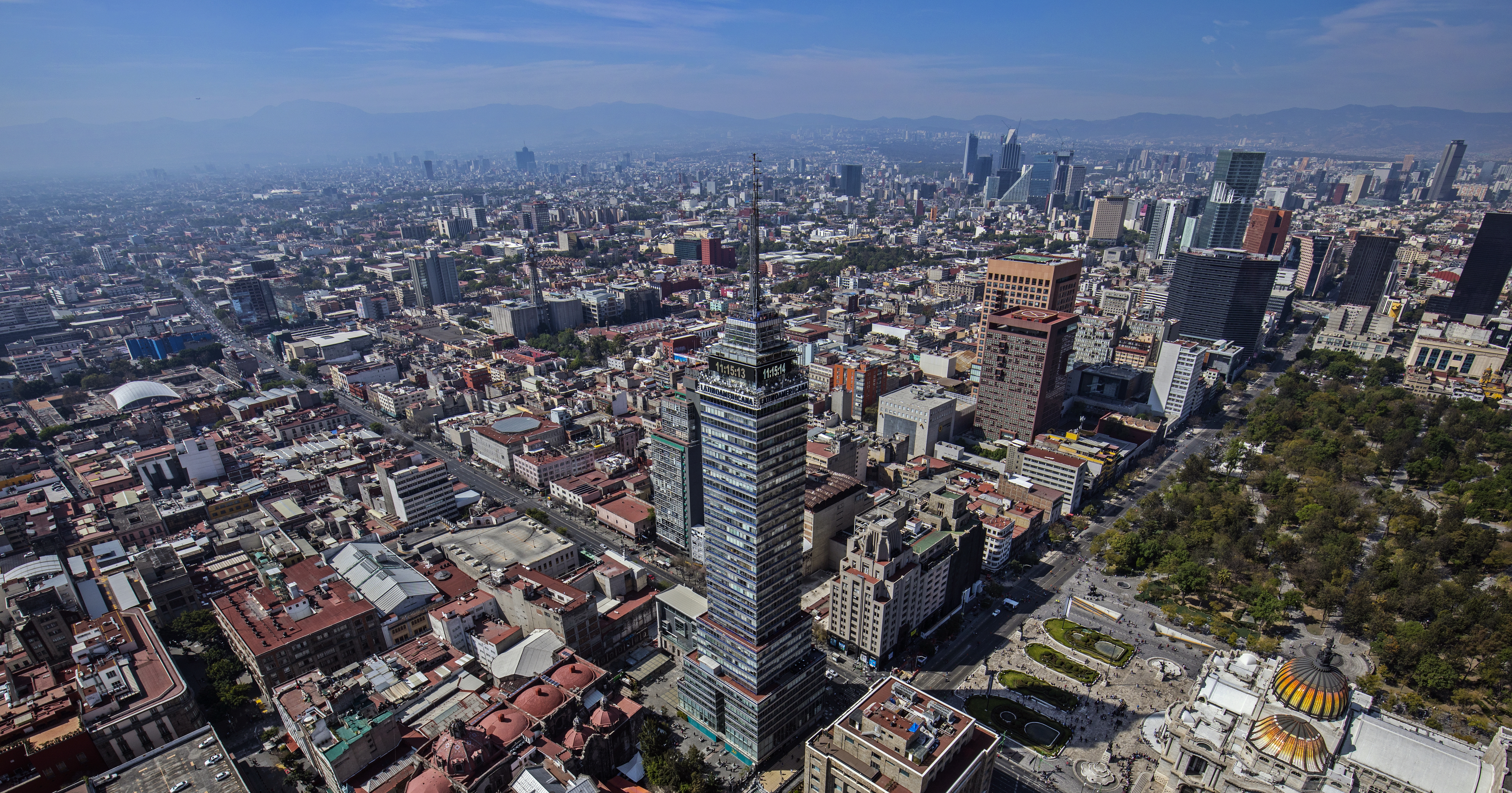
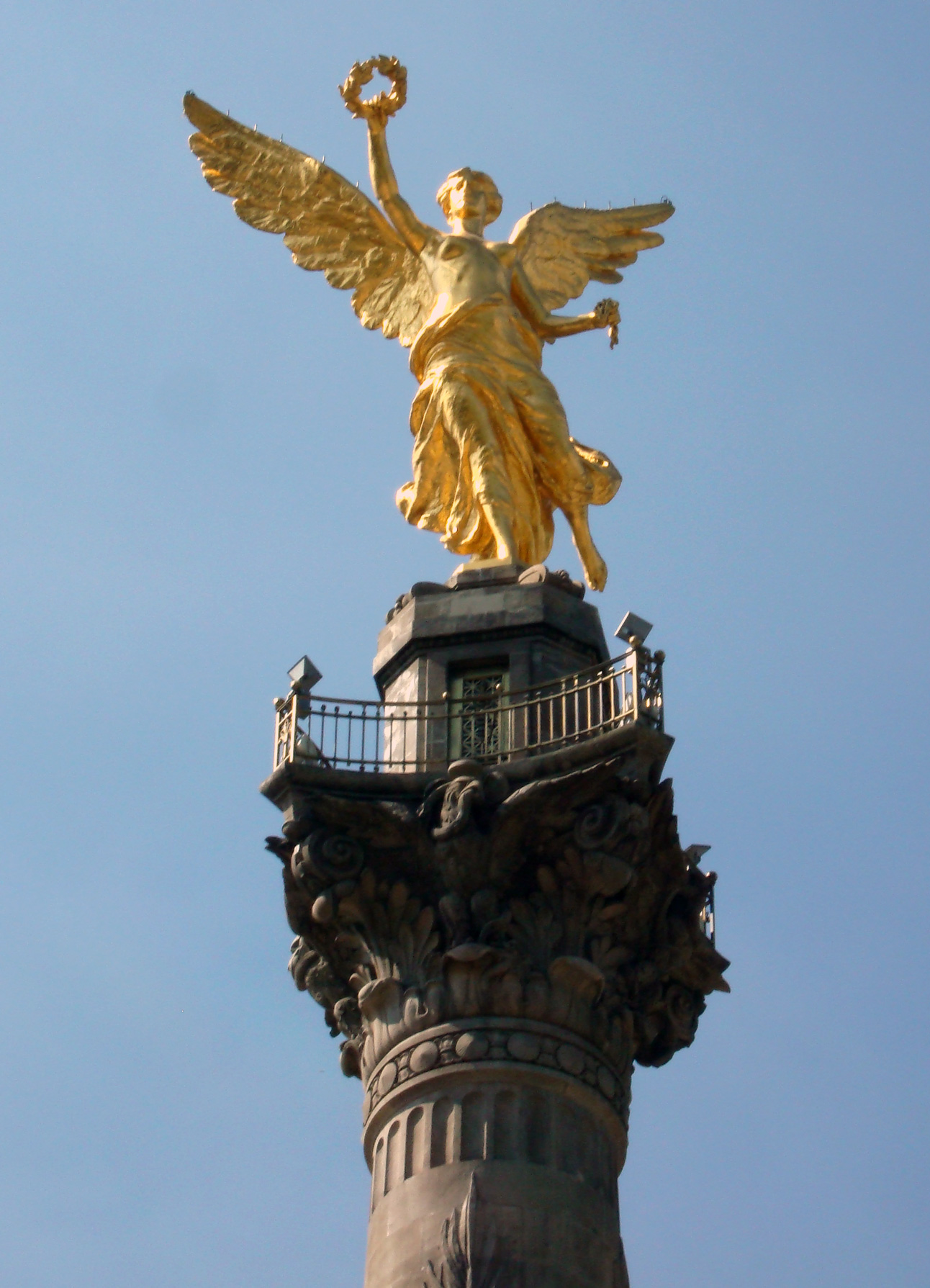
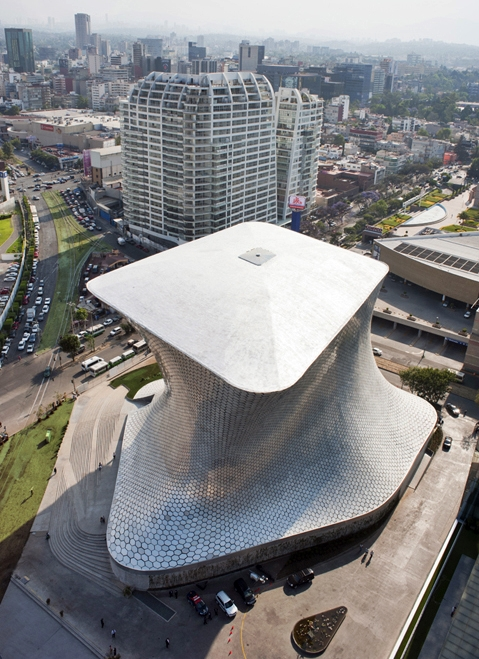
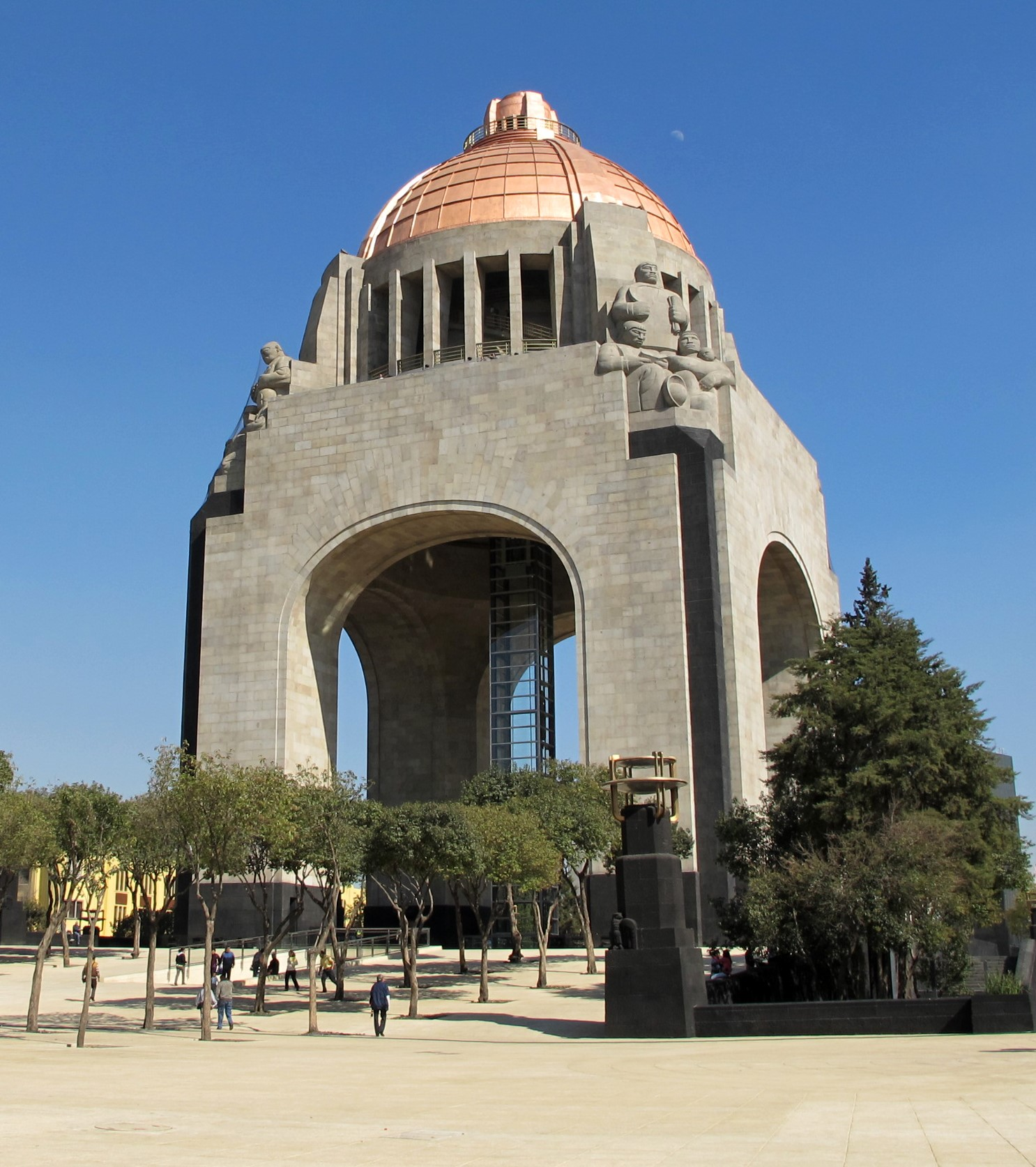
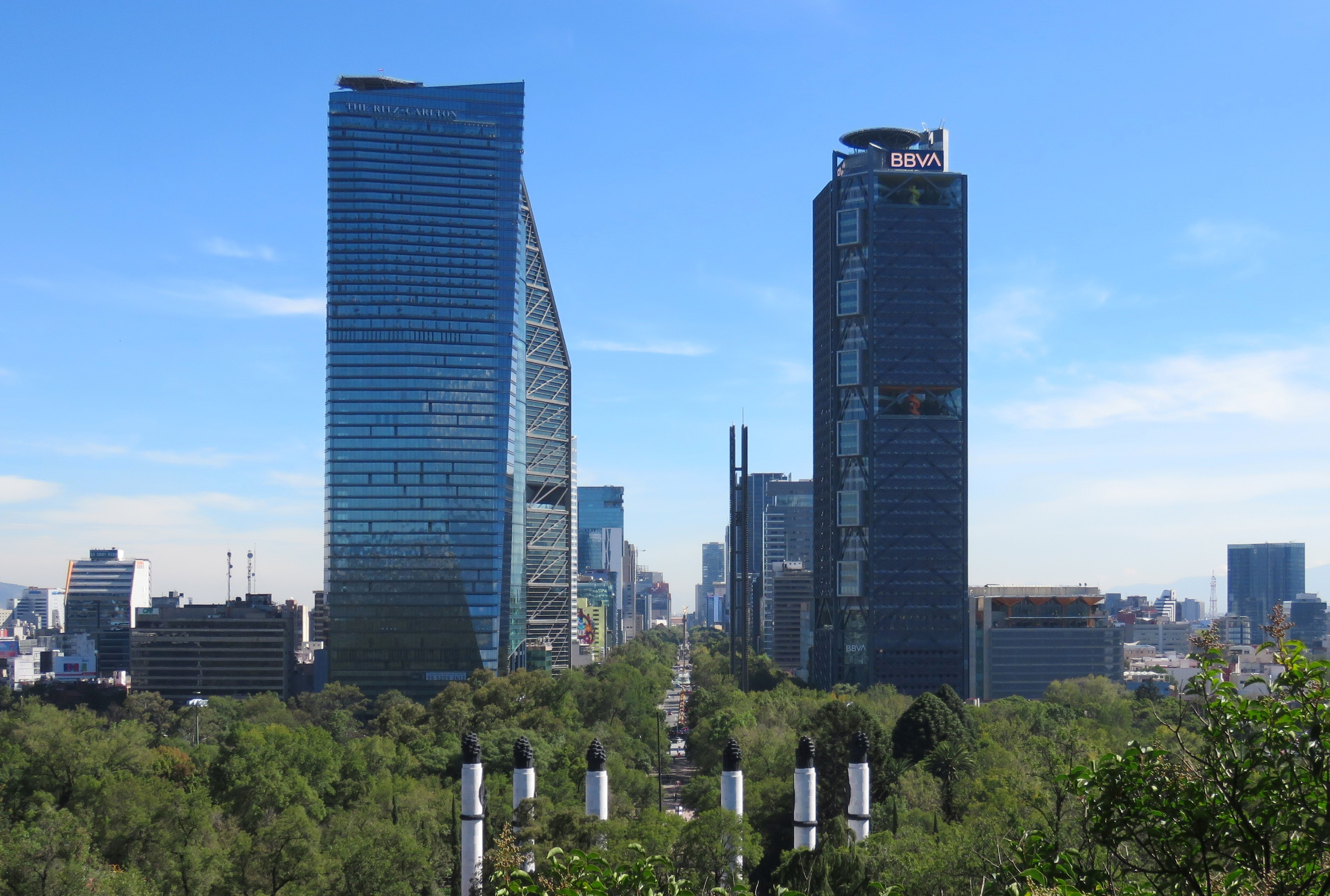
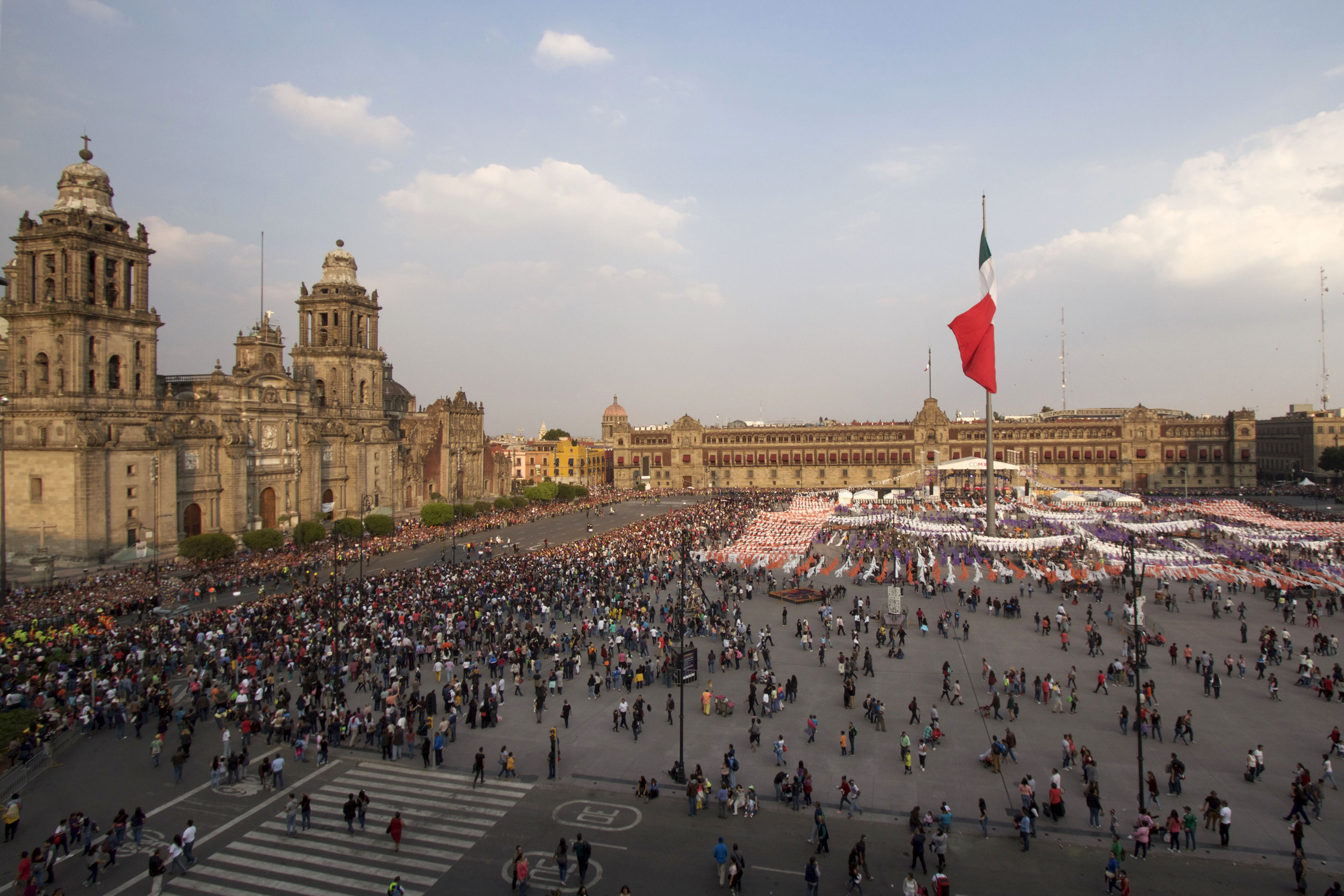
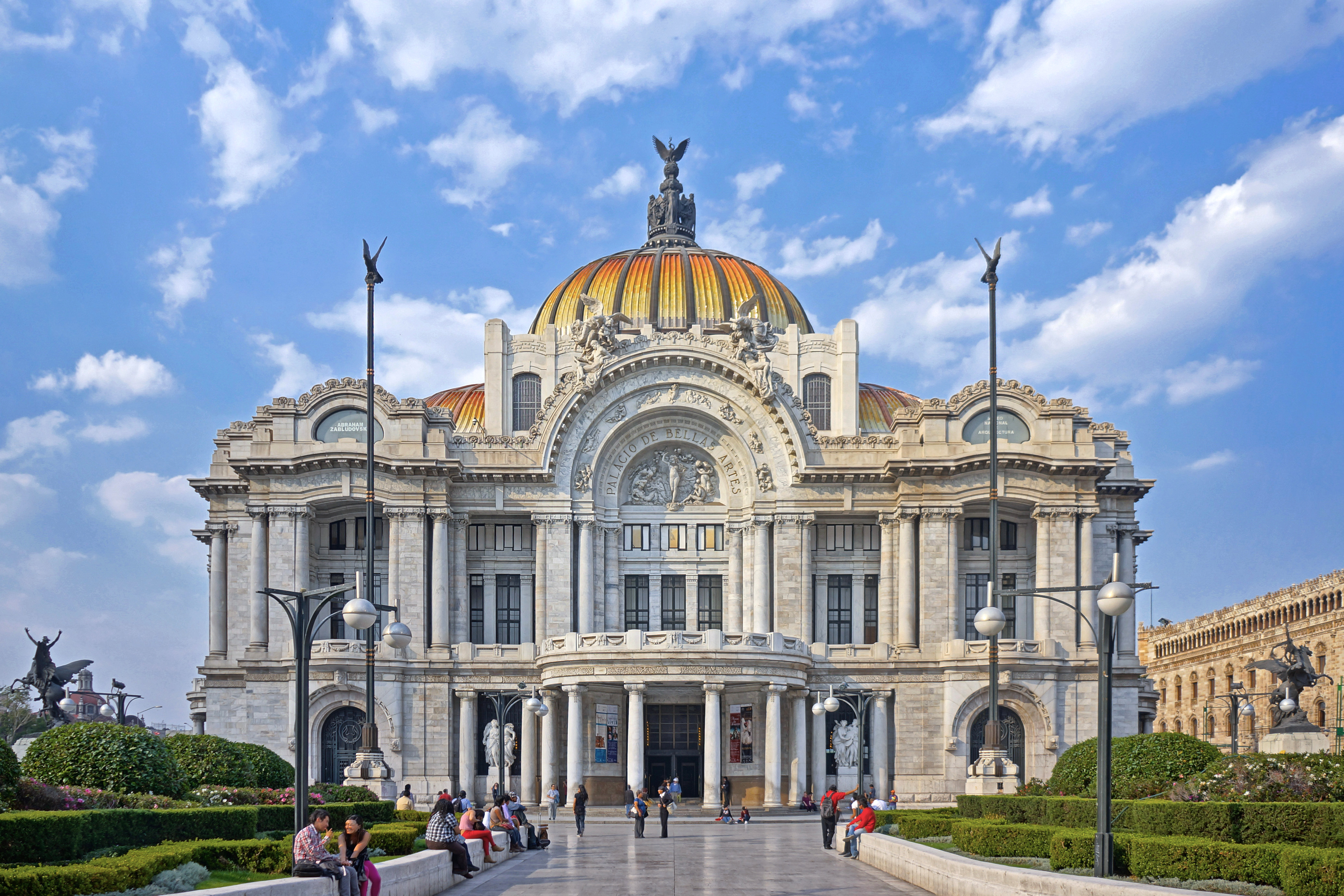
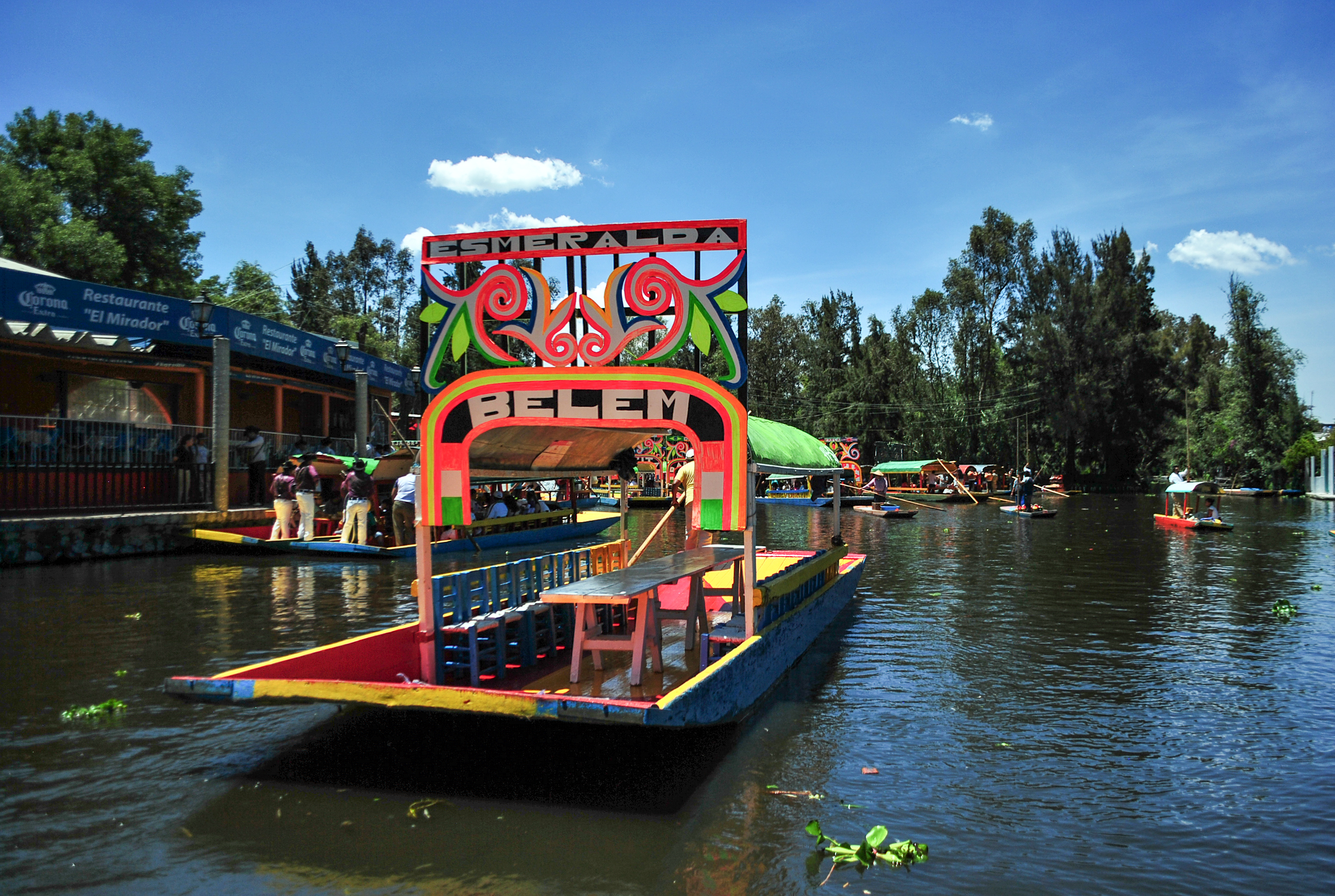
- Skyline of Mexico City with the Torre Latinoamericana Angel of Independence Museo Soumaya in Polanco Monument to the Revolution Paseo de la Reforma from the Chapultepec Castle Cathedral and National Palace in the Zócalo Palace of Fine Arts Trajineras in Xochimilco

- Coat of arms Government logo
- Nicknames: La Ciudad de los Palacios (The City of Palaces)
- Motto: Capital de la transformación (Capital of the transformation)
- Anthem: Himno de la Ciudad de México
- Mexico City within Mexico
- Interactive map of Mexico City
- Location within Mexico Location within North America
- Coordinates: 19°26′N 99°8′W
- Country: Mexico
- Founded: 13 March 1325: Mexico-Tenochtitlan; 13 August 1521: Ciudad de México; 18 November 1824: Distrito Federal; 29 January 2016: Ciudad de México
- Founder: Tenoch (as Mexico-Tenochtitlan); Hernán Cortés (as Mexico City)

Government
  - Head of Government: Clara Brugada (Morena)
  - Legislature: Congress of Mexico City

Area^{[b]}
  - Capital and megacity: 1,485 km^{2} (573 sq mi)
  - Metro: 7,866 km^{2} (3,037 sq mi)
- Ranked 32nd
- Elevation: 2,240 m (7,350 ft)
- Highest elevation (Ajusco): 3,930 m (12,890 ft)

Population (2020)
  - Capital and megacity: 9,209,944
  - Rank: 1st in North America; 1st in Mexico
  - Density: 6,202/km^{2} (16,060/sq mi)
  - Rank: 1st
  - Urban: 23,146,802
  - Metro: 21,804,515
- Demonyms: Capitalino (a); Mexiqueño (a) (archaic); Defeño (a) (archaic); Chilango (a) (colloquial)

GDP (Nominal, 2024)
  - Capital and megacity: MXN 5.04 trillion (US$248.69 billion)
  - Per capita: MXN 547,767 (US$27,023.53)
  - Metro: MXN 8.13 trillion (US$401.28 billion)
- Time zone: UTC−06:00 (Zona Centro)
- Postal code: 00–16
- Area code: 55/56
- ISO 3166 code: MX-CMX
- Patron Saint: Philip of Jesus (Spanish: San Felipe de Jesús)
- HDI: ▲0.876 very high Ranked 1st of 32
- Climate: Subtropical highland climate (Cwb)
- Website: cdmx.gob.mx

UNESCO World Heritage Site
- Official name: Historic center of Mexico City, Xochimilco and Central University City Campus of the UNAM
- Type: Cultural
- Criteria: i, ii, iii, iv, v
- Designated: 1987, 2007 (11th, 31st sessions)
- Reference no.: 412, 1250
- Region: Latin America and the Caribbean
- b. Area of Mexico City that includes non-urban areas at the south

Mexico City (often shortened as CDMX) (Note: Spanish: Ciudad de México, lit. 'City of Mexico', (Note: In Peninsular Spanish, the spelling variant Méjico, is also used alongside México. According to the Diccionario panhispánico de dudas by the Royal Spanish Academy and the Association of Academies of the Spanish Language, the spelling version with J is correct, however, the spelling with X is recommended, as it is the one is used in Mexican Spanish.) locally [sjuˈða(ð) ðe ˈmexiko], abbr. CDMX: Central Nahuatl: Mexihco Hueyaltepetl [meːˈʃiʔko wejaːlˈtepeːt͡ɬ]; Maya: u noj kaajil México; Otomi: 'Monda) is the capital and largest city of Mexico, as well as the most populous city in North America. It is one of the world's leading cultural and financial centers and, according to the Globalization and World Cities Research Network's 2024 ranking, is classified as an Alpha world city. Located in the Valley of Mexico on the high Mexican Central Plateau, the city sits at an altitude of 2,240 meters (7,350 feet). It is divided into 16 boroughs, or alcaldías, which are further subdivided into neighborhoods, or colonias.

According to the 2020 census, Mexico City proper had a population of 9,209,944 and a land area of 1,495 square kilometers (577 square miles), making it Mexico's primate city and the second-largest Spanish-speaking city proper in the world after Lima. Under the most recent definition agreed upon by the federal and state governments, Greater Mexico City had a population of 21,804,515, making it the world's 15th-largest metropolitan area and the second-largest urban agglomeration in the Western Hemisphere, after São Paulo. In 2011, Greater Mexico City had a GDP of $411 billion, making it one of the world's most productive urban areas. The city accounted for 15.8% of Mexico's GDP, while the metropolitan area accounted for about 22%. If it were an independent country in 2013, Mexico City would have been the fifth-largest economy in Latin America.

Mexico City is the oldest capital city in the Americas and one of only two founded by Indigenous peoples. (Note: Quito, the capital city of Ecuador, is the other such city.) It began as Tenochtitlan, a Mexica city built around 1325 on islands in Lake Texcoco. After the 1521 siege of Tenochtitlan, it was nearly destroyed and then rebuilt according to Spanish urban standards. In 1524, the municipality of Mexico City was established as México Tenochtitlán, and from 1585 onward it was officially known as Ciudad de México. During the Spanish colonial period, the city was a major political, administrative, and financial center. After Mexico became independent, the territory surrounding the city was organized in 1824 as the country's new and only federal district (Spanish: Distrito Federal or DF).

After years of demands for greater political autonomy, residents won the right to elect both the head of government and the members of the unicameral Legislative Assembly in 1997. Since then, left-wing parties, first the Party of the Democratic Revolution and later Morena, have controlled both offices. The city has also adopted several progressive policies, including legal abortion, a limited form of euthanasia, no-fault divorce, same-sex marriage, and legal gender change. On 29 January 2016, the Federal District was officially renamed Ciudad de México, or CDMX. These reforms granted the city greater autonomy and changed aspects of its government and political structure, though a constitutional clause still prevents it from becoming a state while it remains Mexico's capital.

== Nicknames and mottos ==
Up until 2013, it was common to refer to the city by the initialism "DF" from Distrito Federal de México (Federal District). Since 2013, use of the abbreviation "CDMX" has become more common. The city is also colloquially referred as just "México" when used in a local geographic context. This denomination is also used in road signs and highway names.

The informal demonym for Mexico City residents is chilango. Chilango was historically used pejoratively by people living outside Mexico City to "connote a loud, arrogant, ill-mannered, loutish person". For their part those living in Mexico City designate insultingly those who live elsewhere as living in la provincia ('the provinces', 'the periphery') and many proudly embrace the term chilango. Residents of Mexico City are formally called capitalinos (in reference to the city being the capital of the country), but "perhaps because capitalino is the more polite, specific, and correct word, it is almost never utilized".

Mexico City was traditionally known as La Ciudad de los Palacios ("the City of Palaces"), a nickname attributed to Baron Alexander von Humboldt. When visiting the city in the 19th century, he wrote a letter back to Germany, saying that Mexico City could rival any major city in Europe. English politician Charles Latrobe wrote the following: "... look at their works: the moles, aqueducts, churches, roads—and the luxurious City of Palaces which has risen from the clay-built ruins of Tenochtitlan...", on page 84 of the Letter V of The Rambler in Mexico.

During the colonial period, the city's motto was "Muy Noble e Insigne, Muy Leal e Imperial" (Very Noble and Distinguished, Very Loyal and Imperial). During Andrés Manuel López Obrador's administration (2000-2005) a political slogan was introduced: la Ciudad de la Esperanza (lit. 'The City of Hope'). This motto was quickly adopted as a city nickname but has faded since the new motto, Capital en Movimiento ("Capital in Movement"), was adopted by the administration headed by Marcelo Ebrard; this latter motto is not really treated as a nickname.

== History ==
The oldest signs of human occupation in the area of Mexico City are those of the "Peñón woman" and others found in San Bartolo Atepehuacan (Gustavo A. Madero). They were believed to correspond to the lower Cenolithic period (9500–7000 BC). However, a 2003 study placed the age of the Peñon woman at 12,700 years old (calendar age), one of the oldest human remains discovered in the Americas. Studies of her mitochondrial DNA suggest she was either of Asian or European or Aboriginal Australian origin.

The area was the destination of the migrations of the Teochichimecas during the 8th and 13th centuries, people that would give rise to the Toltec, and Mexica (Aztecs) cultures. The latter arrived around the 14th century to settle first on the shores of the lake.

=== Aztec period ===
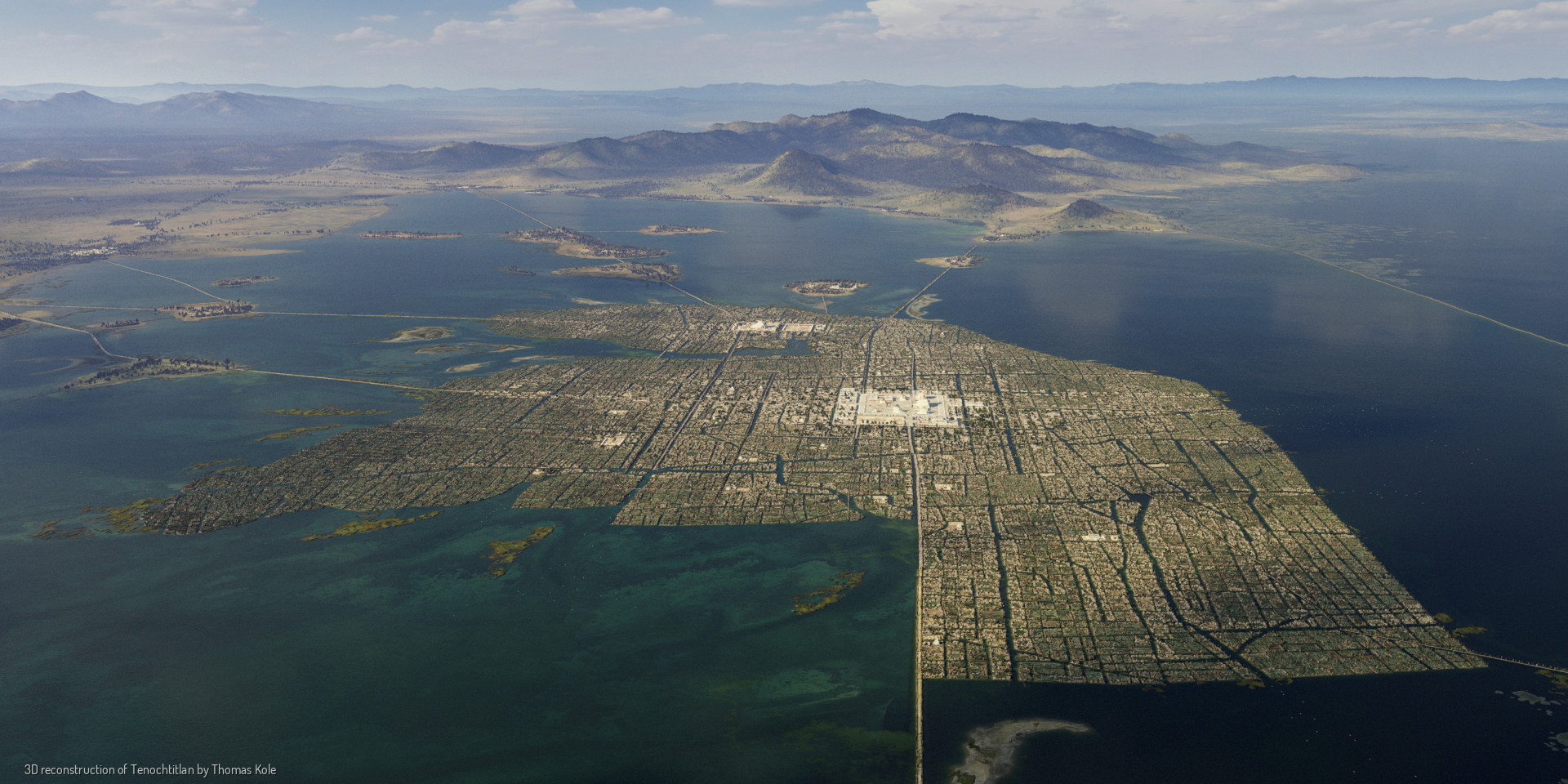
The city was the place of Mexico-Tenochtitlan, the Aztec capital.

The city of Mexico-Tenochtitlan was founded by the Mexica people in 1325 or 1327. The old Mexica city that is now referred to as Tenochtitlan was built on an island in the center of the inland lake system of the Valley of Mexico, which is shared with a smaller city-state called Tlatelolco. According to legend, the Mexicas' principal god, Huitzilopochtli, indicated the site where they were to build their home by presenting a golden eagle perched on a prickly pear devouring a rattlesnake.

Between 1325 and 1521, Tenochtitlan grew in size and strength, eventually dominating the other city-states around Lake Texcoco and in the Valley of Mexico. When the Spaniards arrived, the Aztec Empire had reached much of Mesoamerica, touching both the Gulf of Mexico and the Pacific Ocean.

=== Spanish conquest ===
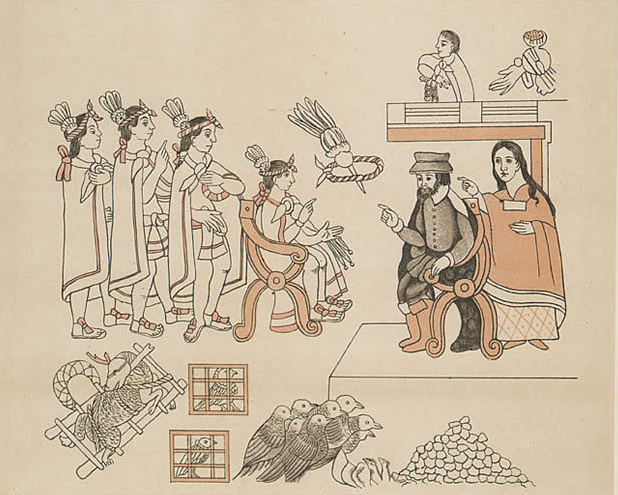
The panel dedicated to the Tenochtitlan campaign, as depicted in the 1552 Canvas of Tlaxcala. Hernando Cortés and Malintzin (right) meet Moctezuma II in Mexico-Tenochtitlan, 8 November 1519.

After landing in Veracruz, Spanish explorer Hernán Cortés advanced upon Tenochtitlan with the aid of many of the other native peoples, arriving there on 8 November 1519. Cortés and his men marched along the causeway leading into the city from Iztapalapa (Ixtapalapa), and the city's ruler, Moctezuma II, greeted the Spaniards; they exchanged gifts, but the camaraderie did not last long. Cortés put Moctezuma under house arrest at his father's palace, hoping to rule through him.

Tensions increased until, on the night of 30 June 1520 – during a struggle known as "La Noche Triste" – the Aztecs rose up against the Spanish intrusion and managed to capture or drive out the Europeans and their Tlaxcalan allies. Cortés regrouped at Tlaxcala. The Aztecs thought the Spaniards were permanently gone, and they elected a new king, Cuitláhuac, but he soon died; the next king was Cuauhtémoc. Cortés began a siege of Tenochtitlan in May 1521. For three months, the city suffered from the lack of food and water as well as the spread of smallpox brought by the Europeans. Cortés and his allies landed their forces in the south of the island and slowly fought their way through the city. Cuauhtémoc surrendered in August 1521. The Spaniards practically razed Tenochtitlan during the final siege of the conquest.

Cortés first settled in Coyoacán, but decided to rebuild the Aztec site to erase all traces of the old order. He did not establish a territory under his own personal rule, but remained loyal to the Spanish crown. The first Spanish viceroy arrived in Mexico City fourteen years later. By that time, the city had again become a city-state, having power that extended far beyond its borders. Although the Spanish preserved Tenochtitlan's basic layout, they built Catholic churches over the old Aztec temples and claimed the imperial palaces for themselves. Tenochtitlan was renamed "Mexico" because the Spanish found the word easier to pronounce.

=== Growth of colonial Mexico City ===
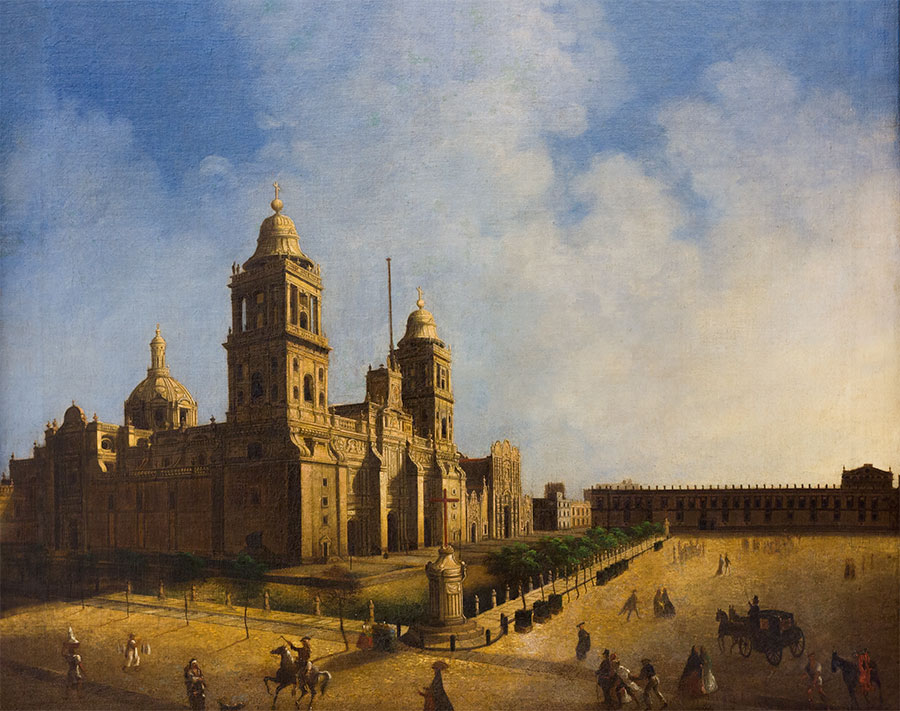
Mexico City Metropolitan Cathedral's (1571–1813) 18th century painting. The cathedral was built by the Spaniards over the ruins of the main Aztec temple.

The city had been the capital of the Aztec Empire and in the colonial era, "Mexico" became the capital of New Spain. The viceroy of Mexico or vice-king lived in the viceregal palace on the main square or Zócalo. The Mexico City Metropolitan Cathedral, the seat of the Archbishopric of New Spain, was constructed on another side of the Zócalo, as was the archbishop's palace, and across from it the building housing the city council or ayuntamiento of the city. A late seventeenth-century painting of the Zócalo by Cristóbal de Villalpando depicts the main square, which had been the old Aztec ceremonial center. The existing central plaza of the Aztecs was effectively and permanently transformed to the ceremonial center and seat of power during the colonial period, and remains to this day in modern Mexico, the central plaza of the nation. The rebuilding of the city after the siege of Tenochtitlan was accomplished by the abundant indigenous labor in the surrounding area. Franciscan friar Toribio de Benavente Motolinia, one of the Twelve Apostles of Mexico who arrived in New Spain in 1524, described the rebuilding of the city as one of the afflictions or plagues of the early period:

The seventh plague was the construction of the great City of Mexico, which, during the early years used more people than in the construction of Jerusalem. The crowds of laborers were so numerous that one could hardly move in the streets and causeways, although they are very wide. Many died from being crushed by beams, or falling from high places, or in tearing down old buildings for new ones.

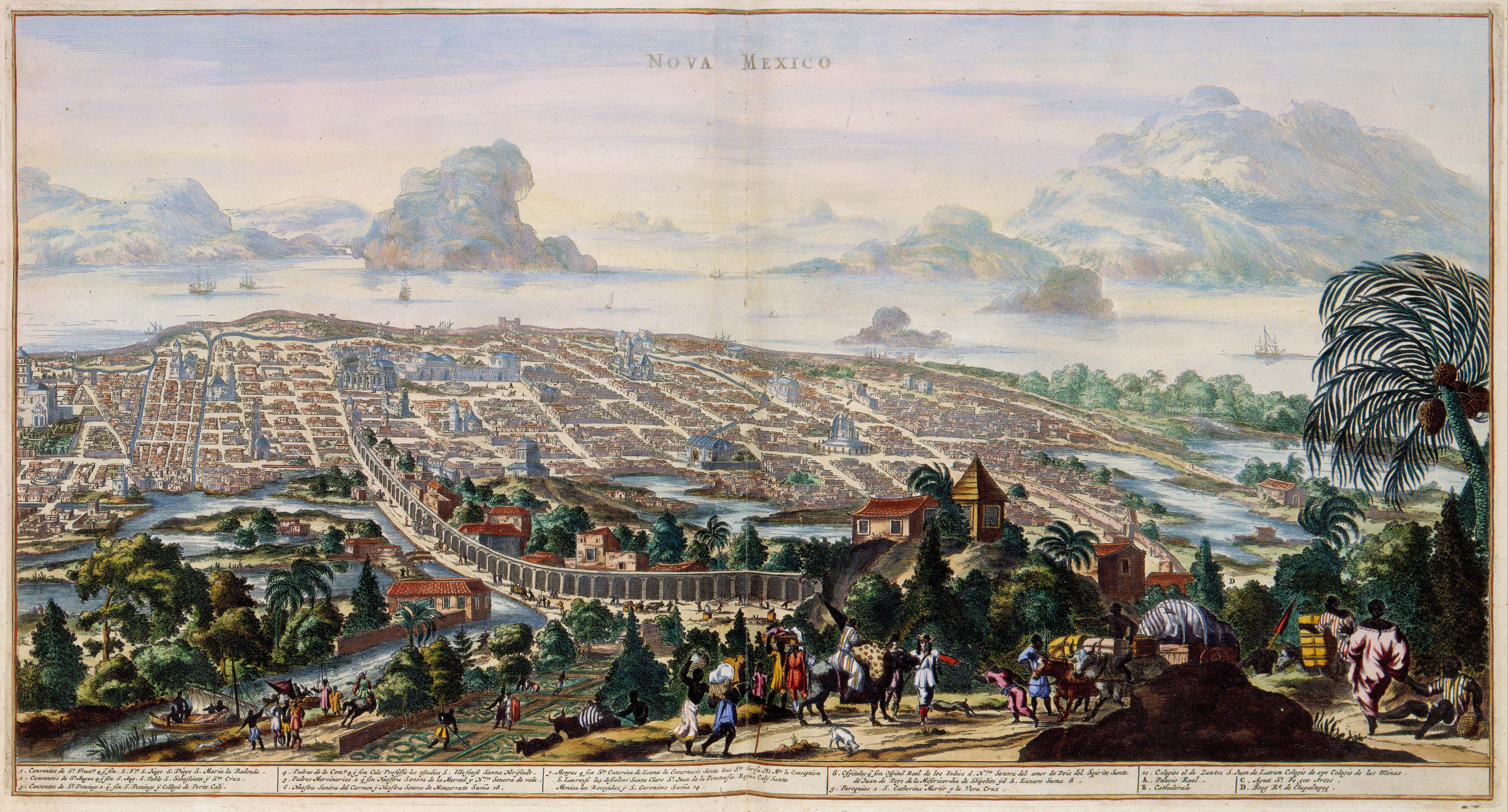
Mexico City in 1690. Atlas Van der Hagen.

Preconquest Tenochtitlan was built in the center of the inland lake system, with the city reachable by canoe and by wide causeways to the mainland. The causeways were rebuilt under Spanish rule with indigenous labor. Colonial Spanish cities were constructed on a grid pattern, if no geographical obstacle prevented it. In Mexico City, the Zócalo (main square) was the central place from which the grid was then built outward. The Spanish lived in the area closest to the main square in what was known as the traza, in orderly, well laid-out streets. Indigenous residences were outside that exclusive zone and houses were haphazardly located. The Zócalo was a center of commerce for indigenous people, making Spanish efforts to keep the area segregated difficult to enforce. At intervals Zócalo was where major celebrations took place as well as executions. It was also the site of two major riots in the seventeenth century, one in 1624, the other in 1692.

The city grew as the population did, coming up against the lake's waters. As the depth of the lake water fluctuated, Mexico City was subject to periodic flooding. A major labor draft, the desagüe, compelled thousands of indigenous over the colonial period to work on infrastructure to prevent flooding. Floods were not only an inconvenience but also a health hazard, since during flood periods human waste polluted the city's streets. By draining the area, the mosquito population dropped as did the frequency of the diseases they spread. However, draining the wetlands also changed the habitat for fish and birds and the areas accessible for indigenous cultivation close to the capital. The 16th century saw a proliferation of churches, many of which can still be seen today in the historic center. Economically, Mexico City prospered as a result of trade. Unlike Brazil or Peru, Mexico had easy contact with both the Atlantic and Pacific worlds. Although the Spanish crown tried to completely regulate all commerce in the city, it had only partial success.

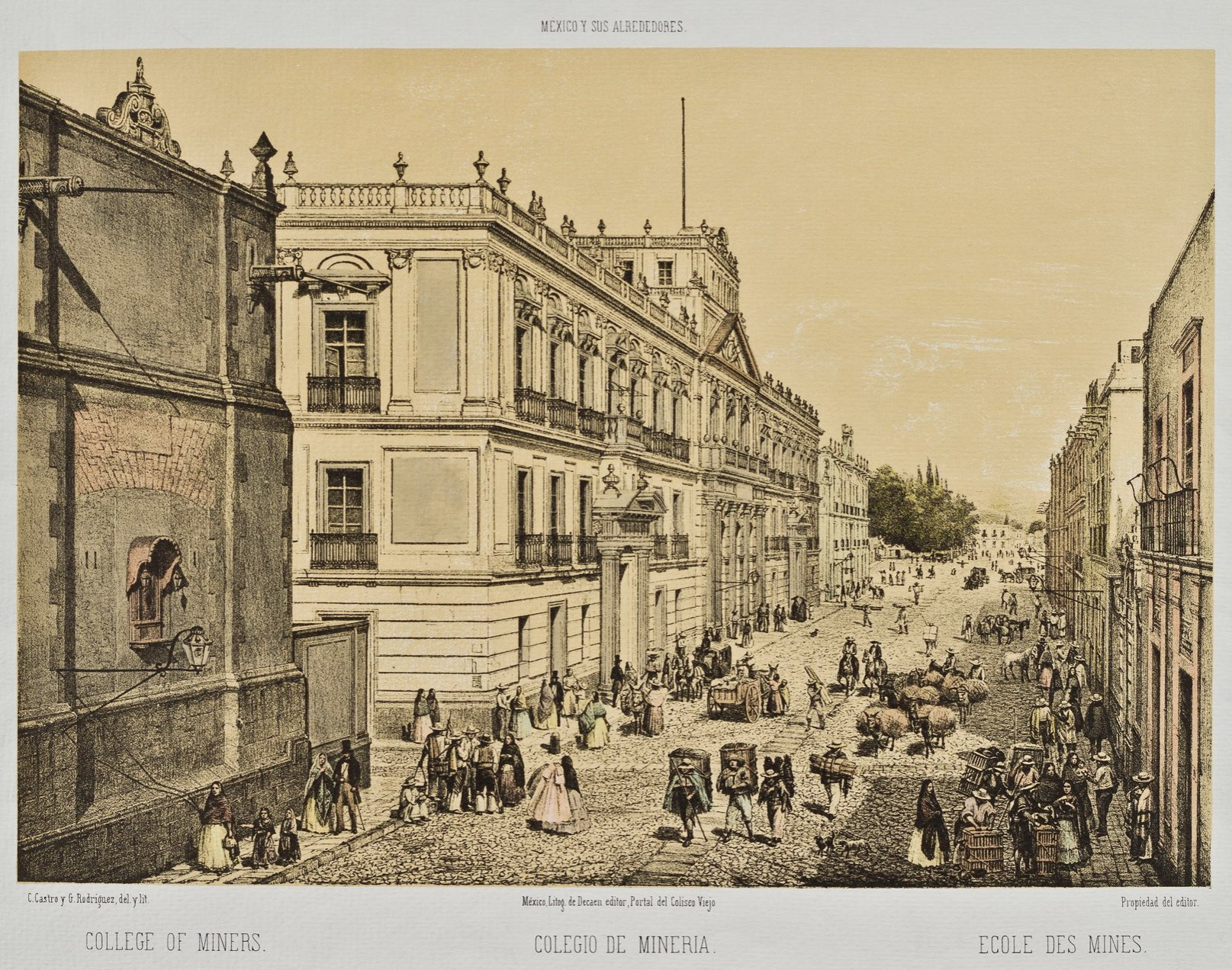
Palacio de Minería, Mexico City. The elevation of silver mining as a profession and the ennoblement of silver miners was a development of the eighteenth-century Bourbon Reforms.

The concept of nobility flourished in New Spain in a way not seen in other parts of the Americas. Spaniards encountered a society in which the concept of nobility mirrored that of their own. Spaniards respected the indigenous order of nobility and added to it. In the ensuing centuries, possession of a noble title in Mexico did not mean one exercised great political power, for one's power was limited even if the accumulation of wealth was not. The concept of nobility in Mexico was not political but rather a very conservative Spanish social one, based on proving the worthiness of the family. Most of these families proved their worth by making fortunes in New Spain outside of the city itself, then spending the revenues in the capital, building churches, supporting charities and building extravagant palatial homes. The craze to build the most opulent residence possible reached its height in the last half of the 18th century. Many of these palaces can still be seen today, leading to Mexico City's nickname of "The city of palaces" given by Alexander Von Humboldt.

The Grito de Dolores ("Cry of Dolores"), also known as El Grito de la Independencia ("Cry of Independence"), marked the beginning of the Mexican War of Independence. The Battle of Guanajuato, the first major engagement of the insurgency, occurred four days later. After a decade of war, Mexico's independence from Spain was effectively declared in the Declaration of Independence of the Mexican Empire on 27 September 1821. Agustín de Iturbide is proclaimed Emperor of the First Mexican Empire by Congress, crowned in the Cathedral of Mexico.

The Mexican Federal District was established by the new government and by the signing of their new constitution, where the concept of a federal district was adapted from the United States Constitution. Before this designation, Mexico City had served as the seat of government for both the State of Mexico and the nation as a whole. Texcoco de Mora and then Toluca became the capital of the State of Mexico.

=== Battle of Mexico City in the U.S.–Mexican War of 1847 ===
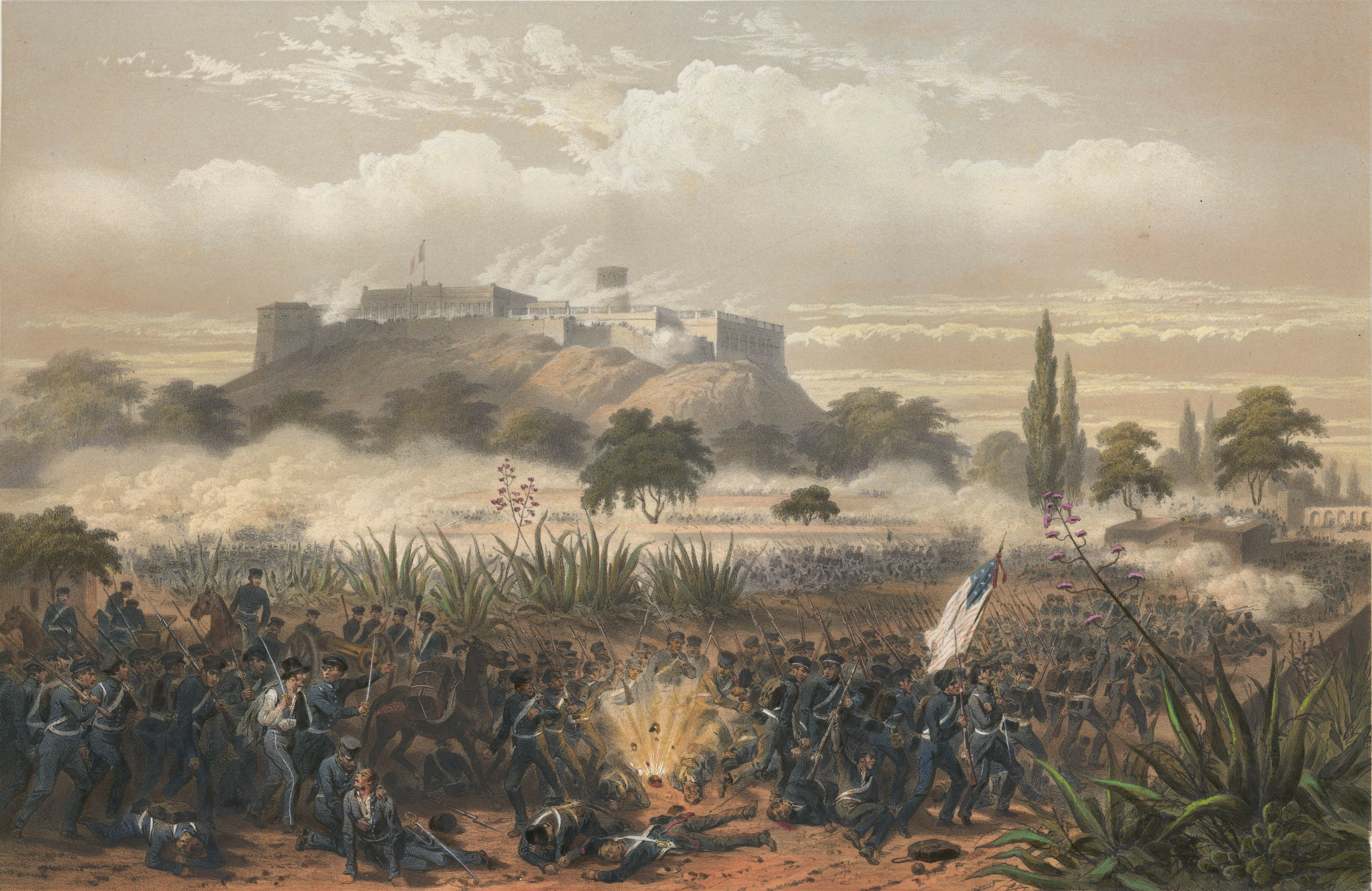
The American assault on the Chapultepec Castle, 1847 by Nebel and Bayot

During the 19th century, Mexico City was the center stage of all the political disputes of the country. It was the imperial capital on two occasions (1821–1823 and 1864–1867), and of two federalist states and two centralist states that followed innumerable coups d'états in the space of half a century before the triumph of the Liberals after the Reform War. It was also the objective of one of the two French invasions to Mexico (1861–1867), and occupied for a year by American troops in the framework of the Mexican–American War (1847–1848).

The Battle for Mexico City was the series of engagements from 8 to 15 September 1847, in the general vicinity of Mexico City during the U.S. Mexican War. Included are major actions at the battles of Molino del Rey and Chapultepec, culminating with the fall of Mexico City. The U.S. Army under Winfield Scott scored a major success that ended the war. The American invasion into the Federal District was first resisted during the Battle of Churubusco on 8 August, where the Saint Patrick's Battalion, which was composed primarily of Catholic Irish and German immigrants but also Canadians, English, French, Italians, Poles, Scots, Spaniards, Swiss, and Mexicans, fought for the Mexican cause, repelling the American attacks. After defeating the Saint Patrick's Battalion, the Mexican–American War came to a close after the United States deployed combat units deep into Mexico resulting in the capture of Mexico City and Veracruz by the U.S. Army's 1st, 2nd, 3rd and 4th Divisions. The invasion culminated with the storming of Chapultepec Castle in the city itself.

During this battle, on 13 September, the 4th Division, under John A. Quitman, spearheaded the attack against Chapultepec and carried the castle. Future Confederate generals George E. Pickett and James Longstreet participated in the attack. Serving in the Mexican defense were the cadets later immortalized as Los Niños Héroes (the "Boy Heroes"). The Mexican forces fell back from Chapultepec and retreated within the city. Attacks on the Belén and San Cosme Gates came afterwards. The treaty of Guadalupe Hidalgo was signed in what is now the far north of the city.

=== Mexican Revolution (1910–1920) ===
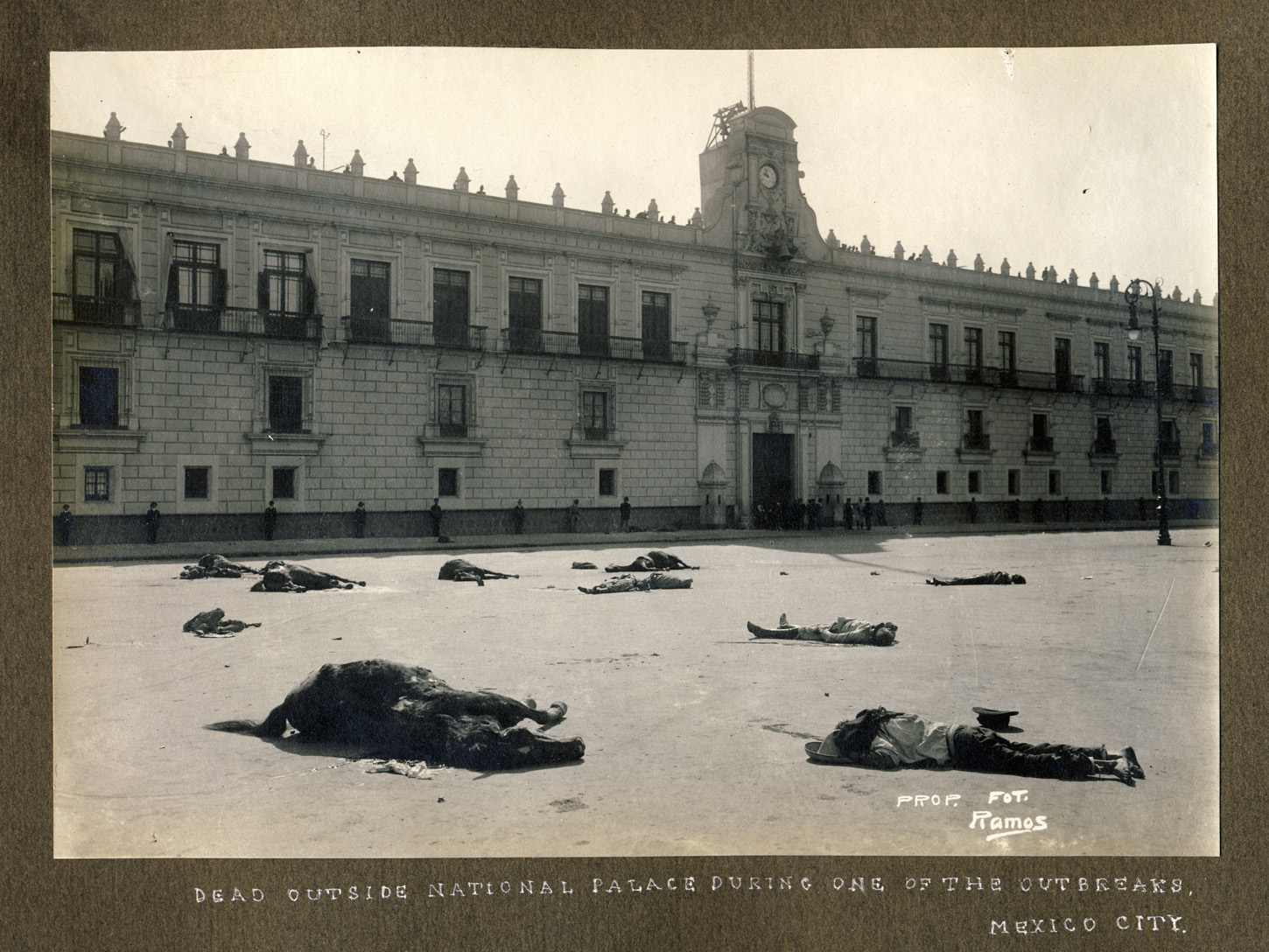
Corpses in front of the National Palace during the Ten Tragic Days. Photographer, Manuel Ramos.

The capital escaped the worst of the violence of the ten-year conflict of the Mexican Revolution. The most significant episode of this period for the city was the Decena Trágica ("Ten Tragic Days") of February 1913, when forces counter to the elected government of Francisco I. Madero staged a successful coup. The center of the city was subjected to artillery attacks from the army stronghold of the ciudadela or citadel, with significant civilian casualties and the undermining of confidence in the Madero government. Victoriano Huerta, chief general of the Federal Army, saw a chance to take power, forcing Madero and Pino Suarez to sign resignations. The two were murdered later while on their way to Lecumberri prison. Huerta's ouster in July 1914 saw the entry of the armies of Pancho Villa and Emiliano Zapata, but the city did not experience violence. Huerta had abandoned the capital and the conquering armies marched in. Venustiano Carranza's Constitutionalist faction ultimately prevailed in the revolutionary civil war and Carranza took up residence in the presidential palace.

=== 20th century to present ===
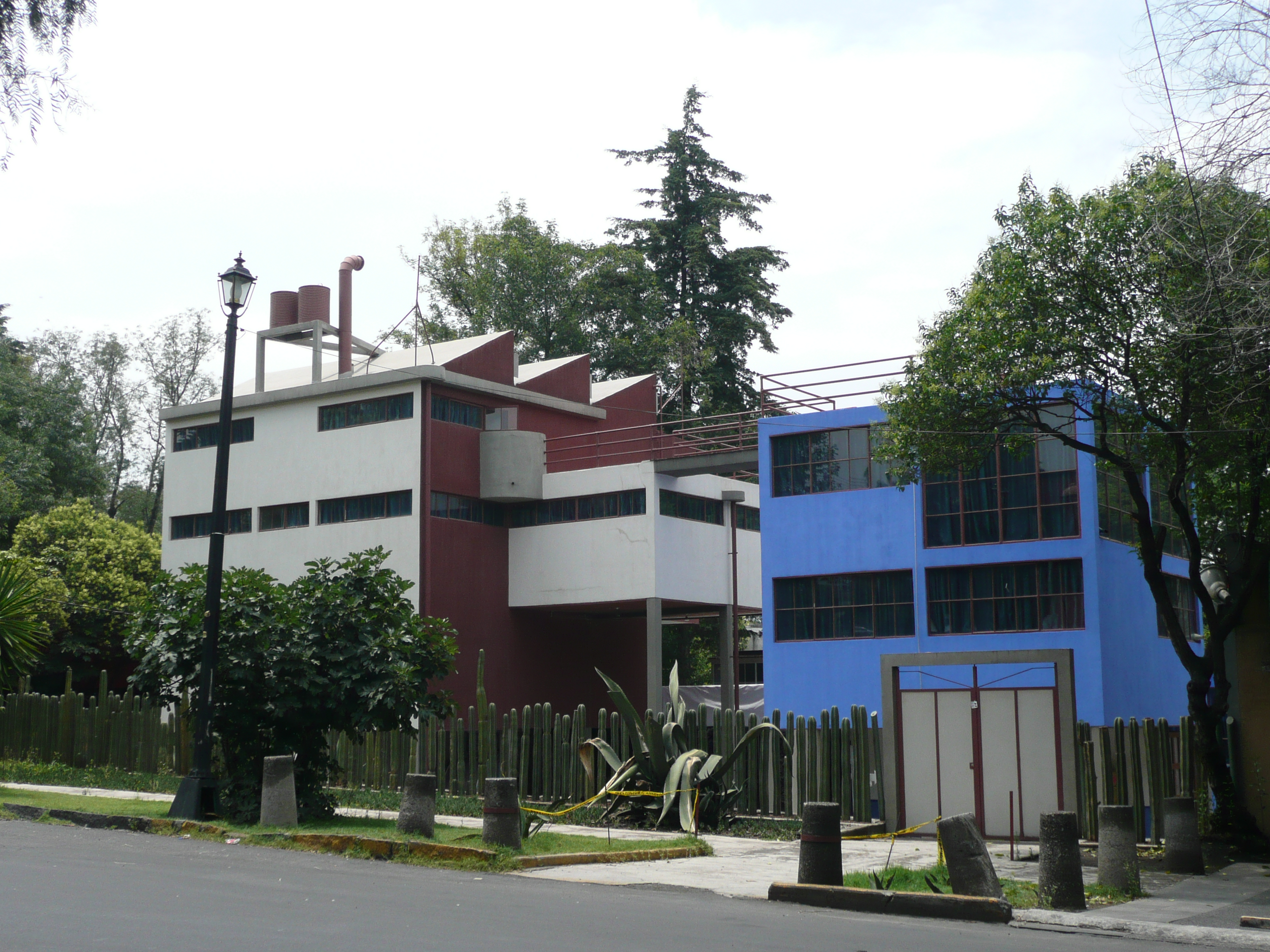
Frida Kahlo and Diego Rivera house in San Ángel designed by Juan O'Gorman

In the 20th century the phenomenal growth of the city and its environmental and political consequences dominate. In 1900, the population of Mexico City was about 500,000. The city began to grow rapidly westward in the early part of the 20th century and then began to grow upwards in the 1950s, with the Torre Latinoamericana becoming the city's first skyscraper.

The rapid development of Mexico City as a center for modernist architecture was most fully manifested in the mid-1950s construction of the Ciudad Universitaria, Mexico City, the main campus of the National Autonomous University of Mexico. Designed by the most prestigious architects of the era, including Mario Pani, Eugenio Peschard, and Enrique del Moral, the buildings feature murals by artists Diego Rivera, David Alfaro Siqueiros, and José Chávez Morado. It has since been recognized as a UNESCO World Heritage Site.

The 1968 Olympic Games brought about the construction of large sporting facilities. In 1969, the Mexico City Metro was inaugurated. Explosive growth in the population of the city started in the 1960s, with the population overflowing the boundaries of the Federal District into the neighboring State of Mexico, especially to the north, northwest, and northeast. Between 1960 and 1980 the city's population more than doubled to nearly 9 million.

In 1980, half of all the industrial jobs in Mexico were located in Mexico City. Under relentless growth, the Mexico City government could barely keep up with services. Villagers from the countryside who continued to pour into the city to escape poverty only compounded the city's problems. With no housing available, they took over lands surrounding the city, creating huge shanty towns. The inhabitants of Mexico City faced serious air pollution and water pollution problems, as well as groundwater-related subsidence. Air and water pollution has been contained and improved in several areas due to government programs, the renovation of vehicles and the modernization of public transportation.

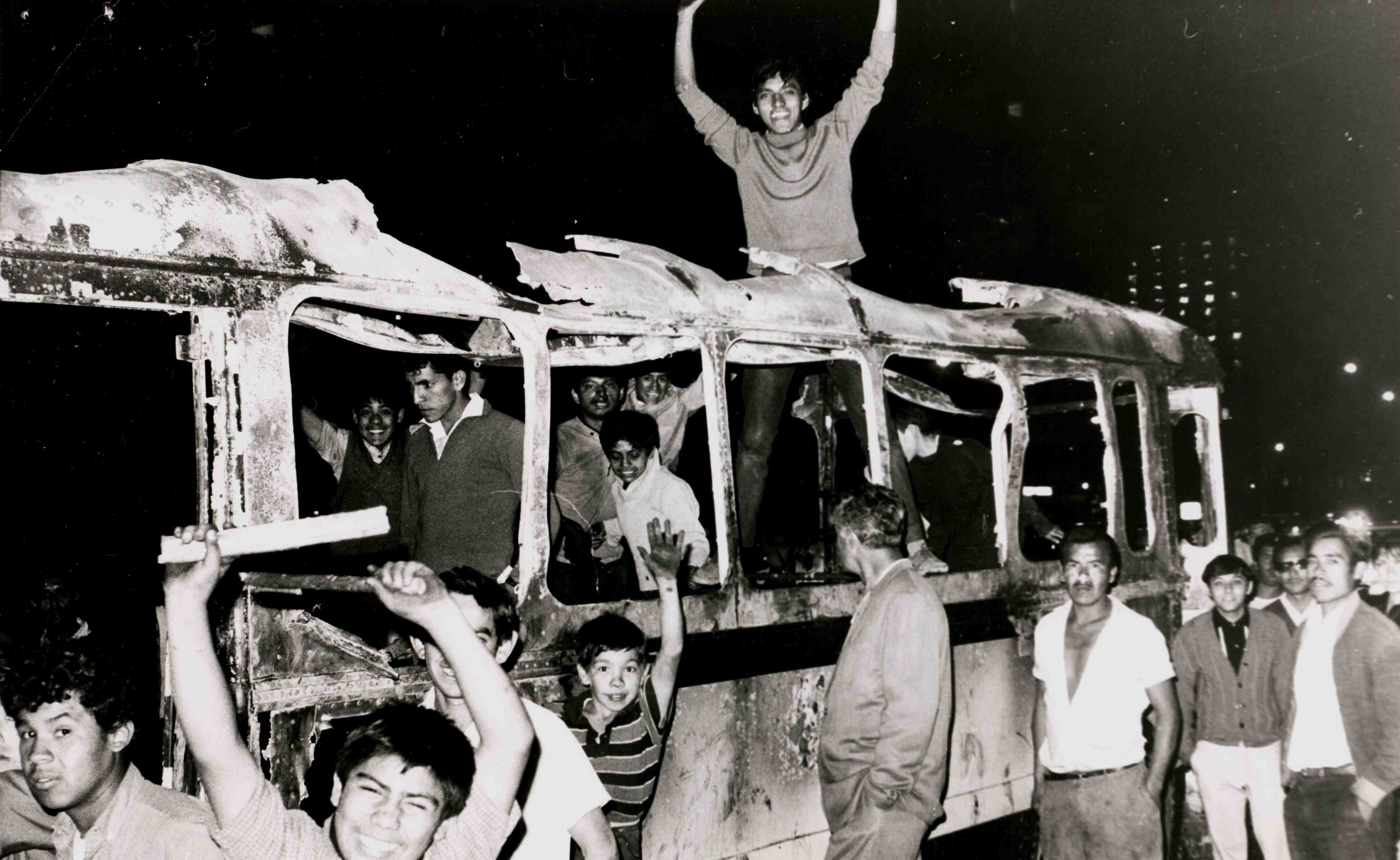
Students in a burned bus during the Tlatelolco massacre 1968

The autocratic government that ruled Mexico City since the Revolution was tolerated, mostly because of the continued economic expansion since World War II. This was the case even though this government could not handle the population and pollution problems adequately. Nevertheless, discontent and protests began in the 1960s leading to the massacre of an unknown number of protesting students in Tlatelolco. Three years later, a demonstration in the Maestros avenue, organized by former members of the 1968 student movement, was violently repressed by a paramilitary group called "Los Halcones", composed of gang members and teenagers from many sports clubs who received training in the US.

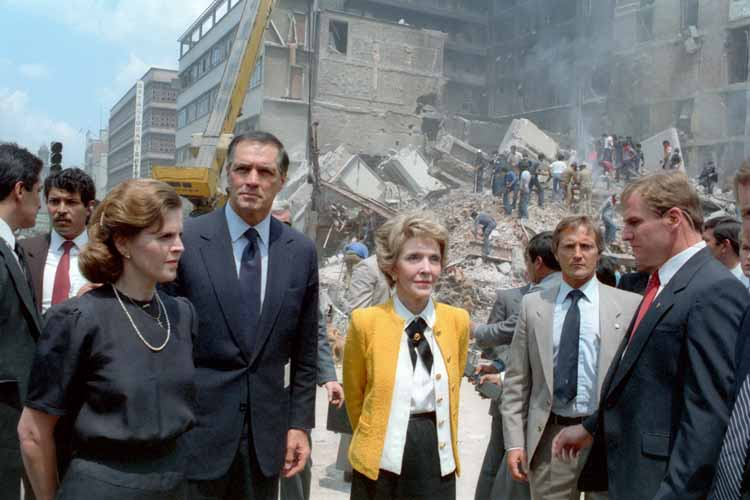
First ladies Paloma Cordero of Mexico (left) and Nancy Reagan of the United States (right) with U.S. Ambassador to Mexico, John Gavin observing the damage done by the 1985 earthquake

On 19 September 1985, at 7:19am CST, the area was struck by the 1985 Mexico City earthquake. The earthquake proved to be a disaster politically for the one-party state government. The Mexican government was paralyzed by its own bureaucracy and corruption, forcing ordinary citizens to create and direct their own rescue efforts and to reconstruct much of the housing that was lost as well.

== Geography ==
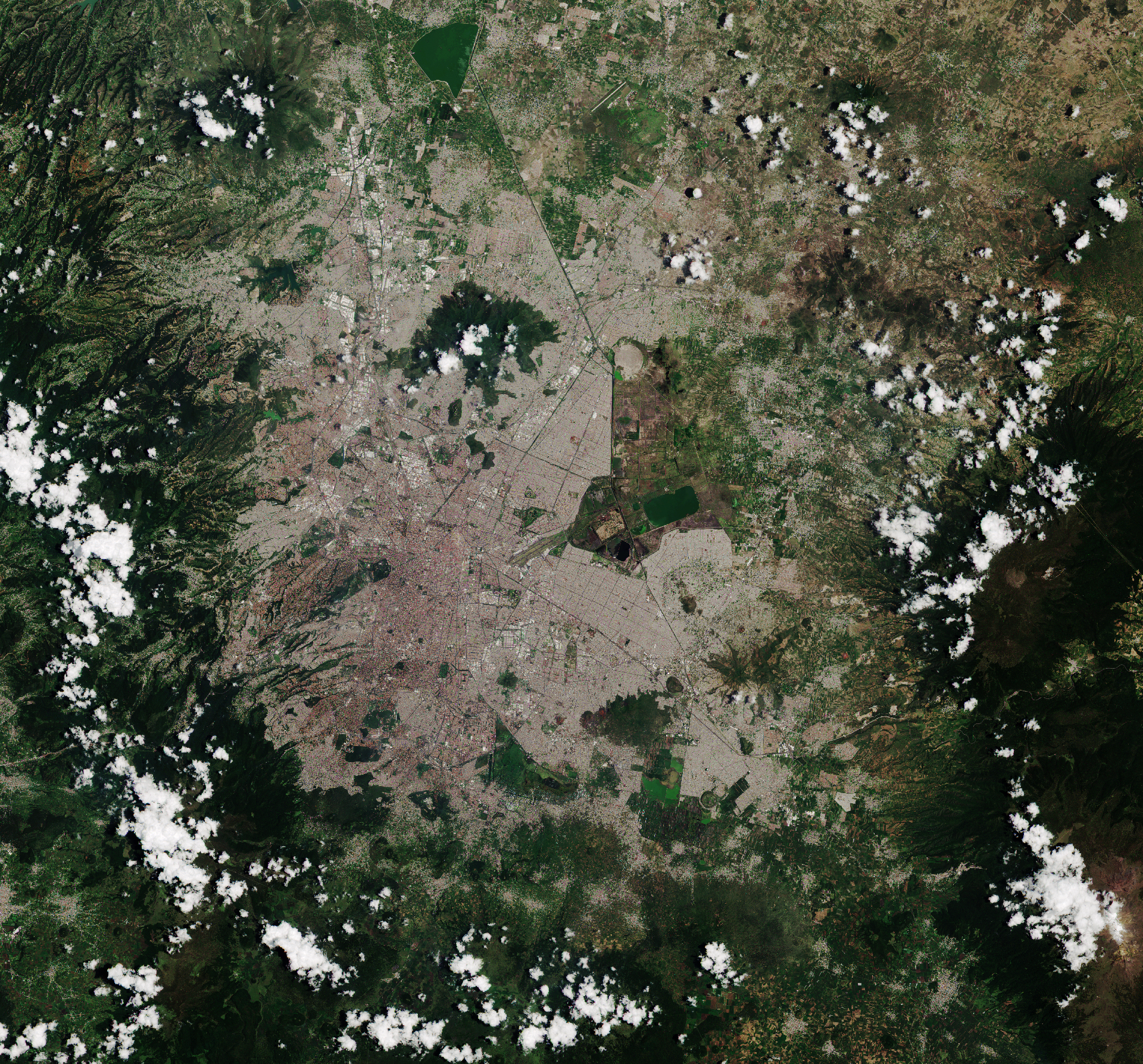
Satellite image of Mexico City

Mexico City is located in the Valley of Mexico, sometimes called the Basin of Mexico. This valley is located in the Trans-Mexican Volcanic Belt in the high plateaus of south-central Mexico.

It has a minimum altitude of 2,200 meters (7,200 feet) above sea level and is surrounded by mountains and volcanoes that reach elevations of over 5,000 meters (16,000 feet). This valley has no natural drainage outlet for the waters that flow from the mountainsides, making the city vulnerable to flooding. Drainage was engineered through the use of canals and tunnels starting in the 17th century.

Mexico City primarily rests on what was Lake Texcoco. Seismic activity is frequent there. Lake Texcoco was drained starting from the 17th century. Although none of the lake waters remain, the city rests on the lake bed's heavily saturated clay. This soft base is collapsing due to the over-extraction of groundwater, called groundwater-related subsidence.

Since the beginning of the 20th century the city has sunk as much as nine meters (30 feet) in some areas, and it continues to sink almost 50 centimetres (20 in) every year. This sinking is causing problems with runoff and wastewater management, leading to flooding problems, especially during the summer. The entire lake bed is now paved over and most of the city's remaining forested areas lie in the southern boroughs of Milpa Alta, Tlalpan and Xochimilco.

Mexico City geophysical maps

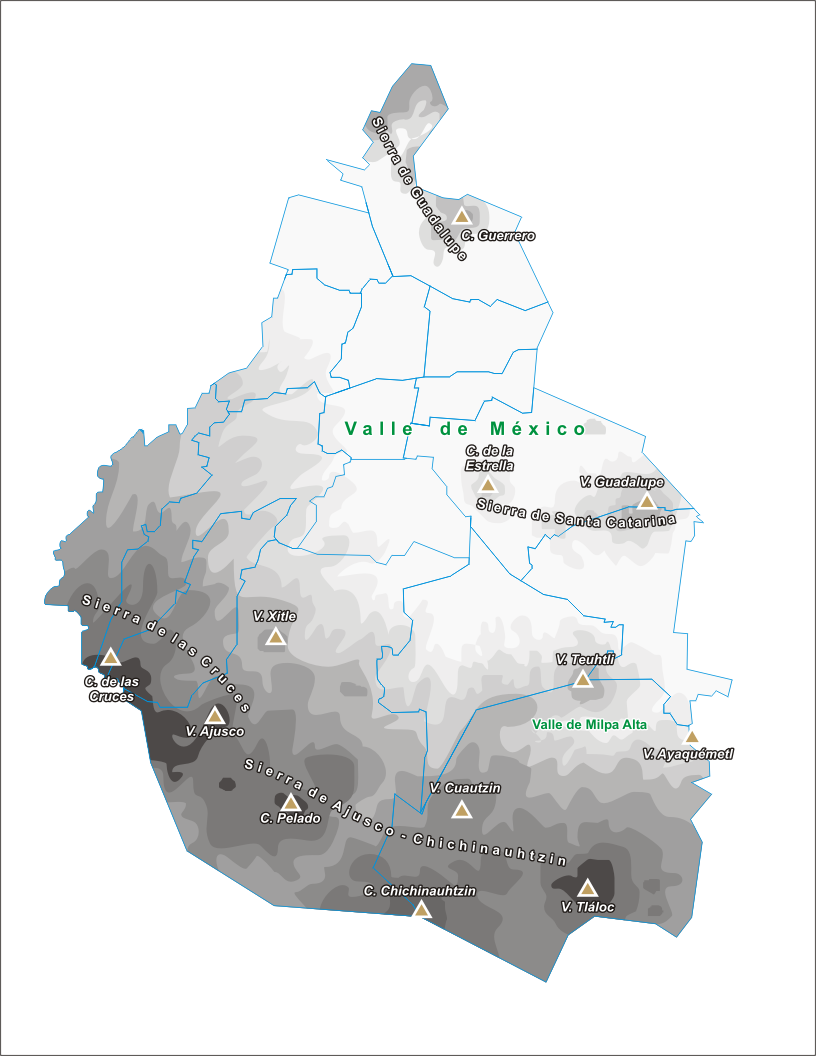
Topography

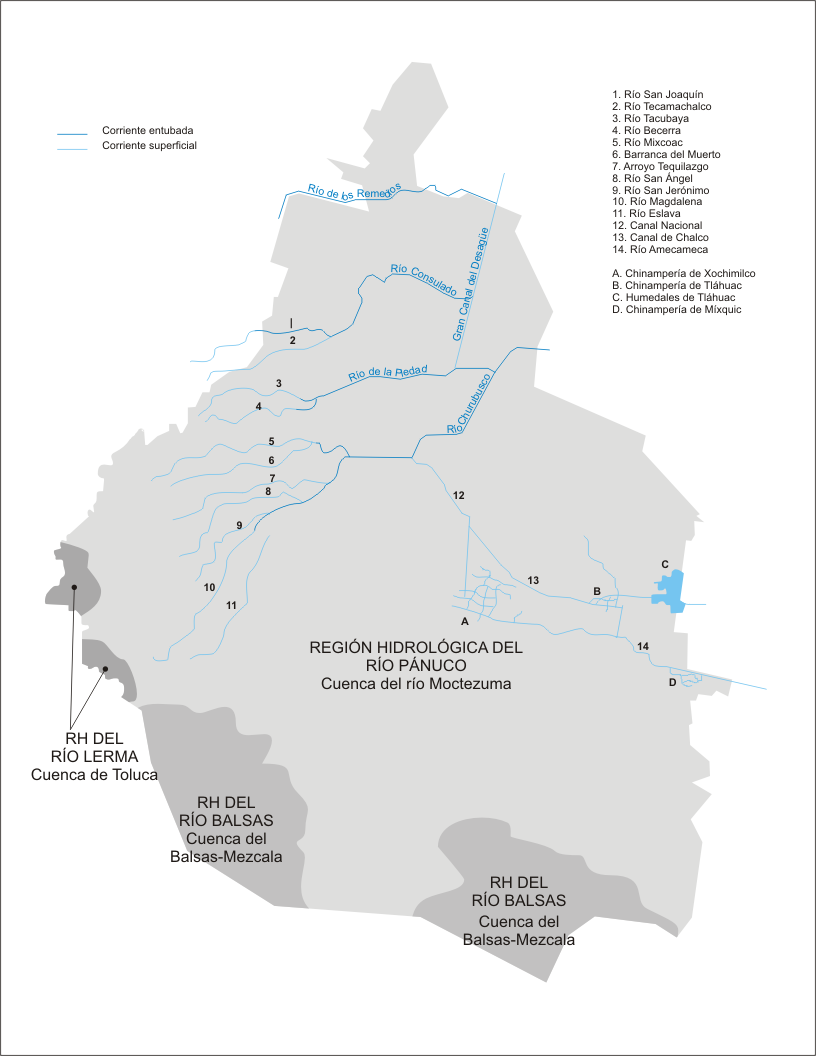
Hydrology

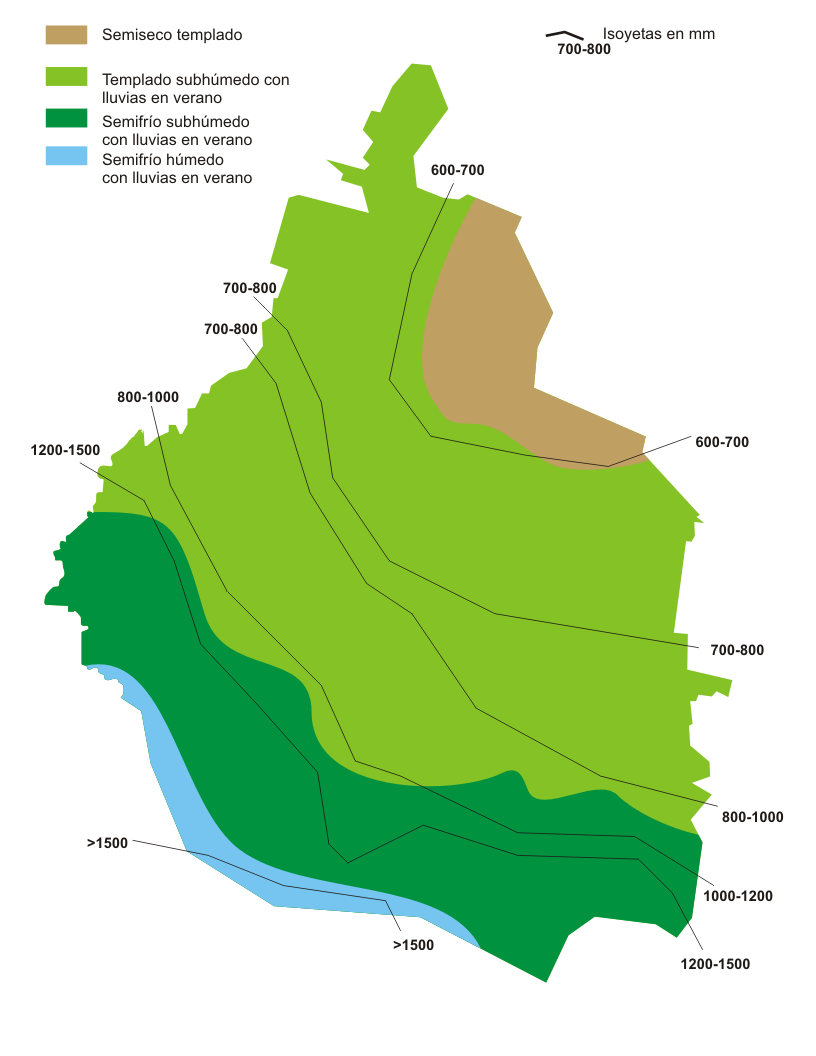
Climate patterns

=== Environment ===
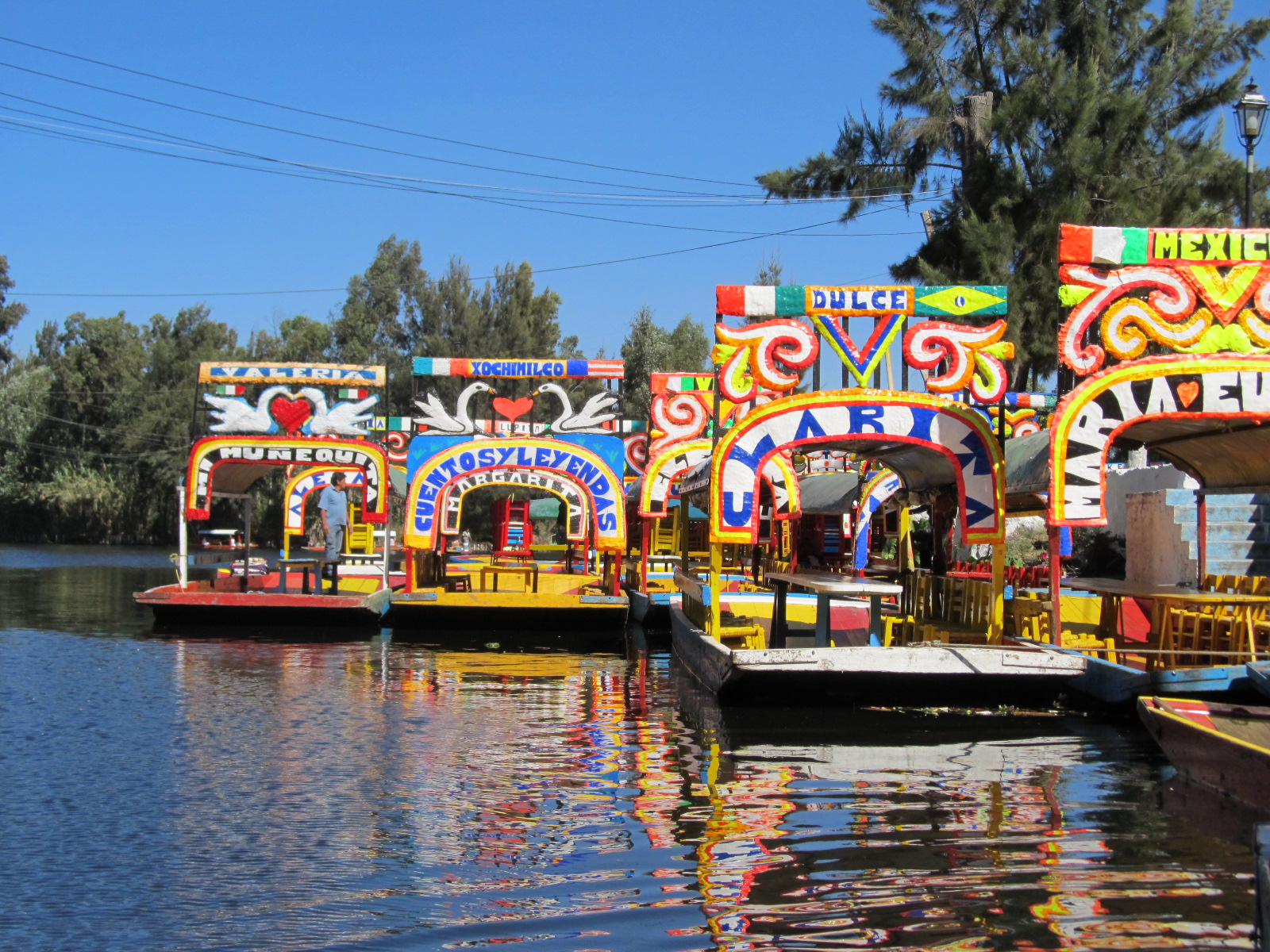
Trajineras in the canals of Xochimilco. Xochimilco and the historic center of Mexico City were declared a World Heritage Site in 1987.

Originally much of the valley lay beneath the waters of Lake Texcoco, a system of interconnected salt and freshwater lakes. The Aztecs built dikes to separate the fresh water used to raise crops in chinampas and to prevent recurrent floods. These dikes were destroyed during the siege of Tenochtitlan, and during colonial times the Spanish regularly drained the lake to prevent floods. Only a small section of the original lake remains, located outside Mexico City, in the municipality of Atenco, State of Mexico.

Architects Teodoro González de León and Alberto Kalach along with a group of Mexican urbanists, engineers and biologists have developed the project plan for Recovering the City of Lakes. If approved by the government the project will contribute to the supply of water from natural sources to the Valley of Mexico, the creation of new natural spaces, a great improvement in air quality, and greater population establishment planning.

=== Pollution ===
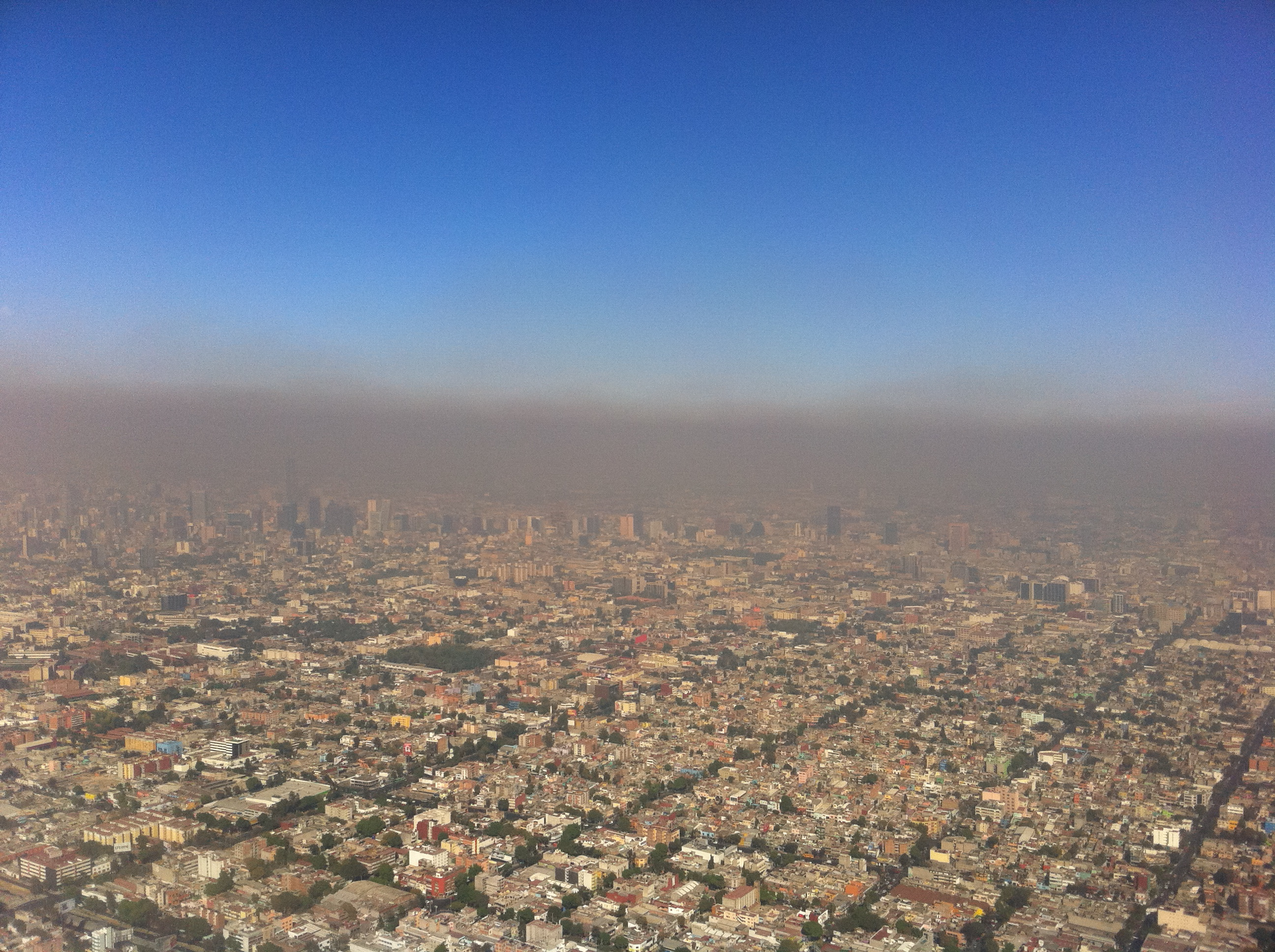
Air pollution over Mexico City. Air quality is poorest during the winter.

By the 1990s Mexico City had become infamous as one of the world's most polluted cities; however, the city has since become a model for drastically lowering pollution levels. By 2014 carbon monoxide pollution had dropped drastically, while sulfur dioxide and nitrogen dioxide were at levels about a third of those in 1992. The levels of signature pollutants in Mexico City are similar to those of Los Angeles. Despite the cleanup, the metropolitan area is still the most ozone-polluted part of the country, with ozone levels 2.5 times beyond WHO-defined safe limits.

To clean up pollution, the federal and local governments implemented numerous plans including the constant monitoring and reporting of environmental conditions, such as ozone and nitrogen oxides. When the levels of these two pollutants reached critical levels, contingency actions were implemented which included closing factories, changing school hours, and extending the A day without a car program to two days of the week. The government also instituted industrial technology improvements, a strict biannual vehicle emission inspection and the reformulation of gasoline and diesel fuels. The introduction of Metrobús bus rapid transit and the Ecobici bike-sharing were among efforts to encourage alternate, greener forms of transportation.

=== Parks and recreation ===
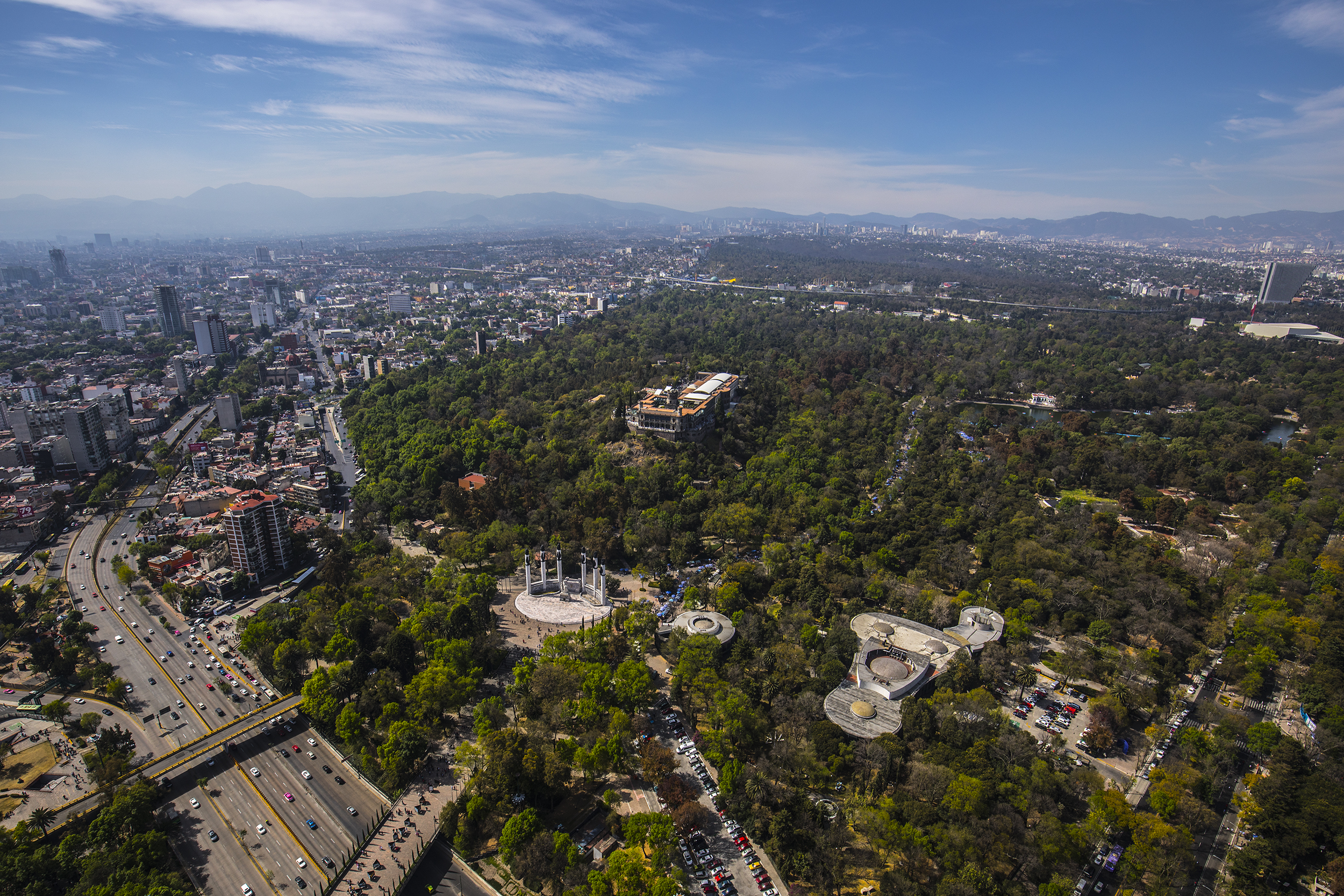
Chapultepec was an important park during the Aztec Empire, whose access had been limited to its nobility; it was declared open to the public by a decree of Charles V in 1530. It is one of the world's largest city parks.

Chapultepec, the city's most iconic public park, has history back to the Aztec emperors who used the area as a retreat. It is south of Polanco district, and houses the Chapultepec Zoo the main city's zoo, several ponds and seven museums, including the National Museum of Anthropology. Other iconic city parks include the Alameda Central, it is recognized as the oldest public park in the Americas. Parque México and Parque España in the hip Condesa district; Parque Hundido and Parque de los Venados in Colonia del Valle, and Parque Lincoln in Polanco. There are many smaller parks throughout the city. Most are small "squares" occupying two or three square blocks amid residential or commercial districts. Several other larger parks such as the Bosque de Tlalpan and Viveros de Coyoacán, and in the east Alameda Oriente, offer many recreational activities. Northwest of the city is a large ecological reserve, the Bosque de Aragón. In the southeast is the Xochimilco Ecological Park and Plant Market, a World Heritage Site. West of Santa Fe district are the pine forests of the Desierto de los Leones National Park. Amusement parks include Six Flags México, in Ajusco neighborhood which is the largest in Latin America. There are numerous seasonal fairs present in the city.

Mexico City has three zoos. Chapultepec Zoo, the San Juan de Aragon Zoo and Los Coyotes Zoo. Chapultepec Zoo is located in the first section of Chapultepec Park in the Miguel Hidalgo. It was opened in 1924. Visitors can see about 243 specimens of different species including kangaroos, giant panda, gorillas, caracal, hyena, hippos, jaguar, giraffe, lemur, lion, among others. Zoo San Juan de Aragon is near the San Juan de Aragon Park in the Gustavo A. Madero. In this zoo, opened in 1964, there are species that are in danger of extinction such as the jaguar and the Mexican wolf. Other guests are the golden eagle, pronghorn, bighorn sheep, caracara, zebras, African elephant, macaw, hippo, among others. Zoo Los Coyotes is a 27.68-acre (11.2 ha) zoo located south of Mexico City in the Coyoacan. It was inaugurated on 2 February 1999. It has more than 301 specimens of 51 species of wild native or endemic fauna from the area, featuring eagles, ajolotes, coyotes, macaws, bobcats, Mexican wolves, raccoons, mountain lions, teporingos, foxes, and white-tailed deer.

=== Climate ===
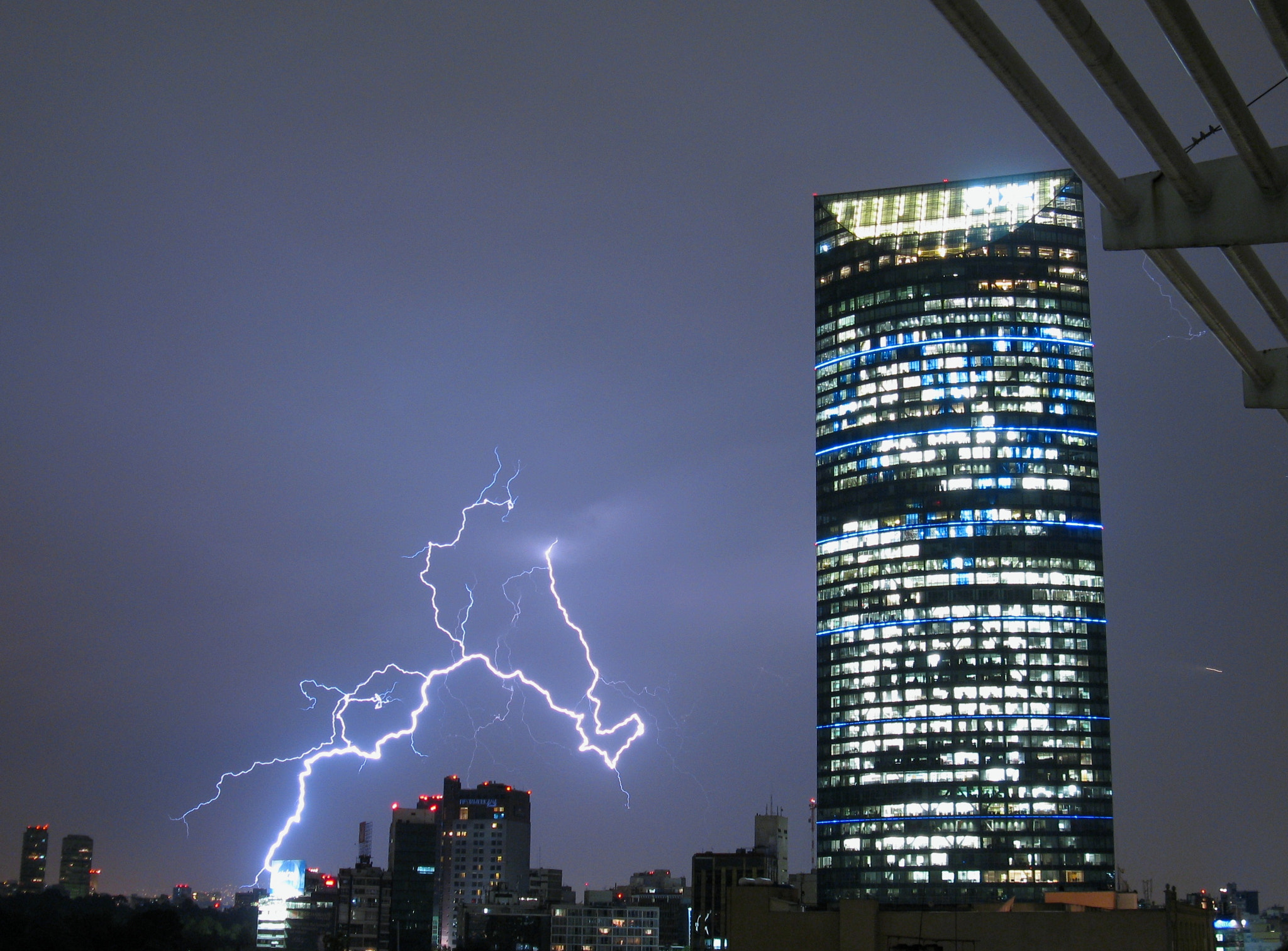
Lightning in the background of the Torre Mayor

Mexico City

Climate chart (precipitation, max. and min. temperature)
J	F	M	A	M	J	J	A	S	O	N	D
12 22 9	5.7 24 10	12 26 11	24 28 13	59 27 14	133 26 14	174 25 13	176 25 13	158 24 13	71 24 12	17 23 10	5 22 9
- █ Average max. and min. temperatures in °C
- █ Precipitation totals in mm
Imperial conversion
J	F	M	A	M	J	J	A	S	O	N	D
0.5 72 47	0.2 76 49	0.5 79 52	1 82 56	2.3 81 57	5.2 78 57	6.9 76 55	6.9 76 56	6.2 75 56	2.8 74 53	0.7 73 50	0.2 72 47
- █ Average max. and min. temperatures in °F
- █ Precipitation totals in inches

Mexico City has a subtropical highland climate (Köppen climate classification Cwb), due to its tropical location but high elevation. The lower region of the valley receives less rainfall than the upper regions of the south; the lower boroughs of Iztapalapa, Iztacalco, Venustiano Carranza and the east portion of Gustavo A. Madero are usually drier and warmer than the upper southern boroughs of Tlalpan and Milpa Alta, a mountainous region of pine and oak trees known as the range of Ajusco. The average annual temperature varies from 12 to 16 °C (54 to 61 °F), depending on the altitude of the borough. The temperature is rarely below 3 °C (37 °F) or above 30 °C (86 °F). At the Tacubaya observatory, the lowest temperature ever registered was −4.4 °C (24 °F) on 13 February 1960, and the highest temperature on record was 34.7 °C (94.5 °F) on 25 May 2024. Overall precipitation is heavily concentrated in the summer months, and includes dense hail.

Snow falls in the city scarcely, although somewhat more often on nearby mountaintops. Throughout its history, the Central Valley of Mexico was accustomed to having several snowfalls per decade (including a period between 1878 and 1895 in which every single year—except 1880—recorded snowfalls), mostly lake-effect snow. The effects of the draining of Lake Texcoco and global warming have greatly reduced snowfalls after the snow flurries of 12 February 1907. Since 1908, snow has only fallen thrice: snow on 14 February 1920; snow flurries on 14 March 1940; and on 12 January 1967, when 8 centimeters (3 in) of snow fell on the city, the most on record. The 1967 snowstorm coincided with the operation of Deep Drainage System that resulted in the total draining of what was left of Lake Texcoco. After the disappearance of Lake Texcoco, snow has never fallen again over Mexico City. The region of the Valley of Mexico receives anti-cyclonic systems. The weak winds of these systems do not allow for the dispersion, outside the basin, of the air pollutants which are produced by the 50,000 industries and 4 million vehicles operating in and around the metropolitan area.

The area receives about 820 millimeters (32 in) of annual rainfall, which is concentrated from May through October with little or no precipitation for the remainder of the year. The area has two main seasons. The wet humid summer runs from May to October when winds bring in tropical moisture from the sea, the wettest month being July. The cool sunny winter runs from November to April, when the air is relatively drier, the driest month being December. This season is subdivided into a cold winter period and a warm spring period. The cold period spans from November to February, when polar air masses push down from the north and keep the air fairly dry. The warm period extends from March to May when subtropical winds again dominate but do not yet carry enough moisture for rain to form.

Climate data for Ciudad de México (Tacubaya), normals 1991–2020, extremes 1877–2024
Month	Jan	Feb	Mar	Apr	May	Jun	Jul	Aug	Sep	Oct	Nov	Dec	Year
Record high °C (°F)	28.2 (82.8)	33.5 (92.3)	32.9 (91.2)	33.7 (92.7)	34.7 (94.5)	33.5 (92.3)	29.6 (85.3)	29.4 (84.9)	28.6 (83.5)	29.2 (84.6)	31.5 (88.7)	29.4 (84.9)	34.7 (94.5)
Mean daily maximum °C (°F)	22.4 (72.3)	24.3 (75.7)	26.1 (79.0)	27.5 (81.5)	27.2 (81.0)	25.8 (78.4)	24.7 (76.5)	24.6 (76.3)	23.7 (74.7)	23.5 (74.3)	22.8 (73.0)	22.4 (72.3)	24.6 (76.3)
Daily mean °C (°F)	15.4 (59.7)	16.9 (62.4)	18.6 (65.5)	20.3 (68.5)	20.4 (68.7)	19.8 (67.6)	18.8 (65.8)	18.9 (66.0)	18.4 (65.1)	17.6 (63.7)	16.4 (61.5)	15.4 (59.7)	18.1 (64.6)
Mean daily minimum °C (°F)	8.5 (47.3)	9.5 (49.1)	11.1 (52.0)	13.1 (55.6)	13.7 (56.7)	13.8 (56.8)	13.0 (55.4)	13.2 (55.8)	13.1 (55.6)	11.8 (53.2)	9.9 (49.8)	8.5 (47.3)	11.6 (52.9)
Record low °C (°F)	−4.2 (24.4)	−4.4 (24.1)	−4.0 (24.8)	−0.6 (30.9)	3.7 (38.7)	0.0 (32.0)	1.0 (33.8)	1.0 (33.8)	1.0 (33.8)	0.0 (32.0)	−3.0 (26.6)	−3.0 (26.6)	−4.4 (24.1)
Average precipitation mm (inches)	11.9 (0.47)	5.7 (0.22)	11.8 (0.46)	24.2 (0.95)	59.4 (2.34)	132.5 (5.22)	174.0 (6.85)	175.6 (6.91)	158.1 (6.22)	71.3 (2.81)	17.4 (0.69)	5.0 (0.20)	846.9 (33.34)
Average precipitation days (≥ 0.1 mm)	2.7	2.1	3.8	6.7	11.1	16.3	21.8	20.8	18.2	10.1	3.7	1.2	118.5
Average relative humidity (%)	54.0	48.0	43.5	45.2	52.8	63.7	69.6	69.2	69.9	64.0	57.1	55.3	57.7
Mean monthly sunshine hours	233.4	232.5	262.3	238.6	232.2	180.9	178.6	176.9	148.3	190.9	224.4	226.9	2,525.8
Source 1: Servicio Meteorológico Nacional
Source 2: World Meteorological Organization (humidity and sun 1981–2010)

== Demographics ==
Historical population
Year	Pop.	±%
1900	541,516	—
1950	3,365,081	+521.4%
1960	5,479,184	+62.8%
1970	8,830,947	+61.2%
1980	13,027,620	+47.5%
1990	15,642,318	+20.1%
2000	18,457,027	+18.0%
2010	20,136,681	+9.1%
2019	21,671,908	+7.6%
for Mexico City agglomeration

Historically, and since Pre-Columbian times, the Valley of Anahuac has been one of the most densely populated areas in Mexico. When the Federal District was created in 1824, the urban area of Mexico City extended approximately to the area of today's Cuauhtémoc borough.

During the Porfiriato era at the beginning of the 20th century, the wealthy and middle class began migrating to the west and south of the city's periphery. This led to a class divide between the upper and lower classes of Mexico City. The wealthy neighborhoods such as Colonia Roma, Polanco, and Anzures were located on the western side of the city near the historic center, while the working-class neighborhoods were located on the eastern side on the lakebed of former Lake Texcoco. Over the 20th century, this led to the creation of less developed settlements like Iztapalapa and Tláhuac in the east.

According to the 1921 census, 54.78% of the city's population was considered Mestizo (Indigenous mixed with European), 22.79% considered European, and 18.74% considered Indigenous.

Up to the 1990s, the Federal District was the most populous federal entity in Mexico, but since then, its population has remained stable at around 8.7 million. The growth of the city has extended beyond the limits of the city proper to 59 municipalities of the State of Mexico and 1 in the state of Hidalgo. With a population of approximately 19.8 million inhabitants (2008), it is one of the most populous conurbations in the world. Nonetheless, the annual rate of growth of the Metropolitan Area of Mexico City is much lower than that of other large urban agglomerations in Mexico, a phenomenon most likely attributable to the environmental policy of decentralization. The net migration rate of Mexico City from 1995 to 2000 was negative.

=== Metropolitan area ===
Greater Mexico City and Mexico City

The metropolitan area, Greater Mexico City ('Zona Metropolitana del Valle de México' or 'ZMVM' in Spanish) consists of Mexico City itself plus 60 municipalities in the State of Mexico and one in Hidalgo state. With a population of 21,804,515 (2020 census), Greater Mexico City is both the biggest and the densest metropolitan area in the country. Of the ca. 21.8 million, 9.2 million live in Mexico City proper and 12.4 million in the State of Mexico (ca. 75% of the state's population), including the municipalities of:

- Ecatepec de Morelos (pop. 1,645,352)
- Nezahualcóyotl (pop. 1,077,208)
- Naucalpan (pop. 834,434)
- Chimalhuacán (pop. 705,193)
- Tlalnepantla de Baz (pop. 672,202)

==== Megalopolis ====
The Mexico City Megalopolis as defined prior to 2019. Since then Querétaro state is also included.

Greater Mexico City, in turn, forms part of an even larger megalopolis officially known as the Corona regional del centro de México (Mexico City megalopolis), with a population of 33.4 million, more than one quarter of the country's population according to the 2020 census. The megalopolis as defined by the Environmental Commission of the Megalopolis (CAMe) covers Mexico City and the states of Mexico, Hidalgo, Puebla, Tlaxcala, Morelos, and since 2019, Querétaro, thus encompassing the metropolitan areas of Mexico City, Puebla, Querétaro, Toluca, Cuernavaca, Pachuca, and others.

==== Growth ====
Greater Mexico City was the fastest growing metropolitan area in the country until the late 1980s. Since then, government policies have supported decentralization with the aim of reducing pollution in Greater Mexico City. While still growing, the annual rate of growth has decreased and is lower than that of Greater Guadalajara and Greater Monterrey.

The net migration rate of Mexico City proper from 1995 to 2000 was negative, which implies that residents are moving to the suburbs of the metropolitan area, or to other states of Mexico. In addition, some inner suburbs are losing population to outer suburbs, indicating the continuing expansion of Greater Mexico City.

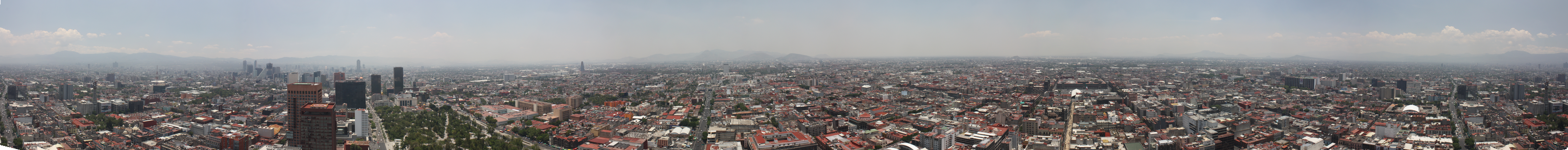
Panorama of Mexico City from Torre Latinoamericana

=== Religion ===
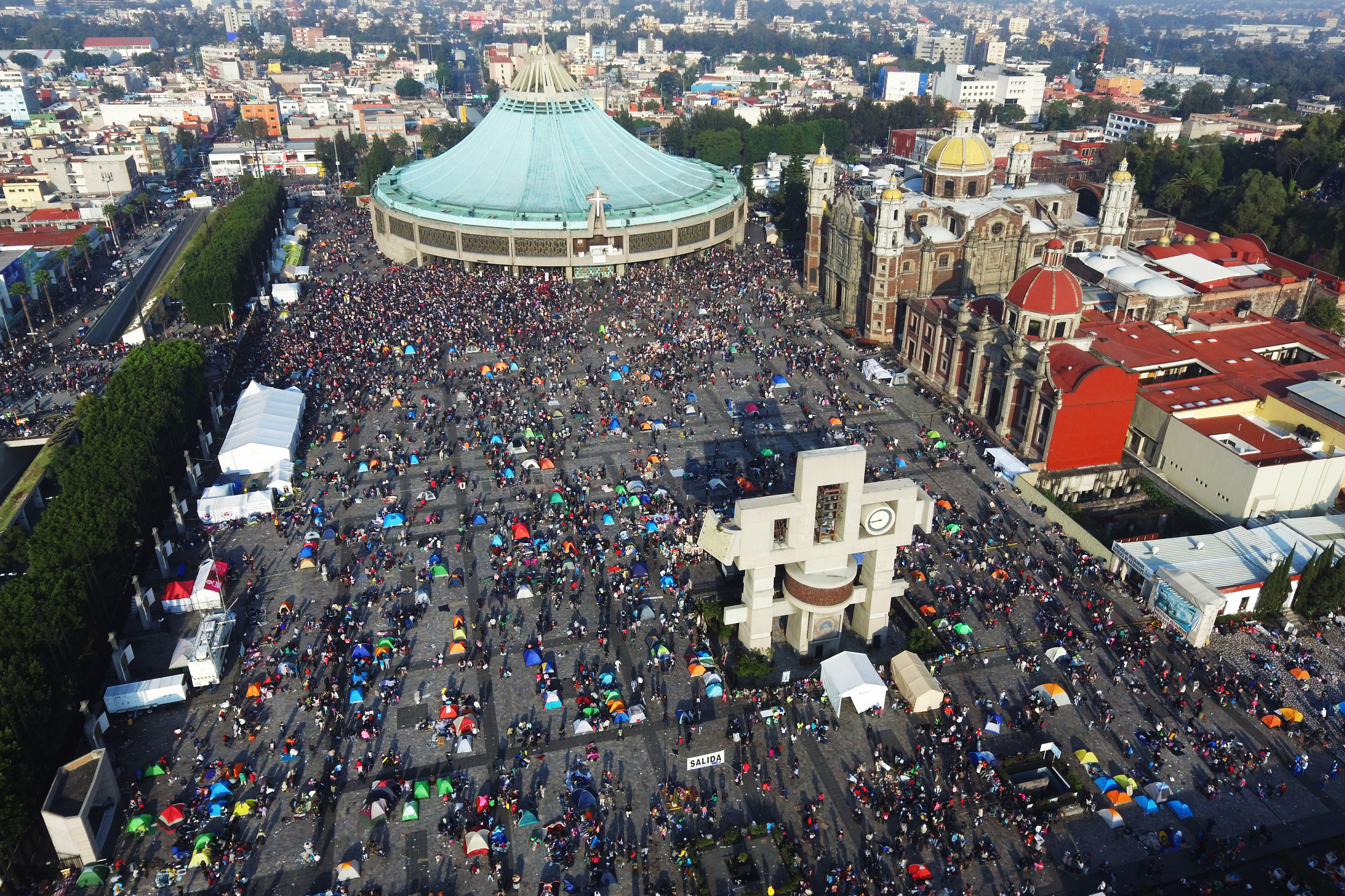
Basilica of Our Lady of Guadalupe in La Villa de Guadalupe, the main Catholic pilgrimage site in the Americas. It houses the original image of Our Lady of Guadalupe.

The majority (82%) of the residents in Mexico City are Catholic, slightly lower than the 2010 census national percentage of 87%, making it the largest Christian denomination, though it has been decreasing over the last decades. Many other religions and philosophies are also practiced in the city: many different types of Protestant groups, different types of Jewish communities, Buddhist, Islamic and other spiritual and philosophical groups. There are also growing numbers of irreligious people, whether agnostic or atheist. The patron saint of Mexico City is Saint Philip of Jesus, a Mexican Catholic missionary who became one of the Twenty-six Martyrs of Japan.

The Roman Catholic Archdiocese of Mexico is the largest archdiocese in the world. There are two Catholic cathedrals in the city, the Mexico City Metropolitan Cathedral and the Iztapalapa Cathedral, and three former Catholic churches who are now the cathedrals of other rites, the San José de Gracia Cathedral (Anglican church), the Porta Coeli Cathedral (Melkite Greek Catholic church) and the Valvanera Cathedral (Maronite church).

=== Ethnic groups ===
Representing around 18.74% of the city's population, indigenous peoples from different areas of Mexico have migrated to the capital in search of better economic opportunities. Nahuatl, Otomi, Mixtec, Zapotec and Mazahua are the indigenous languages with the greatest number of speakers in Mexico City. According to the 2020 Census, 2.03% of Mexico City's population identified as Black, Afro-Mexican, or of African descent.

Additionally, Mexico City is home to large communities of expatriates and immigrants from the rest of North America (U.S. and Canada), from South America (mainly from Argentina and Colombia, but also from Brazil, Chile, Uruguay and Venezuela), from Central America and the Caribbean (mainly from Cuba, Guatemala, El Salvador, Haiti and Honduras); from Europe (mainly from Spain, Germany and Switzerland, but also from Czech Republic, Hungary, France, Italy, Ireland, the Netherlands, Poland and Romania), and from the Arab world (mostly from Lebanon, and other countries like Syria and Egypt).

Mexico City is home to the largest population of Americans living outside the United States. Estimates are as high as 700,000 Americans living in Mexico City, while in 1999 the U.S. Bureau of Consular Affairs estimated over 440,000 Americans lived in the Mexico City Metropolitan Area.

=== Health ===
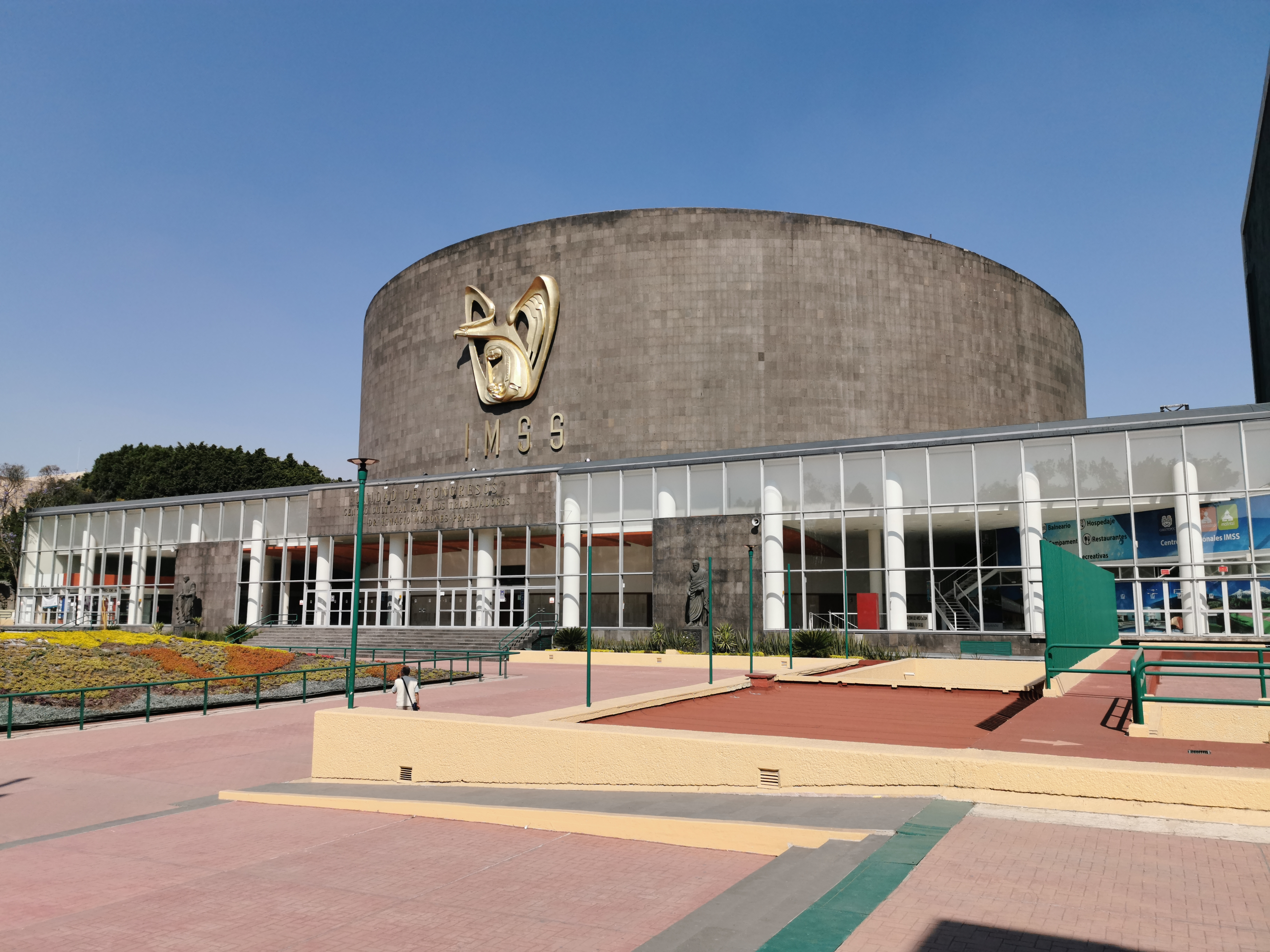
The XXI Century National Medical Center, managed by the Mexican Social Security Institute (IMSS)

Mexico City is home to some of the best private hospitals in the country, including Hospital Ángeles, Hospital ABC and Médica Sur. The national public healthcare institution for private-sector employees, IMSS, has its largest facilities in Mexico City—including the National Medical Center and the La Raza Medical Center—and has an annual budget of over 6 billion pesos. The IMSS and other public health institutions, including the ISSSTE (Public Sector Employees' Social Security Institute) and the National Health Ministry (SSA) maintain large specialty facilities in the city. These include the National Institutes of Cardiology, Nutrition, Psychiatry, Oncology, Pediatrics, Rehabilitation, among others.

=== Education ===
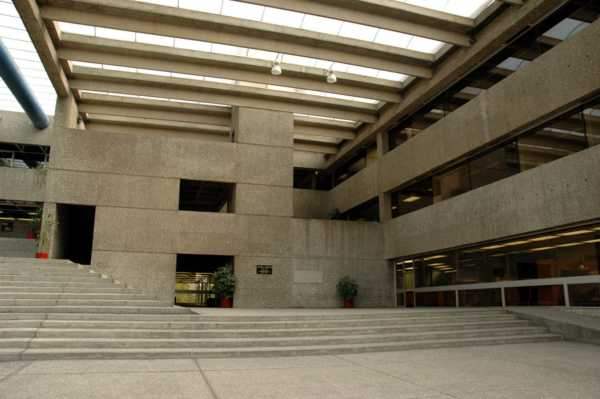
El Colegio de México dedicated to higher education and research in the social sciences and humanities, with a particular emphasis on Mexican and Latin American studies.

Among its many public and private schools (K–13), the city offers multi-cultural, multi-lingual and international schools attended by Mexican and foreign students. Best known are the Colegio Alemán (German school with three main campuses), the Liceo Mexicano Japonés (Japanese), the Centro Cultural Coreano en México (Korean), the Lycée Franco-Mexicain (French), the American School, The Westhill Institute (American School), the Edron Academy and the Greengates School (British). Mexico City joined the UNESCO Global Network of Learning Cities in 2015 and was designated a "Design City" in 2017.

In the Plaza de las Tres Culturas is the Colegio de Santa Cruz de Tlatelolco that is recognized for being the first and oldest European school of higher learning in the Americas and the first major school of interpreters and translators in the New World. Other, the now-defunct Royal and Pontifical University of Mexico is considered the father of the UNAM, and it was located in the city and was the third oldest university in the Americas.

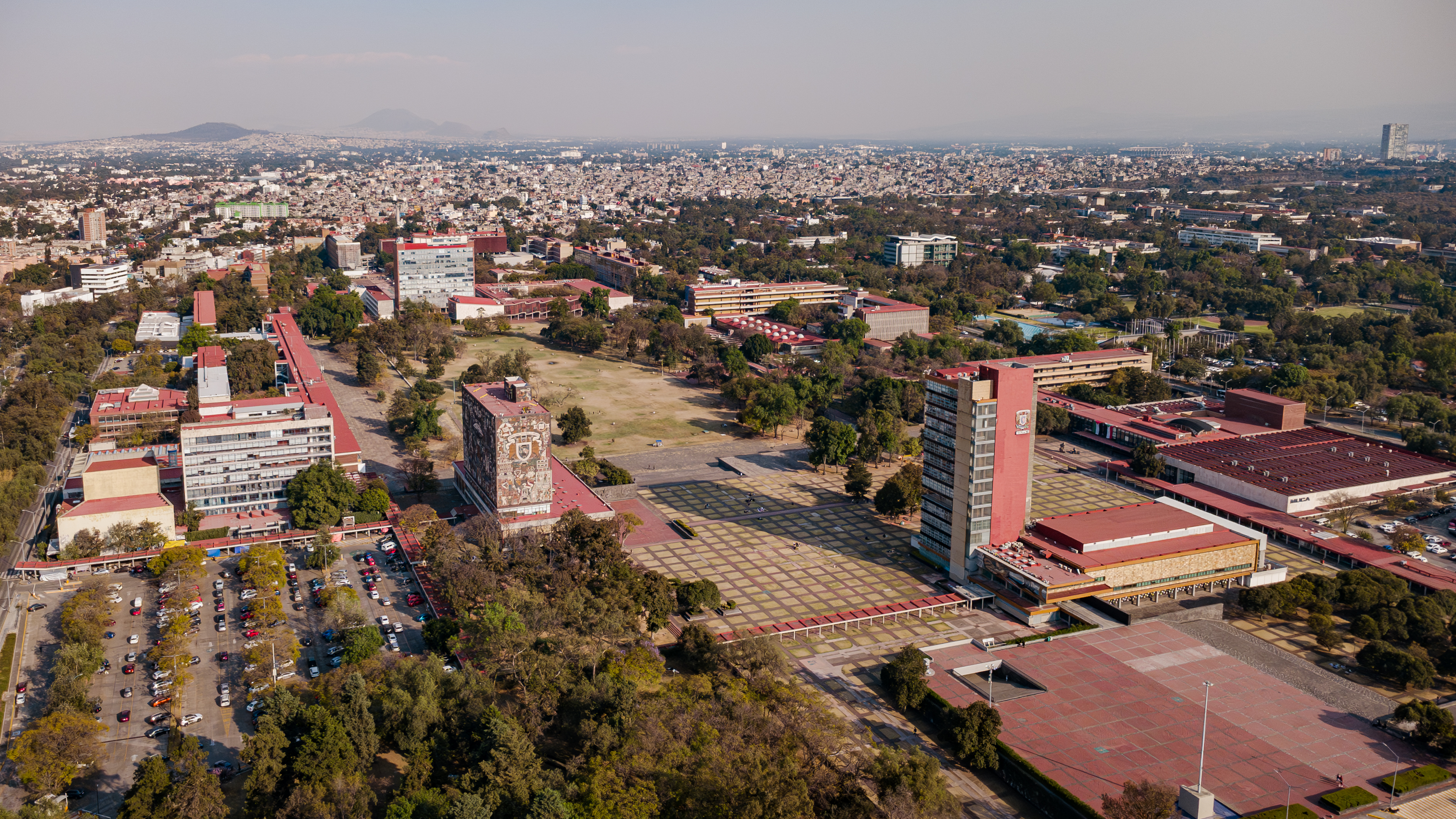
Central Campus of the University City of the UNAM. Since 2007 the University City is a UNESCO World Heritage Site.

The National Autonomous University of Mexico (UNAM), located in Mexico City, is the largest university on the continent, with more than 300,000 students from all backgrounds. Three Nobel laureates, several Mexican entrepreneurs and most of Mexico's modern-day presidents are among its former students. UNAM conducts 50% of Mexico's scientific research and has presence all across the country with satellite campuses, observatories and research centers. UNAM ranked 74th in the Top 200 World University Ranking published by Times Higher Education (then called Times Higher Education Supplement) in 2006, making it the highest ranked Spanish-speaking university in the world. The sprawling main campus of the university, known as Ciudad Universitaria, was named a World Heritage Site by UNESCO in 2007.

The second largest higher-education institution is the National Polytechnic Institute (IPN), which includes among many other relevant centers the Centro de Investigación y de Estudios Avanzados (Cinvestav), where varied high-level scientific and technological research is done. Other major higher-education institutions in the city include the Metropolitan Autonomous University (UAM), the National School of Anthropology and History (ENAH), the Instituto Tecnológico Autónomo de México (ITAM), the Monterrey Institute of Technology and Higher Education (3 campuses), the Universidad Panamericana (UP), the Universidad La Salle, the Universidad Intercontinental (UIC), the Universidad del Valle de México (UVM), the Universidad Anáhuac, Simón Bolívar University (USB), the Universidad Intercontinental (UIC), the Alliant International University, the Universidad Iberoamericana, El Colegio de México (Colmex), Escuela Libre de Derecho and the Centro de Investigación y Docencia Económica, (CIDE). In addition, the prestigious University of California maintains a campus known as "Casa de California" in the city. The Universidad Tecnológica de México is also in Mexico City.

== Politics ==
=== Political structure ===
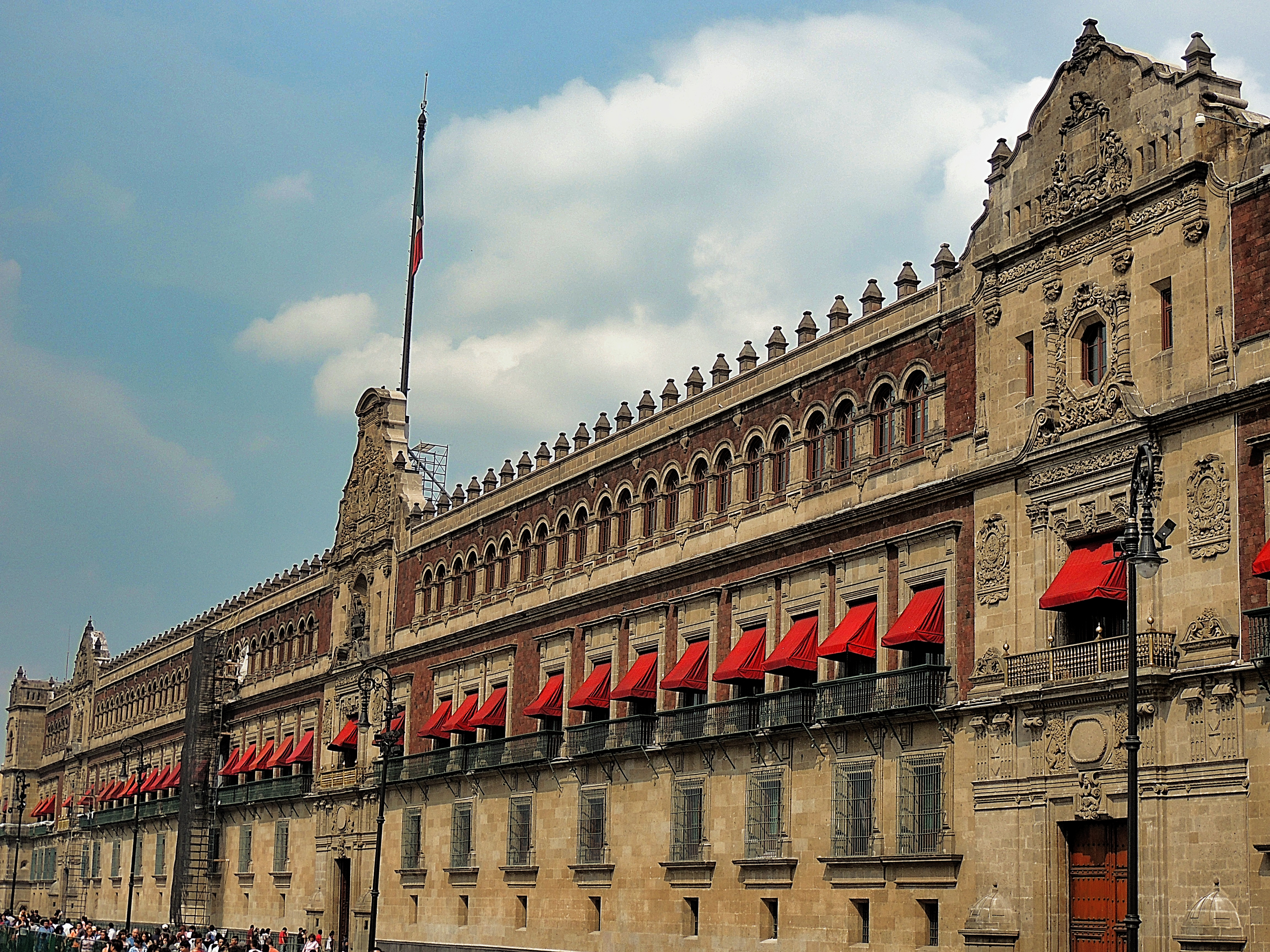
The National Palace of Mexico

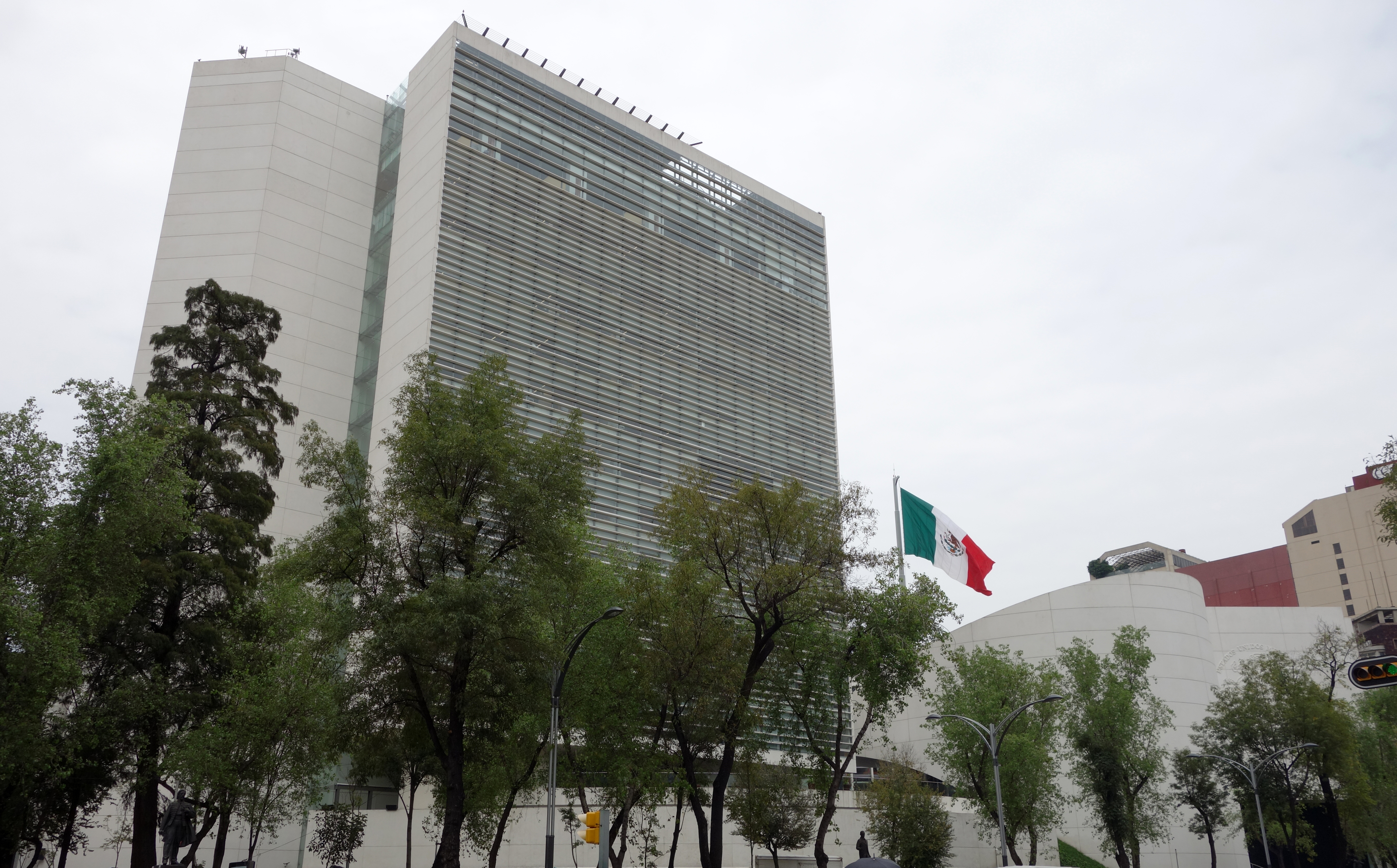
Senate of the Republic

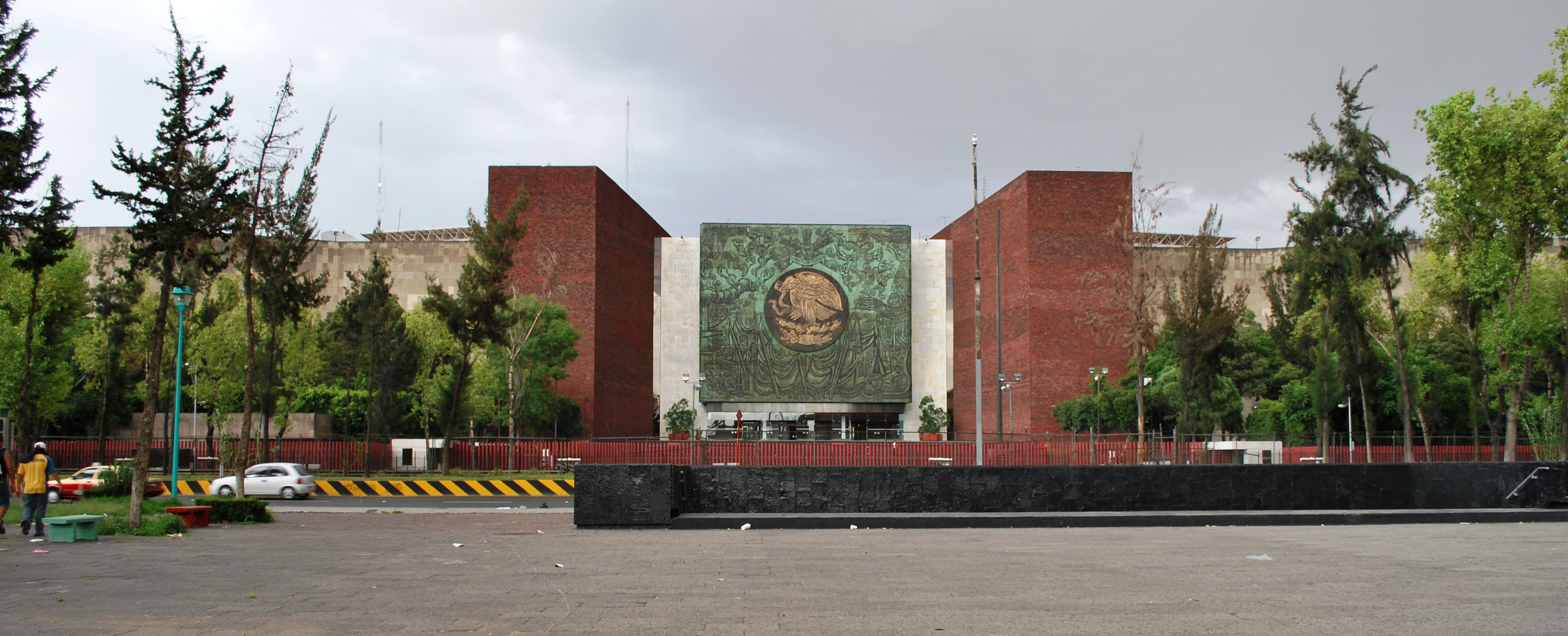
Legislative Palace of San Lázaro

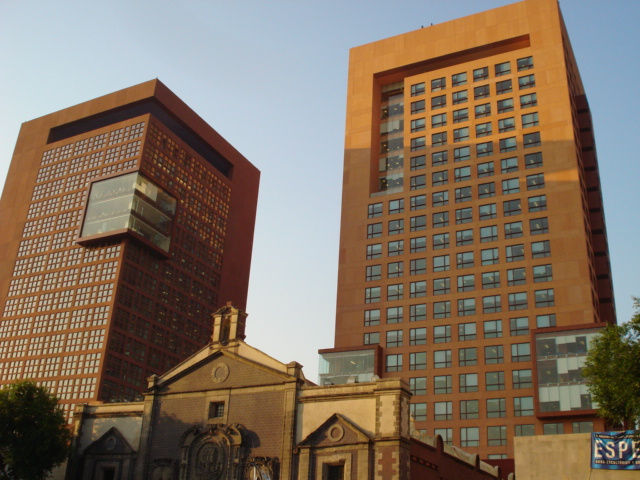
Offices of the Secretariat of Foreign Affairs

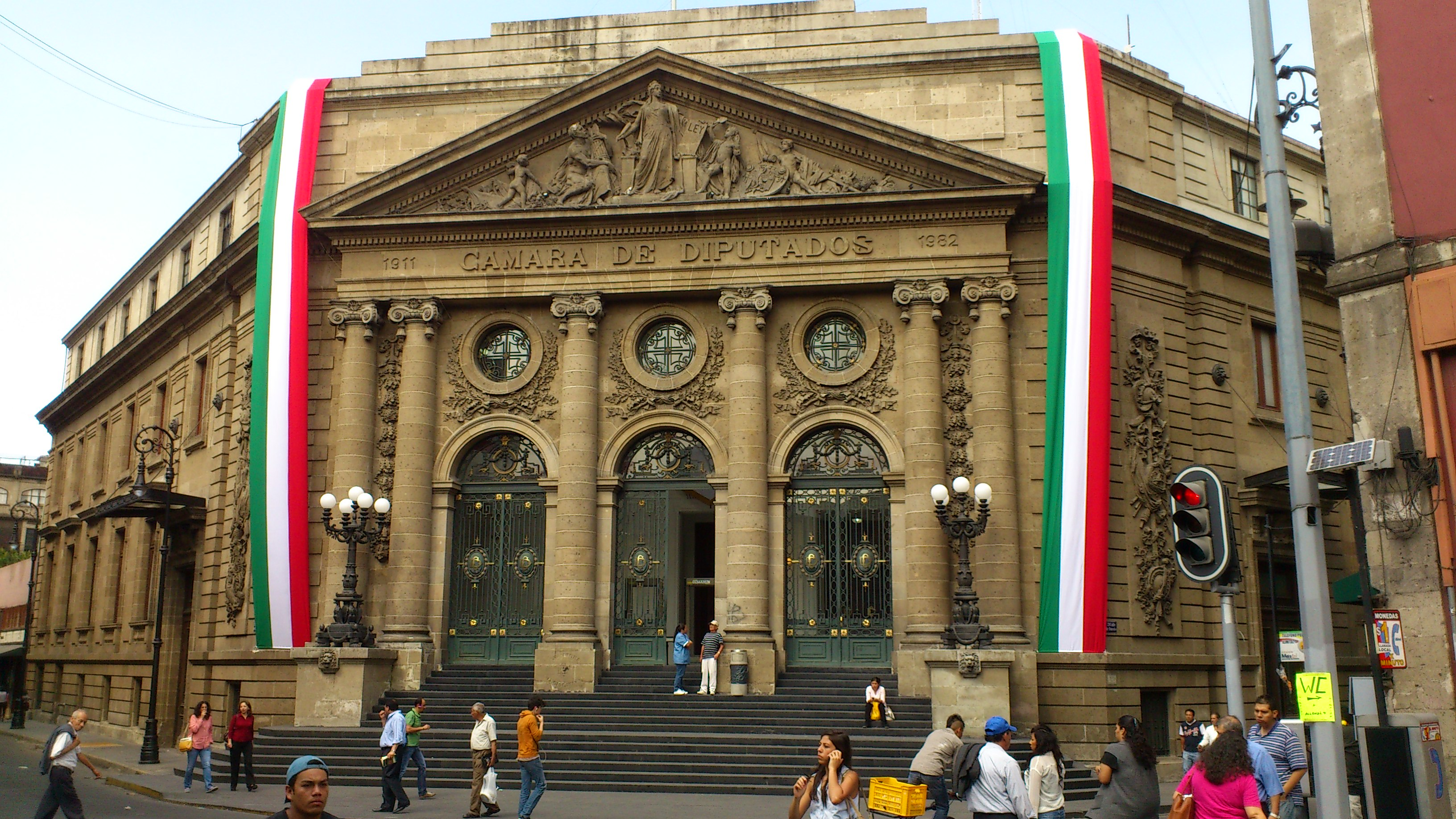
Mexico City's Legislative Assembly building

The Acta Constitutiva de la Federación of 31 January 1824, and the Federal Constitution of 4 October 1824, fixed the political and administrative organization of the United Mexican States after the Mexican War of Independence. In addition, Section XXVIII of Article 50 gave the new Congress the right to choose where the federal government would be located. This location would then be appropriated as federal land, with the federal government acting as the local authority. The two main candidates to become the capital were Mexico City and Querétaro.

Due in large part to the persuasion of representative Servando Teresa de Mier, Mexico City was chosen because it was the center of the country's population and history, even though Querétaro was closer to the center geographically. The choice was official on 18 November 1824, and Congress delineated a surface area of two leagues square (8,800 acres) centered on the Zocalo. This area was then separated from the State of Mexico, forcing that state's government to move from the Palace of the Inquisition (now Museum of Mexican Medicine) in the city to Texcoco. This area did not include the population centers of the towns of Coyoacán, Xochimilco, Mexicaltzingo and Tlalpan, all of which remained as part of the State of Mexico.

In 1854 president Antonio López de Santa Anna enlarged the area of Mexico City almost eightfold from the original 220 to 1,700 km^{2} (80 to 660 sq mi), annexing the rural and mountainous areas to secure the strategic mountain passes to the south and southwest to protect the city in the event of a foreign invasion. (The Mexican–American War had just been fought.) The last changes to the limits of Mexico City were made between 1898 and 1902, reducing the area to the current 1,479 km^{2} (571 sq mi) by adjusting the southern border with the state of Morelos. By that time, the total number of municipalities within Mexico City was twenty-two. In 1941, the General Anaya borough was merged with the Central Department, which was then renamed "Mexico City" (thus reviving the name but not the autonomous municipality). From 1941 to 1970, the Federal District comprised twelve delegaciones and Mexico City. In 1970, Mexico City was split into four different delegaciones: Cuauhtémoc, Miguel Hidalgo, Venustiano Carranza and Benito Juárez, increasing the number of delegaciones to 16. Since then, the whole Federal District, whose delegaciones had by then almost formed a single urban area, began to be considered de facto a synonym of Mexico City.

The lack of a de jure stipulation left a legal vacuum that led to a number of sterile discussions about whether one concept had engulfed the other or if the latter had ceased to exist altogether. In 1993, the situation was solved by an amendment to the 44th article of the Constitution of Mexico; Mexico City and the Federal District were stated to be the same entity. The amendment was later introduced into the second article of the Statute of Government of the Federal District.

=== Reforms ===
On 29 January 2016, Mexico City ceased to be the Federal District (Spanish: Distrito Federal or D.F.), and was officially renamed "Ciudad de México" (or "CDMX"). On that date, Mexico City began a transition to becoming the country's 32nd federal entity, giving it a level of autonomy comparable to that of a state. It will have its own constitution and its legislature, and its delegaciones will now be headed by mayors. Because of a clause in the Mexican Constitution, however, as it is the seat of the powers of the federation, it can never become a state, or the capital of the country has to be relocated elsewhere.

In response to the demands, Mexico City received a greater degree of autonomy, with the 1987 elaboration the first Statute of Government (Estatuto de Gobierno) and the creation of an assembly of representatives. The city has a Statute of Government, and as of its ratification on 31 January 2017, a constitution, similar to the states of the Union. As part of the recent changes in autonomy, the budget is administered locally; it is proposed by the head of government and approved by the Legislative Assembly. Nonetheless, it is the Congress of the Union that sets the ceiling to internal and external public debt issued by the city government.

The politics pursued by the administrations of heads of government in Mexico City at the end of the 20th century have usually been more liberal than those of the rest of the country, whether with the support of the federal government, as was the case with the approval of several comprehensive environmental laws in the 1980s, or by laws that were since approved by the Legislative Assembly. The Legislative Assembly expanded provisions on abortions, becoming the first federal entity to expand abortion in Mexico beyond cases of rape and economic reasons, to permit it at the choice of the mother before the 12th week of pregnancy. In December 2009, the then Federal District became the first city in Latin America and one of very few in the world to legalize same-sex marriage.

=== Boroughs and neighborhoods ===
The 16 boroughs of Mexico City

After the political reforms in 2016, the city is divided for administrative purposes into 16 boroughs (demarcaciones territoriales, colloquially alcaldías), formerly called delegaciones. While they are not fully equivalent to municipalities, the boroughs have gained significant autonomy. Formerly appointed by the Federal District's head of government, local authorities were first elected directly by plurality in 2000. From 2016, each borough is headed by a mayor, expanding their local government powers.

The boroughs of Mexico City with their 2020 populations are:

1. Álvaro Obregón (pop. 759,137)
2. Azcapotzalco (pop. 432,205)
3. Benito Juárez (pop. 434,153)
4. Coyoacán (pop. 614,447)
5. Cuajimalpa (pop. 217,686)
6. Cuauhtémoc (pop. 545,884)
7. Gustavo A. Madero (pop. 1,173,351)
8. Iztacalco (pop. 404,695)

9. Iztapalapa (pop. 1,835,486)
10. La Magdalena Contreras (pop. 247,622)
11. Miguel Hidalgo (pop. 414,470)
12. Milpa Alta (pop. 152,685)
13. Tláhuac (pop. 392,313)
14. Tlalpan (pop. 699,928)
15. Venustiano Carranza (pop. 443,704)
16. Xochimilco (pop. 442,178)

The Human Development Index report of 2005 shows that there were three boroughs with a very high Human Development Index, 12 with a high HDI value (9 above .85), and one with a medium HDI value (almost high). Benito Juárez borough had the highest HDI of the country (0.9510) followed by Miguel Hidalgo, which came up fourth nationally with an HDI of (0.9189), and Coyoacán was fifth nationally, with an HDI of (0.9169). Cuajimalpa (15th), Cuauhtémoc (23rd), and Azcapotzalco (25th) also had very high values of 0.8994, 0.8922, and 0.8915, respectively.

In contrast, the boroughs of Xochimilco (172nd), Tláhuac (177th), and Iztapalapa (183rd) presented the lowest HDI values of Mexico City, with values of 0.8481, 0.8473, and 0.8464, respectively, which are still in the global high-HDI range. The only borough that did not have a high HDI was that of rural Milpa Alta, which had a "medium" HDI of 0.7984, far below those of all the other boroughs (627th nationally, the rest being in the top 200). Mexico City's HDI for the 2005 report was 0.9012 (very high), and its 2010 value of 0.9225 (very high), or (by newer methodology) 0.8307, was Mexico's highest.

=== Law enforcement ===
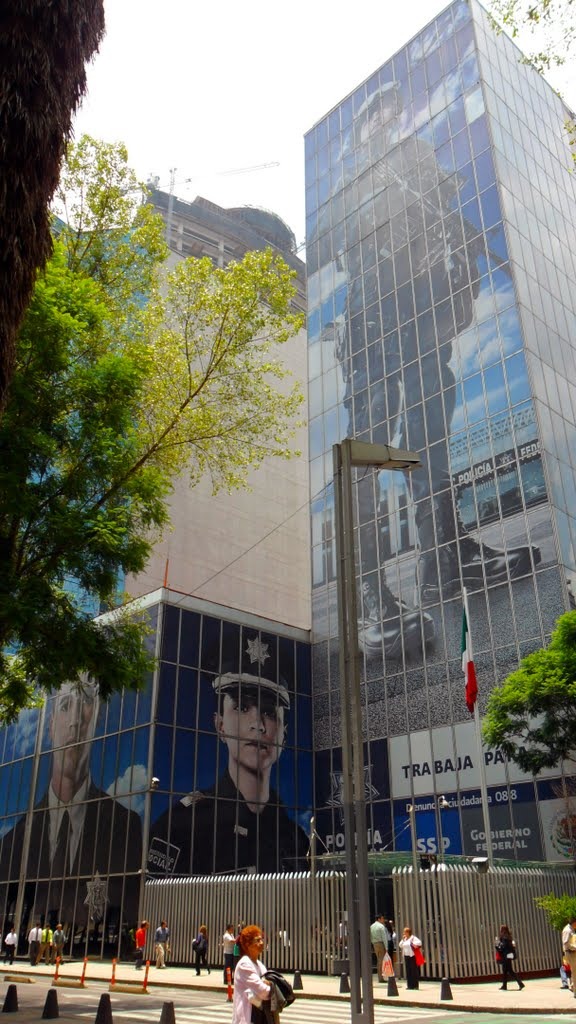
Federal Police headquarters in Mexico City

The Secretariat of Public Security of Mexico City (Secretaría de Seguridad Pública de la Ciudad de México – SSP) manages a combined force of over 90,000 officers in Mexico City. The SSP is charged with maintaining public order and safety in the heart of Mexico City. The historic district is also roamed by tourist police, aiming to orient and serve tourists. These horse-mounted agents dress in traditional uniforms. The investigative Judicial Police of Mexico City (Policía Judicial de la Ciudad de México – PJCDMX) is organized under the Office of the Attorney General of Mexico City (the Procuraduría General de Justicia de la Ciudad de México). The PGJCDMX maintains 16 precincts (delegaciones) with an estimated 3,500 judicial police, 1,100 investigating agents for prosecuting attorneys (agentes del ministerio público), and nearly 1,000 criminology experts or specialists (peritos).

Between 2000 and 2004 an average of 478 crimes were reported each day in Mexico City; however, the actual crime rate is thought to be much higher "since most people are reluctant to report crime". Under policies enacted by Mayor Marcelo Ebrard between 2009 and 2011, Mexico City underwent a major security upgrade with violent and petty crime rates both falling significantly despite the rise in violent crime in other parts of the country. Some of the policies enacted included the installation of 11,000 security cameras around the city and a very large expansion of the police force. Mexico City has one of the world's highest police officer-to-resident ratios, with one uniformed officer per 100 citizens. Since 1997 the prison population has increased by more than 500%. Political scientist Markus-Michael Müller argues that mostly informal street vendors are hit by these measures. He sees punishment "related to the growing politicization of security and crime issues and the resulting criminalization of the people living at the margins of urban society, in particular those who work in the city's informal economy".

In 2016, the incidence of femicides was 3.2 per 100 000 inhabitants, the national average being 4.2. A 2015 city government report found that two of three women over the age of 15 in the capital suffered some form of violence. In addition to street harassment, one of the places where women in Mexico City are subjected to violence is on and around public transport. Annually the Metro of Mexico City receives 300 complaints of sexual harassment.

=== International relations ===
Mexico City is twinned with:

- Cusco, Peru, 1987
- Chicago, United States, 1991
- Berlin, Germany, 1993
- Havana, Cuba, 1997
- Quito, Ecuador, 1999
- Tegucigalpa, Honduras, 1999
- San Antonio de los Baños, Cuba, 1999
- Cerro (Havana), Cuba, 1999
- San José, Costa Rica, 2000
- Buenos Aires, Argentina, 2006
- Nagoya, Japan, 2007
- Los Angeles, United States, 2007
- Cádiz, Spain, 2009
- Beijing, China, 2009
- Istanbul, Turkey, 2010
- Kuwait City, Kuwait, 2011

== Economy ==
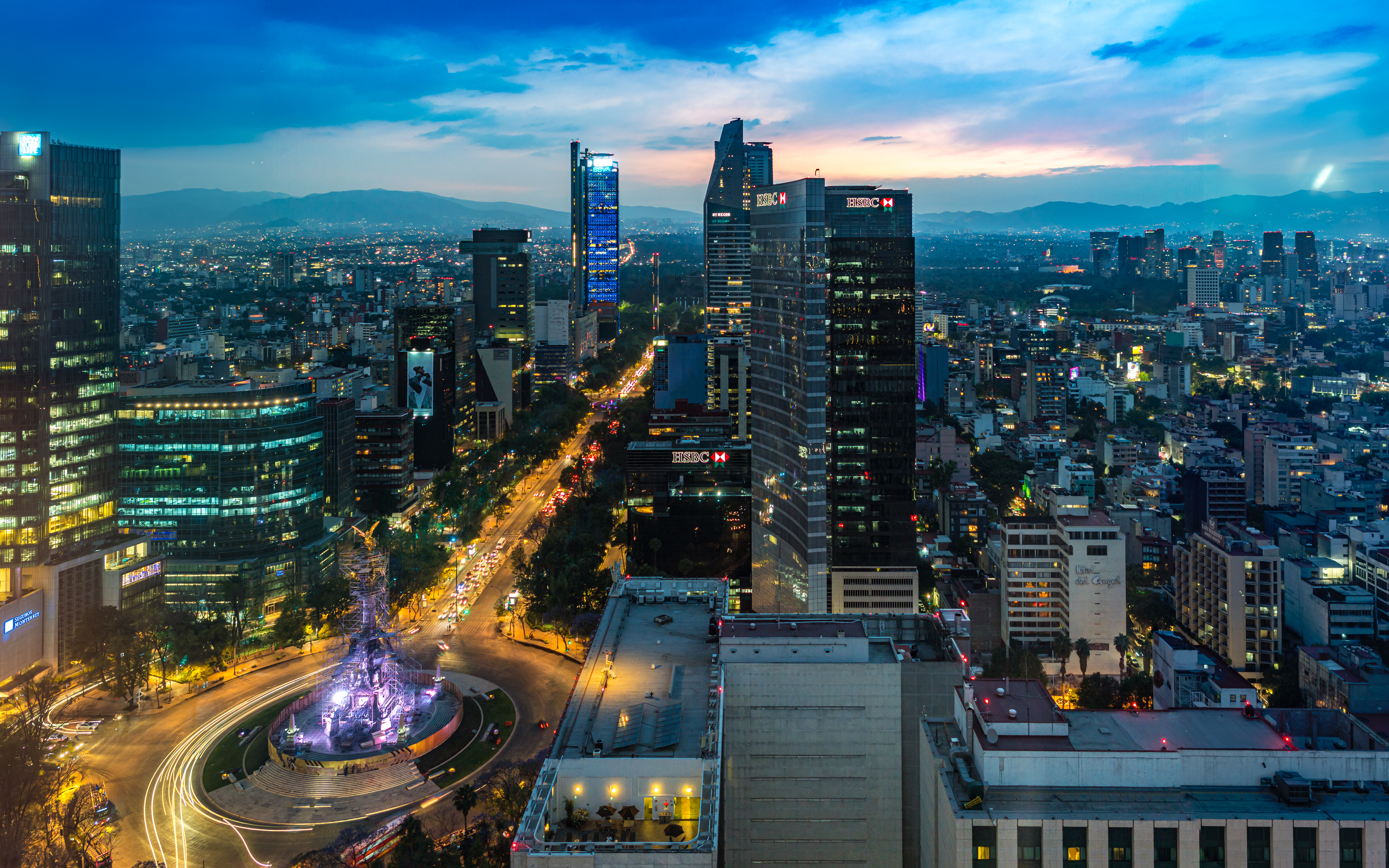
The Paseo de la Reforma is a wide avenue designed by Ferdinand von Rosenzweig in the 1860s and was modeled after the Champs-Élysées in Paris.

Mexico City is one of the most important economic hubs in Latin America. The city proper produces 15.8% of the country's gross domestic product. In 2002, Mexico City had a Human Development Index score of 0.915, identical to that of South Korea. In 2007, residents in the top twelve percent of GDP per capita holders in the city had a mean disposable income of US$98,517. The high spending power of Mexico City inhabitants makes the city attractive for companies offering prestige and luxury goods. According to a 2009 study conducted by PwC, Mexico City had a GDP of $390 billion, ranking it as the eighth richest city in the world and the richest in Latin America. In 2009, Mexico City alone would rank as the 30th largest economy in the world.

Mexico City is the greatest contributor to the country's industrial GDP (15.8%) and also the greatest contributor to the country's GDP in the service sector (25.3%). Due to the limited non-urbanized space at the south—most of which is protected through environmental laws—the contribution of Mexico City in agriculture is the smallest of all federal entities in the country. The economic reforms of President Carlos Salinas de Gortari had a tremendous effect on the city, as a number of businesses, including banks and airlines, were privatized. He also signed the North American Free Trade Agreement (NAFTA). This led to decentralization and a shift in Mexico City's economic base, from manufacturing to services, as most factories moved away to either the State of Mexico, or more commonly to the northern border. By contrast, corporate office buildings set their base in the city.

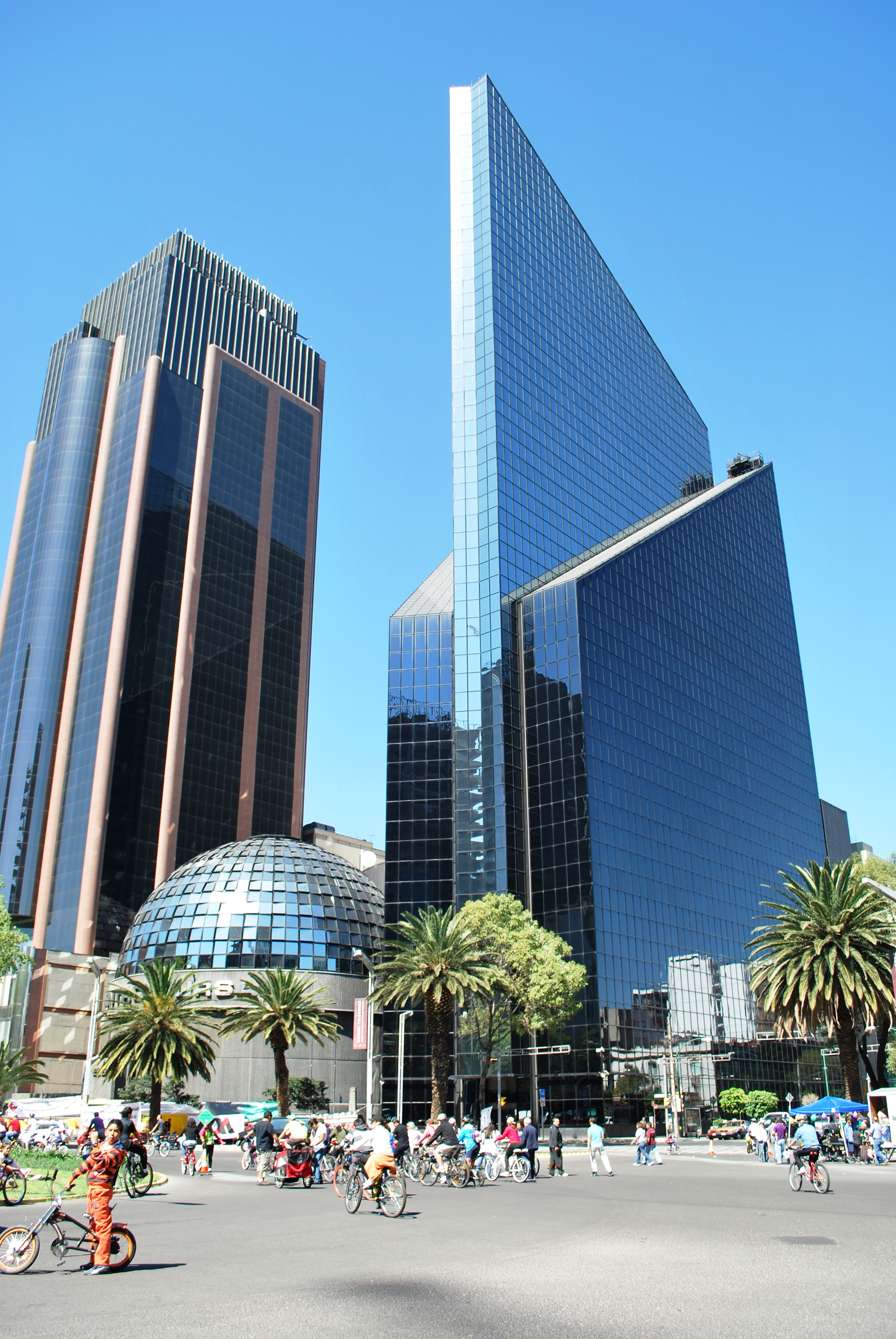
Mexican Stock Exchange

Mexico City offers a consumer retail market, ranging from basic foods to ultra high-end luxury goods. Consumers may buy in fixed indoor markets, in mobile markets (tianguis), from street vendors, from downtown shops in a street dedicated to a certain type of good, in convenience stores and traditional neighborhood stores, in modern supermarkets, in warehouse and membership stores and the shopping centers that they anchor, in department stores, in big-box stores, and in modern shopping malls. In addition, "tianguis" or mobile markets set up shop on streets in many neighborhoods, depending on day of week. Sundays see the largest number of these markets.

The city's main source of fresh produce is the Central de Abasto. This in itself is a self-contained mini-city in Iztapalapa borough covering an area equivalent to several dozen city blocks. The wholesale market supplies most of the city's "mercados", supermarkets and restaurants, as well as people who come to buy the produce for themselves. Tons of fresh produce are trucked in from all over Mexico every day. The principal fish market is known as La Nueva Viga, in the same complex as the Central de Abastos. The world-renowned market of Tepito occupies 25 blocks, and sells a variety of products. A staple for consumers in the city is the omnipresent "mercado". Every major neighborhood in the city has its own borough-regulated market, often more than one. These are large well-established facilities offering most basic products, such as fresh produce and meat/poultry, dry goods, tortillerías, and many other services such as locksmiths, herbal medicine, hardware goods, sewing implements; and a multitude of stands offering freshly made, home-style cooking and drinks in the tradition of aguas frescas and atole.

Street vendors ply their trade from stalls in the tianguis as well as at non-officially controlled concentrations around metro stations and hospitals; at plazas comerciales, where vendors of a certain "theme" (e.g. stationery) are housed; originally these were organized to accommodate vendors formerly selling on the street; or simply from improvised stalls on a city sidewalk. In addition, food and goods are sold from people walking with baskets, pushing carts, from bicycles or the backs of trucks, or simply from a tarp or cloth laid on the ground. In the center of the city informal street vendors are increasingly targeted by laws and prosecution. The weekly San Felipe de Jesús Tianguis is reported to be the largest in Latin America.

The Historic Center of Mexico City is widely known for specialized, often low-cost retailers. Certain blocks or streets are dedicated to shops selling a certain type of merchandise, with areas dedicated to over 40 categories such as home appliances, lamps and electricals, closets and bathrooms, housewares, wedding dresses, jukeboxes, printing, office furniture and safes, books, photography, jewelry, and opticians.

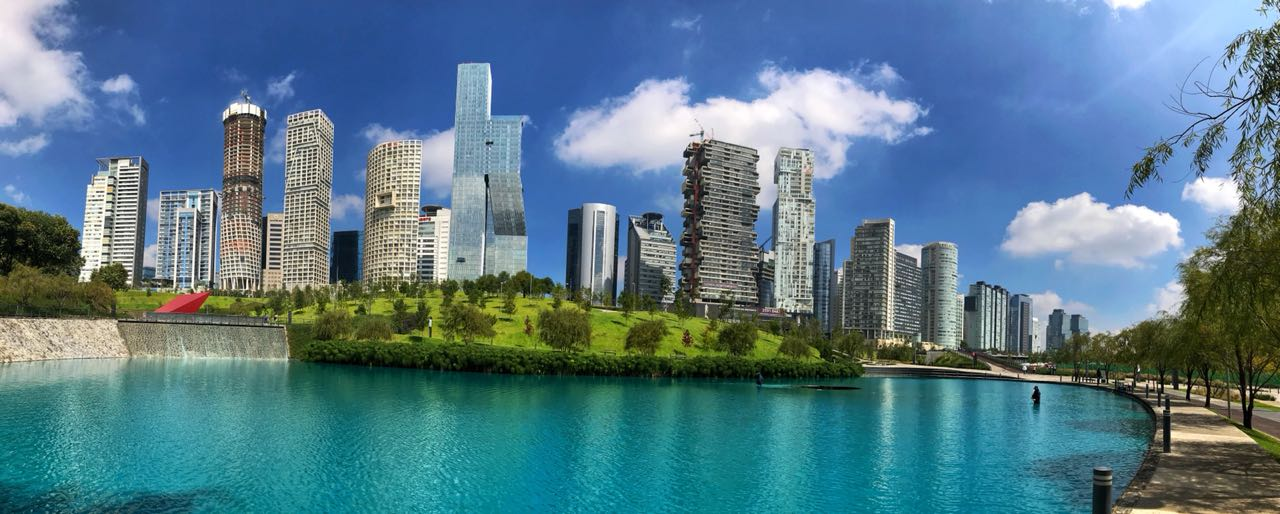
Santa Fe is one of the centers of greatest economic activity in the city.

=== Tourism ===
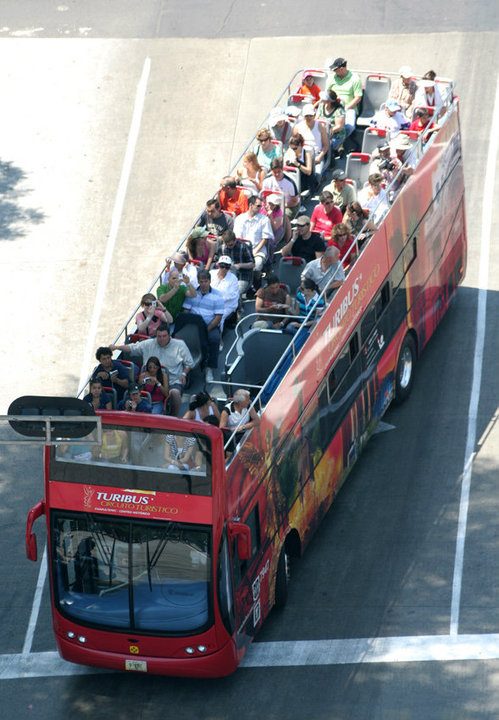
The Turibus runs through many of the most important tourist attractions in the city.

Mexico City is a destination for many foreign tourists. The Historic center of Mexico City (Centro Histórico) and the "floating gardens" of Xochimilco in the southern borough have been declared World Heritage Sites by UNESCO. Landmarks in the Historic Center include the Plaza de la Constitución (Zócalo), the main central square with its epoch-contrasting Spanish-era Metropolitan Cathedral and National Palace, ancient Aztec temple ruins Templo Mayor ("Major Temple") and modern structures, all within a few steps of one another. (The Templo Mayor was discovered in 1978 while workers were digging to place underground electric cables).

The most recognizable icon of Mexico City is the golden Angel of Independence on the wide, elegant avenue Paseo de la Reforma, modeled by the order of the Emperor Maximilian of Mexico after the Champs-Élysées in Paris. This avenue was designed over the Americas' oldest known major roadway in the 19th century to connect the National Palace (seat of government) with the Castle of Chapultepec, the imperial residence. Today, this avenue is an important financial district in which the Mexican Stock Exchange and several corporate headquarters are located. Another important avenue is the Avenida de los Insurgentes, which extends 28.8 km (17.9 mi) and is one of the longest single avenues in the world.

Chapultepec Park houses the Chapultepec Castle, now a museum on a hill that overlooks the park and its numerous museums, monuments and the national zoo and the National Museum of Anthropology (which houses the Aztec Calendar Stone).

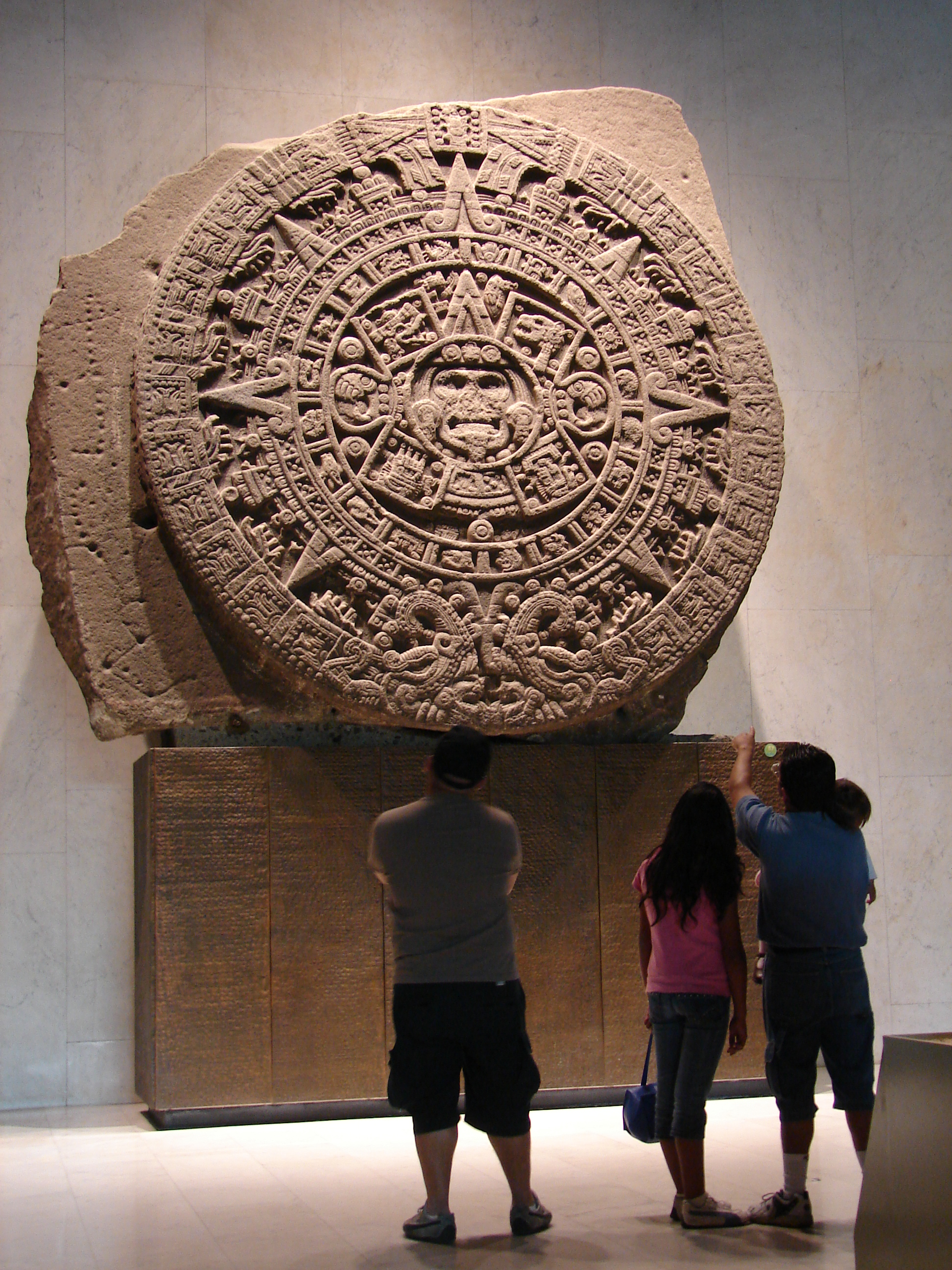
The Aztec sun stone in the National Museum of Anthropology

Another piece of architecture is the Palacio de Bellas Artes, a white marble theater/museum whose weight is such that it has gradually been sinking into the soft ground below. Its construction began during the presidency of Porfirio Díaz and ended in 1934, after being interrupted by the Mexican Revolution in the 1920s.

The Plaza de las Tres Culturas, in this square are located the College of Santa Cruz de Tlatelolco, that is the first and oldest European school of higher learning in the Americas, and the archeological site of the city-state of Tlatelolco, and the shrine and Basilica of Our Lady of Guadalupe are also important sites. There is a double-decker bus, known as the "Turibus", that circles most of these sites, and has timed audio describing the sites in multiple languages as they are passed.

In addition, according to the Secretariat of Tourism, the city has about 170 museums—among the top ten cities in the world with the highest number of museums—over 100 art galleries, and some 30 concert halls, all of which maintain a constant cultural activity during the whole year. Many areas (e.g. Palacio Nacional and the National Institute of Cardiology) have murals painted by Diego Rivera. He and his wife Frida Kahlo lived in Coyoacán, where several of their homes, studios, and art collections are open to the public. The house where Leon Trotsky was initially granted asylum and finally murdered in 1940 is also in Coyoacán. In addition, there are several haciendas that are now restaurants, such as the San Ángel Inn, the Hacienda de Tlalpan, Hacienda de Cortés and the Hacienda de los Morales.

== Transportation ==
=== Airports ===
Mexico City International Airport (MEX)

Since 2022, Mexico City is served by three airports: Mexico City International Airport (MEX), Felipe Ángeles International Airport (NLU), and Toluca International Airport (TLC).

Mexico City International Airport (IATA Airport Code: MEX), also known as Benito Juárez International Airport or AICM, is Mexico City's main airport and is located within the city limits in the Venustiano Carranza borough. It serves as the primary hub of Aeroméxico (SkyTeam), the country's flag carrier. It is also a major operating base for low-cost airlines Volaris and Viva. With over 44,605,800 passengers in 2025, the airport handles the majority of domestic and international flights for Mexico City and is ranked as the busiest airport in the country, the third-busiest in Latin America, and the 15th-busiest in North America. The airport is directly served by Line 5 of the Mexico City Metro at the Terminal Aérea station.

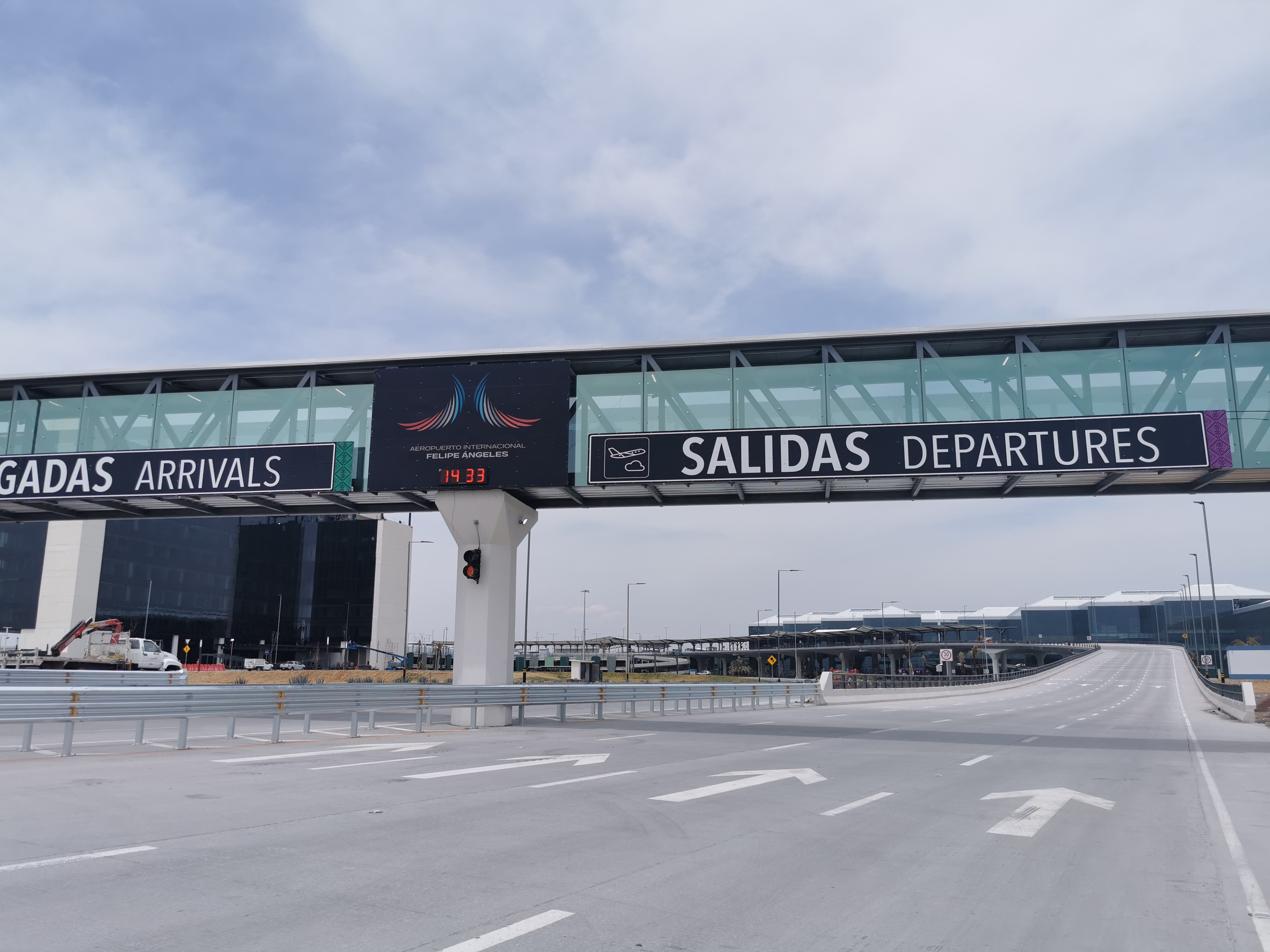
Felipe Ángeles International Airport (NLU)

Felipe Ángeles International Airport (IATA Airport Code: NLU), more commonly known as AIFA, is Mexico City's secondary airport and was opened in 2022. It is located in Zumpango, State of Mexico, 48.8 kilometres (30 mi) north-northeast of the historic center of Mexico City by car.It serves as the hub for the state-owned airline Mexicana de Aviación. It is also a major operating base for low-cost airline Viva. The airport handles all air cargo traffic for Mexico City since 2023 as a result of all cargo operations ceasing at AICM. The airport has a direct rail connection to Mexico City proper via the Felipe Ángeles, one of Mexico City's Tren Interurbano services, with trains connecting to Buenavista station.

Toluca International Airport (IATA Airport Code: TLC), also known as Adolfo López Mateos International Airport, also serves the Greater Mexico City area. It is located in Toluca, State of Mexico, 59 kilometres (36 mi) west of Mexico City proper and 43 kilometres (26 mi) from the Santa Fe business district. It has a few flights offered by low-cost airlines Volaris and Viva. The closest rail station that provides a connection to Mexico City is the Metepec station on the El Insurgente route, one of Mexico City's Tren Interurbano services, with trains connecting to Observatorio station.

=== Sistema de Movilidad Integrada ===
In 2019, the graphic designer Lance Wyman was engaged to create an integrated map of the multimodal public transportation system; he presented a new logo for the Sistema de Movilidad Integrada, describing eight distinct modes of transportation. The head of the government, Claudia Sheinbaum, said the branding would be used for a new single payment card to streamline public transportation fare collection.

=== Rail ===
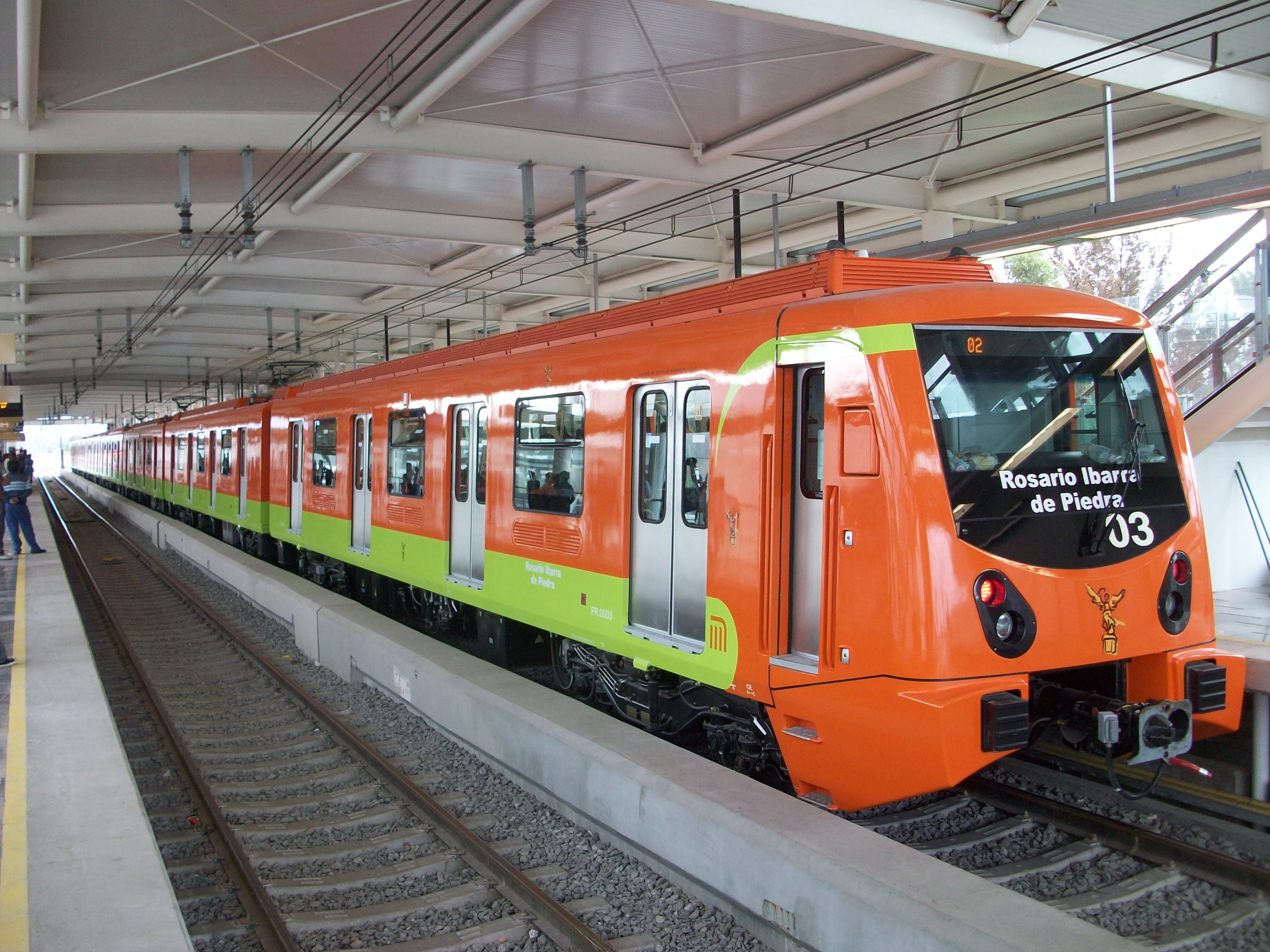
Mexico City Metro

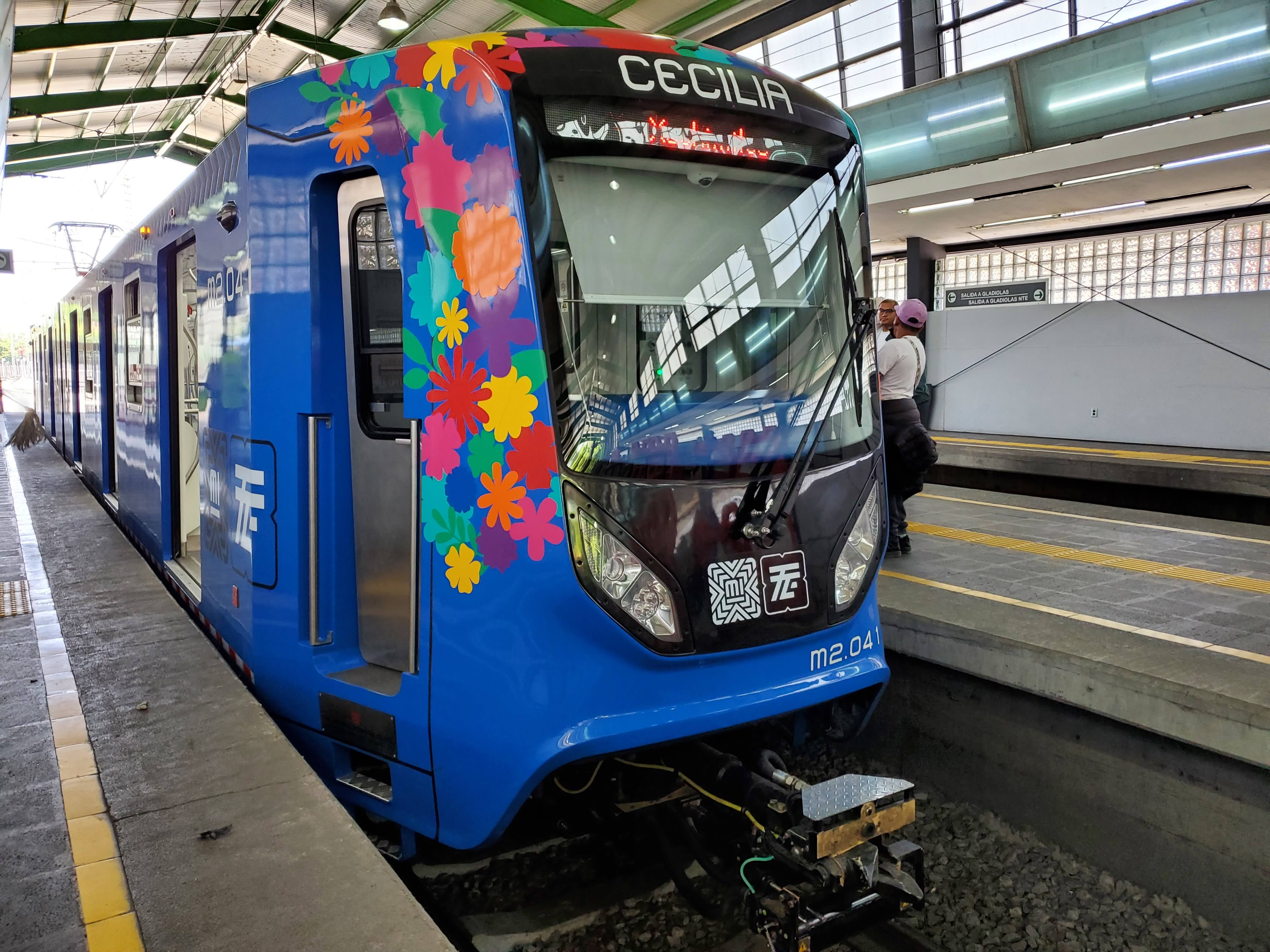
Tren Ligero

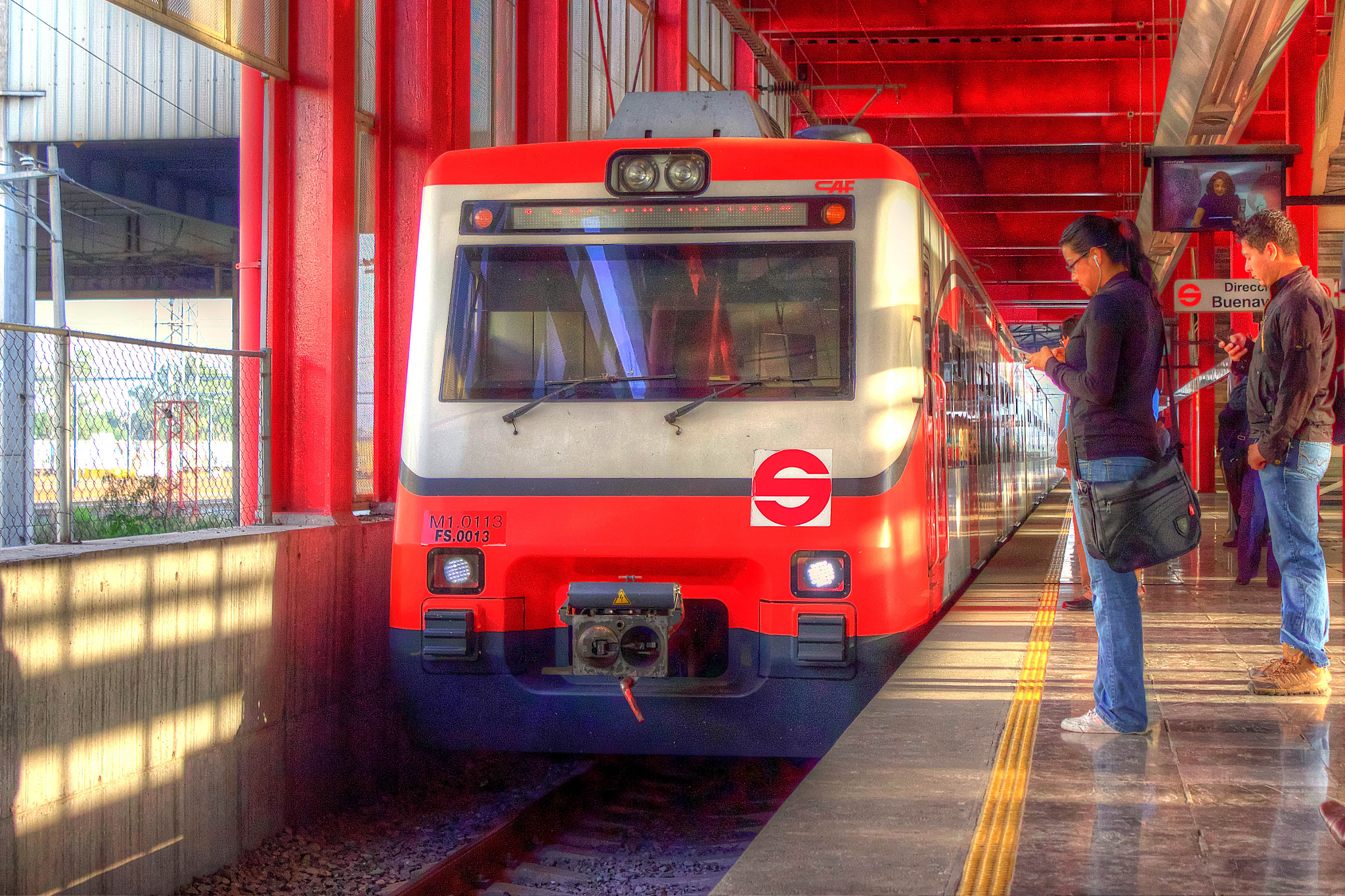
Tren Suburbano

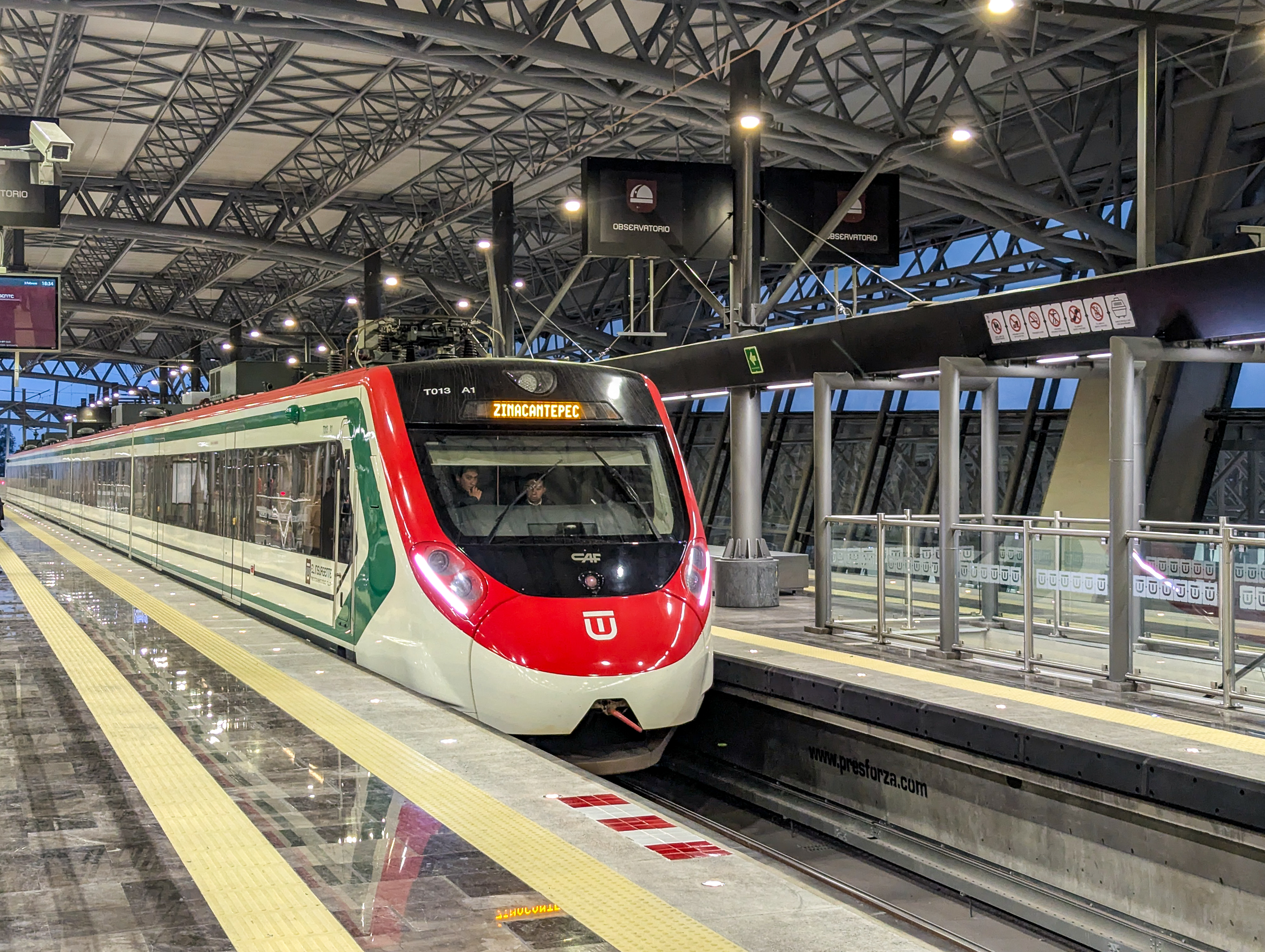
Tren Interurbano

==== Metro ====
Mexico City is served by the Mexico City Metro, a 225.9 km (140 mi) metro system, which is the second-largest metro system in North America and the largest in Latin America. The first portions were opened in 1969 and it has expanded to 12 lines with 195 stations, transporting 4.4 million people every day.

==== Tren Ligero ====
The Tren Ligero (English: Light Rail) network consists of just one line, the Mexico City Light Rail. Service originates at the Tasqueña station in the Coyoacán borough, where it connects with Line 2 of the Mexico City Metro, and travels through the boroughs of Tlalpan and Xochimilco.

==== Tren Suburbano ====
The Tren Suburbano serves as the main commuter rail system serving the Greater Mexico City area. It is currently made up of just one line, Line 1. Trains originate from the Buenavista railway station in the Cuauhtemóc borough and travel to the municipalities of Tlalnepantla, Tultitlán, and Cuautitlán Izcalli in the State of Mexico.

==== Tren Interurbano ====
Since 2026, Mexico City is served by additional commuter rail trains under the umbrella term Tren Interurbano. These trains are operated by the Agencia de Trenes y Transporte Público Integrado (ATTRAPI). El Insurgente originates from Observatorio railway station in the Álvaro Obregón borough and travels west to Toluca in the State of Mexico. The Felipe Ángeles originates from the Buenavista railway station and provides a direct rail connection to Felipe Ángeles International Airport.

A third Tren Interurbano service is currently under construction and will connect Mexico City with Pachuca in the State of Hidalgo. This service will originate from the Buenavista railway station and is expected to begin operations in 2027.

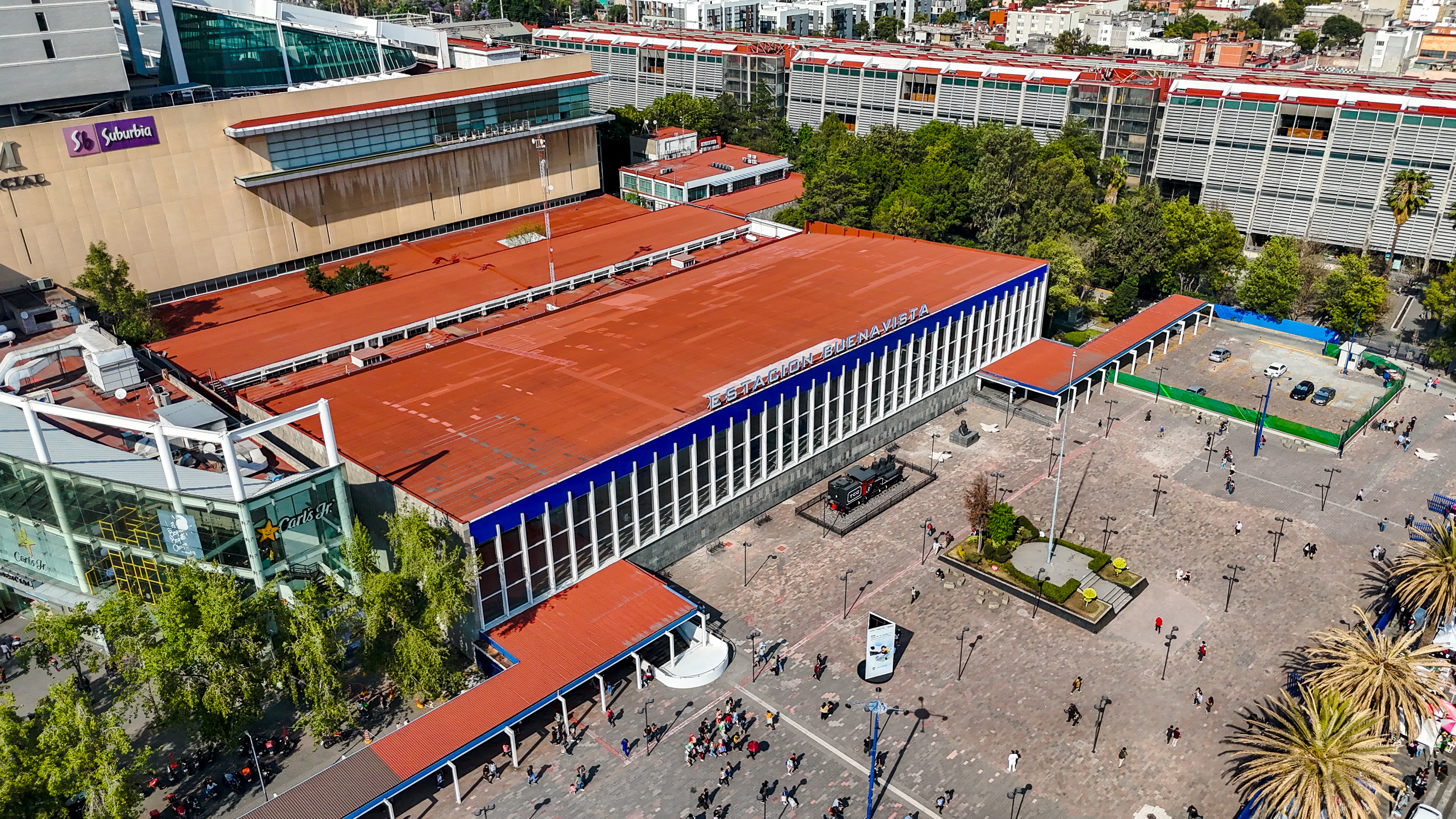
Buenavista railway station

==== National Passenger Trains ====
Until 1997, Buenavista railway station was the hub of many long-distance passenger trains operated by the now-defunct Ferrocarriles Nacionales de México (N de M), which connected Mexico City with other major cities throughout the country.

In 2025, construction commenced on the proposed Tren Ciudad de México–Querétaro, which will be a passenger rail service operating out of Buenavista railway station and connecting to Santiago de Querétaro. Service is expected to begin in late 2027. Like the Tren Interurbano services, this new service will be operated by the Agencia de Trenes y Transporte Público Integrado (ATTRAPI). That same year, construction commenced on a segment between Querétaro and Irapuato, Guanajuato that is expected to be a component of the larger proposed Tren Ciudad de México–Guadalajara.

=== Bus ===
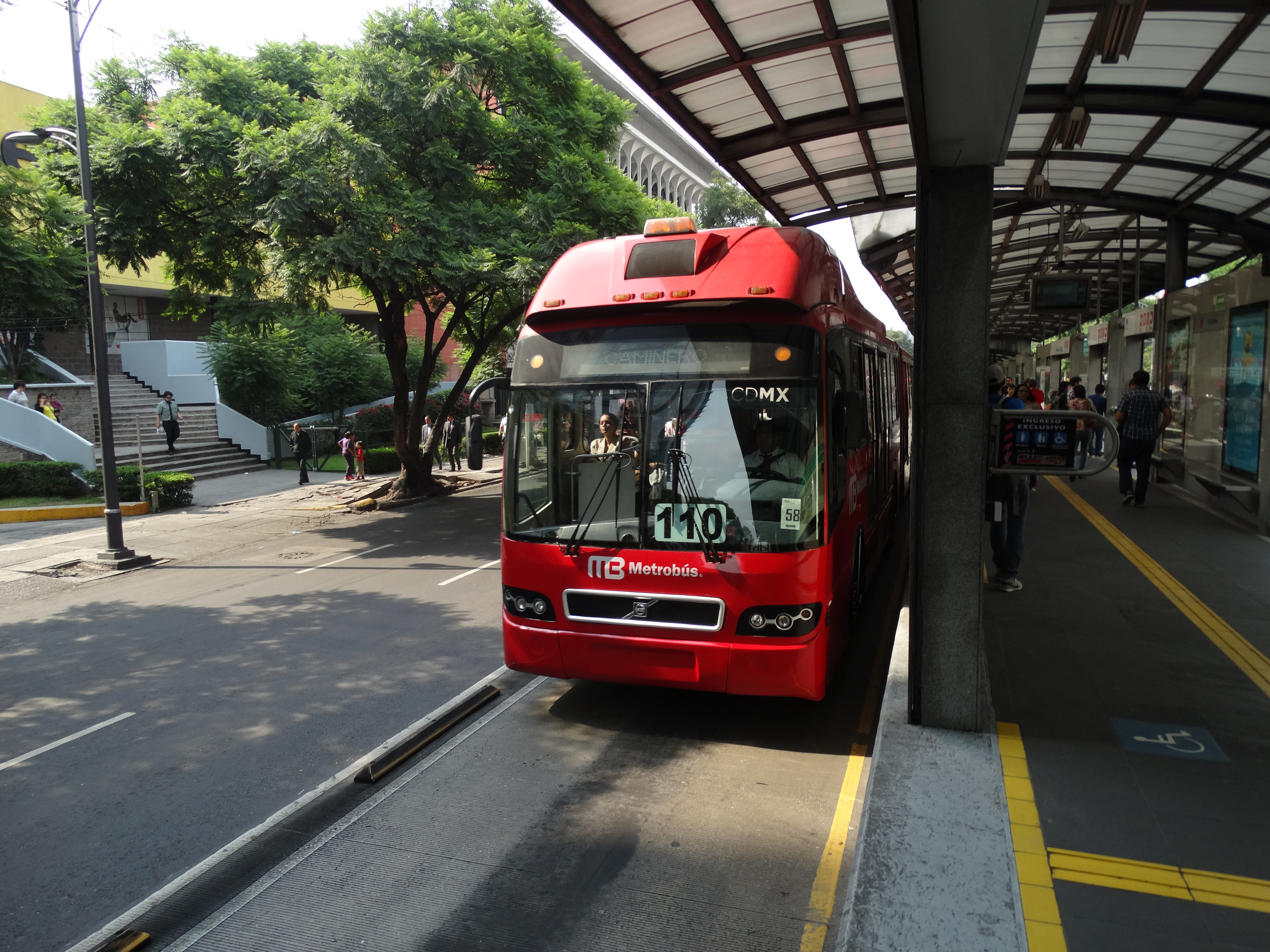
Metrobús

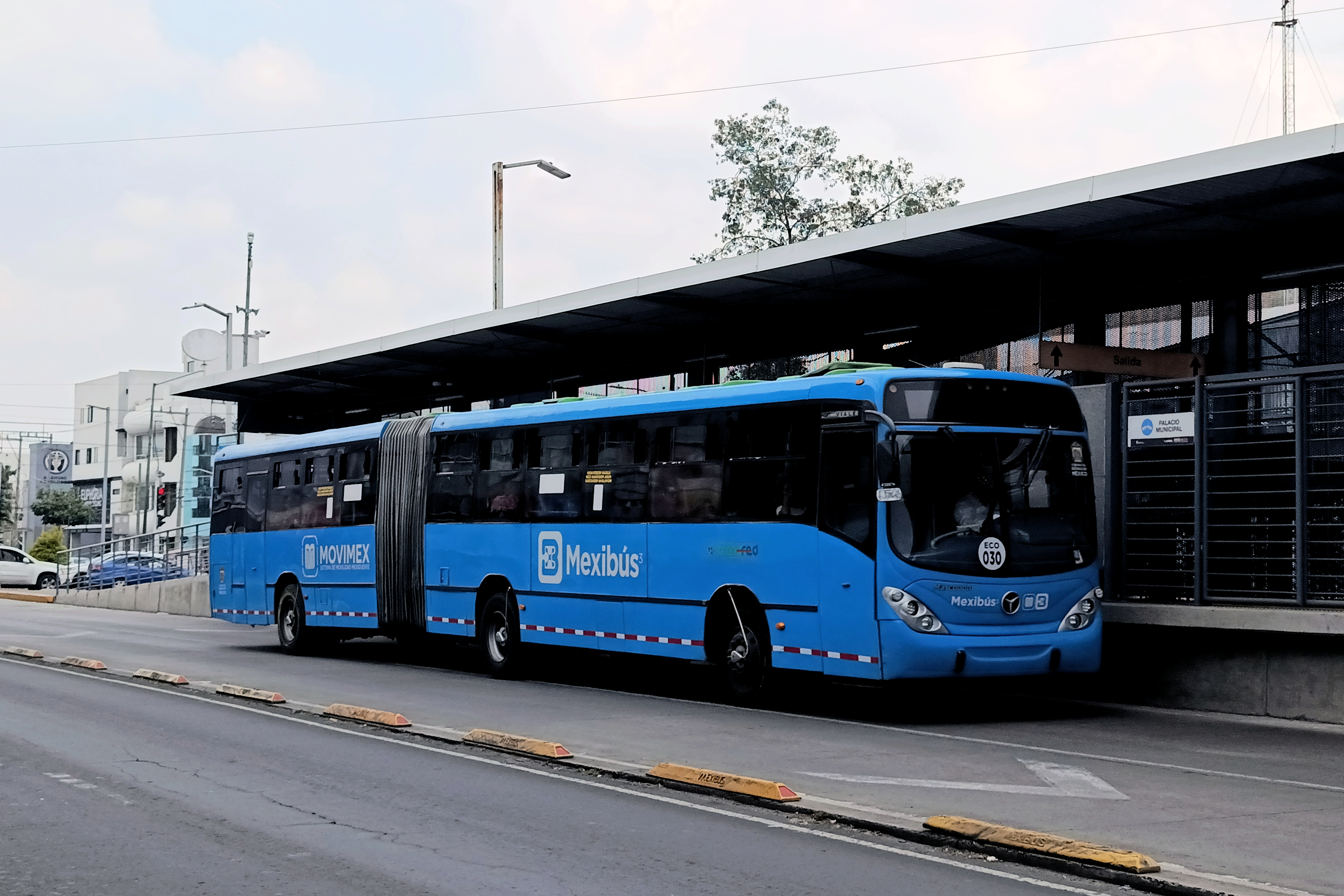
Mexibús

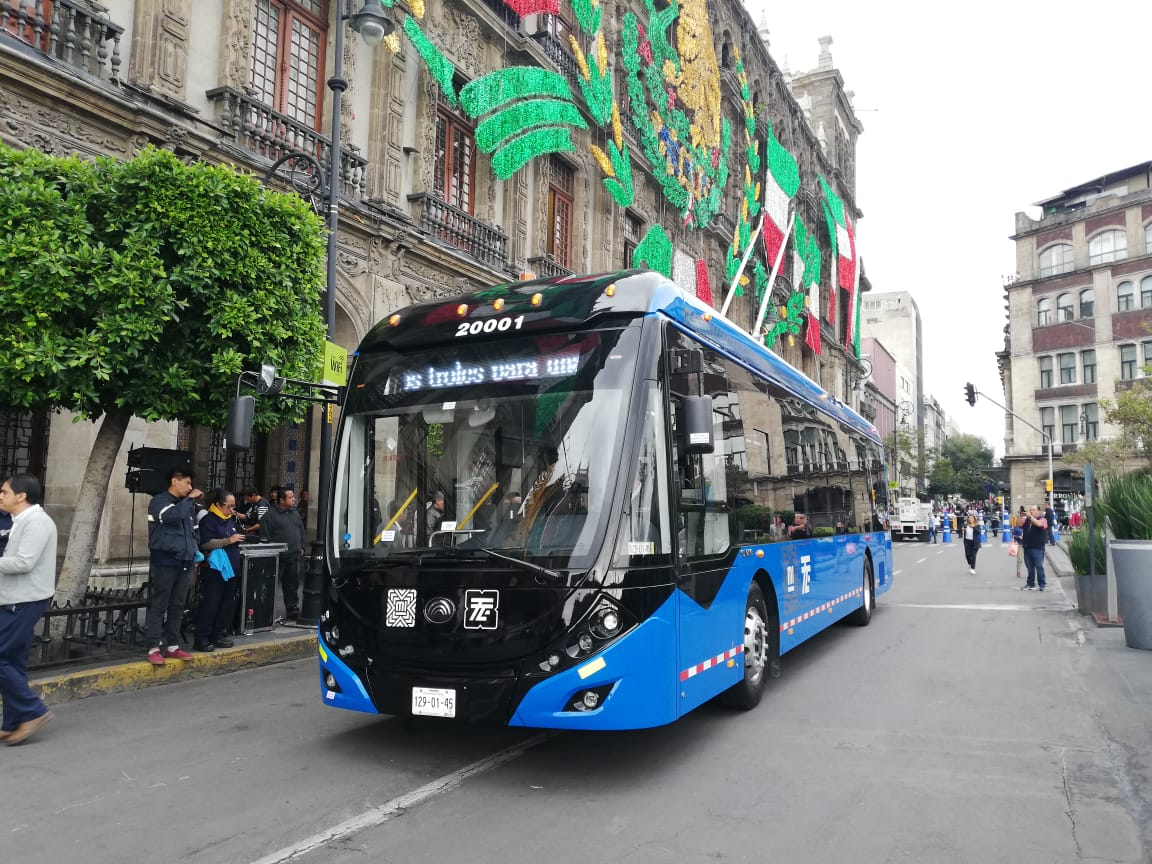
Trolebús

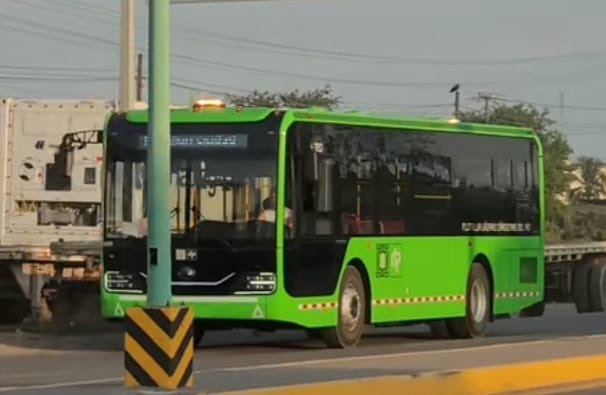
RTP

Mexico City has an extensive bus network, consisting of the Metrobús, Mexibús, Trolebús, Red de Transporte de Pasajeros (RTP), and Pesero.

==== Metrobús ====
The Metrobús is the primary bus rapid transit network in the city. Line 1 opened in 2005 and since then has expanded to seven different routes. Routes run along many major streets in the city such as Paseo de la Reforma and Avenida de los Insurgentes.

==== Mexibús ====
The Mexibús is the other bus rapid transit network that serves the city, but it primarily operates in adjoining municipalities in the State of Mexico. Service launched in 2010 and consists of four routes. These routes have connections to the Mexico City Metro at the Cuidad Azteca, Pantitlán, and La Raza stations.

==== Trolleybus ====
The Mexico City Trolleybus network consists of eight lines.

==== Red de Transporte de Pasajeros ====
Most other urban bus routes in the city operate as part of the Red de Transporte de Pasajeros (RTP).

==== Pesero ====
The Pesero (also known as the microbus) is a privately operated and high frequency bus service which covers various routes and neighbourhoods across the city. It is an affordable and convenient way to travel and is often rich with culture such as musicians and other performers who sometimes busk on them.

==== Inter-city bus ====
Terminal Central de Autobuses del Norte

Mexico City is served by multiple inter-city bus stations and acts a major hub for inter-city bus travel in the country. These bus terminals have direct connections to the Mexico City Metro.

- Terminal Central de Autobuses del Norte
- Terminal Central de Autobuses del Sur (Tasqueña)
- Terminal de Autobuses de Pasajeros de Oriente (TAPO)
- Terminal Central del Poniente (Observatorio)

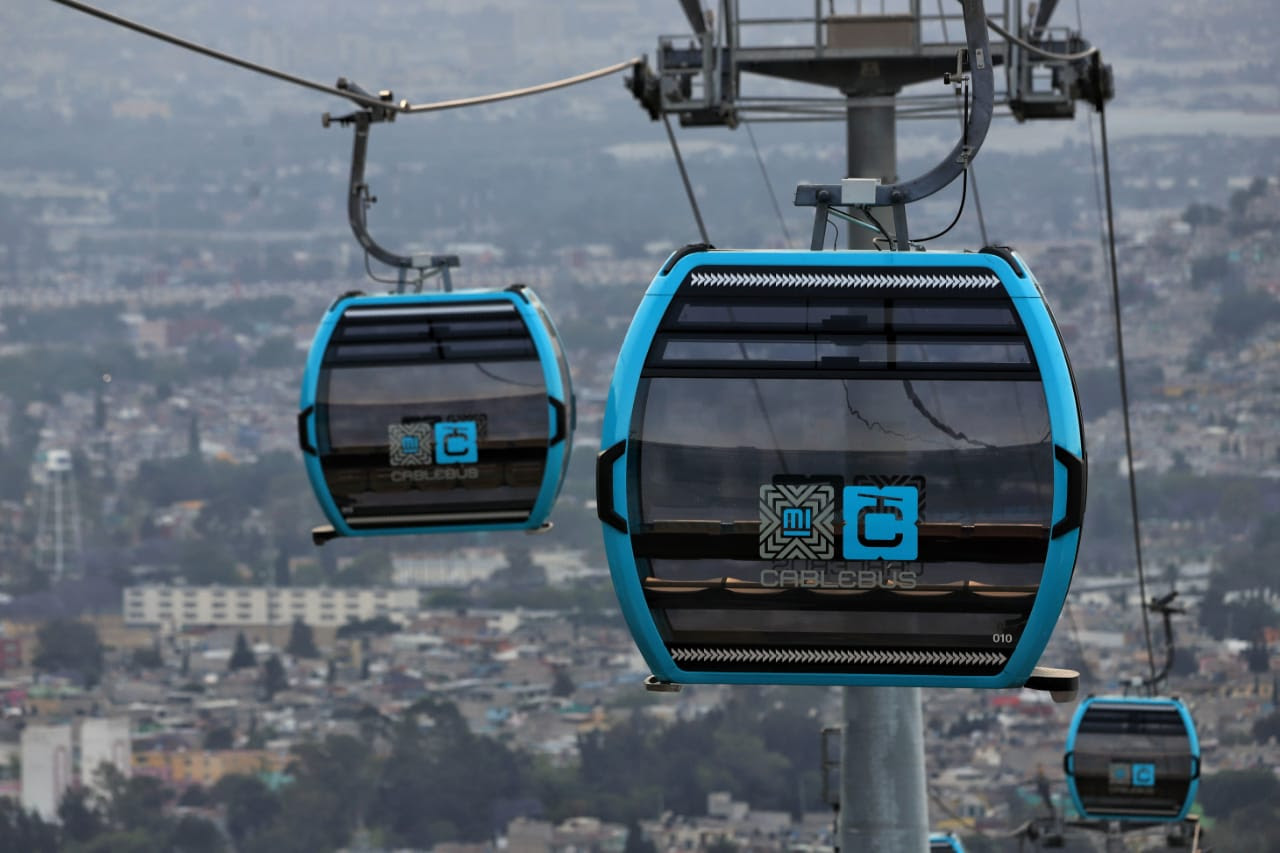
Cablebús

=== Cablebús ===
Since 2021, Mexico City is served by a network of cable cars, known as the Cablebús, that serve the more mountainous and high elevation areas of the city. The network consists of three lines, with three additional lines being planned.

=== Roads ===
Mexico City has a large road network, and relatively high private car usage, estimated at more than 4.5 million in 2016. There is an environmental program, called Hoy No Circula ("Today Does Not Run", or "One Day without a Car"), whereby vehicles that have not passed emissions testing are restricted from circulating on certain days according to the ending digit of their license plates, in an attempt to cut down on pollution and traffic congestion.

Some of the city's prominent streets, thoroughfares and highways include Paseo de la Reforma, Avenida de los Insurgentes, Avenida Bucareli, Avenida Juárez, Calle Madero (pedestrian street), Circuito Interior Bicentenario, Circuito Exterior Mexiquenese, and Viaducto Miguel Alemán.

The Anillo Periférico is one of the more notable roads in the city as a second story (el segundo piso) was constructed in 2006 as a method to reduce traffic congestion.

=== Cycling ===
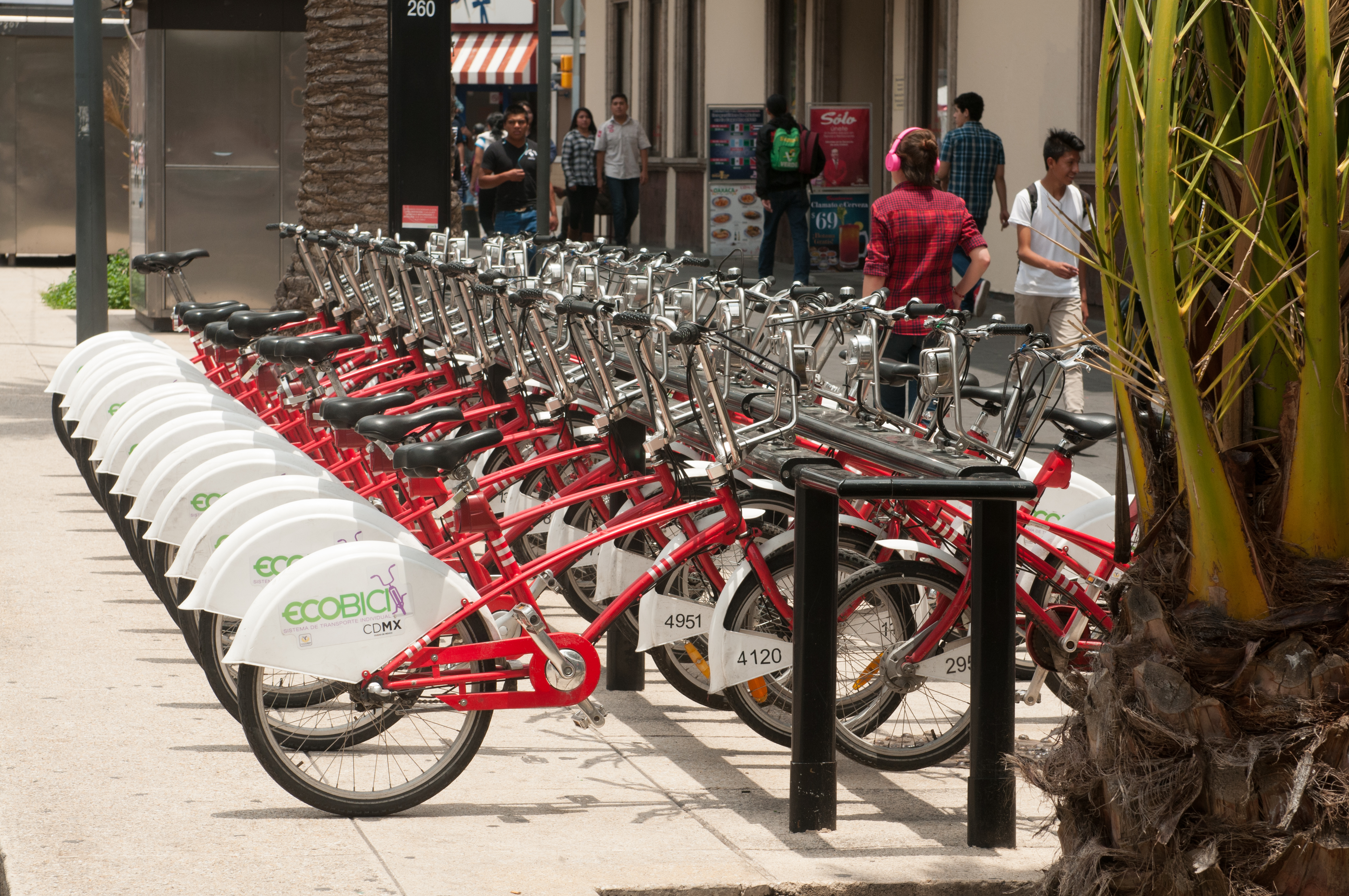
Bicycles available for rental in Zona Rosa

The Mexico City local government oversees the administration of Ecobici, North America's second-largest bicycle sharing system. Established to promote sustainable urban transportation, Ecobici facilitates convenient access to bicycles for residents and visitors alike. As of September 2013, the system comprised 276 stations strategically positioned across an expansive area extending from the Historic center to Polanco, a prominent district in the city. Within this network, approximately 4,000 bicycles are available for public use, enabling individuals to navigate the metropolitan landscape efficiently and reduce reliance on traditional motorized modes of transportation.

== Culture ==
=== Art ===
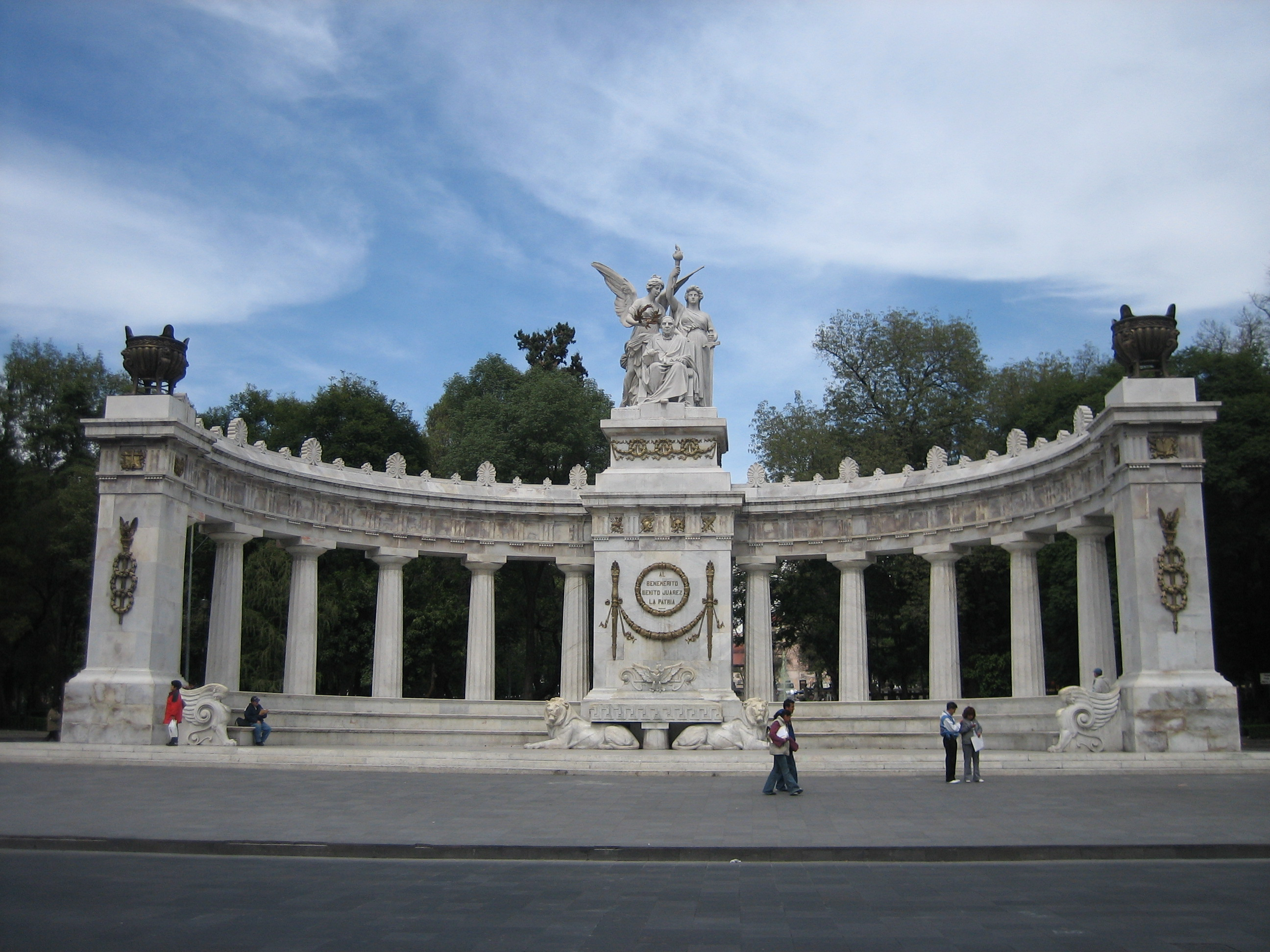
The monument "To the Meritorious Benito Juárez", Mexico City

Secular works of art of this period include the equestrian sculpture of Charles IV of Spain, locally known as El Caballito ("The little horse"). This piece, in bronze, was the work of Manuel Tolsá and it has been placed at the Plaza Tolsá, in front of the Palacio de Mineria (Mining Palace). Directly in front of this building is the Museo Nacional de Arte (Munal) (the National Museum of Art).

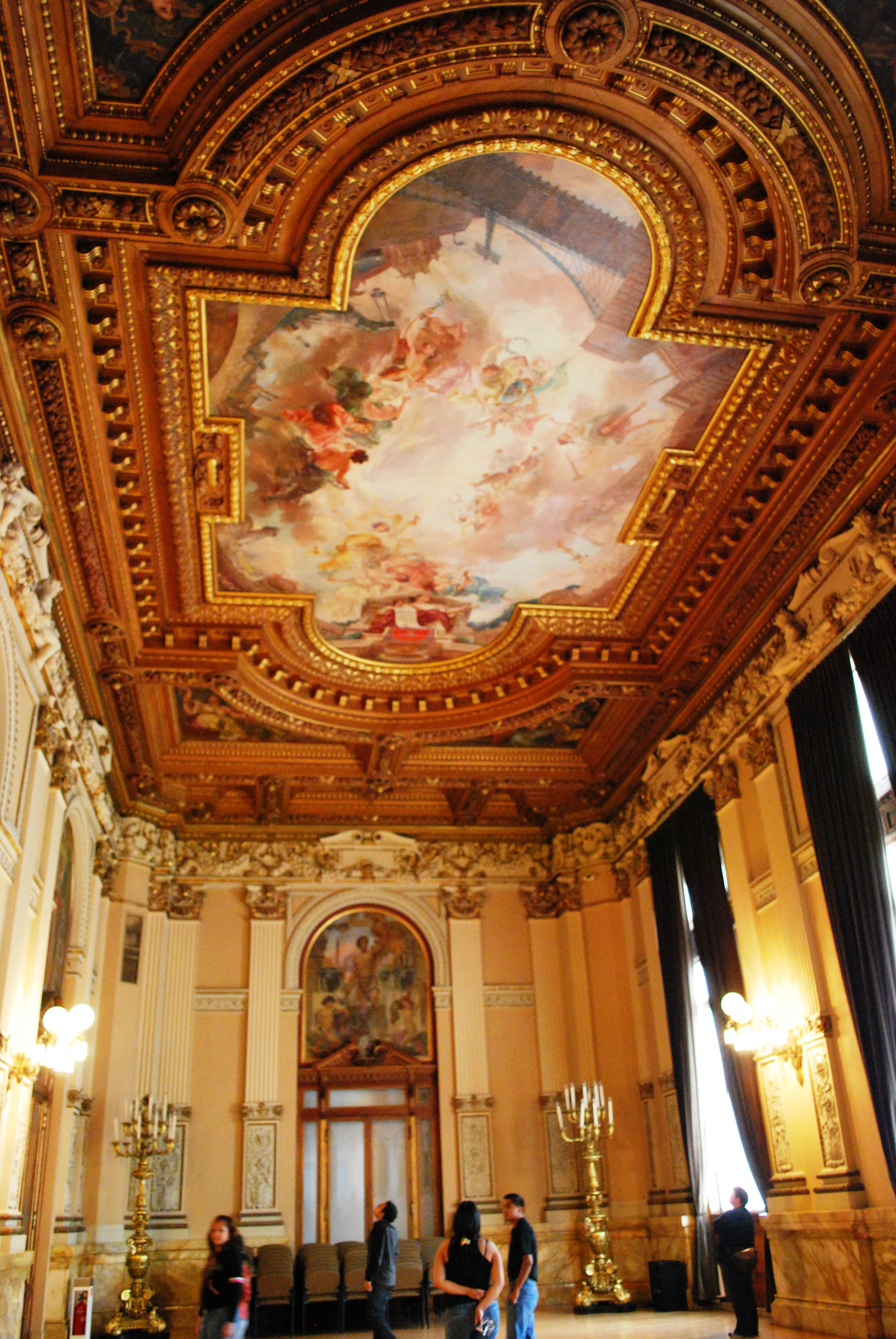
The Receptions Hall at the Museo Nacional de Arte

During the 19th century, an important producer of art was the Academia de San Carlos (San Carlos Art Academy), founded during colonial times, and which later became the Escuela Nacional de Artes Plásticas (the National School of Arts) including painting, sculpture and graphic design, one of UNAM's art schools. Many of the works produced by the students and faculty of that time are now displayed in the Museo Nacional de San Carlos (National Museum of San Carlos).

One of the students, José María Velasco, is considered one of the greatest Mexican landscape painters of the 19th century. Porfirio Díaz's regime sponsored arts, especially those that followed the French school. Popular arts in the form of cartoons and illustrations flourished, e.g. those of José Guadalupe Posada and Manuel Manilla. The permanent collection of the San Carlos Museum also includes paintings by European masters such as Rembrandt, Velázquez, Murillo, and Rubens.

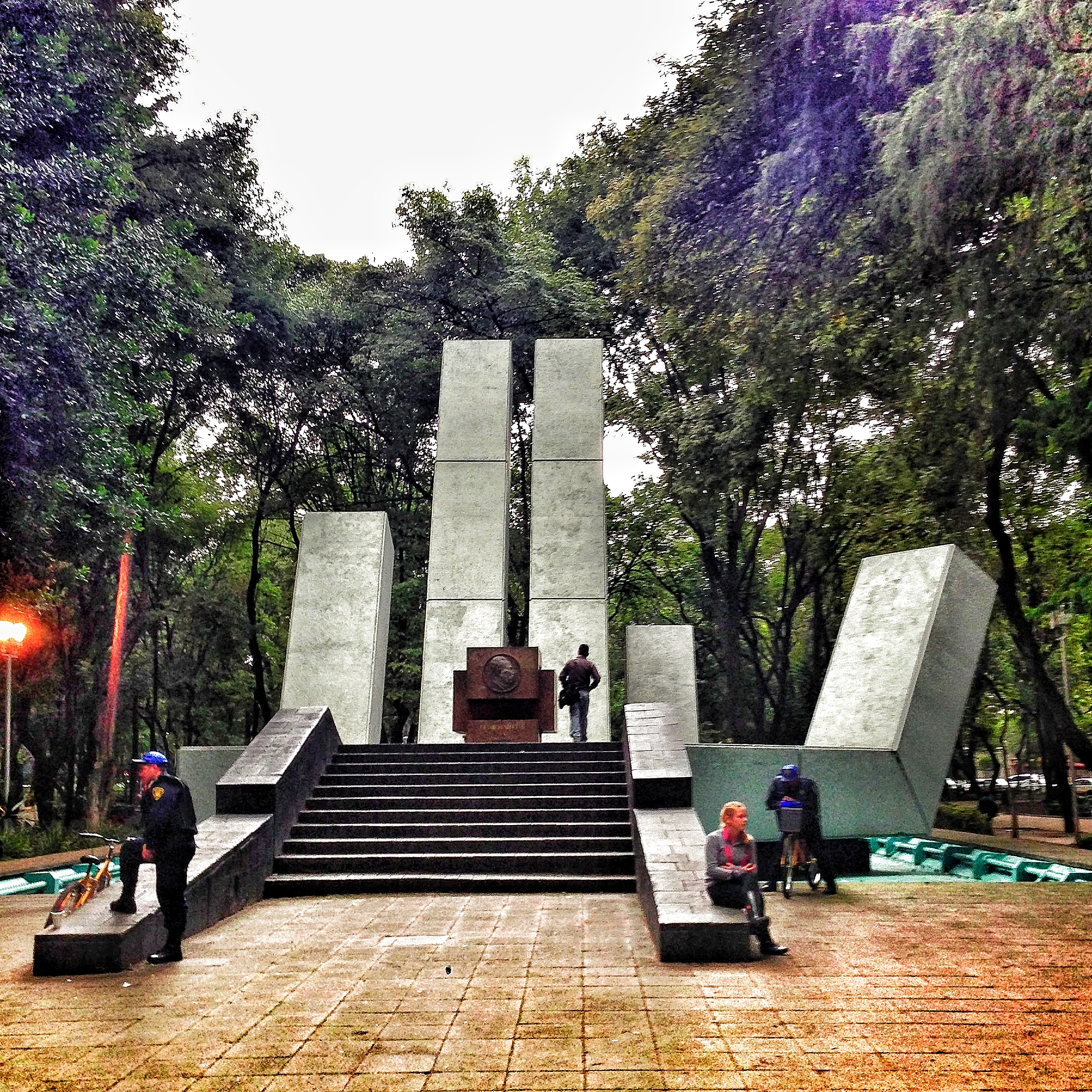
The monument to Lázaro Cárdenas (outstretched hand welcoming Spanish immigrants), Parque España

After the Mexican Revolution, an avant-garde artistic movement originated in Mexico City: muralism. Many of the works of muralists José Clemente Orozco, David Alfaro Siqueiros and Diego Rivera are displayed in numerous buildings in the city, most notably at the National Palace and the Palacio de Bellas Artes. Frida Kahlo, wife of Rivera, with a strong nationalist expression, was also one of the most renowned of Mexican painters. Her house has become a museum that displays many of her works.

The former home of Rivera muse Dolores Olmedo houses the namesake museum. The facility is in Xochimilco borough in southern Mexico City and includes several buildings surrounded by sprawling manicured lawns. It houses a large collection of Rivera and Kahlo paintings and drawings, as well as living Xoloizcuintles (Mexican Hairless Dog). It also regularly hosts small but important temporary exhibits of classical and modern art (e.g. Venetian Masters and Contemporary New York artists).

In the 20th century, many artists immigrated to Mexico City from different regions of Mexico, such as Leopoldo Méndez, an engraver from Veracruz, who supported the creation of the socialist Taller de la Gráfica Popular (Popular Graphics Workshop), designed to help blue-collar workers find a venue to express their art. Other painters came from abroad, such as Catalan painter Remedios Varo and other Spanish and Jewish exiles. It was in the second half of the 20th century that the artistic movement began to drift apart from the Revolutionary theme. José Luis Cuevas opted for a modernist style in contrast to the muralist movement associated with social politics.

=== Museums ===
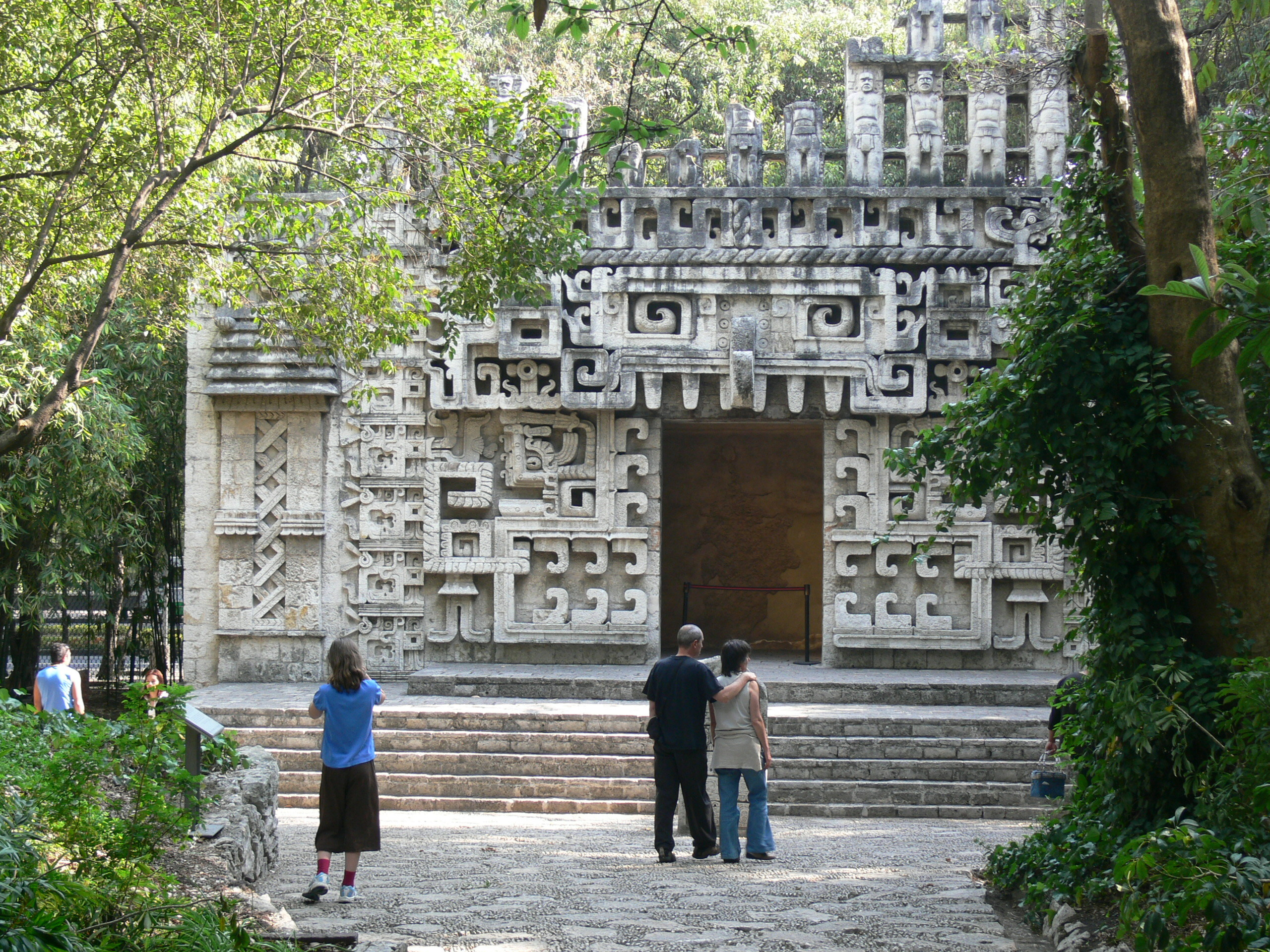
A reconstruction of the entrance to the Hochob temple in the National Museum of Anthropology

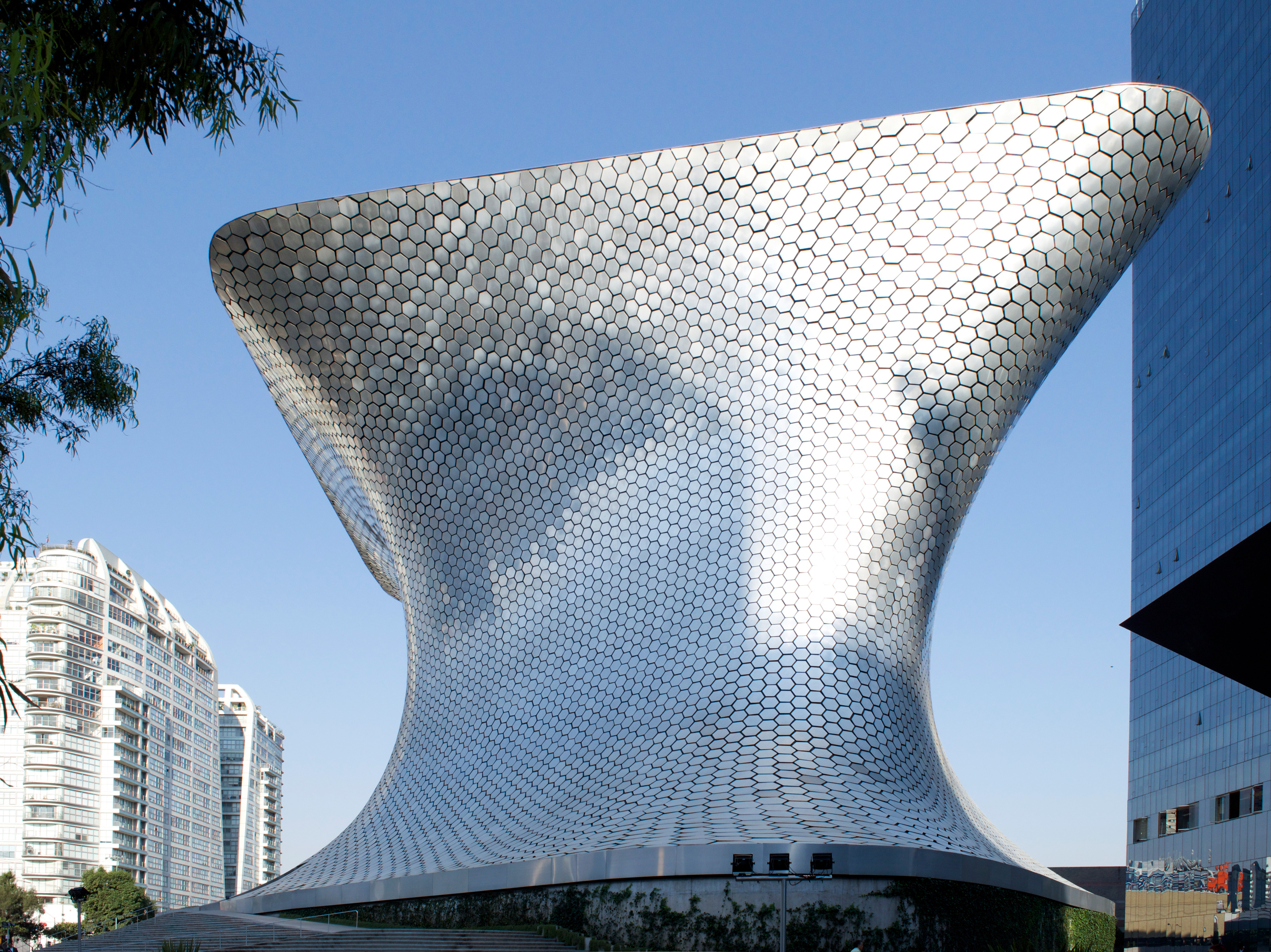
The Museo Soumaya

Mexico City has numerous museums dedicated to art, including Mexican colonial, modern and contemporary art, and international art. The Museo Tamayo was opened in the mid-1980s to house the collection of international contemporary art donated by Mexican painter Rufino Tamayo. The collection includes pieces by Picasso, Klee, Kandinsky, Warhol and many others, though most of the collection is stored while visiting exhibits are shown. The Museo de Arte Moderno is a repository of Mexican artists from the 20th century, including Rivera, Orozco, Siqueiros, Kahlo, Gerzso, Carrington, Tamayo, and regularly hosts temporary exhibits of international modern art. In southern Mexico City, the Carrillo Gil Museum showcases avant-garde artists, as does the Museo Universitario Arte Contemporáneo, designed by Mexican architect Teodoro González de León, inaugurated in late 2008.

The Museo Soumaya, named after the wife of Mexican magnate Carlos Slim, has the largest private collection of original Rodin sculptures outside of France. It also has a large collection of Dalí sculptures, and recently began showing pieces in its masters collection including El Greco, Velázquez, Picasso and Canaletto. The museum inaugurated a new futuristic-design facility in 2011 just north of Polanco, while maintaining a smaller facility in Plaza Loreto in southern Mexico City.

The Colección Júmex is a contemporary art museum located on the sprawling grounds of the Jumex juice company in the northern industrial suburb of Ecatepec. It has the largest private contemporary art collection in Latin America and hosts pieces from its permanent collection as well as traveling exhibits. The Museo de San Ildefonso, housed in the Antiguo Colegio de San Ildefonso in Mexico City's historic downtown district is a 17th-century colonnaded palace housing an art museum that regularly hosts world-class exhibits of Mexican and international art. The Museo Nacional de Arte is also located in a former palace in the historic center. It houses a large collection of pieces by all major Mexican artists of the last 400 years and also hosts visiting exhibits.

Jack Kerouac, the noted American author, spent extended periods of time in the city, and wrote his 1959 masterpiece volume of poetry Mexico City Blues here. Another American author, William S. Burroughs, also lived in Colonia Roma where he accidentally shot his wife. Most of Mexico City's museums can be visited from Tuesday to Sunday from 10am to 5pm, although some of them have extended schedules, such as the Museum of Anthropology and History, which is open to 7pm. In addition to this, entrance to most museums are free on Sunday. In some cases a modest fee may be charged.

The Memory and Tolerance Museum, inaugurated in 2011, showcases historical events of discrimination and genocide. Permanent exhibits include those on the Holocaust and other large-scale atrocities. It also houses temporary exhibits; one on Tibet was inaugurated by the Dalai Lama in September 2011.

=== Music, theater and entertainment ===
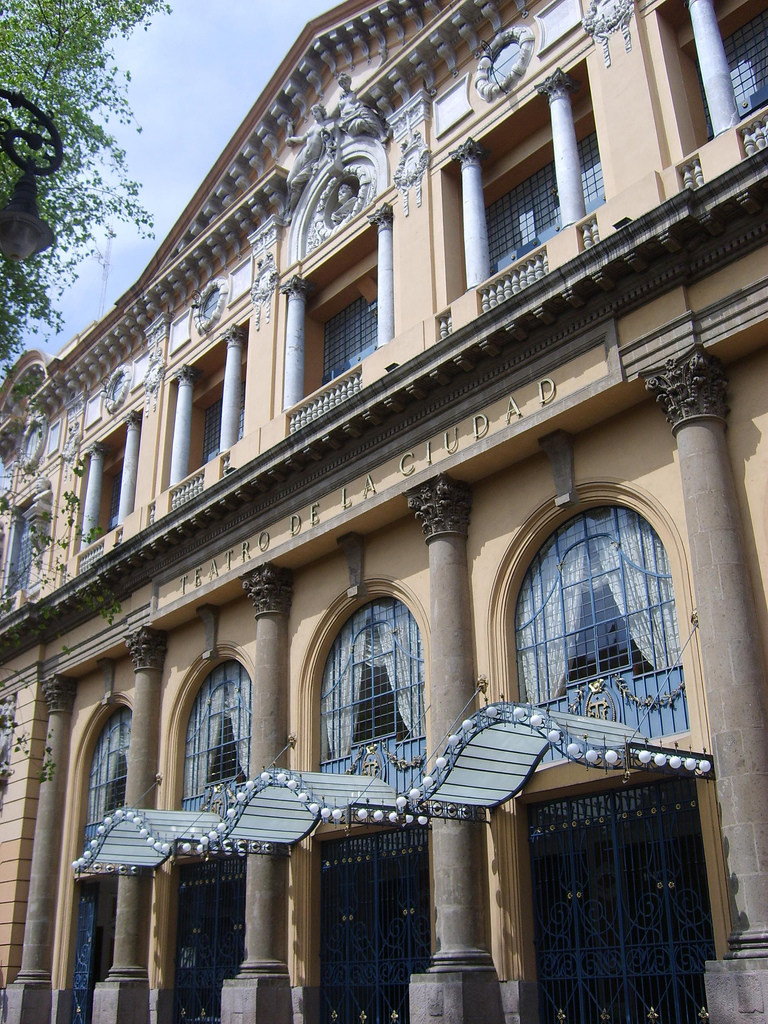
The City Theatre, built in 1918

Mexico City is home to a number of orchestras offering season programs. These include the Mexico City Philharmonic, which performs at the Sala Ollin Yoliztli; the National Symphony Orchestra, whose home base is the Palacio de Bellas Artes (Palace of the Fine Arts), a masterpiece of art nouveau and art decó styles; the Philharmonic Orchestra of the National Autonomous University of Mexico (OFUNAM), and the Minería Symphony Orchestra, both of which perform at the Sala Nezahualcóyotl, which was the first wrap-around concert hall in the Western Hemisphere when inaugurated in 1976. There are also many smaller ensembles that enrich the city's musical scene, including the Carlos Chávez Youth Symphony, the Cuarteto Latinoamericano, the New World Orchestra (Orquesta del Nuevo Mundo), the National Polytechnical Symphony and the Bellas Artes Chamber Orchestra (Orquesta de Cámara de Bellas Artes).

Mexico City is a leading center of popular culture and music. There are a multitude of venues hosting Spanish and foreign-language performers. These include the 10,000-seat National Auditorium that regularly schedules the Spanish and English-language pop and rock artists, as well as many of the world's leading performing arts ensembles, the auditorium also broadcasts grand opera performances from New York's Metropolitan Opera on giant, high definition screens. In 2007, the National Auditorium was selected world's best venue by multiple genre media.

Other sites for pop-artist performances include the 3,000-seat Teatro Metropolitan, the 15,000-seat Palacio de los Deportes, and the larger 50,000-seat Foro Sol Stadium, where popular international artists perform on a regular basis. The Cirque du Soleil has held several seasons at the Carpa Santa Fe, in the Santa Fe district in the western part of the city. There are numerous venues for smaller musical ensembles and solo performers. These include the Lunario, Circo Volador and Voilá Acoustique. Recent additions include the 20,000-seat Arena Ciudad de México, the 3,000-seat Pepsi Center World Trade Center, and the 2,500-seat Auditorio BB.

The Centro Nacional de las Artes (National Center for the Arts) has several venues for music, theater, dance. UNAM's main campus, also in the southern part of the city, is home to the Centro Cultural Universitario (the University Culture Center) (CCU). The CCU also houses the National Library, the interactive Universum, Museo de las Ciencias, the Sala Nezahualcóyotl concert hall, several theaters and cinemas, and the new University Museum of Contemporary Art (MUAC). A branch of the National University's CCU cultural center was inaugurated in 2007 in the facilities of the former Ministry of Foreign Affairs, known as Tlatelolco, in north-central Mexico City.

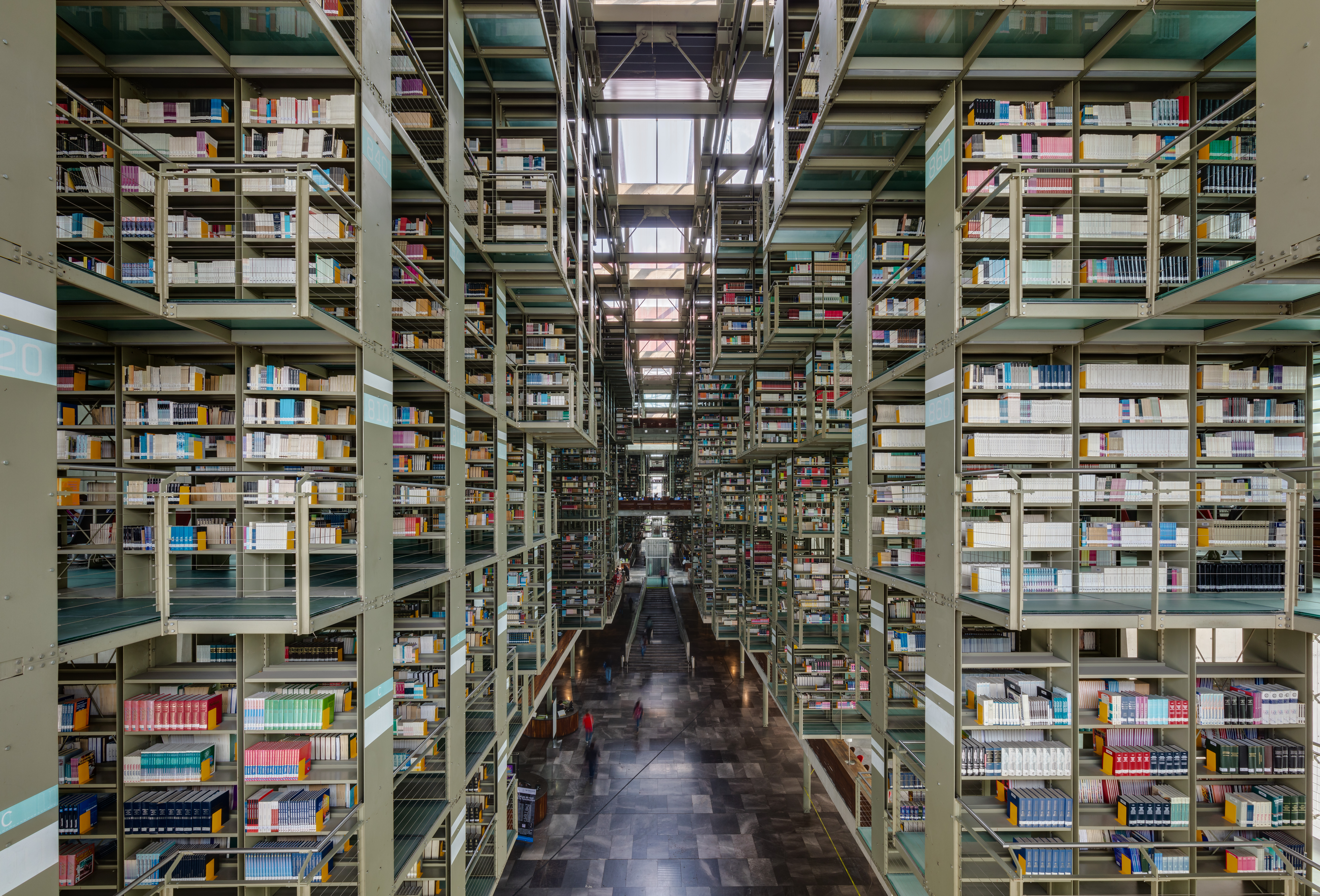
The Biblioteca Vasconcelos

The José Vasconcelos Library, a national library, is located on the grounds of the former Buenavista railroad station in the northern part of the city. The Papalote Museo del Niño (Kite Children's Museum), which houses the world's largest dome screen, is located in the wooded park of Chapultepec, near the Museo Tecnológico, and Aztlán Parque Urbano, an amusement park. The theme park Six Flags México (the largest amusement park in Latin America) is located in the Ajusco neighborhood, in the Tlalpan borough of southern Mexico City. During the winter, the main square of the Zócalo is transformed into a gigantic ice skating rink, which is said to be the largest in the world behind that of Moscow's Red Square.

The Cineteca Nacional (Mexican Film Library), near the Coyoacán suburb, shows a variety of films, and stages many film festivals, including the annual International Showcase, and many smaller ones ranging from Scandinavian and Uruguayan cinema, to Jewish and LGBT-themed films. Cinépolis and Cinemex, the two biggest film business chains, also have several film festivals throughout the year, with both national and international movies. Mexico City has a number of IMAX theaters, providing residents and visitors access to films ranging from documentaries to blockbusters on these large screens.

=== Cuisine ===
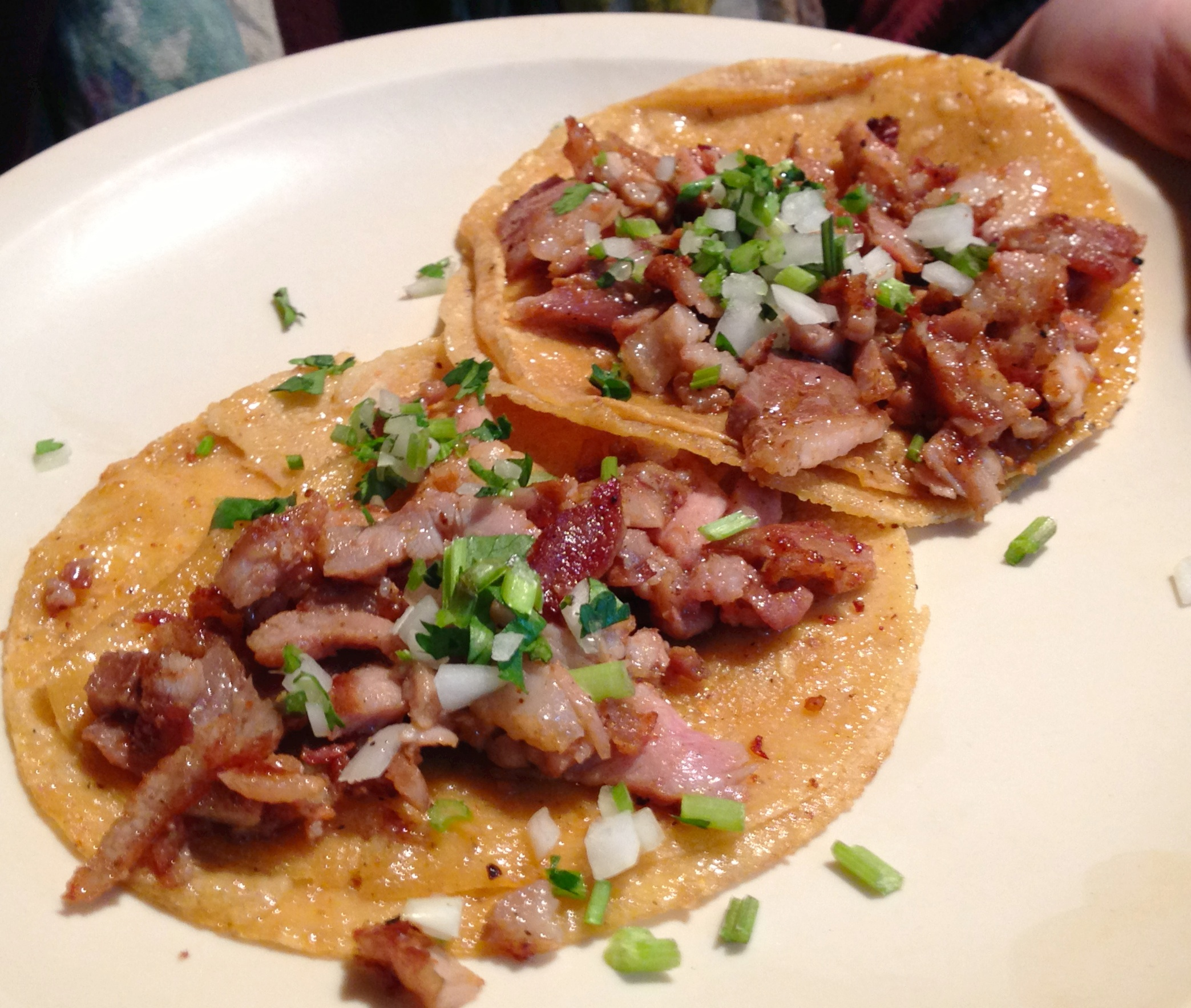
Street tacos in Mexico City

Once considered plebeian fare, by the 19th century tacos was a standard of Mexico City's cuisine. As authorities struggled to tax local taquerias, imposing licensing requirements and penalties, they recorded some details of the types of foods being served by these establishments. The most frequent reference was for tacos de barbacoa. Also mentioned were enchiladas, tacos de minero and gorditas, along with oyster shops and fried fish stands. There is evidence of some regional specialties being made available for recent migrants; at least two shops were known to serve pozole, a type of stew similar to hominy that is a staple of Guadalajara, Jalisco.

Mexico City is known for having some of the freshest fish and seafood in Mexico's interior. La Nueva Viga Market is the second largest seafood market in the world after the Tsukiji fish market in Japan.

Mexico City offers a variety of cuisines: restaurants specializing in the regional cuisines of Mexico's 31 states are available in the city, and the city also has several branches of internationally recognized restaurants. These include Paris' Au Pied de Cochon and Brasserie Lipp, Philippe (by Philippe Chow); Nobu, Quintonil, Morimoto; Pámpano, owned by Mexican-raised opera singer Plácido Domingo. There are branches of Japanese restaurant Suntory, Italian restaurant Alfredo, as well as New York steakhouses Morton's and The Palm, and Monte Carlo's BeefBar. Three of Lima's Haute restaurants, serving Peruvian cuisine, have locations in Mexico City: La Mar, Segundo Muelle and Astrid y Gastón.

For the 2023 list of World's 50 Best Restaurants as named by the British magazine Restaurant, Mexico City ranked 13th best with the Mexican avant-garde restaurant Pujol, owned by Mexican chef Enrique Olvera. Also notable is the Basque-Mexican fusion restaurant Biko, run and co-owned by Bruno Oteiza and Mikel Alonso, which placed outside the list at 59th, but in previous years has ranked within the top 50. Other that has been placed on the list in 2019 is the restaurant Sud 777 at 58th place. In 2024, seven restaurants in the city received Michelin stars. At the other end of the scale are working class pulque bars known as pulquerías, a challenge for tourists to locate and experience.

=== Media ===
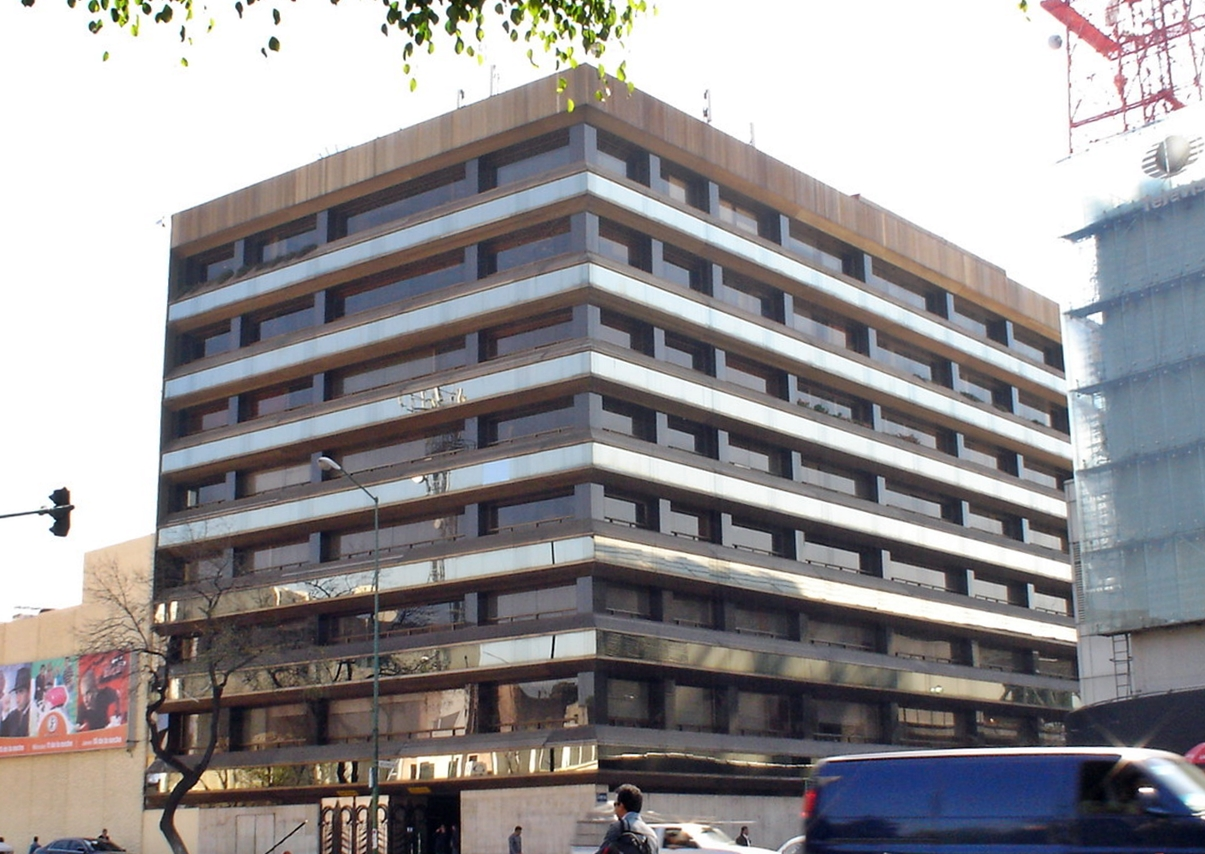
The Televisa headquarters in Mexico City

Mexico City is Mexico's most important hub for the printed media and book publishing industries. Dozens of daily newspapers are published, including El Universal, Excélsior, Reforma and La Jornada. Other major papers include Milenio, Crónica, El Economista and El Financiero. Leading magazines include Expansión, Proceso, Poder, as well as dozens of entertainment publications such as Vanidades, Quién, Chilango, TV Notas, and local editions of Vogue, GQ, and Architectural Digest.

It is also a leading center of the advertising industry. Most international ad firms have offices in the city, including Grey, JWT, Leo Burnett, Euro RSCG, BBDO, Ogilvy, Saatchi & Saatchi, and McCann Erickson. Many local firms also compete in the sector, including Alazraki, Olabuenaga/Chemistri, Terán, Augusto Elías, and Clemente Cámara, among others. There are 60 radio stations operating in the city and many local community radio transmission networks.

The two largest media companies in the Spanish-speaking world, Televisa and TV Azteca, are headquartered in Mexico City. Televisa often presents itself as the largest producer of Spanish-language content. Other local television channels include:

XHDF 1 (Azteca Uno), XEW 2 (Televisa W), XHCTMX 3, XHTV 4, XHGC 5, XHTDMX 6, XHIMT 7, XEQ 9, XEIPN 11, XHUNAM 20, XHCDM 21, XEIMT 22, XHTRES 28, XHTVM 40 and XHHCU 45.

=== Sports ===
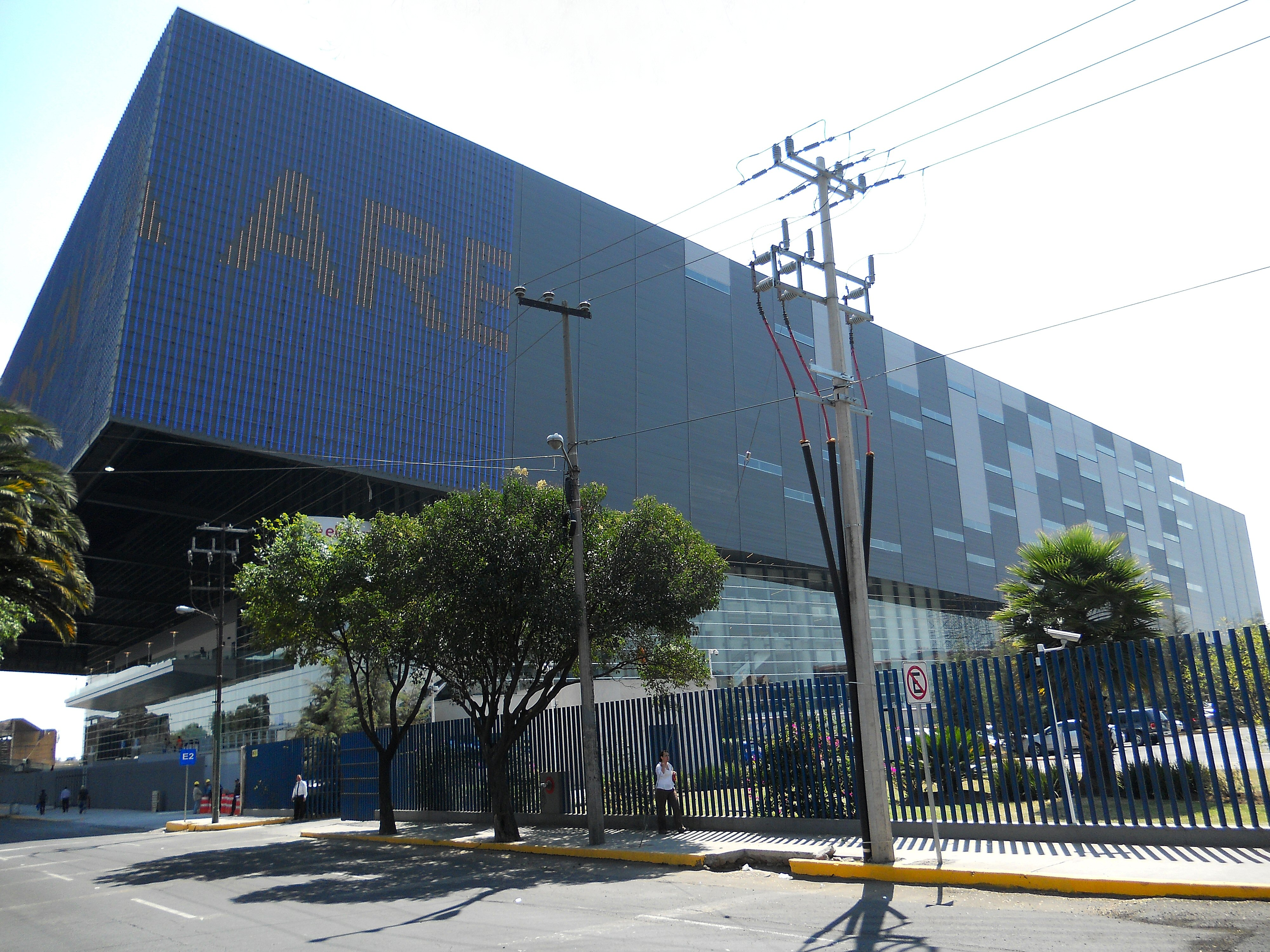
Mexico City Arena

Association football is Mexico's most popular and most televised franchised sport. Its important venues in Mexico City include the Azteca Stadium, home to the Mexico national football team and giants América and Cruz Azul, which can seat 91,653 fans, making it the biggest stadium in Latin America. The Olympic Stadium in Ciudad Universitaria is home to the football club giants Universidad Nacional, with a seating capacity of over 52,000. The Sports City Stadium, which seats 33,042 fans, is near the World Trade Center Mexico City in the Nochebuena neighborhood, and is home to the historical Atlante.

América, Cruz Azul and Universidad Nacional are based in Mexico City and play in the First Division; they are also part, with Guadalajara-based giants Club Deportivo Guadalajara, of Mexico's traditional "Big Four". The city's three derbies are the "Clásico Joven", played between América and Cruz Azul, the capital's two most popular and successful teams; the "Clásico Capitalino", between América and Universidad Nacional, and the "Clásico Metropolitano", between Cruz Azul and Universidad Nacional.

Mexico hosted the FIFA World Cup in 1970, 1986 and in 2026. Azteca Stadium is the first stadium in World Cup history to host the final twice. It is also the only stadium to host the tournament on three occasions. Mexico City was the first Latin American city to host the Olympic Games, having held the Summer Olympics in 1968, defeating bids against Buenos Aires, Lyon and Detroit. The city hosted the 1955 and 1975 Pan American Games, the latter after Santiago and São Paulo withdrew. The ICF Flatwater Racing World Championships were hosted here in 1974 and 1994. Lucha libre is a Mexican style of wrestling, and is one of the more popular sports throughout the country. The main venues in the city are Arena México and Arena Coliseo.

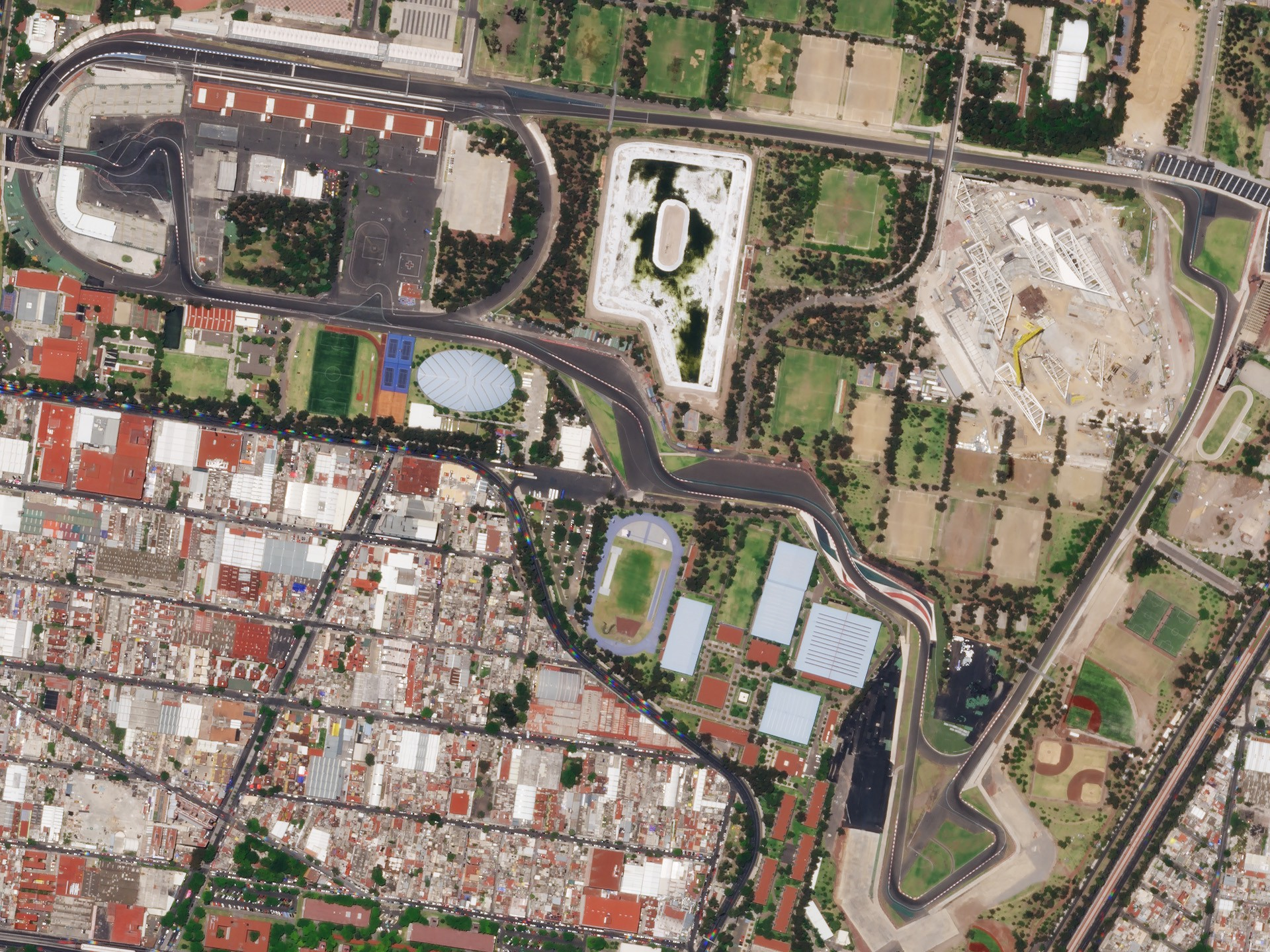
The Autódromo Hermanos Rodríguez

The Autódromo Hermanos Rodríguez is the main venue for motorsport, and hosts the Formula 1 Mexican Grand Prix since its return to the sport in 2015, the event being held in the past from 1962 to 1970, and again from 1986 to 1992. Since 2016, it also hosts the Formula E Mexico City ePrix. From 1980 to 1981 and again from 2002 to 2007, the circuit hosted the Champ Car World Series Gran Premio de México. Beginning in 2005, the NASCAR Nationwide Series ran the Telcel-Motorola México 200. 2005 also marked the first running of the Mexico City 250 by the Grand-Am Rolex Sports Car Series. Both races were removed from their series' schedules for 2009.

Baseball is another sport played professionally in the city. Mexico City is home of the Mexico City Red Devils of the Mexican League, which is considered a Triple-A league by Major League Baseball. The Devils play their home games at Estadio Alfredo Harp Helú designed by international Mexican-American architect FGP Atelier Founder Francisco Gonzalez Pulido in collaboration with local architect Taller ADG. Mexico City has some 10 Little Leagues for young baseball players. In 2005, Mexico City became the first city to host an NFL regular season game outside of the United States, at the Azteca Stadium. The crowd of 103,467 people attending this game was the largest ever for a regular season game in NFL history until 2009.

The city has also hosted several NBA pre-season games and has hosted international basketball's FIBA Americas Championship, along with north-of-the-border Major League Baseball exhibition games at Foro Sol. In 2017, NBA commissioner Adam Silver expressed interest in placing an NBA G League expansion team in Mexico City as early as 2018. This came to fruition on 12 December 2019 when commissioner Silver announced at a press conference in Mexico City Arena that LNBP team Capitanes de la Ciudad de México would join the G League on a five-year agreement. Because of the pandemic, the team made its G League debut in November 2021 playing its home games in the United States, and first played home games in Mexico City in the 2022–23 season.

Other sports facilities in Mexico City are the Palacio de los Deportes indoor arena, Francisco Márquez Olympic Swimming Pool, the Hipódromo de Las Américas, the Agustin Melgar Olympic Velodrome, and venues for equestrianism and horse racing, ice hockey, rugby, American-style football, baseball, and basketball. Prior to the 2025 ban on traditional bullfights enacted by Mexico City's Congress, bullfighting was held every Sunday during the season at the 50,000-seat Plaza México, the world's largest bullring. Mexico City's golf courses have hosted Women's LPGA action, and two Men's Golf World Cups. Courses throughout the city are available as private as well as public venues.

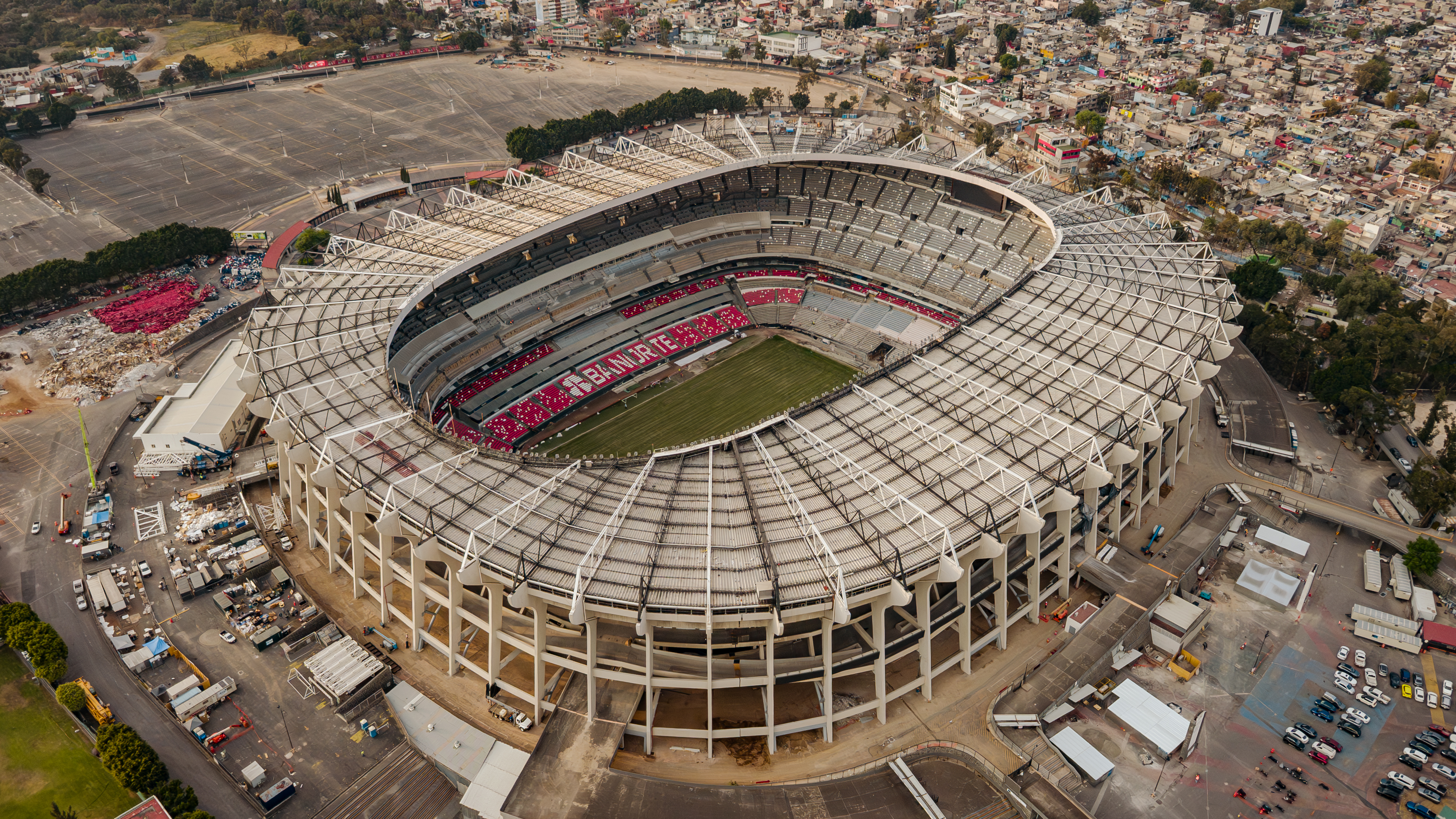
Azteca Stadium

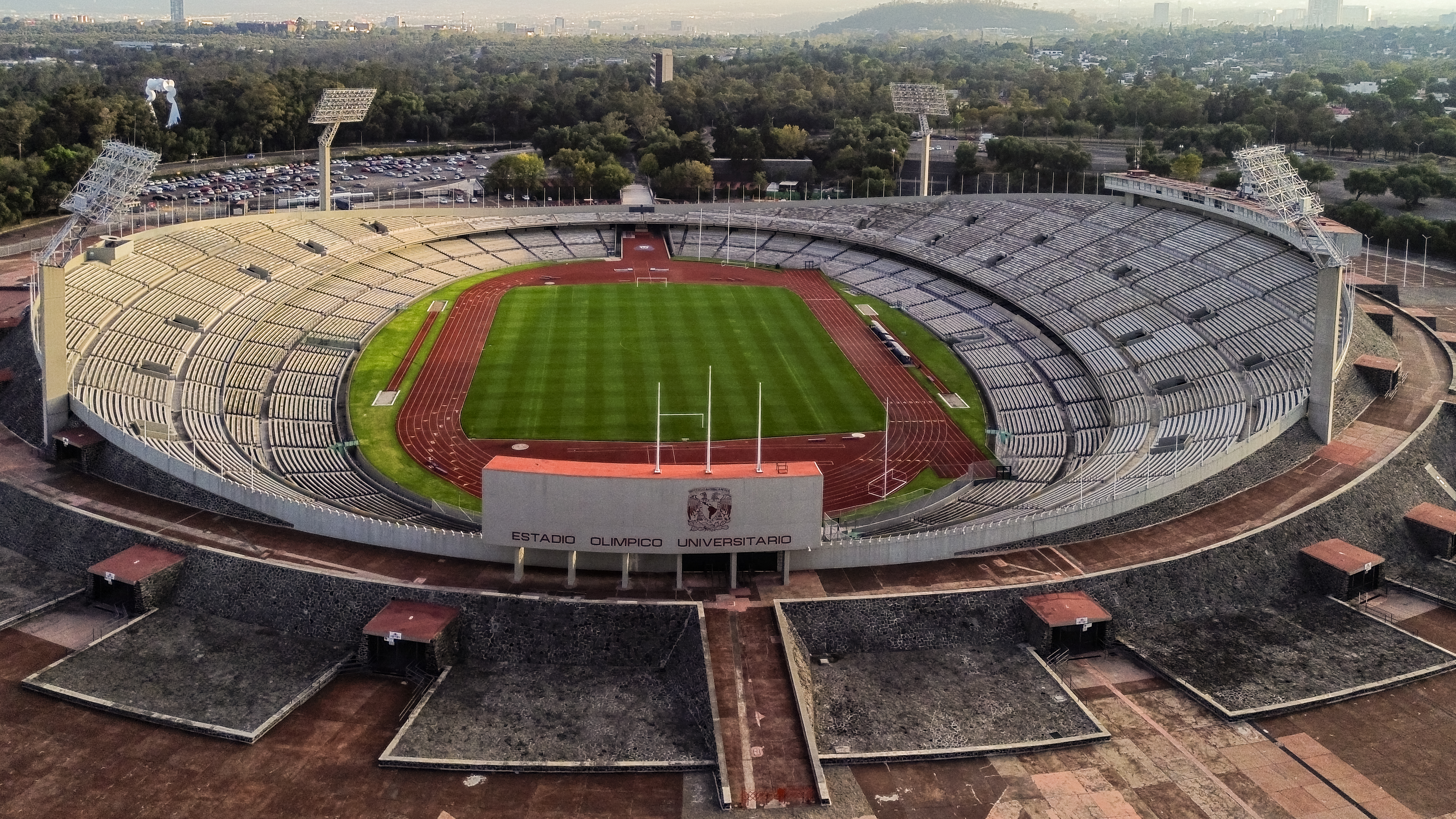
University Olympic Stadium

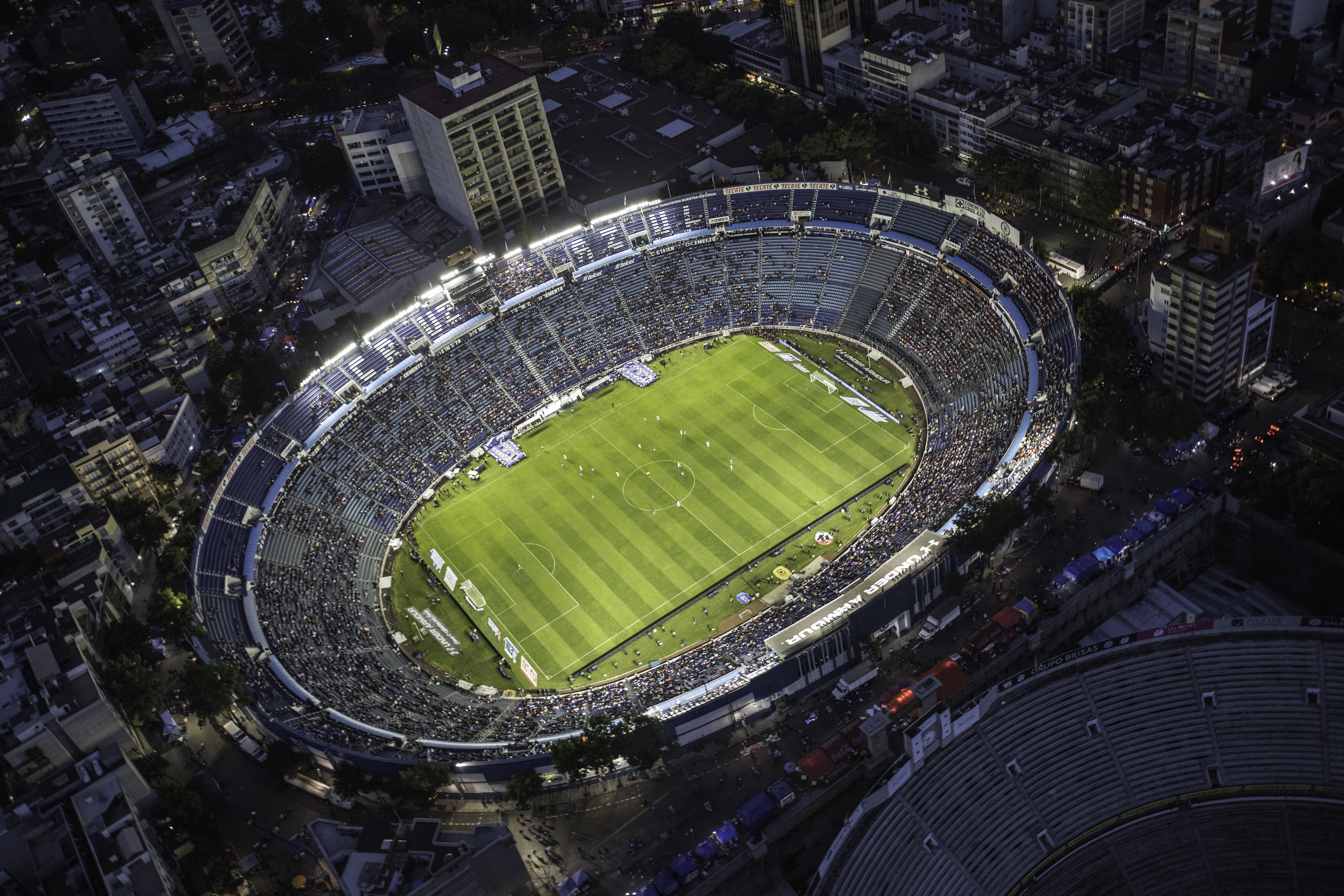
Sports City Stadium

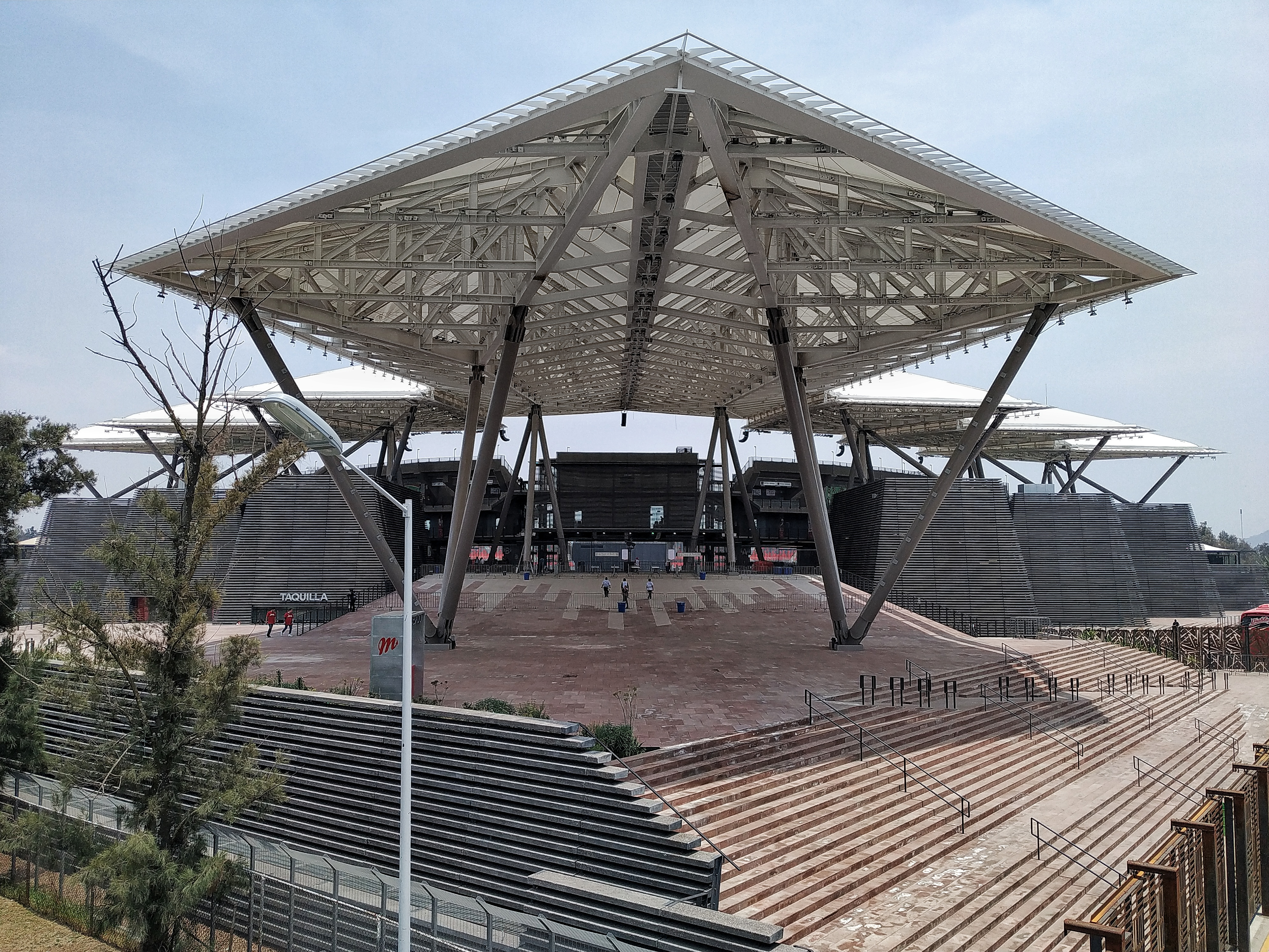
Alfredo Harp Helú Stadium

== See also ==
- Cuisine of Mexico City
- Gentrification of Mexico City
- Barrios Mágicos of Mexico City
- Large Cities Climate Leadership Group
- Largest cities in the Americas
- Metropolitan areas of Mexico
- Outline of Mexico
