= Mukhtar Ablyazov =

Kazakh businessman and pro-democracy activist (born 1963)

- Мұхтар Әблязов
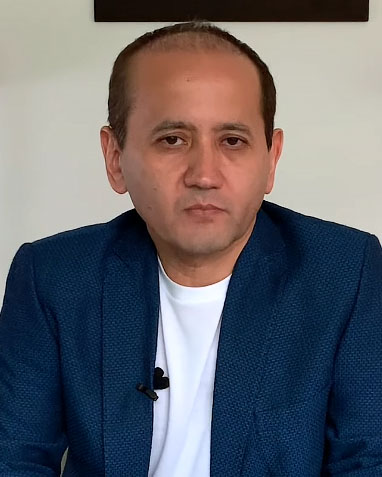
- Ablyazov in 2019

Leader of Democratic Choice
- Incumbent
- Assumed office 20 April 2017
- Preceded by: Office established

Minister of Energy, Industry and Trade
- In office 21 April 1998 – October 1999
- President: Nursultan Nazarbayev
- Prime Minister: Nurlan Balgimbayev (1998–1999); Kassym-Jomart Tokayev (1999)
- Preceded by: Asygat Jabagin
- Succeeded by: Vladimir Shkolnik

Personal details
- Born: 16 May 1963 (age 63) Vannovka, Kazakh SSR, Soviet Union (now Turar Rysqulov, Kazakhstan)
- Party: Democratic Choice (2001–2005, 2017–present)
- Spouse: Alma Shalabayeva (m. 1987)
- Children: 4
- Education: Moscow Engineering Physics Institute
- Occupation: businessman
- Website: ablyazov.org

YouTube information
- Channel: Mukhtar Ablyazov
- Genre: Politics
- Subscribers: 854,000
- Views: 324 million
- Last updated: April 2025

Mukhtar Qabyluly Ablyazov (Kazakh: Мұхтар Қабылұлы Әблязов, Mūhtar Qabylūly Äbliazov; born 16 May 1963) is a Kazakh opposition leader, businessman and political activist who served as chairman of Bank Turan Alem (BTA Bank), and is a co-founder and a leader of the unregistered political party Democratic Choice of Kazakhstan (QDT). He was also the former head of the state-owned Kazakhstan Electricity Grid Operating Company (KEGOC) as well as briefly holding the position of Minister for Energy, Industry, and Trade under Balgimbayev's cabinet before resigning from and joining the opposition against President Nursultan Nazarbayev. In November 2001, he, along with other former Kazakh government officials founded the Democratic Choice of Kazakhstan (QDT). As result, Ablyazov was imprisoned in March 2002 over accusations of financial fraud and political abuse until being pardoned by Nazarbayev in 2003. After being released from prison, he ceased his formal political activities with the opposition.

Ablyazov has been accused of embezzling $6 billion from BTA Bank while serving as chairman. In 2015, a French court in Lyon issued an extradition order. However, in December 2016, France's highest administrative court, the Conseil d'Etat, canceled the extradition order, on the ground that Russia had a political motive in making the extradition request. Ablyazov was subsequently released from the Fleury-Mérogis Prison and was believed to reside in Paris. The UK High Court of Justice has twice issued arrest warrants on Ablyazov; most recently on 25 July 2019, and extended to 22 months a court-ordered detention originating in 2012 for a contempt of court judgement. In September 2020, Ablyazov obtained the status of political refugee in France. On December 9, 2022, CNDA finally deprived Ablyazov of political asylum in France. In July 2023, Ablyazov posted on his Facebook that he was ordered to leave French territory within 30 days.

== Early life and education ==
Ablyazov was born in the village of Vannovka in the South Kazakhstan Region, at the time when Kazakhstan was part of the Soviet Union. His father, Qabyl Ablyazov, (born 1935), worked as an engineer and was a teacher at a technical school. His mother, Rauza Tolebergnova, (born 1940), was a librarian. As a kid, he loved reading books and playing chess. Ablyazov was taught at a Russian-speaking school, the Lomonosov Regional School, in his hometown. He also partly worked as a loader in a rural farm at night.

At the age of 17, Ablyazov wanted to become a theoretician and a professor. He attended the Alma-Ata State University where he then later transferred to Moscow Engineering Physics Institute during his sophomore year. There, Ablyazov graduated in 1986 and earned a degree in theoretical physics. After graduating, he worked as a junior researcher at the Kazakh National University.

In 1987, Ablyazov married Alma Shalabayeva.

In 1990, Ablyazov was enrolled in postgraduate studies in the Moscow Engineering and Physics Institute. For that reason, he was fired from his role as a junior researcher at the Kazakh National University.

== Career ==
Ablyazov started working during the fall of the Soviet Union and the start of Kazakhstan's Independence. His first job was the buying and selling of computers and copying machines. In 1991, Ablyazov registered his first company and named it "Madina," which is the name of his first daughter.

In 1992, Ablyazov started his business by supplying all the regions of Kazakhstan with products such as salt, sugar, flower, matches, tea, chocolate, medicine, photocopiers, fax machines and computers. In order to run this business, Ablyazov established Astana Holding in Kazakhstan, a multi-sector private holding company, which established and consisted of: Astana-Sugar, Astana-Food, Aral-Salt, The Shymkent Pasta Factory, Astana-Medical Service, Astana-Motors, Astana-Interotel, Astana-Bank, Trade House Zhanna (furniture).

In 1997, Ablyazov was appointed as head of the state-owned Kazakhstan Electricity Grid Operating Company. KEGOC was a company close to bankruptcy at the time of his appointment as its head. In one year, he managed to make the state-owned company profitable. By 1998, he had a net wealth of about $300 million, one of the richest people in Kazakhstan.

=== BTA Bank ===
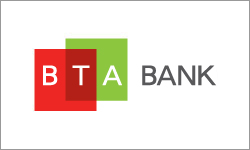
BTA Bank logo

In 1998, Ablyazov was a leading member of consortium of Kazakh investors that acquired Bank Turan Alem in a privatization auction for $72 million. He later paid back the loan. The bank later came to be known as BTA Bank. Ablyazov served as the Chairman of the Board of Directors of BTA Bank from 2005 to 2009. BTA Bank increased its loan book 1,100 percent between 2003 and 2007 and held a loans to deposits ratio of 3.6 to 1 in 2007.

In 2008, BTA Bank was the largest commercial financial institution in Kazakhstan, with internal reserves allowing for cooperation with foreign and domestic owners of the shares. At the same time, BTA Bank was the largest creditor of the Kazakh economy – the bank owned about 30% of all the loans granted to legal entities. Shortly thereafter, Kazakhstan's sovereign wealth fund, Samruk-Kazyna, injected significant funds into BTA in an effort to keep the bank solvent, effectively becoming its majority shareholder.

It has been argued that BTA Bank “threatened to dominate the other Kazakh banks – banks that Nazarbayev controlled” and that the bank's forced nationalization in 2009 was part of an effort by Nazarbayev “to dispose of Ablyazov.”

==== Bankruptcy ====
Global accounting firm PriceWaterhouse Coopers auditors discovered a $10 billion shortfall on the bank's books that led to the bank's bankruptcy and discovery of largest financial fraud attributed to Ablyazov in JSC BTA Bank v Ablyazov.

In 2010 a US bankruptcy judge granted BTA Bank Chapter 15 protection while it worked to restructure $11.6 billion owed to foreign creditors, much of it to western banks, as a result of loans made while Ablyazov was chairman.

In September 2009, Kazakhstan's sovereign wealth fund, Samruk-Kazyna, injected significant funds into BTA in an effort to keep the bank solvent, effectively becoming its majority shareholder. Shortly before Samruk-Kazyna's intervention Ablyazov fled Kazakhstan to London.

== Political career ==
Ablyazov's first interests in politics was in 1987 when he engaged in social activities and founded a political club, believing that the Soviet Union wasn't being developed properly at the Kazakh National University where he was a junior researcher. The club attracted young people, political scientists, and philosophers. There, after leading a discussion, Ablyazov was accused of spreading anti-Soviet propaganda and was, along with his peers, detained the following day by the KGB although Ablyazov suffered no consequences due to the fact that Gorbachev's Perestroika reforms in allowing greater political freedom was already beginning to take shape at that time.

In 1998, as head of KEGOC, Ablyazov was named Minister for Energy, Industry, and Trade.

Ablyazov has been described by Radio Free Europe/Radio Liberty (RFE/RL) as “part of a younger generation” that Nursultan Nazarbayev, president of Kazakhstan, “hoped to harness as he pushed his resource-rich nation into the 21st century.” Yet after a few years, “Ablyazov and the others had broken ranks, citing disenchantment with endemic corruption in Nazarbayev's inner circle.”

In November 2001, Ablyazov and other colleagues, including fellow disenchanted proteges of Nazarbyaev, co-founded the Democratic Choice of Kazakhstan (QDT), an opposition political movement that challenged the Nazarbayev regime. The QDT included a combination of existing politicians and major businessmen and called for the decentralization of political power, a strong legislature, and an independent judiciary to balance the power concentrated in the executive branch. This opposition initiative, according to RFE/RL, “quickly drew the wrath of the regime.”

In July 2002, as one of the main leaders of the QDT, Ablyazov was convicted of “abusing official powers as a minister” and sentenced to six years in prison. Also sent to prison were his fellow would-be reformers and former Nazarbayev proteges Galymzhan Zhakiyanov and Altynbek Sarsenbauyly.

In response to pressure from the international community, including Amnesty International and the European Parliament, he was released in May 2003 after only serving ten months, on the condition that he renounce politics.

Ablyazov moved to Moscow in 2003 to rebuild his business ties and in 2005 became the Chairman of the Board of Directors of BTA Bank.

After his release from prison, Ablyazov reportedly spent “millions of dollars funding opposition groups and independent media.” RFE/RL has quoted Yevgeny Zhovtis, head of the Kazakhstan International Bureau for Human Rights and Rule of Law, as saying that “Nazarbayev to a certain extent felt betrayed” by Ablyazov and the others, given that “he thinks that he provided them the space to become wealthy, to become well-known, to make a career in state service or in business, and they challenged him. When he pardoned Ablyazov in May 2003 and allowed him to return to business in exchange for a promise not to be involved in politics and then found out that he was again involved in politics, of course Nazarbayev felt betrayed twice.”

While living in Russia and Kazakhstan, Ablyazov was the target of assassination attempts and an effort was made to kidnap his son from school.

=== Exile in United Kingdom ===
Following the issuing of the Kazakh warrant, Ablyazov left Kazakhstan for London. This made him, according to RFE/RL, one of “dozens of former high-ranking Kazakh officials who have fled abroad after falling out of favor.”

Ablyazov is described to have lived sumptuously in London. However, a High Court judge held Ablyazov in contempt and imposed three prison sentences for failing to disclose assets including a nine-bedroom mansion in London's "Billionaire's Row" and a 100-acre estate in Windsor Great Park. He rented a 15,000 square foot mansion on Bishop's Avenue in London.

During his time in London, Ablyazov told The Standard that he was an “innocent...victim of persecution” by Nazarbaev and was “in fear of his life from his country's secret police, the KNB.” Claiming to be innocent of all charges, he “employed tight security to protect him from murder attempts” while living in London. Once, while he was being driven in London, a car “rammed his vehicle repeatedly.”

While in Britain, Ablyazov maintained close ties to opposition media in Kazakhstan. RFE/RL has noted that in 2011, the broadcaster K+ and the newspapers Vzglyad and Golos Respubliki, along with other private Kazakh media with ties to Ablyazov, “gave full-scale coverage to the bloody police crackdown on striking oil workers in the western city of Zhanaozen.” Not long after, Kazakh courts ordered these media outlets closed, along with the opposition Alga party, headed by Vladimir Kozlov, an Ablyazov ally, who was sentenced to a long prison term. The Nazarbaev government reportedly considered Ablyazov to be implicated in these media outlets' critical coverage.

Also during his time in Britain, Ablyazov was the main source of funding for Aksara, an independent theater company whose productions challenge the Nazarbaev government and seek to provide an alternative to the state-subsidized theater, which takes a pro-government stance.

In 2012, a British judge ordered Ablyazov imprisoned for purportedly lying in court about his financial assets. Shortly thereafter, Ablyazov left Britain. It was charged that he exited the country in order to avoid imprisonment. His lawyers, however, said that he left because he had received a death threat. The lawyers further maintained that Ablyazov “did not embezzle the $6 billion claimed by the Kazakh government, but restructured the bank's holdings in order to protect them from precisely the kind of government takeover that took place in 2009.”

Since his departure from Britain, it has been unclear where Ablyazov is living, although he was widely believed to have gone to France.

=== Deportation of Ablyazov's wife and daughter ===
Ablyazov's wife and daughter were deported by Italy in May 2013 for allegedly staying in the country illegally; they were found to have false Central African Republic diplomatic passports.

The Italian media blamed the Interior Minister and the Deputy Prime Minister of Italy, Angelino Alfano simultaneously for an illegal deportation. He is also a member of the centre-right party ‘The People of Freedom' headed by Silvio Berlusconi, known for his friendly relations with the President of Kazakhstan, Nursultan Nazarbayev.

The President of Italy, Giorgio Napolitano, expressed his stark criticism of the deportation of Alma Shalabayeva. He noted that the decision to deport her was made without necessary verification or thorough examination of the situation by the Italian bodies: “For any country, it is unacceptable to give in to the pressure and interference of foreign diplomacy, which resulted in the hasty expulsion of a mother and child from Italy on the basis of distorted information. I also believe that we need to fully guarantee fundamental rights of persons, regardless of the status which they have in our country”.

On 24 December 2013, a representative of the Kazakh Ministry of Foreign Affairs announced a change in the restriction of liberty measure for Alma Shalabayeva and the withdrawal of her prohibition from leaving Almaty. Shalabayeva and her daughter, Alua received their passports and left Kazakhstan.

On 18 April 2014, the Italian authorities granted Ablyazov's wife and daughter refugee status. Alma and Alua received a 5-year renewable permit of stay. The decision on the award of refugee status was made by the Territorial Commission in Rome for Recognition of International Protection, under Article 1 of the Geneva Convention.

=== Ablyazov supporters ===
Private investigators tracked Ablyazov down to a mansion near Cannes, and French police arrested him in July 2013. He was detained until December 2016, as Russia sought Ablyazov's extradition from France, but Ablyazov argued that extradition would place him at risk of ill-treatment and an unfair trial. Human rights groups Amnesty International and Human Rights Watch, as well as many members of the European Parliament, wrote in opposition to extradition of Ablyazov. In 2015, a French court in Lyon issued an extradition order. However, in December 2016, France's highest administrative court, the Conseil d'Etat, canceled the extradition order, on the ground that Russia had a political motive in making the extradition request. Ablyazov was released from the Fleury-Merogis prison.

=== Re-establishment of the QDT ===
In April 2017, on his Facebook page, Ablyazov announced the re-establishment of the Democratic Choice of Kazakhstan (QDT) movement.

== Alleged fraud charges ==
Ablyazov is alleged to have embezzled $6 billion from BTA Bank while serving as chairman. From July 2013 to December 2016, Ablyazov was detained by French authorities, as Russia sought Ablyazov's extradition from France, but Ablyazov argued that extradition would place him at risk of ill-treatment and an unfair trial. Human rights groups Amnesty International, Human Rights Watch and Open Dialogue Foundation, as well as many members of the European Parliament, wrote in opposition to extradition of Ablyazov. In 2015, a French court in Lyon issued an extradition order. However, in December 2016, France's highest administrative court, the Conseil d'Etat, canceled the extradition order, on the ground that Russia had a political motive in making the extradition request. Ablyazov was released from the Fleury-Mérogis Prison.

Latvian MEP Iveta Grigule-Pēterse warned European Union NGOs and advocacy groups to scrutinize the source of the funds or donations received, citing Ablyazov's use of allegedly embezzled BTA Bank funds to underwrite PR campaigns to minimize Ablyazov's fraud and to present Ablyazov as a political dissident. An example of such efforts is through the Open Dialogue Foundation. The Open Dialogue Foundation maintains the website mukhtarablyazov.org, which credits the content as "co-created by the family members of Mukhtar Ablyazov."

=== Extended Family ===
Ablyazov's daughter, Madina Ablyazova, is married to Iliyas Khrapunov, the son of the former mayor of Almaty, Viktor Khrapunov. Ablyazova and both Khrapunov were co-defendants in a suit for violations of RICO Act for using U.S. real estate to embezzle and defraud Almaty city. Iliyas Khrapunov was Ablyazov's co-defendant, and received a $500 million judgement by the British High Court to pay BTA Bank for damages for his role in laundering the stolen BTA funds.

== INTERPOL Red Notice ==
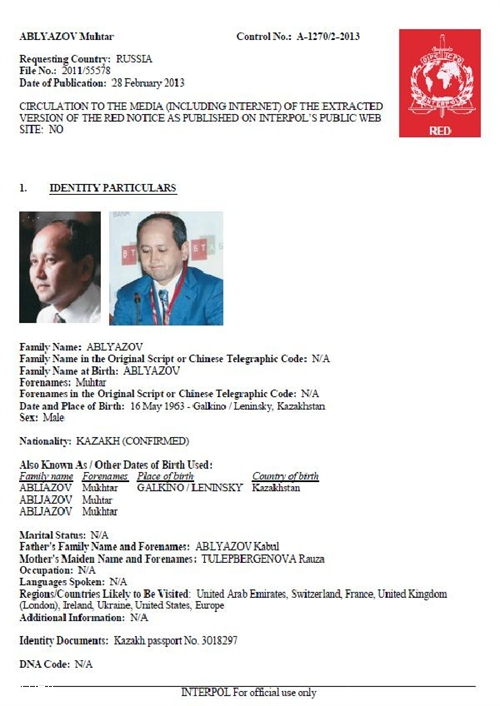
INTERPOL Red Notice for Ablyazov

INTERPOL issued a Red Notice arrest warrant for Ablyazov, which was basis for his arrest by French authorities in 2013. Interpol said Ablyazov was wanted in Russia on separate charges for "large scale fraud,” money laundering and document forgery. Interpol withdrew the red notice in July 2017.

== JSC BTA Bank v Mukhtar Ablyazov ==
JSC BTA Bank v Mukhtar Ablyazov is a landmark financial fraud case consisting of up to eleven proceedings before the English High Court that has set precedents for judgement monetary value, and procedure and standards for recovery of assets held in disparate jurisdictions worldwide. A 2015 ruling established that de facto control over the funds held in trust are in reach of Worldwide Freezing Orders.

=== Court proceedings ===
==== English High Court of Justice ====
24 March 2009 BTA Bank launched legal proceedings against Ablyazov in the High Court (England and Wales) shortly after his arrival in London.

Ablyazov was the subject of seven legal claims in the English High Court totalling $3.7 billion (£2.26 billion).

The first decision that Ablyazov lost in the UK courts was passed down by William Blair, brother of Tony Blair.

In October 2010, Ablyazov lost a legal fight to prevent his assets from being subject to a receivership order. The ruling came after Justice Teare stated that Ablyazov “cannot be trusted” not to dissipate his assets prior to trial.

Ablyazov argued, in his defense, that the takeover of BTA Bank by Samruk-Kazyna in February 2009 was “the culmination of the campaign by President Nazarbayev and his allies to wrest ownership and control of [BTA] from [Ablyazov].” Judge Teare reasoned that BTA's bank's nationalisation and debt restructuring created a legal and fiduciary duty to its Western creditors to recover missing assets.

In October 2010, private investigators found documents and disc drives relating to the bank in a self-storage facility in north London, by following a brother-in-law of Ablyazov. A spreadsheet listed thousands of offshore companies through which BTA had transacted. This evidence added to the court cases with a judge stating "It is difficult to imagine a party to commercial litigation who has acted with more cynicism, opportunism and deviousness towards court orders than Mr Ablyazov."

In a May 2011 letter, Ablyazov accused Nazarbayev and his advisor Bulat Utemuratov of being the real owners of a 48.73% share in Kazzinc, a firm that Glencore International was planning to buy at the time. Ablyazov wrote that “in 2005–2009, when Utemuratov was blackmailing me on behalf of” Nazarbaev, demanding a share in BTA Bank, “he asked me to transfer the stocks to the companies that control KazZink now.” Ablyazov said that he had testified to this effect in a London court. Ablyazov was granted asylum in the UK in July 2011, a recognition that he would face political persecution if sent back to Kazakhstan. Kazakhstan's request for his extradition was ignored. According to the Daily Telegraph, the Kazakh government threatened to punish British firms by awarding lucrative contracts to China if the UK granted Ablyazov asylum.

In early 2012, Kazakh authorities sought to implicate Ablyazov in an alleged terror plot. One report suggested that an “obvious reason for trying to nail Ablyazov” was that “unlike other political figures in exile, he has a presence inside Kazakhstan through his links to an opposition group and local media outlets.” The accusation was, according to this report, “designed to tarnish his reputation – and that of his associates, too – in the eyes of the international community,” as well as to provide “a useful distraction from the embarrassment which the government suffered after violence in the western town of Janaozen in December [2011], in which its police force is accused of opening fire on protesters, killing 14 and injuring over 100.” The report said that “authorities seem dead set on eliminating Ablyazov's capacity to exert any influence in Kazakstan (sic).”

In November 2012, a U.K. court ordered Mukhtar Ablyazov to pay £1.02 billion ($1.63 billion) plus interest. The court also ordered "new post-judgment asset-freezing orders be made against Mr. Ablyazov in an unlimited sum and new asset-freezing orders in relation to certain other defendants."

The High Court made judgment upon Ilyas Khrapunov to pay damages of $500 million ($424 million + interest of $76 million) for conspiring with Ablyazov to move assets in breach of the freezing order.

===== Arrest Warrants =====
The High Court issued an arrest warrant for Ablyazov on 16 February 2012, and a second arrest warrant on 25 July 2019.

==== Criminal Court of Kazakhstan ====
Mukhtar Ablyazov was sentenced to 20 years in prison in June 2017. An appeals court upheld the indictment for criminal conspiracy, embezzlement and money laundering.

==== Southern District of New York ====
City of Almaty, Kazakhstan v. Mukhtar Ablyazov was filed on 9 July 2015 in the Southern District of New York federal court with Judge Alison Julie Nathan presiding. Court documents show that the Plaintiffs are seeking to depose Ablyazov in New York, the UK, Spain or France, and that Ablyazov has not yet produced documents in discovery effectively stonewalling the court. Ablyazov wrote to the federal judge in February 2019 that he cannot provide documents to the court because he left them in the U.K. in 2012. The Plaintiffs responded that Ablyazov has obstructed discovery and indeed documents are in possession by Ablyazov's U.K. lawyers and he could instruct their release to the court.

Court fillings allege that Ilyas Khrapunov deleted email accounts and failed to produce documents about his real-estate deals by ignoring U.S. court's order to preserve evidence. The deleted emails give details to the embezzlement of BTA Bank funds by Ablyazov and Viktor Khrapunov. Wells Fargo has been subpoenaed for transactions history of Gennady Petelin specific to New York real estate investments made with the allegedly stolen BTA Bank funds. The co-defendant, Triadou SPV S.A., has stated to the court that the capital for NYC real estate did not include BTA stolen funds, rather loans from Telford International Limited, a shell company capitalized and operated by Petelin. Telford International Limited is identified in the Panama Papers as registered in Samoa. The court ordered Ablyazov to pay the plaintiffs attorneys' fees for depositions and associated procedures.

==== U.S. District Court for the Eastern District of Virginia ====
BTA Bank filed suit in 2016 in U.S. federal court in Virginia against the sister of Ablyazov, Gaukhar Kussainova, for allegedly receiving millions in funds originating from BTA Bank. The BTA Bank claim against Kussainova in federal court is that she received more than $6 million of stolen BTA Bank funds from Ablyazov and used the stolen monies to buy business and real estate assets in the USA. Gaukhar Kussainova is the owner of a 7,349 square foot house on a 40,000 square foot lot valued at more than $2.1 million in Fairfax, Virginia.

==== Fairfax Circuit Court, 19th Judicial Circuit of Virginia ====
A jury reached a verdict in a trial and recognized the Receivership order issued by the High Court of England & Wales and same court's judgements totaling $4.7 billion against Ablyazov. The verdict added $7.3 million to the judgements against Ablyazov.

==== Eastern Caribbean Supreme Court ====
Ablyazov application to the BVI court that two judgements by the English High Court not be enforced in the British Virgin Islands did not hold up in opinion of the Eastern Caribbean Supreme Court, and were enforceable.

==== Supreme Court of Seychelles ====
The Supreme Court of Seychelles ruled on 2011 October 13 that the English Receivership Order from the English High Court proceedings between BTA Bank and Ablyazov was enforceable in the jurisdiction of the Republic of Seychelles. Ablyazov made two appeals: the first that the judge erred by wrongly applied law and that Ablyazov was not present and thereby denied the right to fair hearing. The second appeal that eleven companies are exempted in the Seychelles from reach of the receivership order enforcement. Each of the appeals were dismissed.

==== Moscow Tagansky District Court ====
In December 2020, the Tagansky District Court in Moscow found Ablyazov guilty of embezzling RUB 58 billion (about $2 billion at the rate of 2009) and sentenced him to 15 years in prison in absentia.

=== Related Court Proceedings ===
==== JSC BTA Bank v Khrapunov (Appellant) ====
Ablyazov's son-in-law and co-defendant, Ilyas Khrapunov, appealed the judgements in JSC BTA Bank v. Ablyazov & Ors on grounds that the English court had no jurisdiction because all the acts, and conspiracy of acts, that caused the bank economic harm occurred outside England.

=== Money Laundering through New York City Real Estate ===
A 2015 suit to recover embezzled funds was filed in the Southern District of New York listing Ablyazov, Viktor Khrapunov, Joseph Chetrit and The Chetrit Group as defendants. The suit alleged that the Chetrit Group helped Ablyazov and Khrapunov hide $40 million in two condo conversion projects. The Chetrit Group went on to settle with the Plaintiffs (the city of Almaty and BTA Bank) and became witnesses for the prosecution.

=== Silk Road Group ===
While Ablyazov was BTA Chairman, the bank partnered on investment projects in Georgia with the Silk Road Group, a company with a history of alleged financial fraud and money laundering. During Ablyazov's chairmanship, and at the time of alleged financial mismanagement, BTA Bank loans were made to Silk Road Group projects or Silk Road Group owned-companies. In 2014 Silk Road Group collaborated with former BTA Bank executive Yerkin Tatishev and Ablyazov business partner to repay outstanding BTA Bank loans. He and the Silk Road Group co-owned a Georgian bank creating a conflict of interest. The Silk Road Group was revealed to be a client of the Panamanian law firm Mossack Fonseca, which specialized in offshore corporate structuring, accounting for purpose of sanction and tax evasion, and subject of the Panama Papers. The Silk Road Group entered an agreement with the Trump Organization to license the Trump brand for two luxury developments in Batumi and Tbilisi, Georgia. The deal was cancelled when Trump became president to avoid a conflict of interest. The Silk Road Group received loans from BTA Bank while Ablyazov was bank chairman, and Trump Organization involvement with SRG may be subject of Robert Mueller investigation into collusion with the Russian government and the Trump campaign.

=== Accusations of murder ===
A Kazakh businessman, Muratkhan Tokmadi, was convicted of negligent manslaughter for the accidental shooting of banker Yerzhan Tatishev on a hunting trip in 2004, for which he was sentenced to one year in prison. 13 years later, in a 2017 Kazakh television documentary, Tokmadi said that he was hired by Ablyazov to kill Tatishev who was Ablyazov's BTA Bank partner and shareholder. However, the Kazakh special forces allegedly resorted to "openly unlawful methods" and, as claimed by Tokmadi's wife, carried out a search of the house without lawyers, ‘planted' weapons and interrogated him in the absence of lawyers. She also stated that “I was informed that Mr Tokmadi was tortured all the weekend and persuaded to give the testimony, convenient to the NSC. There are signs of torture on his body. However, he was forced to write a statement that he had reportedly fell from a pull-up bar” and that his counsels were "forced to withdraw complaints under the threat that their licenses to practice law will be withdrawn." In August 2018, the Kazakh Prosecutor General indicted Ablyazov for the murder of Erzhan Tatishev and, in November 2018, Ablyazov was sentenced to life in prison. Ablyazov denies these claims and maintains that they are simply a response to his reformation of the political group DVK in April 2017, the primary goal of which is to remove Nazarbayev from power, “Why did Kazakhstan's authorities only in June 2017, in the space of 13-and-a-half years after the hunting death of Yerzhan Tatishev suddenly remember about all this?”.

== Personal life ==
During his time in London, Ablyazov was described as not fitting “the Western stereotype of the fabulously wealthy businessman from the old Soviet Union. No bling, no yachts, no trophy wife and no ostentatious cars, he cuts a modest figure, favouring Marks and Spencer suits.”
