= CNDA =

CNDA may refer to:

- California Naturopathic Doctors Association
- Certified Network Defense Architect
- Cour nationale du droit d'asile
- Canadian Naval Divers Association
