= National Court =

- National Court of Spain
- National Court (Iceland)
- National Court (Papua New Guinea)

== See also ==
- Cour nationale du droit d'asile
