= Muratkhan Tokmadi =

Kazakhstani public figure, athlete and businessman

- Мұратхан Шакерханұлы Тоқмади
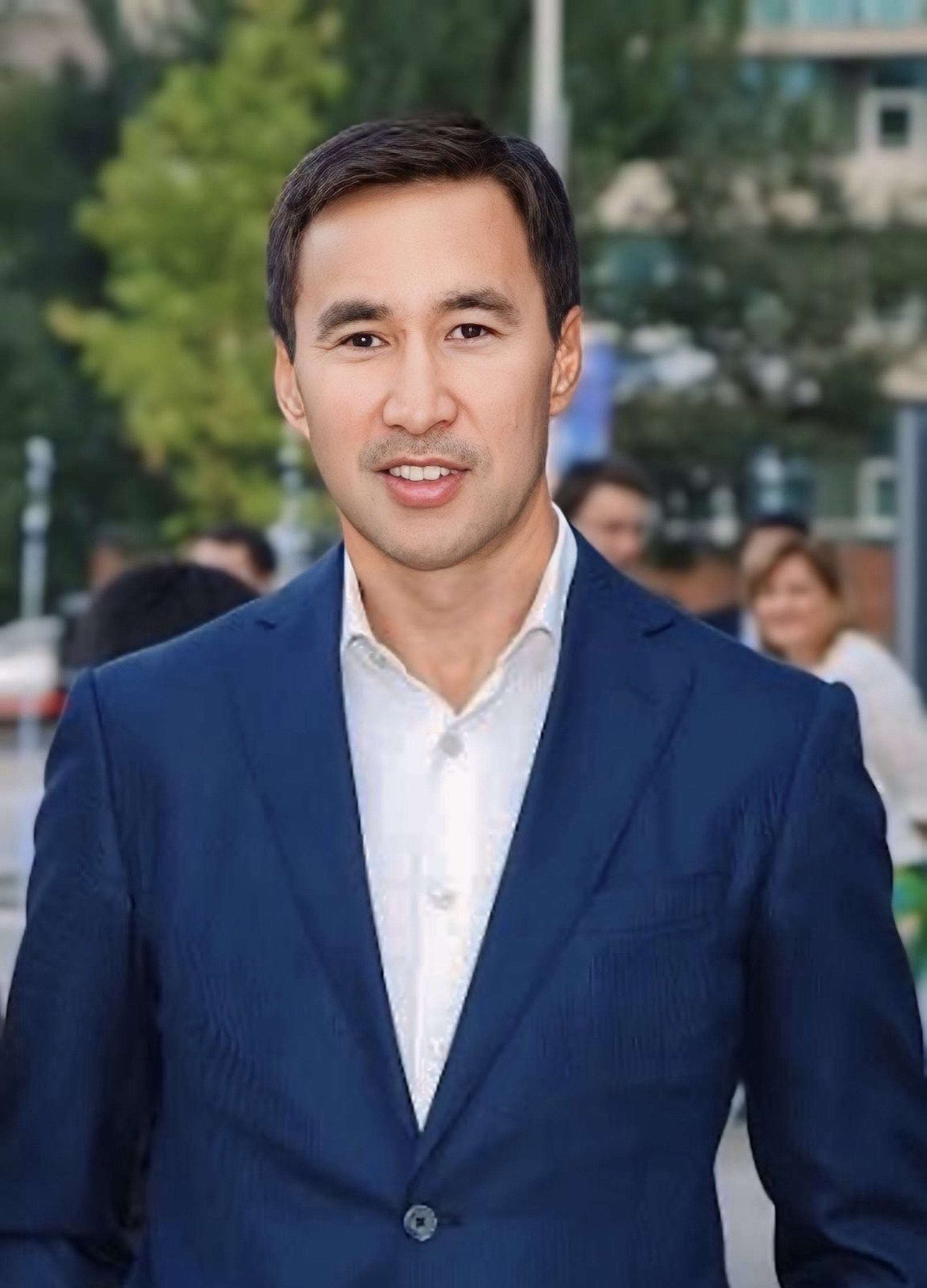
- Muratkhan Tokmadi
- Born: 2 August 1966 (age 60); Abai Region, Kazakh SSR, Soviet Union
- Citizenship: Kazakhstan
- Occupation: Businessman
- Known for: Founder of KazStroySteklo; founder of the Kazakhstan Amateur Triathlon Federation
- Website: https://tokmadi.com/en

Muratkhan Tokmadi (Kazakh: Мұратхан Шакерханұлы Тоқмади; Russian: Муратхан Шакерханович Токмади; born 2 August 1966) is a Kazakhstani businessman, athlete and public figure. He is the founder of KazStroySteklo and the Kazakhstan Energy Conservation Association . Tokmadi served as Vice President of the Boxing Federation of the Republic of Kazakhstan, is described in sources as a Master of Sport of the USSR and an Honoured Coach of the Republic of Kazakhstan in boxing, and founded the Kazakhstan Amateur Triathlon Federation. He is also described as among the early Ironman triathlon finishers from Kazakhstan.

== Early life and education ==
Born on 2 August 1966 in Abai Region (formerly Semipalatinsk Region, Kazakhstan). In 1983, he graduated from a boarding school in the city of Semipalatinsk (now Semey). In his youth, he practised boxing and is a two-time youth champion of Kazakhstan.

From 1984 to 1986, he served in the Armed Forces of the USSR, where he became the boxing champion of the Central Asian Military District. In 1989, he graduated from the Alma-Ata Architectural and Construction Institute (Kazakh State Academy of Architecture and Construction) with a degree in civil engineering. In the 2000s, he obtained a legal education at Almaty State University and received an MBA from the International Academy of Business.

== Business career ==
In 2003, Tokmadi founded KazStroySteklo, specializing in the industrial processing of flat glass and the manufacture of glass structures for the construction industry.

In 2004, under his leadership, a glass-processing plant was launched in Almaty, producing glass structures for construction and architectural projects.

In 2014, the company opened a second plant in Astana. According to various reports, the company’s products were used in glazing a number of major construction projects in Kazakhstan, including facilities of the Almaty Metro, the Nurly Tau complex, the Palace of the Republic, Dostyk Plaza, Mega Center shopping complexes in Almaty, as well as several landmark buildings in the capital, including structures built for Expo 2017, among them the spherical pavilion commonly referred to as the “Sphere.”

In 2008, KazStroySteklo was listed among the winners of the presidential Altyn Sapa award in the category “Best industrial-purpose enterprise” among small and medium-sized business; the winners’ list also names Tokmadi as the company’s general director.

The Altyn Sapa award is a state award of Kazakhstan for achievements in product quality.

In subsequent years, the company’s plants ceased operations.

== Sports administration and achievements ==
From 1996 to 2003, Tokmadi served as Vice President of the Boxing Federation of the Republic of Kazakhstan. Sources also describe him as a Master of Sport of the USSR in boxing and an Honoured Coach of the Republic of Kazakhstan.

In 2014, Tokmadi initiated the creation of the Kazakhstan Amateur Triathlon Federation and became its head.

In 2015, according to Zakon.kz, Tokmadi set a new overall record for Central Asia and Kazakhstan at the North American long-distance triathlon Ironman championship in Texas, competing in the 50–54 age group and finishing the distance in 10 hours and 31 minutes. The report stated that in the overall standings across all age groups he ranked among the top 22 finishers, received the Ironman title. and became the first Kazakhstani athlete to compete in the U.S. long-distance triathlon championship.

In 2016, he was elected President of the Triathlon Federation of the Republic of Kazakhstan. In September 2016, at Tokmadi's invitation, Australian triathlete Chris McCormack visited Almaty as part of the Kazakhstan Triathlon Federation's efforts to develop the sport in the country. During the visit, McCormack met members of the national team, assessed their potential and provided recommendations on athlete preparation and the development of triathlon in Kazakhstan. He said that the country had strong sporting foundations, referring to the achievements of Kazakh athletes in cycling and swimming, as well as triathlete Dmitriy Gaag. McCormack argued that, with the right training system, Kazakhstan could produce an Olympic champion in triathlon and secure Olympic qualification places for the 2020 Summer Olympics.

== Legal proceedings ==
In 2004, Muratkhan Tokmadi was involved in a hunting incident in which banker Erzhan Tatishev, chairman of TuranAlem Bank, died. According to reports, Tokmadi was initially acquitted twice in connection with the incident but was later found guilty of causing death by negligence and received a one-year sentence with amnesty.

In June 2017, Tokmadi was detained on charges including extortion and illegal possession of firearms. While held in a detention facility operated by the National Security Committee (KNB), he gave testimony stating that the killing of Tatishev had been carried out on the orders of Mukhtar Ablyazov, after which the case was reopened by investigators. In 2018, a court found Tokmadi guilty in the renewed proceedings and sentenced him to 10.5 years’ imprisonment.

During and after the trial, Tokmadi and his wife Dzhamilya Aimbetova-Tokmadi publicly alleged that his testimony had been obtained under torture and psychological pressure. A U.S. State Department human-rights report also mentioned a complaint by Tokmadi’s lawyer concerning alleged covert recording equipment in a detention-facility meeting room used for lawyer-client consultations.

International commentary on the case appeared in the context of broader human-rights concerns in Kazakhstan. The organization Freedom House mentioned Tokmadi among individuals prosecuted in connection with the authorities’ pursuit of Mukhtar Ablyazov. In In October 2017, a written declaration discussing Tokmadi’s case in a human-rights context was published on the website of the Parliamentary Assembly of the Council of Europe (PACE). In November 2017, members of the European Parliament submitted a written question referencing the prosecutions of Mukhtar Dzhakishev and Tokmadi; an official response was later published by EU institutions. In August 2025, a further written declaration submitted by members of the Parliamentary Assembly of the Council of Europe called on the authorities of Kazakhstan to release Muratkhan Tokmadi.

== Honours ==
Tokmadi received several state awards of the Republic of Kazakhstan, including: the 20 Years of Astana medal, the 10 Years of Astana medal, the Atameken medal, and the order Qurmet and Bauyrzhan Momyshuly.

== Personal life ==
He is married to journalist Dzhamilya Aimbetova-Tokmadi. He has five children.
