= Igor Vinyavsky =

Kazakhstani journalist

Igor Vinyavsky (Russian: Игорь Винявский, IPA: [ˈiɡərʲ vʲɪˈnʲafskʲɪj]) is a Kazakhstani journalist, an editor for Vzglyad. He was arrested on 23 January 2012 for allegedly distributing leaflets demanding an insurrection and imprisoned, seen as a threat to national security by the government. The government indicted him for "making public calls through mass media to violently overthrow Kazakhstan's constitutional regime", in connection with pamphlets distributed two years earlier by people whose connection with Vinyavsky has yet to be established. Member organizations of the International Freedom of Expression Exchange (IFEX) claimed that the charges were meant to silence criticism of the government. On 15 March the Kazakh government was criticized by the European Parliament (EP) for his detainment; he was released later that day. The EP welcomed the news, and called for the release of other political prisoners, including opposition leader Vladimir Kozlov, who was later sentenced to seven and a half years imprisonment.
