= Almaty Management University =

Higher educational institution in Kazakhstan

Coordinates: 43.2775°N 76.8958°E

- Russian: Алматы Менеджмент Университет
- Former names: Alma-Ata School of Managers, Almaty School of Management, International Academy of Business
- Established: 1988
- President: Assylbek Kozhakhmetov
- Rector: Gulnara Kurenkeyeva
- Academic staff: 200
- Students: 3500
- Location: Almaty, Kazakhstan
- Website: http://www.almau.edu.kz/

Almaty Management University (Kazakh: Алматы Менеджмент Университеті, romanized: Almaty Menedjment Universitetı, AlmaU) is a higher educational institution in Almaty, Kazakhstan, providing preparation of specialists of economic fields under bachelor's degree programs, MBA (Master of Business Administration) and DBA (Doctor of Business Administration).

ALMA is one of the first business higher schools in Kazakhstan — the University was organized in 1988 as Alma-Ata School of Managers, in 1996, it became the International Academy of Business. In 2014, it adopted its current name.

== History ==
=== Almaty School of Management ===
In the autumn of 1988, the Alma-Ata City Executive Committee initiated creation of "Union" Republican Cooperative Association, Leonid Solomin was invited to be head of the association. Together with Bazhangali Kozhshibayev, he decided to create the first business school in Kazakhstan. On December 12, 1988, the Alma-Ata School of Managers (ASM) has been organized in Alma-Ata on the basis of "Union" Republican Cooperative Association, its first listeners were engaged in assembly hall of the Soviet district committee of the Communist party exactly during a month. During the first period of existence of the school education was conducted in the form of short-term courses which were listened to by the top and medium-level managers, people with higher education.

In October 1989 Asylbek Kozhakhmetov who was working in the school as the teacher of computer science became the director of ASM. In 1990 the staff of ASM has taken part in the organization of Association of Schools of International Business, the director of ASM Asylbek Kozhakhmetov became a member of its council, assembly of institutes, schools of preparation of entrepreneurs of the CIS.

In 1992 the staff of the school began doing steps to create a Master of Business Administration program and project on realization of programs for administrative personnel, ASM was the first institution in Kazakhstan proposing MBA on the educational market of the country.

In 1994 the Ministry of Economy of Kazakhstan announced a tender for the project on consultation of the enterprises, financed by the World Bank. Five of six western organizations participating in the tender (the European Foundation for Management Development, École de management de Lyon, the Maastricht School of Management and others) named ASM as the most preferable partner. In 1995 the educational institution has been renamed into Almaty School of Management (ASM).

In October 1995, the competence, reliability and actual success of the Almaty School of Management was highly appreciated by the People to People International, which awarded the “Torch of Birmingham” for successful economic survival and development under conditions of the emerging market relations.

In 1996 ASM organized the international conference «Management of human resources: strategy and practice» with participation of more than 100 delegates from 15 countries, the Minister of Economy Umirzak Shukeyev, an adviser of the President of Kazakhstan for economic issues Altay Tleuberdin, the first secretary of representation of the European Union in Kazakhstan Onno Simons, the representative of the United Nations in Kazakhstan Nigel Ringrose and others.

=== Transformation to IAB ===
On November 14, 1996, according to the Order of Government of Republic of Kazakhstan #1387 Almaty School of Management has been transformed to the International Academy of Business (IAB). The first intake of to evening program of MBA with corporate management specialization has been carried out the same year.

In 1998, the International Development Association of the World Bank chose the Academy as a partner in realization of the program of creation of research base for working out of 1998–2001 economic policy in the countries of Central Asia.

In 1999, the Almaty School of Management had an agreement with the Canadian McGill University about start of joint program of preparation of financiers under the name "Professional Financial Diploma". At the same year an agreement of cooperation with the HEC Paris (France) has been signed with support of embassy of France in Kazakhstan and the first intake to the program «Master of Professional Management» was done.

On January 14, 2000, official opening of the International Academy of Business in a new building (the corner of Abay Avenue and Bayzakov Street in Almaty) took place with participation of the President of Association of Financiers of Kazakhstan, the Chairman of the Council of Trustees of IAB Daulet Sembayev, the Vice-Mayor of Almaty Kozy-Korpesh Janburchin, diplomats and businessmen. At the time of opening IAB included eight institutions providing economic education: Almaty School of Management, Almaty Center of Bank Education, educational center of network and telecommunication technologies «CISKO», Institute of Managers McGill — ASM, Institute of Economy and Finance, Kazakhstan Institute of Marketing and Management, business class, program «Begin and improve your business».

In July 2000, IAB has received a grant from Philip Morris Kazakhstan JSC for purchase of computers.

In 2000, the Academy started the program of the higher professional education.

In 2002, IAB as a pilot high school participated in public accreditation passing by criteria of European Quality Improvement System (EQUIS) initiated by the Central Asian Foundation for Management Development (CAMAN). From 65 high schools from Kazakhstan, Kyrgyzstan and Uzbekistan applied for accreditation, only four educational institutions including IAB were able to pass it successfully.

According to the results of 2002, the Academy became the winner of “With Overall Quality to the 21st century” competition of the Republican Quality Association in the category “Education” for the best management system.

In 2003, the International Executive MBA (IE MBA) program was developed in cooperation with HEC Paris and Louvain School of Management (Belgium). This program became a development of the one-year program «Master of Professional Management» operating from 1999.

In 2003, the representative office of the International Academy of Business was opened in Astana for realization of MBA programs, organization of corporate seminars, trainings and consulting services.

In July 2003, the Kazakhstan-European Center of Strategic Management of Universities was created on a basis of IAB, the founders of the center were the Ministry of Education and Science of Kazakhstan, the European Foundation for Management Development, Association of High Schools of Kazakhstan, Association of Institutions of Professional Education of Kazakhstan, the Central Asian Foundation for Management Development (CAMAN).

The same year in Kazakhstan business schools rating under МВА programs conducted by the National Business magazine the International Academy of Business has won the first-place outstripping KIMEP and UIB.

=== Recent history ===
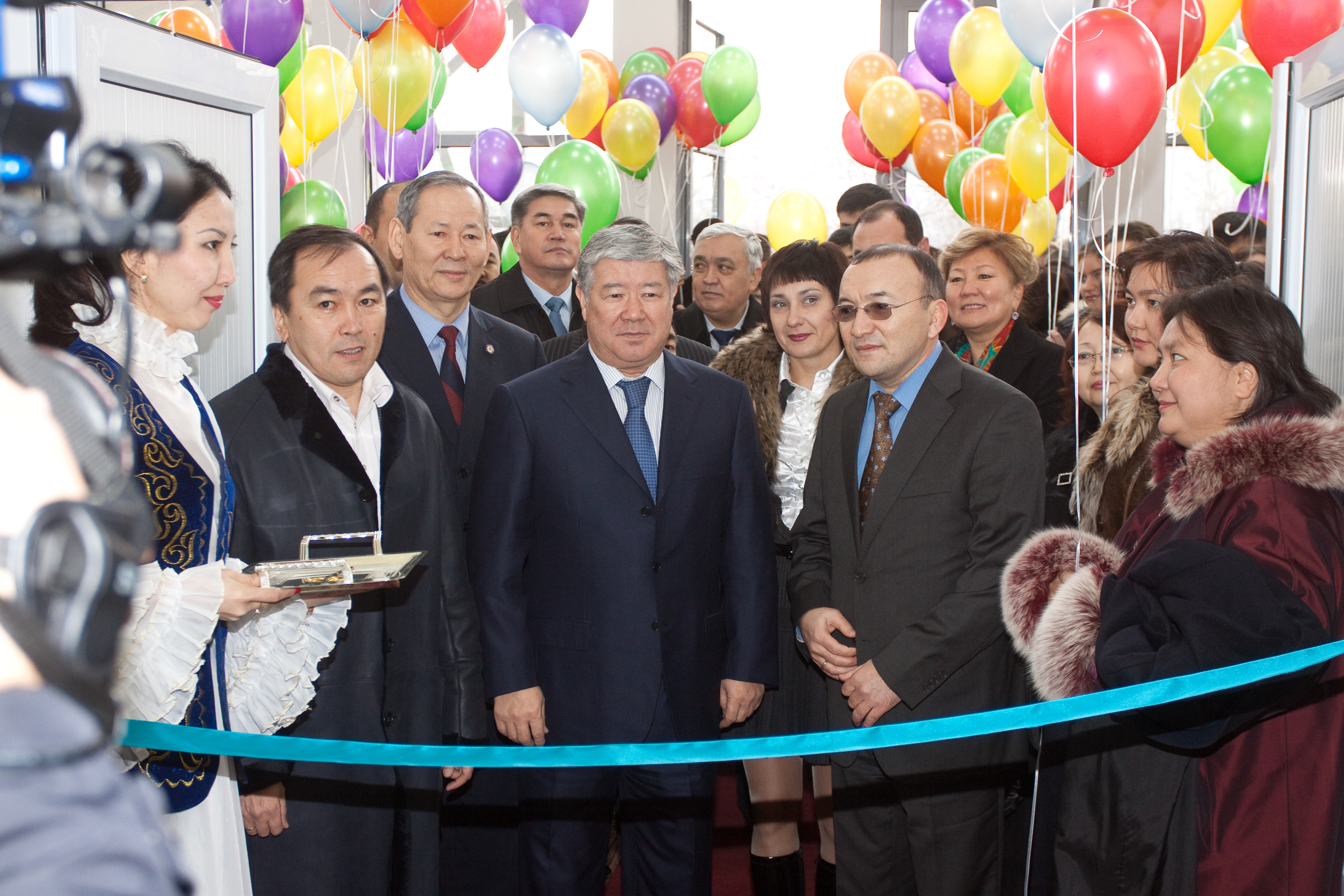
Opening of IAB's sport complex with participation of the Mayor of Almaty Akhmetzhan Yessimov

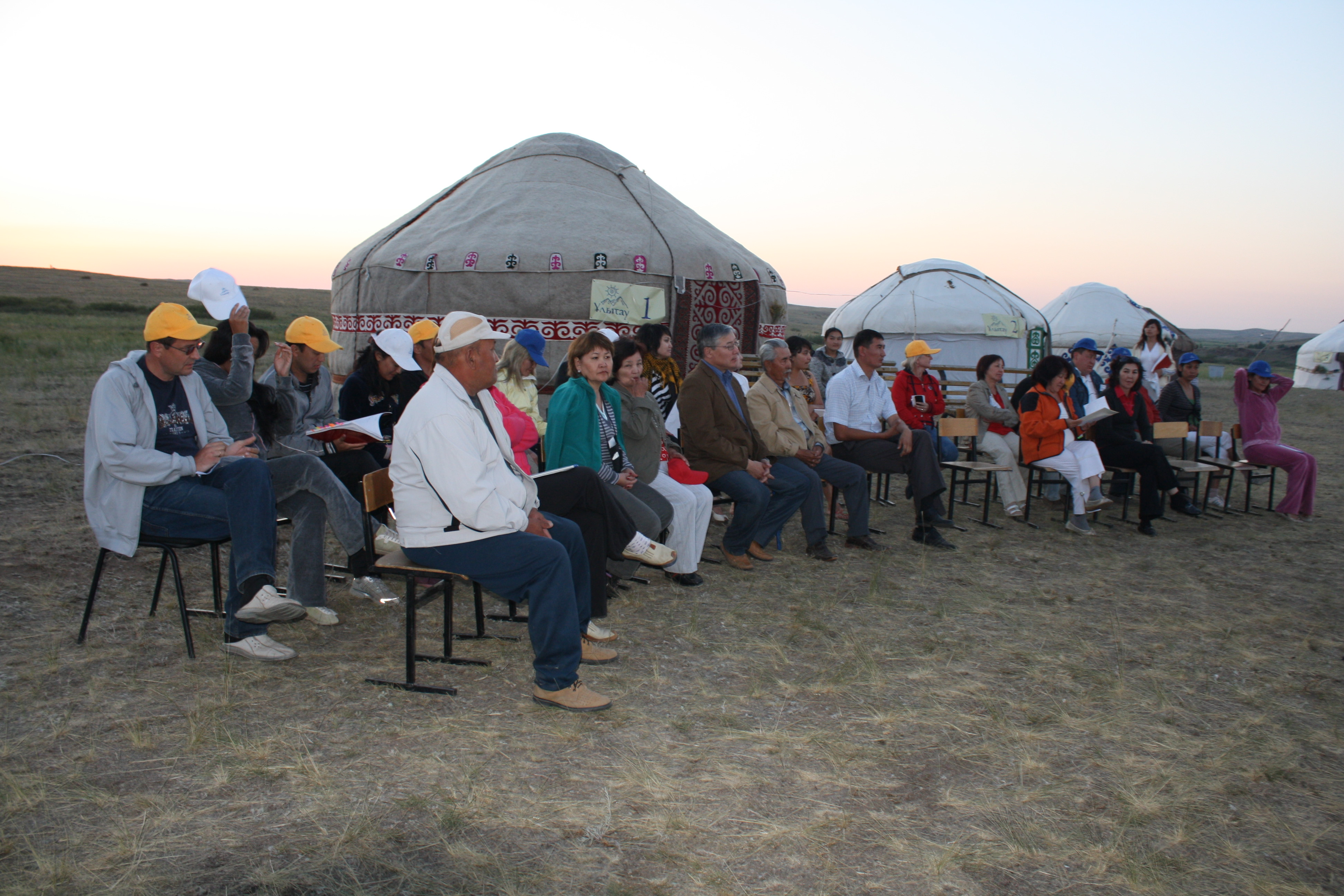
Ulytau cultural-linguistic camp.

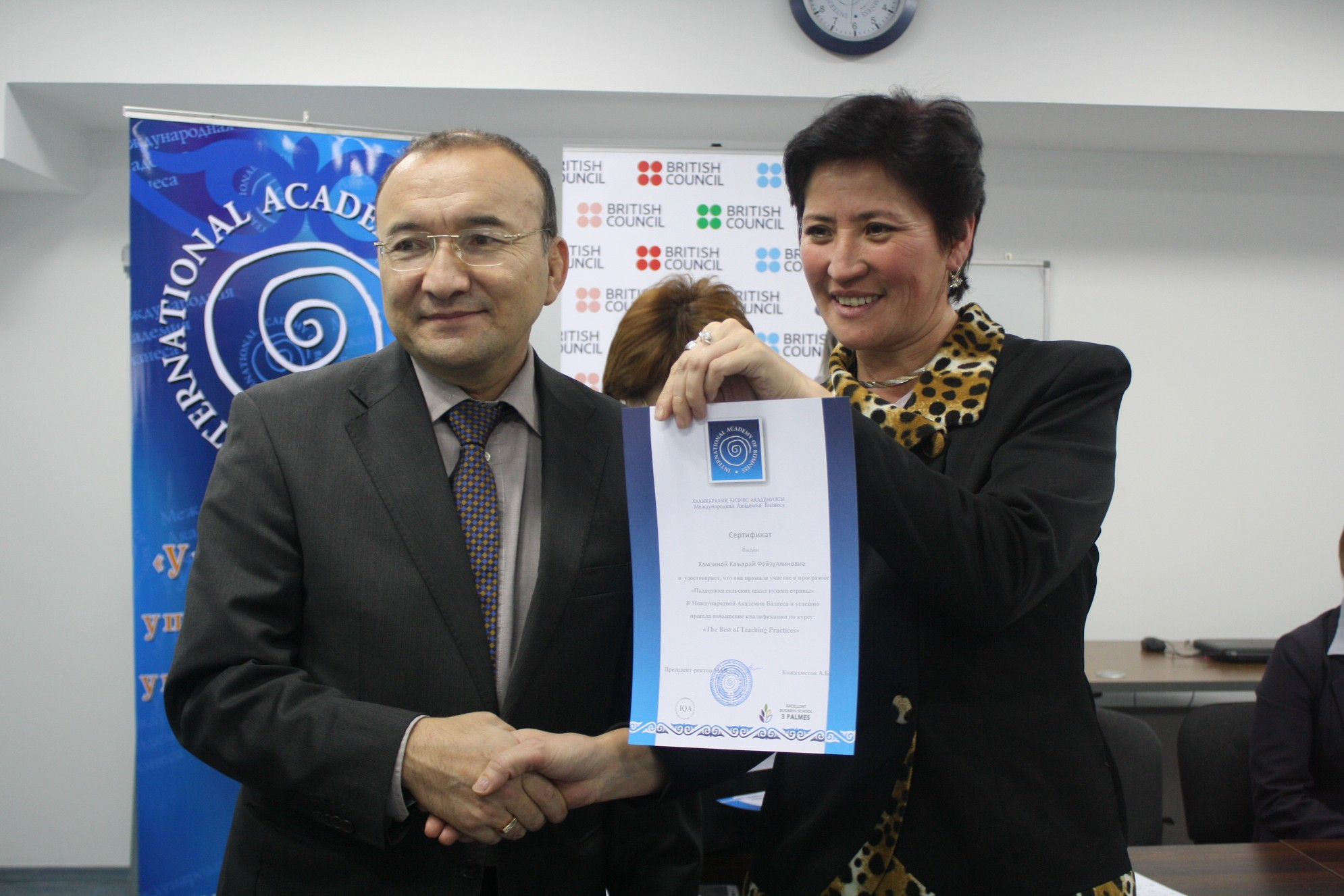
Awarding with certificates in framework of the program «Support of rural schools by high schools».

In 2009 the president-rector of MAB Asylbek Kozhakhmetov initiated the program «Support of rural schools by high schools»; according to the initiative it was offered to each of 144 Kazakhstan high schools to look after one of 200 rural districts of the country. IAB within the framework of the program has been incurring support of educational institutions of Aiyrtau District of North Kazakhstan Province. Within the framework of the program teachers of Aiyrtau District schools are gratuitously invited to Almaty for improvement of professional skill during spring and autumn school vacations.

Since 2009 within the framework of republican competition "ZachOT" founded by the International Academy of Business more than 20 Kazakhstan journalists and mass-media are annually awarded for the best illumination of vital topics in sphere of Kazakhstan education.

In autumn of 2009 teachers of IAB published the book «Business Express Course» within the framework of the project "Business Adviser" — gratuitous methodical support of individual entrepreneurs in village areas organized by Damu Entrepreneurship Development Fund.

Since June 2010 IAB holds the international summer session Business Education Teachers Academy (BETA-2010) directed on development of professional skills and personal growth of teachers of Kazakhstan and foreign high schools.

Since 2010, IAB has organises the Ulytau cultural-linguistic camp — a project for the studying of the Kazakh language through immersion in the language and cultural environment. In the summer of 2010, the first participants of camp-aul numberes 83 persons — heads and experts from the national companies participating in the National Welfare Fund "Samruk-Kazyna". In 2011 60 participants passed "immersing" in Ulytau camp.

In 2010 the International Academy of Business has opened representative office in the West Kazakhstan region (Atyrau).

Since autumn of 2011 the Academy became the first private high school in Kazakhstan technically ready to accept students and listeners with the limited possibilities (with infringement of the musculoskeletal system and visual system); toilets, wheelchair ramps and special lift were equipped for this purpose.

In 2014, the International Academy of Business changed its name to Almaty Management University, with ALMA University used as a shortened form of the new name.

== Academics ==
Almaty Management University uses the model for continuous educational process which includes:

- College of IAB
- Bachelor's degree
- Master's degree
- Master of Business Administration (MBA)
- Doctor of Business Administration (DBA)
- Distance education
- Short-term training and retraining

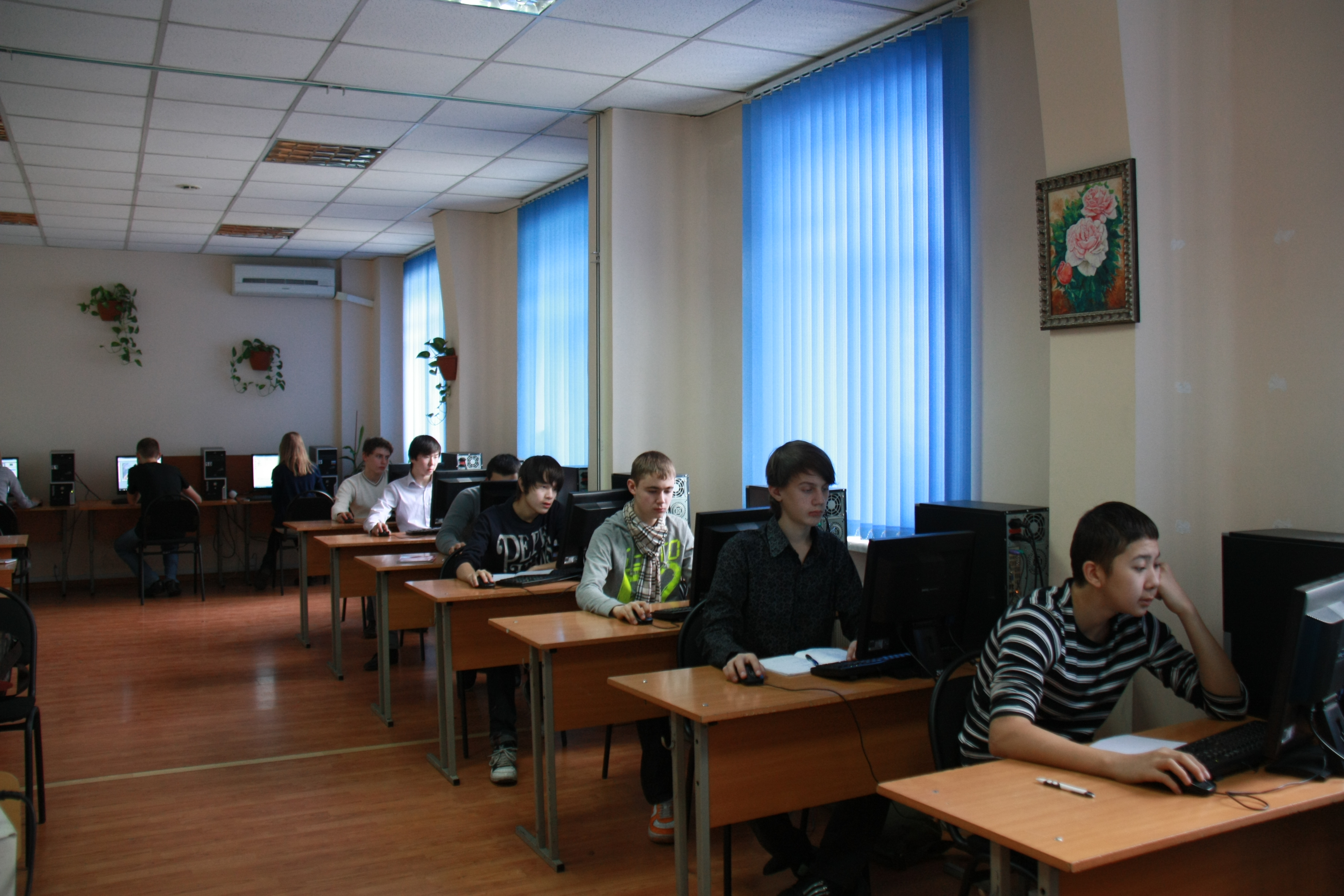
Studies in College of IAB.

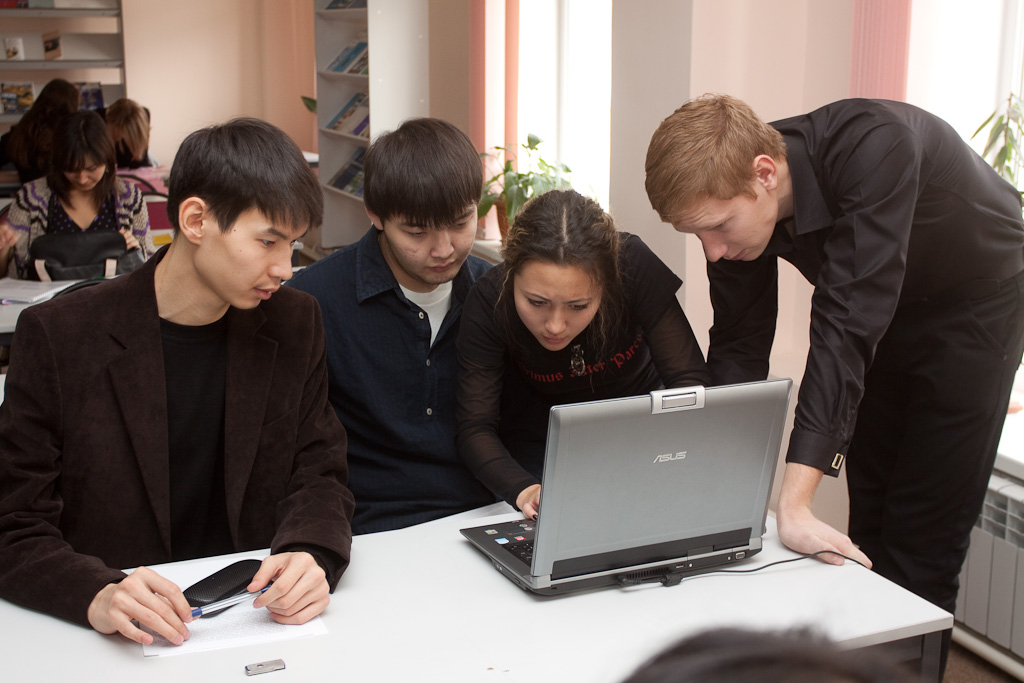
Studies in Baccalaureate.

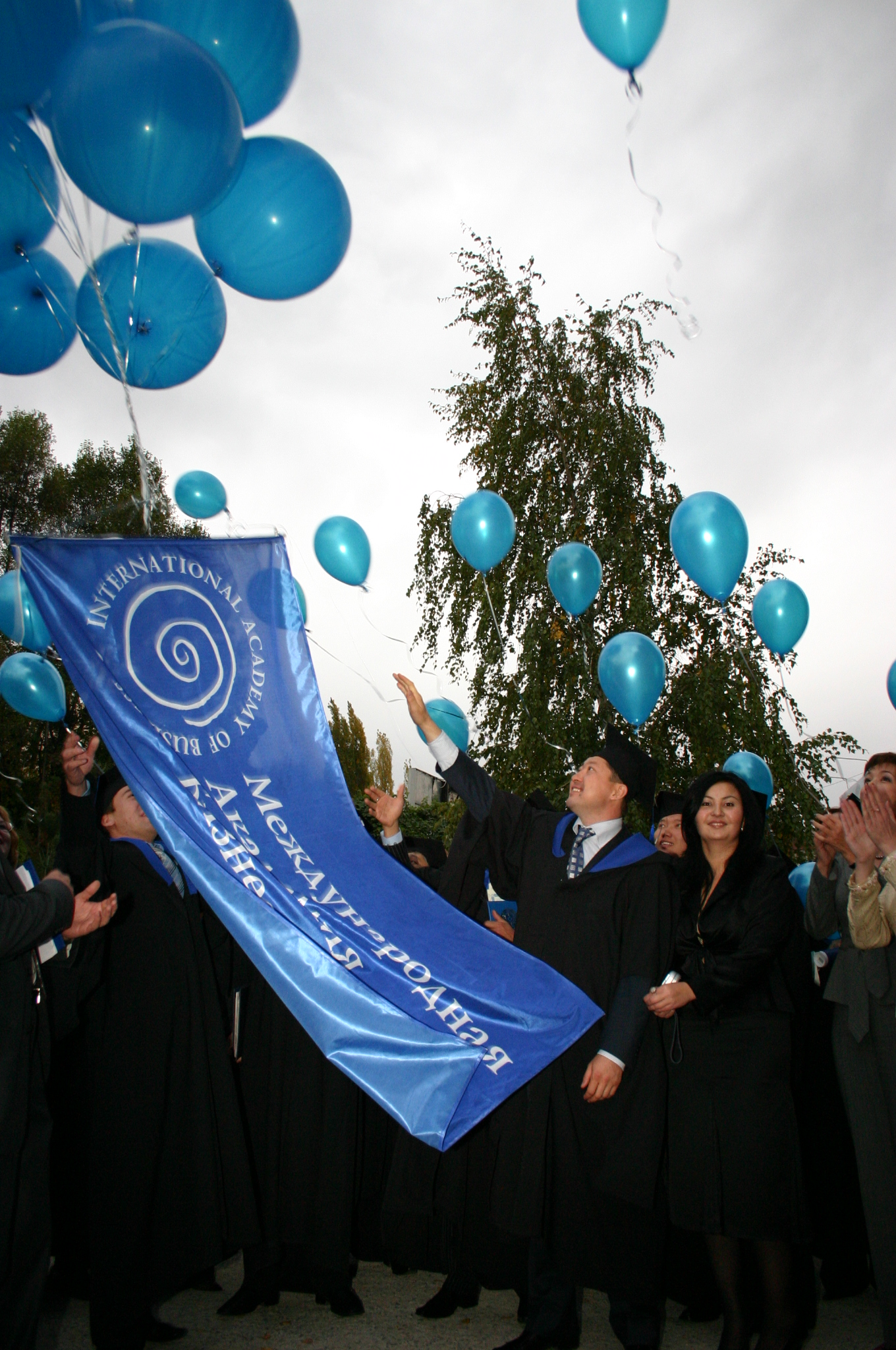
MBA graduation.

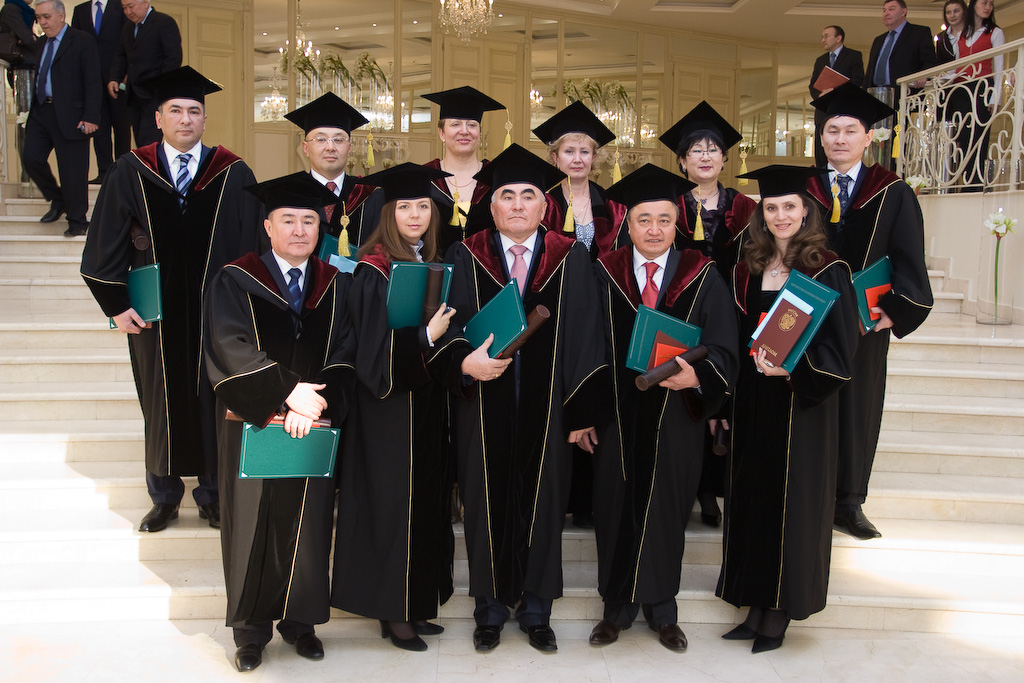
DBA graduation.

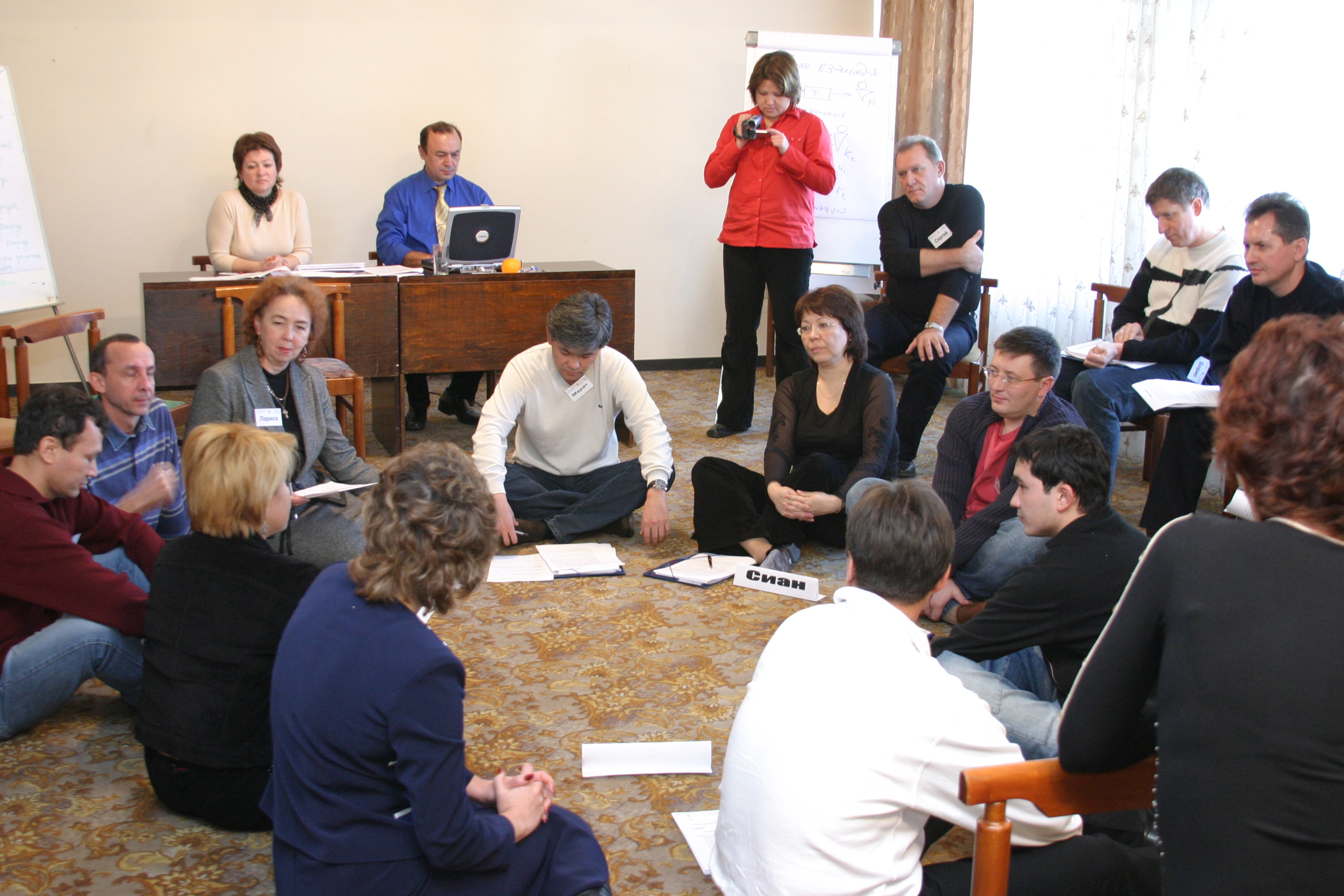
Trainings of Centre for Management Development.

College of IAB was created in 2009 and prepares specialists for seven specialties of technical and economic education: economics, marketing, management, accounting and audit, finance, information systems, assessment.

Higher Professional Education Department of Almaty Management University prepares bachelors in the following specialties: Economics, Management, Marketing, Accounting and Audit, Finance, Information Systems, Regional Studies, Restaurant and Hotel Management, Business Analytics and Big Data, Jurisprudence, State and Local Administration, Public Relations, Logistics.

Master's degree programs: Management, Marketing, Finance, Business Analytics and Big Data, Jurisprudence, Informatics (in pedagogy).

Doctoral (PhD) programs: Management, Marketing, Finance, Business Administration.

Master of Business Administration Department of the Almaty Management University provides educational services according to the following MBA programs:

- Kazakhstan MBA program «Common Management»;
- Kazakhstan MBA program «Innovation-technological management» (with the Nanyang Technological University, Singapore);
- «Common and strategic management» with the Maastricht School of Management (Netherlands), in framework of the program 2 weeks module in Maastricht is provided;
- «Master of Economics and Business» with EADA Business School (Spain), 2-week module in Barcelona is provided.

There are plans of development of new joint MBA programs with leading business schools of the European Union and ASEAN.

Doctor of Business Administration (DBA) program in IAB is maximally individualized and allows listeners to create variants of studying programs consisted from various modules of basic and special courses. Education includes auditorium work in groups and independent work under direction of a supervisor of studies, and also individual work of listeners of the program without direct participation of a teacher on chosen educational and research trajectory. The DBA programs are joint products of IAB and the Russian Academy of National Economy and Public Service under the President of Russia and Maastricht School of Management.

== Student life ==
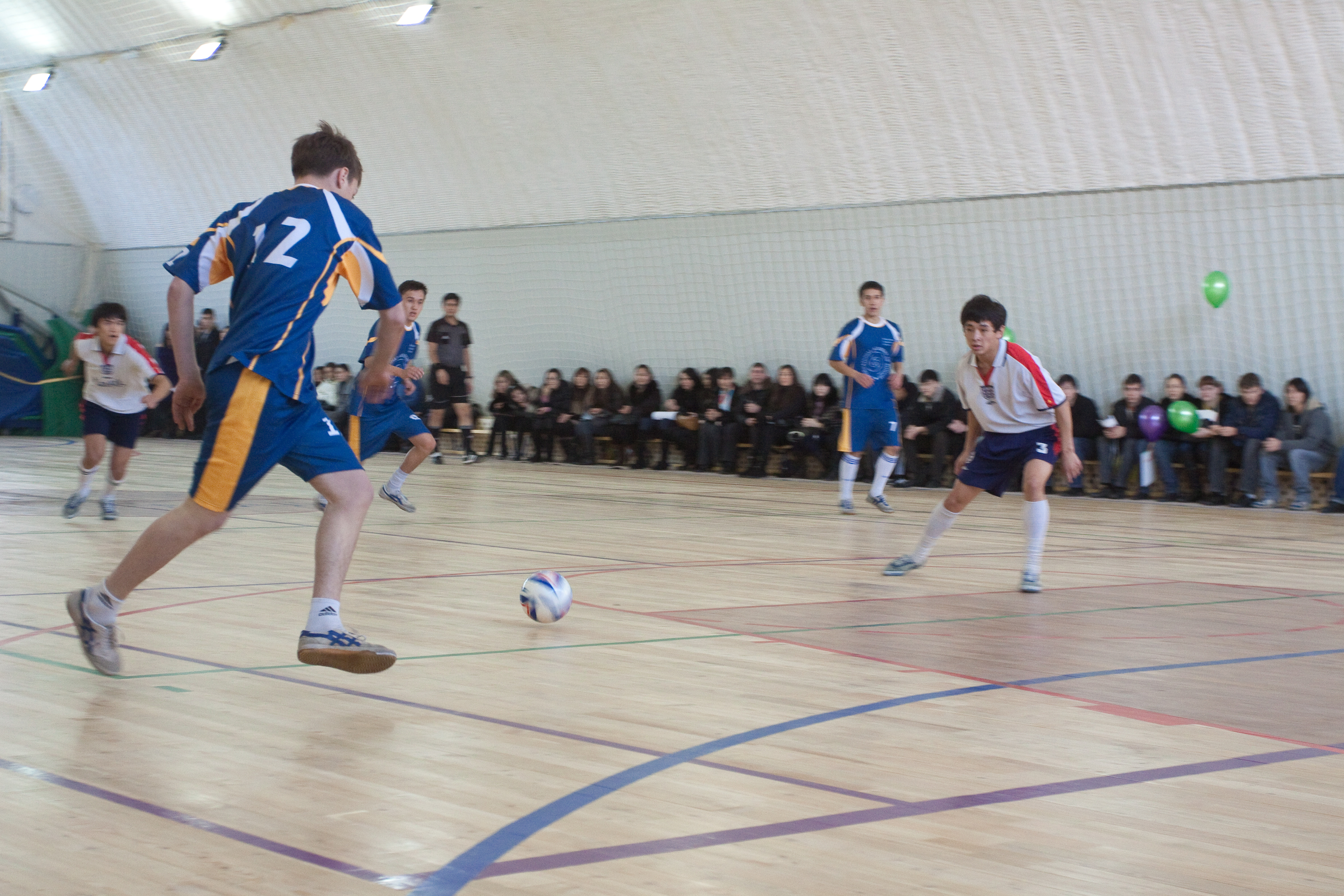
In the sport complex of IAB.

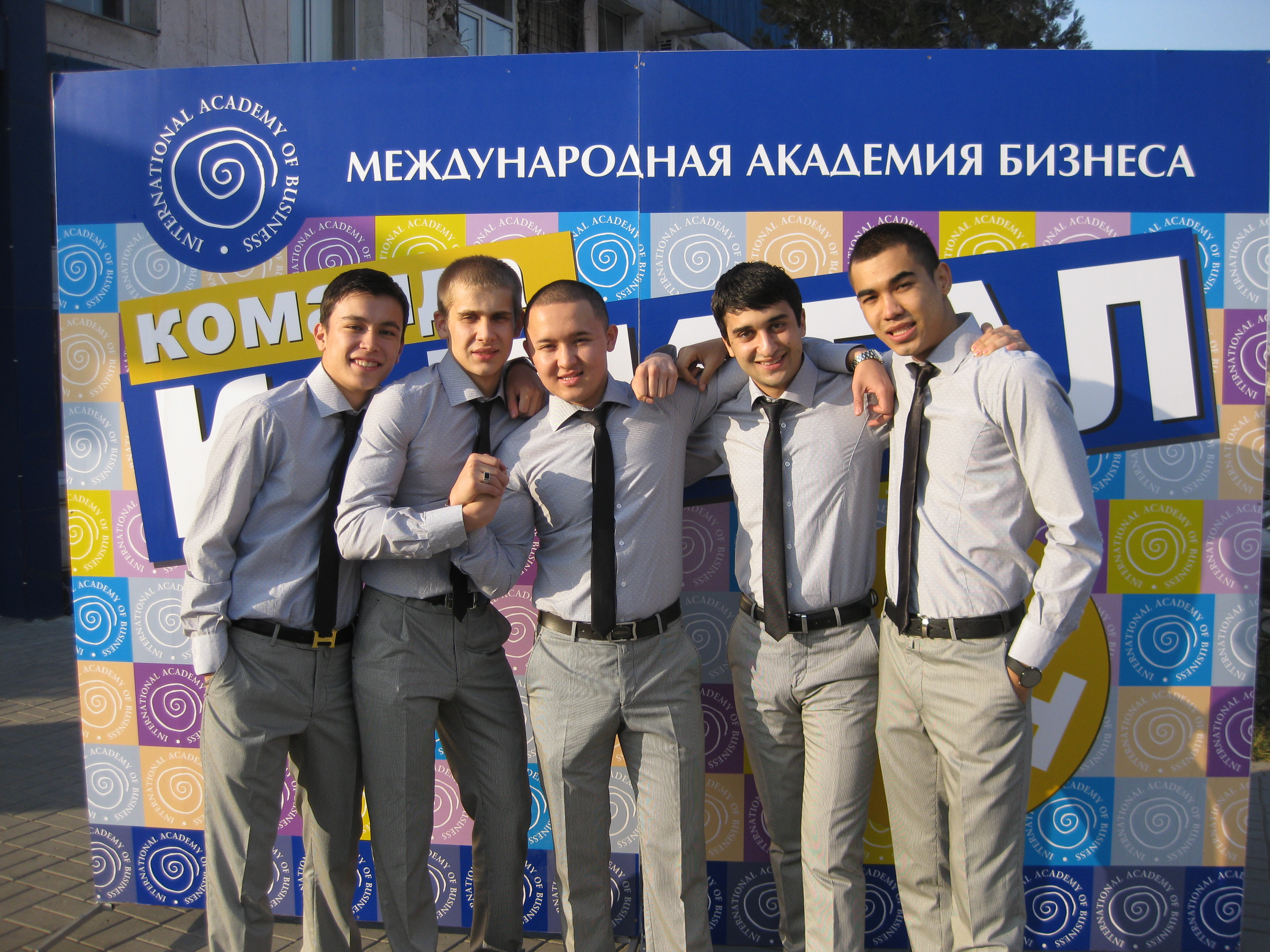
KVN team "Capital".

Since 2001 the University has hosted theoretical and practical conference «Young Sharks of Business», since 2007 the conference has an international status. The organizers of the conference are the International Academy of Business in cooperation with students' scientific organization «Dixi!».

Since 2001 the student council has worked in the Academy, election of council's members is made by student voting.

Since 2003 best students of IAB are annually awarded in 10 nominations at annual ceremony «Gold Snail» with encouragement of winners in form of 10—60% discount for education fee.

Students of IAB were among winners of the republican competition for the best scientific work of students on natural, technical and humanitarian sciences at the II international youth forum «Youth in Science-2010» organized by the Foundation of the First President of Republic of Kazakhstan. Students of the Academy are winners and prize-winners of international, republican, city student Olympiads.

Annually IAB organizes various competitions for students: winners among business projects developed by students of IAB within the framework of competitions "Business Safari" and "Business Incubator" are awarded, intellectual games What? Where? When? and Brain Ring are held. The Career Centre of IAB regularly organizes fairs of vacancies and presentations of the companies-partners for the purpose of employment of students of the Academy.

A student newspaper Primus inter pares is published in the Academy; in 2010 by an initiative of students IAB held the I National Forum of Student Mass-Media with support of Soros Foundation Kazakhstan.

Annually IAB organizes competition «Mister and Miss IAB», mayovkas, thematic evenings in the academy's building and clubs and other entertainment, there are KVN teams in IAB.

KVN team "Capital"

- Winners of the KIMEP Rector's Cup 2015

- Winners of the Final Regional League Cup of Azerbaijan 2015 in Baku

- Owners of an increased rating at the KiViN Festival Sochi 2015

KVN team "Friday"

- Holders of the Rector's Cup 2015

- Finalists of the League of KVN "Alma-Ata" 2016

- Finalists of the League of KVN "Alma-Ata" 2017

- Champions of the Regional League KVN "Irtysh" 2017 Pavlodar

- Participants of the Regional League KVN "Ala-TOO" 2018 Bishkek

The Sinergy Debate Club has existed since 2001.

- Winners of tournament 2014

- Winners of the KBTU 2015 Cup

- Winners of the CDU 2015 Cup

- Winners of the city tournament KazNU 2016

- Three-time finalists of the CDU 2017 Cup

- III place in the city tournament in 2017

== Material and technical basis ==
The International Academy of Business is located in a building in Almaty with a total area of 8,732.1 m^{2}, there is also a sport centre with an area of 1,024 m^{2}, a parking for 250 cars, a dining room with 190 seats. The Academy is technically ready to accept students and listeners with the limited possibilities (with infringement of the musculoskeletal system and visual system); toilets, wheelchair ramps and special lift were equipped for this purpose.

The Academy's library was created in 1996, listeners of the Almaty School of Management were its first users. In 1997 the library received a grant of Eurasia Foundation for the project «Development of library and reading room» which main purposes were equipment by technics and replenishment of library fund by the necessary literature for maintenance of educational process of the academic programs, and also providing of access to Internet. In 2001 a grant was received for the project «Formation of book fund and development of library of the International Academy of Business» with purposes of further development of book fund, improvement of given services due introduction of program «IRBIS» to library processes. Library of IAB is a member of the Information Consortium of Libraries of Kazakhstan. The library's fund consists of 203,000 books.

On December 4, 2009 solemn presentation of sport club and new sport complex of the International Academy of Business has taken place with participation of Mayor of Almaty Akhmetzhan Yessimov, known Kazakhstan sportsmen, actors, representatives of mass-media, students and employees of IAB. Opening was visited by Olympic champions Zhaksylyk Ushkempirov and Olga Shishigina, Olympic bronze winner, youth world champion Nurbakhyt Tenizbayev, the Vice-President of Football Federation of Kazakhstan Seilda Bayshakov and others.

In September 2017 Almaty Management University (AlmaU) opened the Knowledge Building - a new 'intellectual innovation' building.

== Educational programs ==
List of educational programs:

- Management
- Business Administration in the Field of Entrepreneurship
- Urban Studies and City Management
- Global Management
- Business Analytics and Economics
- Marketing
- Content, Marketing and Data Analysis (Marketing)
- Content, Marketing and Data Analysis (digital)
- Finance
- Accounting and Auditing
- Jurisprudence
- Sports Psychology
- Psychology
- International Relations and Economics
- Public Relations
- New Media
- Content, Marketing and Data Analysis (Media)
- Restaurant and Hotel Business
- Tourism and Event Management
- Logistics
- Information Systems
- Data Science
- Product Management
- Digital Film Making
- Public Health

== Awards, ratings, accreditations ==
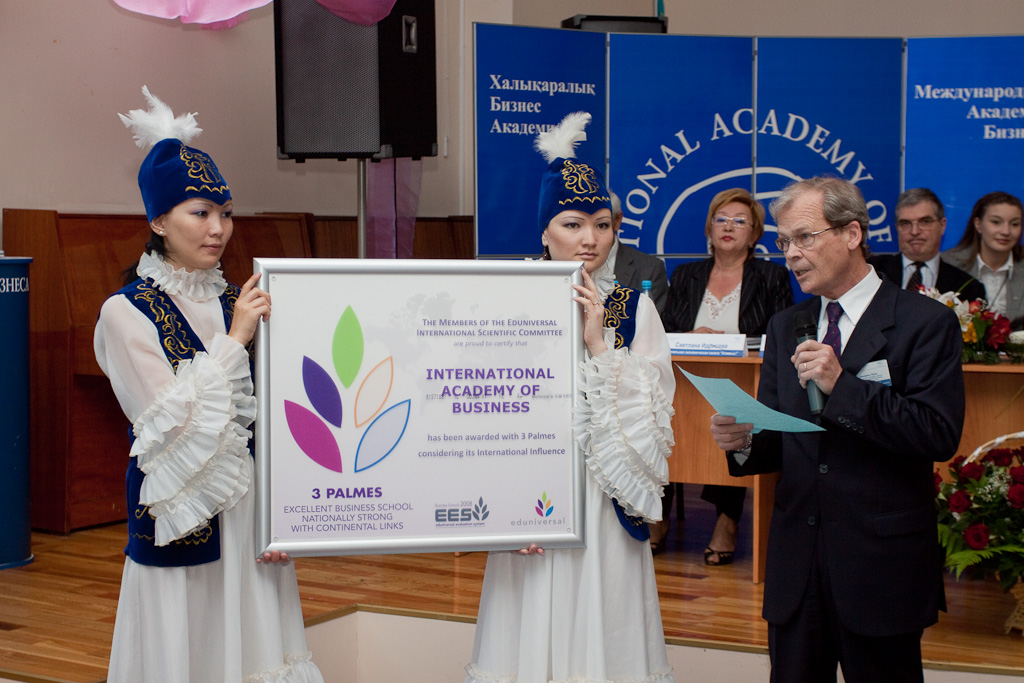
Awarding to the International Academy of Business by Eduniversal rating agency.

- In December 2009 accreditation council of the National accreditation centre of the Ministry of Education and Science of Kazakhstan decided to accredit the International Academy of Business for a period of 5 years. IAB was of the first ten high schools which have made an application and have received the state accreditation in 2009.
- In 2008-2010 IAB was admitted as business high school #1 in Kazakhstan by Eduniversal rating agency.
- In January 2010 IAB became the first high school in Kazakhstan which has received International Quality Accreditation (IQA) of the Central and East European Management Development Association (CEEMAN) for a period of 6 years in the field of quality of business education.
- By results of the competition "Senim-2010" organized by Welfare Fund "Samruk-Kazyna", IAB received 2nd degree diploma in nomination "the Best employer company in two capitals (from 50 to 250 employees)".
- In September 2010 the Academy was awarded by the people's quality symbol "Bezuprechno" (Perfect) of the National League of Consumers of Kazakhstan.
- In September 2010 the International Academy of Business signed the Magna Charta Universitatum in Bologna (Italy).
- 2012 - Kazakhstan's best employer among domestic recruiters “Senim-2011”
- 2013 - Obtained Eduniversal rating's fourth Palme, making it into the top 300 business schools of the world. In 2008 to 2011 IAB was recognised the #1 school of business in Kazakhstan by the global rating agency Eduniversal with three Palmes.
- 2013 - International accreditations - AMBA (Association of MBA's, UK) MBA AlmaU were awarded one of the most prestigious international accreditations - AMBA (International accreditation AMBA (Association of MBA's, UK)
- 2015 - National rating of the best humanitarian and economic institutions of Kazakhstan, Almaty Management University took 5th place
- 2016 - Accreditation by Association of Chartered Certified Accountants (ACCA) of Accounting and Audit Bachelor level programme is the world's most recognized qualification accreditation that is aimed at providing professional development in the area of finance.
- 2016 - The following programmes are accredited by the Independent Accreditation and Rating Agency (IAAR): "Jurisprudence", "Regional Studies", "Public relations", "Valuation", "Restaurant business and hotel business", "Logistics" (by industry), "Logistics" (by industry), "Information Systems".
- 2016 - Almaty Management University has successfully passed re-accreditation by AMBA - Association of MBA's, UK, London for the maximum period - 5 years. АМВА is one of the most prestigious accreditations in world business education. Programmes of GSB-AlmaU are the only AMBA-accredited and re-accredited in Kazakhstan and Central Asia. In the CIS region, apart from AlmaU, only 8 Russian business schools have AMBA for 5 years.
- 2017 - Awarded CEEMAN European institutional re-accreditation in quality of business education.
- 2017 - Master programmes of Almaty Management University has been ranked top-5 in Best Masters Eduniversal ranking.
- 2017 - 2 place among private universities in the institutional ranking of the Republican rating agency (the 13th place in the general rating).
- 2017 - 1st place in the reputational ranking of Kazakhstani companies in “Education” sector, 2017 (web-portal exclusive.kz and ranking agency RFCA).
- 2017 - Ranking of global business schools in Russia and CIS countries. Almaty Management University took: • the 2nd place among business schools implementing double diploma programmes with foreign universities, which have "first level" accreditation • the 4-5 place among business schools, in terms of the number of partnerships with foreign universities that have "first level" accreditation
- 2017 - The Independent Kazakh Agency for Quality Assurance in Education (IQAA) ranking. Almaty Management University took the 2nd place in the national ranking of the best humanitarian and economic universities of Kazakhstan.
- 2017 - Almaty Management University ranked third among the business schools of Central Asia according to the Eduniversal version.
- 2018 - On the 15th of May, the list of 20 best universities of Kazakhstan in 2018 was published by the Independent Agency for Accreditation and Rating (IAAR). Almaty Management University has been awarded 18th place in the institutional rating IAAR, entering the TOP-20 leading universities of Kazakhstan. Moreover, AlmaU has achieved 9th place in preparing specialists of “social sciences” and 3rd place of “public relations”.
- 2018 - On the 15th of June, National Ranking of the best Humanitarian and Economic HEIs of Kazakhstan in 2018 was published by the Independent Kazakh agency for quality assurance in education (IQAA). Almaty Management University has been awarded 3rd place in the institutional rating IQAA, collecting 82.42 points in total. The evaluation was carried out according to the following criteria: effectiveness of HEIs performance, expert evaluation, reputation among employers.
- 2018 - University was ranked as one of the top among the universities in category Top Institutions, subject area Computer Science - 12th rank, subject area Social Sciences - 14th rank.
- 2018 - In the rating of NCE RK "Atameken" and MES RK, Almaty Management University took the following places:
  - Specialty "Accounting and Audit" - 1-place;
  - Specialty "Public Relations" - 1-place;
  - Specialty "Marketing" - 5-th place;
  - Specialty "Economy" - 12-place;
  - Specialty "Finance" - 13-place;
  - Specialty "Information Systems" - 21 place. The main criteria in the ranking were such factors as the relevance of educational programs and educational literature, the novelty of the subjects taught, the level of employment and the average salary of graduates, as well as questionnaires.
- 2018 - On 21 September The Independent Kazakhstan Agency for Quality Assurance in Education (IQAA) published the winners in several categories. Almaty Management University took the 1st place in the nomination "Leader in Internationalization" and took 1st place in the nomination "Leader in promoting the university on the Internet space".

== Management ==
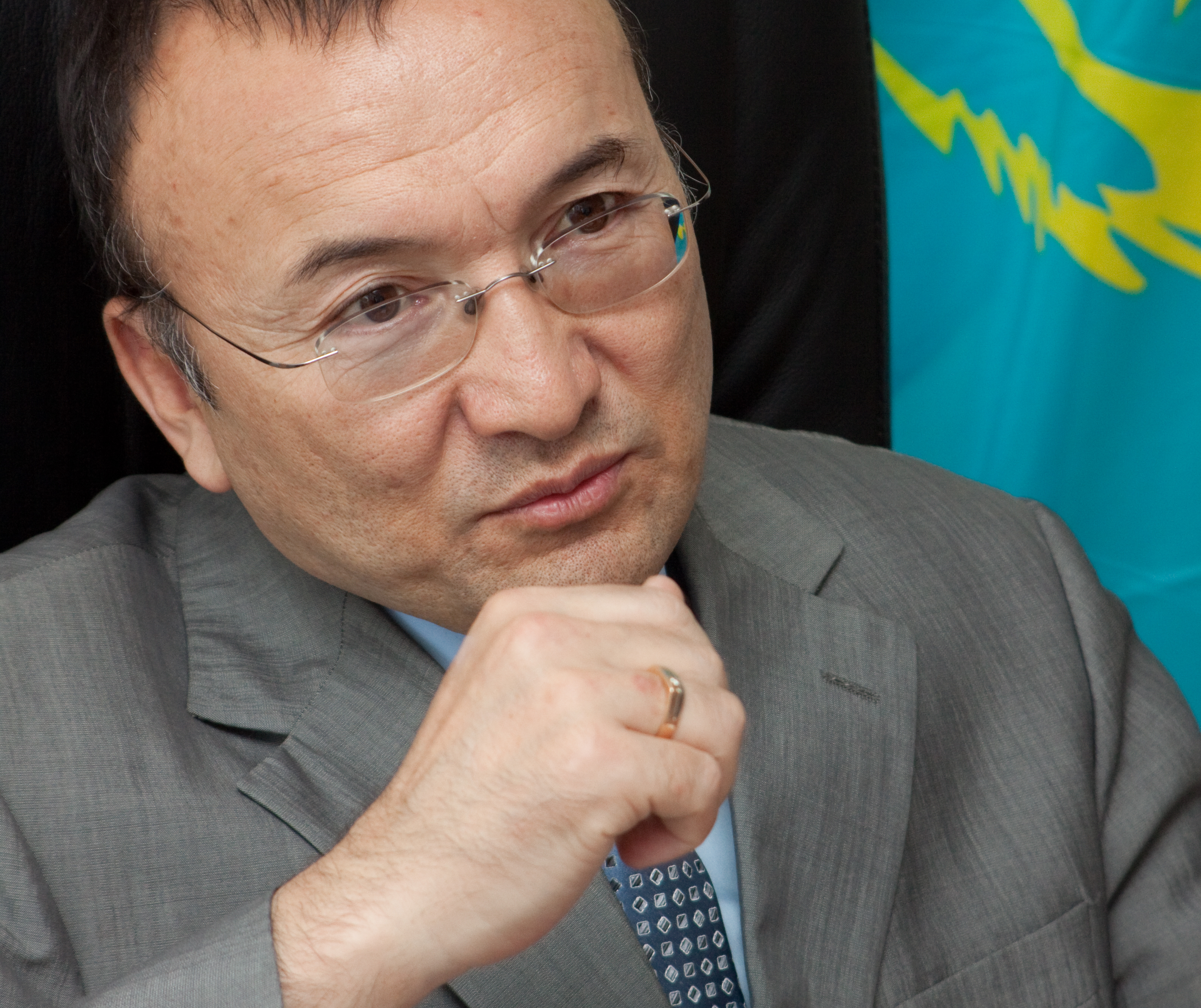
The president-rector of IAB Asylbek Kozhakhmetov.

2008-2016 Asylbek Kozhahmetov is the president-rector of the International Academy of Business. He worked as a teacher of the Alma-Ata School of Managers since January 1989, since October of the same year he worked as the Director of the School of Managers of the "Union" Republican Cooperative Association, since 1990 he was the Director of small collective enterprise «Alma-Ata School of Managers», since 1992 he was the General Director of «Almaty School of Managers» JSC, in 1998-2002 he was the President of the International Academy of Business.

Starting September 2021 rector of Almaty Management University is Gulnara Kurenkeyeva.

In December 2009 the Council of Trustees of IAB was created with the purpose of maintenance of financial and information support, assistance to strengthening of material base and a social infrastructure, working out and solution of tasks of strategic development, contribution to personal growth of staff and students of the Academy.

The chairman of the board of trustees is Zhanat Berdalina, Co-founder of an international company in the field of IT (IoT). Co-founder, Managing Partner, President of the international auditing company KPMG in Kazakhstan and Central Asia "KPMG Janat" (02.1996-05.2010),

The council also includes:

Asylbek Kozhakhmetov, President of Almaty Management University

Andrey Beklemishev, Vice President of IDC

Pekka Viljakainen, Advisor to the Chairman of the Skolkovo Foundation

Dinmukhamet Idrisov, Chairman of the Board of Ordabasy Group

Virginijus Kundrotas, President of the Baltic Management Development Association (BMDA), Dean of the Adizes Graduate School

Zhaksybek Kulekeyev, Advisor to the Chairman of the Management Board of JSC NC KazMunayGas

Dana Nurzhigitova, Deputy of the Senate of the Parliament of the Republic of Kazakhstan

Daulet Sembaev, Honorary Member of the Board of Trustees of Almaty Management University

Irina Smirnova, Deputy of the Mazhilis of the Republic of Kazakhstan

Gulnara Kurenkeyeva, Rector of Almaty Management University

Tan Chin Tiong, Senior Adviser to the President of the Singapore University of Management, Founding President of the Singapore Institute of Technology, Provost-Founder of the Singapore University of Management, Professor of Marketing at the Lee Kong Chian School of Business, Singapore University of Management

Yerkin Tatishev, Chairman of the Board of Directors, KUSTO Group

R. F. “Rick” Shangraw, Jr., President of Cintana Education

Nina Yanykina, CEO and Rector of the University 2035 National Technology Initiative

== Fellows of the academy ==
- Elizabeth Rose
