= Yerkin Tatishev =

Kazakh businessman

Yerkin Tatishev Еркин Татишев
- Born: 1 January 1976 (age 50); Kentau, South Kazakhstan region
- Education: Moscow State University of Economics, Statistics, and Informatics
- Occupation: Businessman

Yerkin Tatishev is a Kazakhstani businessman. He is the founder and chairman of the diversified industrial holding company Kusto Group, and is one of the richest businessmen in Kazakhstan with a fortune of $335 million. He was ranked 15th on the 50 Most Influential Businessmen of Kazakhstan 2022 list.

He is a shareholder of the Radisson Collection hotel (Tsinandali, Georgia), and majority shareholder of Kostanay Minerals and KazPetrolGroup oil company.

== Biography ==
Yerkin Tatishev was born in the city of Kentau of South Kazakhstan region on January 1, 1976, in a large family raised by a doctor and a teacher. His brother Yerzhan Tatishev was a Kazakhstani banker, the chairman and CEO of TuranAlem Bank later renamed as BTA Bank JSC. In 2004, at the age of 37, Yerzhan was murdered.

Yerkin Tatishev graduated from the Moscow State University of Economics, Statistics, and Informatics with a degree in Finance and Credit and the M. Narikbayev KAZGUU University with a degree in law. In 2002, he founded Kusto Group, an industrial and investment holding. From 1998 to 2004, he served as Chairman of Kostanay Minerals JSC and Orenburg Minerals JSC.

From 2004 to 2009, he held executive positions in the banking sectors of Kazakhstan and Turkey (Bank TuranAlem and Sekerbank T.A.S respectively). In 2017, Tatishev launched High Tech Academy, the first innovative school in Kazakhstan.

In May 2023, Yerkin Tatishev headed the Board of Trustees of AlmaU University. He is the Chairman of the Board of Trustees of the Yerzhan Tatishev Foundation. Since 2007 educational grants and scholarships received 264 children. Yerkin Tatishev is also a member of the Board of Trustees of the “Miloserdie” Foundation and one of the initiators of the creation of the “Kantar” Legal Support Center.

During the COVID-19 pandemic, Tatishev's Kusto Group allocated 1 billion tenge to support the population.

Co-founder and head of public association "Kazakhstan federation of kendo and Iaido"; 5th Dan Kendo holder.

== Awards ==
- In 2006 he was awarded the Honorary Order of the Republic of Georgia.
- In 2001 he was awarded Yeren Yenbek Ushin medal for his contribution to the development of science in Kazakhstan.
