= Yerzhan Tatishev =

Kazakhstani banker

- Born: April 22, 1967; Turbat, Kazygurt District, Kazakhstan
- Died: December 19, 2004 (aged 37); Jambyl Region
- Cause of death: Gunshot wound
- Education: Narxoz University
- Occupation: Banker
- Known for: Being CEO of BTA Bank and his murder by a rival businessman

Yerzhan Tatishev (Kazakh: Ержан Нұрелдайымұлы Тәтішев, Erjan Nūreldaiymūly Tätışev; 22 April 1967 – 19 December 2004) was a Kazakhstani banker who was the CEO of BTA Bank JSC. He was shot by Muratkhan Tokmadi, who later claimed that he was paid to do so by former bank chairman Mukhtar Ablyazov.

== Early years and career ==
He was born in Turbat, in the Kazygurt District in Turkistan Region of southern Kazakhstan. He graduated from the Moscow Institute of Applied Biotechnology with a degree in engineering and technology in 1991. He earned a master's degree in economics from the Kazakh State Academy of Management.

== Death ==
In December 2004, the 37-year-old Tatishev died of a gunshot wound sustained while driving in the Jambyl Region.

Kazakh businessman Muratkhan Tokmadi initially claimed to have shot him accidentally while hunting and was sentenced to one year in prison after being convicted of manslaughter. However, the case was re-opened in 2017, after he confessed in a documentary to deliberately murdering Tatishev after being paid to do so by ex-oligarch Mukhtar Ablyazov. In March 2018, Tokmadi was sentenced to ten and half years in prison.

Ablyazov, who resides in France, was already wanted in Kazakhstan, Russia, and Ukraine for alleged financial crimes. However, in 2017, a French court rejected the extradition request by the Kazakhstan government citing it to be politically motivated.
