= Vladimir Kozlov (politician) =

Kazakh journalist, politician, and human rights activist

- Владимир Козлов
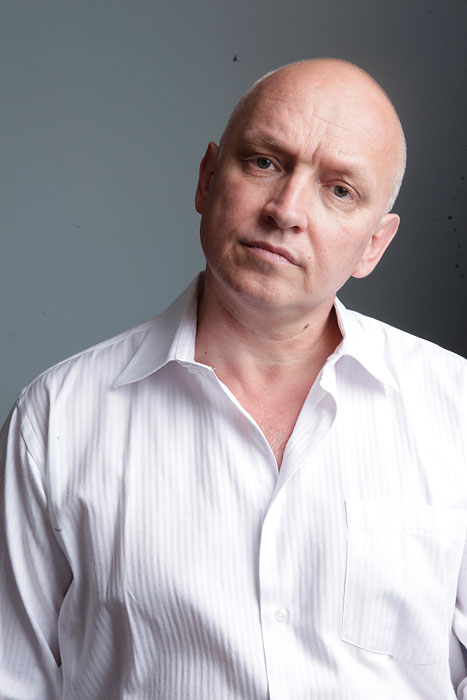
- Born: August 10, 1960 (age 65); Aktobe, Kazakh SSR, USSR
- Occupations: Journalist and politician
- Spouse: Aliya Turusbekova

Vladimir Ivanovich Kozlov (Russian and Kazakh: Владимир Иванович Козлов) is a Kazakh journalist and politician who has been a leader of the democratic opposition in Kazakhstan and a candidate for his country's presidency. In 2012, he was the defendant in what Deutsche Welle described as "the first political trial in Kazakhstan." The US charged Kazakhstan with using its criminal-justice system "to silence a leading opposition voice." Kozlov, who was found guilty and served a prison sentence, has been designated by Amnesty International as a "prisoner of conscience." He was released in 2016.

== Early life and education ==
Kozlov was born on August 10, 1960, in Aktobe.

== Media career ==
From 1990 to 1996, Kozlov worked as an editor at the TV channel AKTiVi.

From 1996 to 1998, he worked in advertising and public relations. He then served as the communications specialist for the Mangyshlak Nuclear Power Plant.

He is a co-founder of Aktau-Lada, the first private television channel in Kazakhstan.

He currently runs the internet project Kuresker.org, which focuses on the rights of civic activists and the imprisoned.

== Political career ==
He entered politics in 2001, joining the opposition party Democratic Choice of Kazakhstan. In 2003, he was elected to the party's Political Council, and later he became a member of the Presidium of the Political Council.

During a visit to Ukraine in 2004, Kozlov was struck by the effects of the Orange Revolution, which had enhanced democratic values in that country. As a result of that experience, he decided to become more politically active.

After Democratic Choice of Kazakhstan was declared illegal, Kozlov co-founded the Alga! (Forward!) Party in 2005, and has been its leader since 2007. Under his leadership, the party expanded significantly, and is now the largest opposition party in Kazakhstan, although Kazakh authorities have refused to allow it to register as an official party. Alga! has joined with the Civil Society Movement Khalyk Maidany (People's Front) in criticizing the government of Nursultan Nazarbayev. During the years 2006 to 2012, he traveled extensively in Europe, visiting various European parliaments in an effort to formulate policies to develop Kazakh civil society. In 2009, he led a campaign in Europe to deny Kazakhstan the presidency of the OSCE, arguing that the Kazakh government's human rights abuses rendered it unworthy to hold that post.

== Presidential candidacy ==
In the spring of 2011, Kozlov was a democratic opposition candidate for president of Kazakhstan, but was excluded from the April 3 election, in which Nazarbayev received 95.5% of the vote. The Office for Democratic Institutions and Human Rights rejected the election's results.

== Strike in Zhanaozen ==
In December of the same year, Kozlov and Alga! initiated an effort to supply water and tents to striking oil workers in the remote western town of Zhanaozen. The workers occupied the town's central square for seven months. Kozlov personally organized seminars for the strikers to instruct them in the ways of peaceful protest. Yet violence ensued, with police, according to eyewitnesses, firing on unarmed protesters. Over a dozen strikers (the reported number varies) were killed in Zhanaozen and nearby Shetpe, with authorities claiming that the police had been acting in self-defense. Kozlov was part of an independent public monitoring group that went to Zhanaozen in January 2012 to investigate allegations of torture and other acts of abuse of strikers in police custody. Kozlov then met with members of the European Parliament and the European Commission to discuss the crisis and report on his findings. He called for dialogue and for an international investigation into the government's handling of the strike.

== Trial and conviction ==
On January 23, 2012, after returning to Kazakhstan from his meetings with EP and EC officials, Kozlov was arrested by members of Kazakhstan's National Security Committee. His home, the Alga! party offices in Almaty, and the homes of other party members were searched.

His arrest was protested by Freedom House. He was detained for almost nine months while awaiting trial.

Polish activist and former prisoner of conscience Adam Michnik wrote a letter to Nazarbayev, dated July 30, 2012, pleading with him to release Kozlov and other activists and oil workers who had been imprisoned in the wake of events in Zhanaozen.

On August 16, he went on trial at the Mangistau Regional Court in Aktau on charges of inciting social hatred, calling to the overthrow of the constitutional order of the state, and creating and managing an organized criminal group. Kozlov said that the charges represented an effort by the government to silence the opposition.

Deutsche Welle called Kozlov's trial "the first political trial in Kazakhstan." The US State Department's 2012 Human Rights Report on Kazakhstan cited Kozlov's arrest and detention, and the confiscation of his personal property, at length as representative of that country's poor human-rights record.

He was prosecuted alongside two other opposition leaders, Akzhanat Aminov and Serik Sapargali.

The National Democratic Institute compared Kozlov's trial to a "Stalin-era political trial."

On October 8, 2012, Kozlov was found guilty, the judge ruling that Kozlov, in collusion with exiled politician Mukhtar Ablyazov, had incited oil workers in Zhanaozen to violence. Koslov was sentenced to seven years and 6 months in prison, with the other two defendants given suspended sentences of three and four years. The court also ordered that Kozlov's property be confiscated and ordered him to pay US$10,000 in court costs.

According to Amnesty International, which led off its 2013 annual report on Kazakhstan with an account of Kozlov's arrest and trial, independent monitors at the trial "reported that there was no presumption of innocence and that the evidence used against Vladimir Kozlov did not conclusively prove his guilt."

Human Rights Watch (HRW) noted on October 9, 2012, that "one of Kozlov’s lawyers and several civil society activists planning to attend the trial failed to do so because the Air Astana flight from Almaty to Aktau on which they were booked on October 8 was repeatedly delayed and only left Almaty after the trial had already begun. No other flights leaving from Almaty that day experienced such long delays due to weather or other reasons." HRW further observed that the official criminal investigation into Kozlov and his co-defendants had been "shrouded in secrecy" and that the authorities had released no "evidence of specific speech or actions by the accused that indicated the basis for the charges levied against them."

Also, "Kozlov and his lawyers were given only one day to review the approximately 700-page Russian-language indictment. The court’s translation of proceedings from Kazakh, a language Kozlov does not speak, into Russian, was poor and at times incomplete." HRW pointed out a number of examples of misconduct by the judge and prosecutors during the trial, including violations of due process and the selective use of evidence. Mihra Rittman of HRW protested that Kozlov's imprisonment "further limits a narrow political landscape in Kazakhstan and sends a chilling effect to others who might want to criticize the government and its policies."

The US Embassy in Astana issued a statement accusing Kazakhstan of using its justice system to "silence opposition voices."

Ian Kelly, US Ambassador to the OSCE, issued a statement on October 11, 2012, stating that America was "disappointed to hear of the conviction of Vladimir Kozlov" and "concerned about the apparent use of the judicial system to silence a leading opposition voice in Kazakhstan." Kelly stated that "Kazakhstan’s failure to afford Mr. Kozlov the minimum procedural guarantees required for a fair trial, in disregard of Kazakhstan’s international obligations and OSCE commitments, casts serious doubt on its respect for human rights, fundamental freedoms and the rule of law. Most importantly, the prosecution failed to produce concrete evidentiary links between Mr. Kozlov’s support for the striking oil workers and the subsequent violence that occurred in Zhanaozen. Supporting the workers’ strike should not be considered a criminal act."

Rep. Chris Smith of New Jersey, Chairman of the Commission on Security and Cooperation in Europe (U.S. Helsinki Commission), criticized the conduct of Kozlov's trial and renewed an earlier call he had made for a thorough international investigation into the events in Zhanaozen. "The trial against Mr. Kozlov and his codefendants...was unfairly conducted and appears to have had political motives," said Smith. "Both local and international observers reported that evidence was fabricated and defense witnesses were not allowed to testify. It is especially outrageous that Kozlov’s participation in the OSCE Human Dimension Implementation Meeting last year was presented as evidence against him."

In an October 18, 2012, statement, the Norwegian Helsinki Committee (NHC) said that it, too, was "disappointed" at Kozlov's sentence and suggested that it seemed "politically motivated" and that it represented "a major step backwards for political pluralism in Kazakhstan." The NHC said that the Kazakh government "has sought to place the blame for the tragedy in Zhanaozen in December 2011 on the country’s marginalised opposition," rather than on the police officers who had killed striking workers, and that the actions against Kozlov would "effectively silence one of the few remaining political forces in Kazakhstan offering robust opposition to Nazarbayev and his administration." The NHC, which had sent an observer to Kozlov's trial, further complained that prosecutors had "relied on circumstantial evidence and resorted to tactics such as calling an expert witness who testified that the opposition politician was a 'bohemian personality.'"

The Human Rights Foundation (HRF) sent a letter to Nazarbayev in December 2012 calling on him to release Kozlov, stop cracking down on independent media, and investigate allegations of torture. The HRF said that "Nazarbayev’s Kazakhstan and Lukashenko’s Belarus are the only two European states that have been denied participation in the Council of Europe because of their appalling human rights records," making them "Europe’s last dictators." HRF president Thor Halvorssen suggested that if Nazarbayev wanted to alter this status, "it’s time for him to release Mr. Kozlov and for his government to start respecting criticism from the media."

In February 2013, Tomasz Makowski and Malgorzata Marcinkiewicz, members of the Polish Parliament, were denied permission to visit Kozlov at a labor camp in the northern city of Petropavlovsk. In April 2013, the European Parliament officially condemned Kazakhstan for its violating of political, media, and religious freedoms, criticized a court ban on Alga!, and called for Kozlov's release.

A month later, a court suspended the activities of Alga! This action came in response to a request by the prosecutor's office in the city of Almaty to designate the party, along with several opposition news organizations, as "extremist."

When British Prime Minister David Cameron traveled to Kazakhstan in June 2013 to discuss economic issues, there was widespread desire for him to raise Kozlov's case. Downing Street said that Cameron would raise human-rights issues during the trip, but it was unclear if he mentioned Kozlov. Kozlov's wife, Aliya Turusbekova, said it was naïve to think Cameron would pressure Nazarbayev over such matters, given the U.K.'s view of Kazakhstan as a potential new market or source of "cheap raw materials." But she welcomed Cameron's visit in any case, saying that such international connections encouraged the Kazakh leadership "to restrain itself within certain limits so as not to look totally authoritarian and misanthropic."

Kozlov's case was scheduled to be heard by the Kazakh Supreme Court in Astana on June 24, 2013, but was then put off to July 1, 2013. On that date, it was again cancelled, this time at the last minute, purportedly because the court had not yet received the case file from Aktau. "Our authorities resemble an ostrich which has buried its head in the sand and is afraid of admitting that it is wrong," said human rights defender Galym Ageleulov about the postponement of the trial.

Moryak Sheganov, a judge on Kazakhstan's Supreme Court, refused on August 5, 2013, to review Kozlov's case, saying that "there are no grounds" for such an action. Turysbekova said that Kozlov would be appealing the decision to the UN Human Rights Commission.

== Imprisonment ==
It was reported on August 29, 2013, that according to Kozlov's wife, Aliya Turusbekova, Kozlov had health problems that were not being treated in the prison colony, EC-164/3, in which he was being held. She warned that he could have a stroke. Turusbekova said that he had severe headaches, high blood pressure, and intense pain in his right hip joint, but an application he had made for medical care had been ignored. Kozlov's physician, Bakhyt Tumenova, explained that his patient suffered from vascular disorders and required medication, and that the headaches indicated the danger of a stroke.

It was also reported that Kozlov was being heavily worked in the prison colony, doing kitchen work every day from 6 a.m. to 8 p.m., and that he had asked for a transfer to a prison colony closer to his home. A significant factor in his desire to be closer to home was that his wife was pregnant. The Open Dialog Foundation maintained that an anonymous source had informed the Respublika website "that Kazakh secret services [were] preparing a provocation against Aliya Turusbekova in order to exert pressure on her husband...to compel the politician to confess his guilt, give incriminating testimony against Mukhtar Ablyazov and publicly repent."

Kozolov was released on parole in August 2016. Three years later, he emigrated with his family to Ukraine, where he started the Kuresker.org project.
