= BTA Bank =

Bank in Kazakhstan

BTA Bank JSC
- Native name: БТА Банкі
- Type: Joint-stock company
- Industry: Financial services
- Founded: 1991; 35 years ago
- Headquarters: Almaty, Kazakhstan
- Key people: Yelena Bakhmutova (Chairman of the board of directors), Kadyrzhan Damitov (Chairman of the Management Board)
- Services: Banking services
- Net income: KZT 15.6 bln. (30 June 2013)
- Total assets: KZT 1,621 bln.
- Total equity: KZT 287.4 bln. (30 June 2013)
- Website: bta.kz, бта.қаз

BTA Bank (Kazakh: БТА; БТА Банкі; BTA Banki) (BTA Bank Joint-Stock Company in full) is a Kazakhstan bank with headquarters in Almaty. As of 2013 it was the third largest lender by assets. In 2009, BTA Bank was subject of one of the world's biggest financial frauds totaling US$5 billion.

== History ==
=== Foundations and early years ===
Old Bank Turan Alem logo

Following the dissolution of the Soviet Union in 1991, the Kazakh operations of the Soviet Promstroybank were re-organized as Turan Bank and those of the Soviet Vnesheconombank were re-organized as Alem Bank. On 15 January 1997, Turan Bank and Alem Bank merged to form Bank Turan Alem (BTA), a joint-stock company in accordance with the Decree of the Government of the Republic of Kazakhstan "On reorganization of the Kazakh joint-stock bank Turan Bank and joint-stock bank Alem Bank Kazakhstan". On 1 October 1998 Bank Turan Alem CJSC was renamed to Bank TuranAlem OJSC and then to Bank TuranAlem JSC.

In spring 2008 the bank underwent rebranding, which resulted in the change of the name, logo and corporate identity of the bank. After this the BTA Bank JSC name was no longer perceived as an acronym.

=== Events between 2009–2012 ===
==== Fraud & Embezzlement ====
It was revealed in 2009 that the bank was defrauded of up to $6 billion of cash in one of the world's biggest cases of financial fraud. The bank's former chairman Mukhtar Ablyazov is alleged to have perpetrated the fraud. Ablyazov has said that under his leadership BTA did conceal assets to protect them from being seized by the government. Private investigators have been used in an attempt to recover some of the funds, who in October 2010 found documents and disc drives relating to the bank in a self-storage facility in north London. A found documents and disc drives relating to the bank in a self-storage facility in north Londonthrough which BTA had transacted.

==== Bankruptcy ====
BTA Bank sought bankruptcy protection in 2010 from U.S. creditors while it restructured $11.6 billion of debt. The debts were incurred by alleged mismanagement and embezzlement by former BTA Bank Chairman Muktar Ablyazov.

==== Restructuring ====
In February 2009 Samruk-Kazyna Fund purchased 75.1% of BTA Bank's shares as part of contingency measures of the government of the Republic of Kazakhstan. As the result the bank gained additional capital of KZT 251.3 bln.

During 2009–2010 BTA Bank has completed restructuring of its certain financial indebtedness. As the result the bank's indebtedness decreased from $16.65 bln. to $4.2 bln, Samruk-Kazyna Fund's share in the capital increased up to 81.48%, both domestic and foreign creditors became the Bank's shareholders holding 18.5% in the capital.

Due to aggravation of the Bank's financial status during 2011, relative shortage of liquid assets and negative financial performance, in 2012 BTA Bank started the second restructuring which resulted in cancellation of the Bank's certain financial indebtedness. In consideration, the creditors received $1,618 cash and $750 mln. New Notes.

BTA Bank also entered into a revised Revocable Committed Trade Finance Facility (RCTFF) with liabilities amounting to around $348 mln. as of the restructuring date. Samruk-Kazyna Fund extended $1.592 bln. loan to BTA Bank JSC subordinated to the New Notes and RCTFF.

During the restructuring BTA Bank was recapitalized for around $10 bln. Share of Samruk-Kazyna in the Bank's equity increased up to 97.3%. Creditors' share amounted to 2.5%, share of minority shareholders, who held shares prior to 2009–2010 restructuring, amounted to 0.2% of the Bank's shares in aggregate.

=== Events after 2013 ===
After successful completion of rather difficult and scaled restructuring process BTA Bank focused on restoration of its former market positions and currently is a stable and sustainable financial institution. During the first six months of 2013 BTA Bank received KZT 15.579 bln. of net income (unaudited interim condensed consolidated IFRS statements).

In June 2013 The board of directors terminated powers of Mr. Yerik Balapanov who chaired the bank's management board since April 2012 upon his own initiative. On 5 August 2013 Mr. Kadyrzhan Damitov was appointed as the chairman of the management board of the Bank

In February 2014 it was announced that the BTA Bank and Kazkommertsbank will merge by the end of the largest bank in Central Asia. The Kazkommertsbank will take over 46.5 percent of BTA shares of the Kazakh state holding company Samruk-Kazyna, another 46.5 percent will buy the current chairman Kenes Rakischev, one of the largest private investors in Kazakhstan. The Kazkommerzbank and Rakischew will acquire its shares for each 72 billion Tenge (about 465 million US dollars). [8]

== Activities ==
BTA Bank provides a wide range of banking services to individuals, small and medium-sized enterprises, and major corporate customers. The bank's branch network includes 19 branches and over 170 outlets around Kazakhstan. International representative offices of the bank are located in Russia, Great Britain and China. BTA's banking networks are spread around Kazakhstan, Russia, Belarus, Ukraine, Kyrgyzstan, Armenia, Georgia and Turkey.

In December 2021 BTA Bank has sold 100% of "Nord Star", operator of Vitino seaport in Murmansk Oblast, to Vladimir Golubev, co-owner of "Adamant" holding.

== Shareholders and management ==
The largest shareholder of BTA Bank is Rakishev Kenes Khamituly. He owns 598,422,760,446 shares (93.28% of the placed, or 97.79% of the voting common shares). Previously 58% of the Bank's shares were held by a group of Kazakh businessmen led by Mukhtar Ablyazov, another 11% were held by the family of late Yerzhan Tatishev, minority stakes were held by European Bank for Reconstruction and Development, IFC and FMO. Yerzhan Tatishev was murdered in 2004.

Chairman of the board of directors of the bank is Yelena Bakhmutova, Deputy Chairman of the management board of Samruk-Kazyna JSC (since 15 February 2013). Since 5 August 2013, the chairman of the management board was Kadyrzhan Damitov.

On 14 February 2014, Kenes Rakishev was elected as a chairman of the board of directors.

== Structure ==
BTA has subsidiaries and representative offices in Kazakhstan, Ukraine, Russia, China, Turkey, Georgia, Belarus, Armenia.

== See also ==
- List of banks in Kazakhstan
- Mukhtar Ablyazov
