= Cour nationale du droit d'asile =

French administrative court that reviews appeals from decisions of the OFPRA

The Cour nationale du droit d'asile (formerly Commission des recours des réfugiés) is the French administrative court which was set up to review appeals from decisions of the OFPRA, granting, refusing or withdrawing refugee status (see right of asylum) and subsidiary protection.

It is located at 35, rue Cuvier 93558 Montreuil, Seine-Saint-Denis.

Article L731-1 of the Code of Entry and Residence of Foreigners and of the Right to Asylum states: "The Commission on Refugee Board is an administrative court, under the authority of a president, a member of the Council State appointed by the vice president of the Council of State. "

== History ==
The commission was created by Act No. 52–893 on July 25, 1952.

== Statistics ==
Numbers of appeal against decisions of OFPRA

- Year 2004: 51 707
- Year 2005: 38 563

The rate of annulment of the decisions of OFPRA was above 15% in 2005.

The rate is variable depending on the nationalities of the applicants. 0.51% for the Chinese, 3.70% for Moldovans, 9.68% for the Algerians, 24.68% for the Bangladeshis, 39.35% for the Albanians, and up 49.11% for Azerbaijani nationals.

== Delays ==
Before 2004, the deadline for investigating appeals could be several years. Since then, OFPRA conducted a campaign to recruit officers whose function is to reduce stocks accumulated, and requests to break down these deadlines to be 6 to 9 months
