= Life imprisonment in Mexico =

Life imprisonment in Mexico (cadena perpetua or prisión vitalicia) has a complex legal status shaped by constitutional principles emphasizing rehabilitation over permanent incarceration. While not explicitly prohibited by the Constitution of Mexico, the Mexican Supreme Court has ruled that life sentences without the possibility of parole constitute an "unusual punishment" (pena inusitada) prohibited under Article 22 of the Constitution.

== Constitutional framework ==
The Mexican Constitution contains two key provisions relevant to life imprisonment:

Article 22 prohibits the death penalty, mutilation, infamy, branding, flogging, beatings, torture, excessive fines, confiscation of property, and "any other unusual and transcendental punishments" (penas inusitadas y trascendentales). The phrase "unusual punishments" was likely derived from the Eighth Amendment of the United States Constitution, which prohibits "cruel and unusual punishment."

Article 18 establishes that the prison system shall be organized on the basis of respect for human rights, with work, training, education, health, and sports serving as means to achieve inmates' social integration, with the goal that offenders will not commit crimes again. This rehabilitation-focused philosophy has been central to judicial interpretations of life sentences.

== October 2001 Supreme Court ruling ==
In October 2001, the Mexican Supreme Court issued a landmark ruling (Tesis P./J. 125/2001 and P./J. 127/2001) holding that life imprisonment constitutes an "unusual punishment" prohibited by Article 22 of the Constitution. The court reasoned that a life sentence would be contrary to the Constitution's spirit of rehabilitation, as Justice Román Palacios wrote in a 6–2 opinion: "It would be absurd to hope to rehabilitate the criminal if there were no chance of his returning to society."

The ruling established that all persons sentenced to life imprisonment or lengthy prison terms (such as 300 years) must become eligible for parole. Because the decision was based on constitutional interpretation, it could not be overturned by the President of Mexico or the Mexican Congress.

=== Maximum sentences ===
Under Mexican law, the standard maximum prison sentence is 60 years, though this can vary:

- Offenders demonstrating good behavior may become eligible for parole after 40 years
- Standard parole eligibility occurs after 50 years
- In certain cases involving organized crime or special circumstances, parole eligibility may be extended to 60 years

== Impact on extradition ==
The 2001 ruling had significant implications for extradition between Mexico and the United States. Following the decision, Mexico refused to extradite fugitives who faced potential life sentences in the United States unless U.S. authorities provided assurances that life imprisonment would not be imposed.

=== Notable cases ===
Several high-profile extradition cases were affected:

- Augustin Vasquez: In January 2002, a Mexican court invoked the Supreme Court ruling to bar the extradition of Vasquez, charged with the 1994 murder of U.S. Drug Enforcement Administration agent Richard Fass in Arizona. Mexican authorities stated Vasquez would not be extradited unless Arizona guaranteed a sentence of 60 years or less.
- Mario Villanueva: The former governor of Quintana Roo (1993–1999), indicted by a U.S. federal grand jury on drug trafficking charges carrying potential life sentences, had his extradition blocked following the ruling.
- Joaquín "El Chapo" Guzmán: The Sinaloa Cartel leader was extradited to the United States in 2017 only after Mexico received assurances he would not face the death penalty. He was subsequently sentenced to life imprisonment plus 30 years.

=== Diplomatic tensions ===
The extradition restrictions created significant tension between Mexico and the United States, as hundreds of fugitives were able to avoid extradition. In response, the United States Congress enacted Section 583 of the State Department Appropriations Bill (P.L. 109-102), which prohibited certain financial assistance to countries refusing to extradite individuals facing life imprisonment without parole.

== 2005 reversal ==
In late November 2005, the Mexican Supreme Court partially reversed its 2001 position, ruling that extradition could proceed in life sentence cases if there was a possibility of parole in the requesting country. This decision allowed extradition to U.S. states that offered parole possibilities, though it still barred extradition to jurisdictions with life imprisonment without the possibility of parole.

The reversal facilitated a significant increase in extraditions to the United States. During the administration of Felipe Calderón (2006–2012), Mexico extradited 587 individuals to the United States, nearly triple the 218 extradited in the eleven years prior (1995–2005).

== Current status ==
Mexico continues to refuse extradition of any person who may face capital punishment in the requesting country, regardless of citizenship. For life imprisonment cases, Mexico generally requires assurances that parole will be available before approving extradition.

== Comparison with other countries ==
Mexico's approach to life imprisonment reflects broader trends in Latin America, where many countries impose statutory maximum sentences rather than life without parole. Most Latin American countries have maximum sentences ranging from 25 to 75 years rather than true life imprisonment.

== See also ==
- Law of Mexico
- Capital punishment in Mexico
- Constitution of Mexico
- Extradition law in the United States
- Mexico–United States relations
