= Mexican labor law =

Mexican labor law governs the process by which workers in Mexico may organize labor unions, engage in collective bargaining, and strike. Current labor law reflects the historic interrelation between the state and the Confederation of Mexican Workers, the labor confederation officially aligned with the Institutional Revolutionary Party (the Institutional Revolutionary Party, or PRI), which ruled Mexico under various names for more than seventy years.

While the law, at face value, promises workers the right to strike and to organize, in practice it makes it difficult or impossible for independent unions to organize while condoning the corrupt practices of many existing unions and the employers with which they deal.

== History of Mexican labor law ==
The current system originated in the Mexican Revolution of 1910–1920, which produced the Constitution of 1917. Article 123 of that Constitution gave workers the right to organize labor unions and to strike. It also provided protection for women and children, the eight-hour day, and a living wage

The Constitution's promised rights, however, remained mere promises until 1931, when the government enacted the Ley Federal de Trabajo or Federal Labor Law. The LFT established Juntas de Conciliación y Arbitraje (the Boards of Conciliation and Arbitration), made up of representatives of the government, employers and labor unions.

== Organizing, elections and strikes ==
In order to participate in this system, a union must have a legal registration (registro), must have an officially recognized right to negotiate collective bargaining agreements (titularidad), and must periodically re-register its officers and be accepted by the state (toma de nota). This system can be used to hobble independent unions not associated with the CTM or other federations that have established relations with the state, since all three members of these boards often have self-interested reasons for denying or delaying registration to rival unions.

Employers can also avoid unionization by entering into "protection contracts" with "sindicatos blancos" or "white unions", often before a plant is ever built. Such contracts frequently give the union a closed shop, which authorizes the union to demand that the employer fire a worker who is not a member in the union in good standing; that power can, in turn, be used to single out employees who seek to organize independent unions for termination. Some observers, including the independent Unión Nacional de Trabajadores (http://www.unt.org.mx) or UNT, estimate that between eighty and ninety percent of all collective bargaining agreements in Mexico fall into this category.

Employees are not always aware that they are covered by a protection contract or that they are represented by a union; while the ghost union may have registered with the Board and filed its contract with it, those records are not made public. An outside union that has filed a petition seeking to organize workers may have its petition dismissed if it is unaware that another union is already recognized or if it does not list the correct name or legal address of the incumbent union.

If an outside union challenging a recognized union is able to obtain registration, then it must go through an election to oust the incumbent. Local Boards often delay such elections for long periods; when they do take place they are by voice vote, rather than secret ballot, in elections held in the workplace under the supervision of a representative of the labour board, the employer, the official union and the independent union. In recent contested elections workers have been required to pass through a gauntlet of armed representatives of the incumbent union in order to report for work and to vote in their workplace. Even if the independent union wins the election, the original contract remains in place until its expiration.

While Mexican labor law gives workers powerful rights to strike, barring employers from hiring replacement workers or operating during a strike, those rights are dependent on official approval from the Board. These local Boards frequently declare strikes to be "inexistente" or non-existent, depriving striking workers of all their legal protections. As a result, while labour protests and work stoppages are frequent in Mexico, legal strikes are rare.

== Proposals for change ==
The PRI and Mexican employers' associations started floating proposals to enhance productivity of Mexican industry by allowing it more "flexibility" during the late 1980s, when "technocrats" such as Miguel de la Madrid, Carlos Salinas de Gortari and Ernesto Zedillo were in command of the PRI. Those proposals made no headway, however, until after the election of Vicente Fox Quesada of the Partido Acción Nacional, or PAN, in 2000. Fox's Secretary of Labor, Carlos Abascal Carranza, a former head of one of the largest employer associations, initiated discussions in 2001 with employer associations and the official and independent union confederations aimed at achieving a consensus proposal for labor law reform.

The Abascal proposal presented in 2002, however, would tighten government control of unions and collective bargaining, without taking any steps to make information about unions' collective bargaining agreements or their activities available to affected workers or the public or make the organizing process any less cumbersome. On the contrary, the proposed reforms would heighten the risks for workers seeking to organize by requiring independent unions to submit the name and address of each of their members to the local Boards, which would then have the power to investigate the authenticity of their signatures.

The reforms would also favor existing unions by barring the board from considering more than one election petition at a time and tightening jurisdictional rules defining which labor organization can represent which workers, according to their craft, enterprise and company, making it impossible for some independent unions to challenge incumbents.

Opponents of the law have challenged it under the provisions of the labor side letter to the North American Free Trade Agreement (NAFTA). While the CTM originally supported the reforms, some unions within the official labor movement have expressed reservations about it. The proposals are currently at a standstill.

== See also ==
- Economic history of Mexico#Labor unions
- Law of Mexico
- Charro (Mexican politics)
- Mexico Pension Plan
- Oportunidades
