= Administrative law =

Branch of law governing administrative agencies

Administrative law is a division of law governing the activities of executive branch agencies of government. Administrative law includes executive branch rulemaking (executive branch rules are generally referred to as "regulations"), adjudication, and the enforcement of laws. Administrative law is considered a branch of public law.

Administrative law deals with the decision-making of administrative units of government that are part of the executive branch in such areas as international trade, manufacturing, the environment, taxation, broadcasting, immigration, and transport.

Administrative law expanded greatly during the 20th century, as legislative bodies worldwide created more government agencies to regulate the social, economic and political spheres of human interaction.

Civil law countries often have specialized administrative courts that review these decisions.

In the last fifty years, administrative law, in many countries of the civil law tradition, has opened itself to the influence of rules posed by supranational legal orders, in which judicial principles have strong importance: it has led, for one, to changes in some traditional concepts of the administrative law model, as has happened with the public procurements or with judicial control of administrative activity and, for another, has built a supranational or international public administration, as in the environmental sector or with reference to education, for which, within the United Nations' system, it has been possible to assist to a further increase of administrative structure devoted to coordinate the States' activity in that sector.

== In civil law countries ==
Unlike most common law jurisdictions, most civil law jurisdictions have specialized courts or sections to deal with administrative cases that as a rule apply procedural rules that are specifically designed for such cases and distinct from those applied in private law proceedings, such as contract or tort claims.

=== Brazil ===
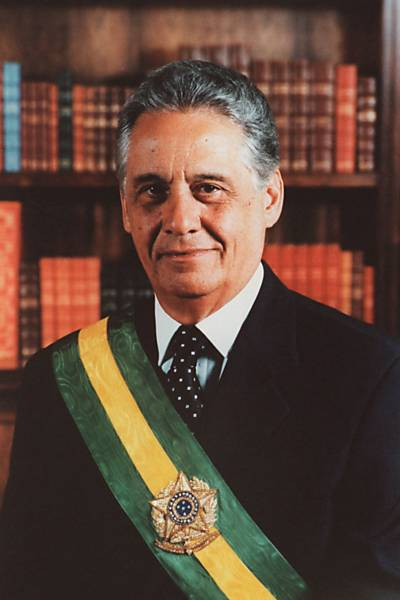
President Fernando Henrique Cardoso in 1999

In Brazil, administrative cases are typically heard either by the Federal Courts (in matters concerning the Federal Union) or by the Public Treasury divisions of State Courts (in matters concerning the States). In 1998 a constitutional reform led by the government of President Fernando Henrique Cardoso introduced regulatory agencies as a part of the executive branch. Since 1988, Brazilian administrative law has been strongly influenced by the judicial interpretations of the constitutional principles of public administration (Art. 37 of the Federal Constitution): legality, impersonality, publicity of administrative acts, morality and efficiency.

=== Chile ===
In Chile, the President of the Republic exercises the administrative function, in collaboration with several ministries or other authorities with ministerial rank. Each ministry has one or more under-secretaries that act through public service to meet public needs. There is no single specialized court to deal with actions against the administrative entities, but there are several specialized courts and procedures of review.

=== China ===
Administrative law in China was virtually non-existent in its modern sense before the economic reform era initiated by Deng Xiaoping. Since the 1980s China has constructed a new legal framework for administrative law, establishing control mechanisms for overseeing the bureaucracy, and disciplinary committees for the Chinese Communist Party.

In 1989, China established its Administrative Litigation Law, which provides an avenue for people to challenge government action. In 2014, it was amended to lower the burdens on those challenging administrative actions.

In 1990, the Administrative Supervision Regulations (行政检查条例) and the Administrative Reconsideration Regulations (行政复议条例) were passed. The 1993 State Civil Servant Provisional Regulations (国家公务员暂行条例) changed the way government officials were selected and promoted, requiring that they pass exams and yearly appraisals, and introducing a rotation system. The three regulations have been amended and upgraded into laws. In 1994, the State Compensation Law (国家赔偿法) was passed, followed by the Administrative Penalties Law (行政处罚法) in 1996. Administrative Compulsory Law was enforced in 2012. The General Administrative Procedure Law is underway.

=== France ===
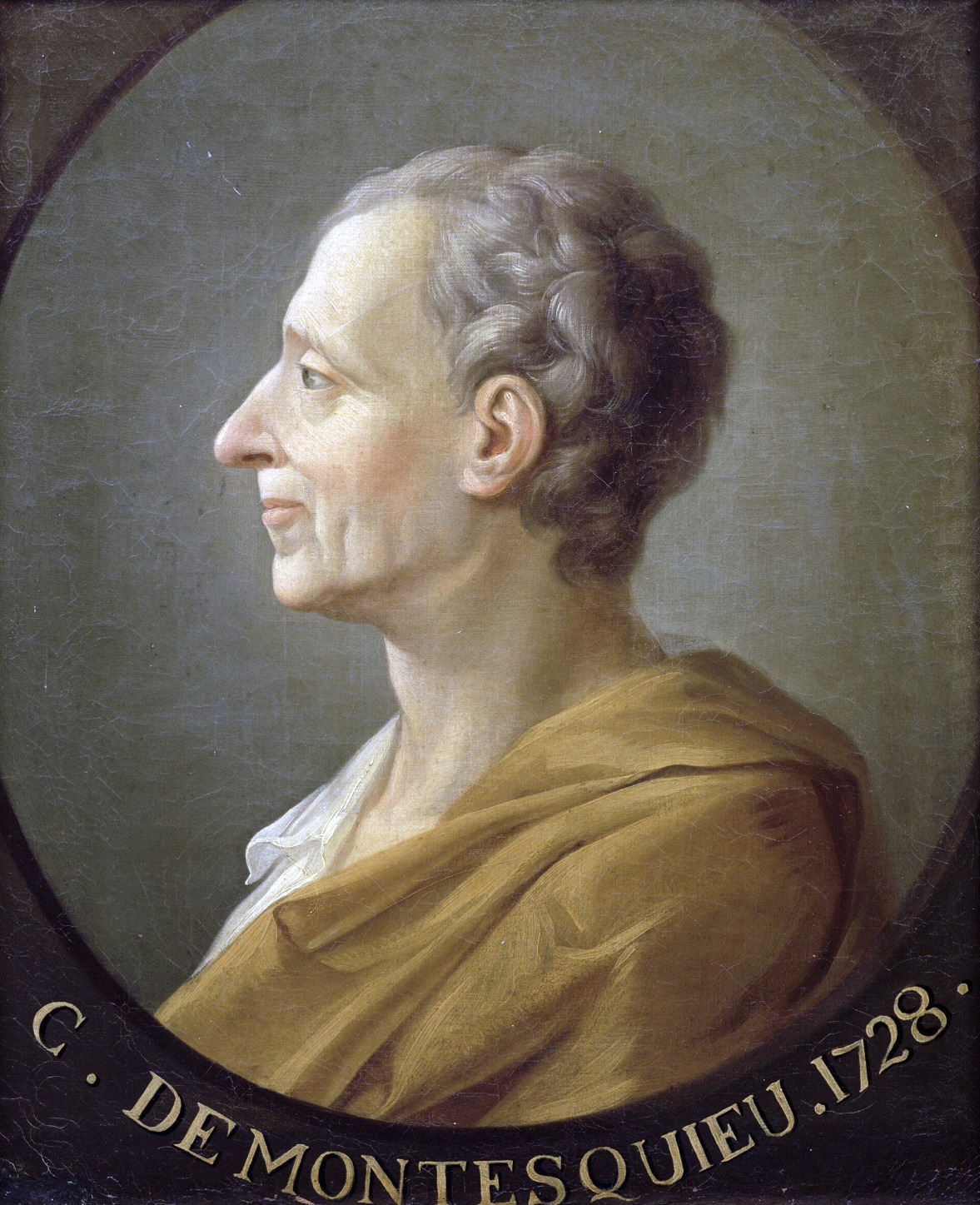
The French Enlightenment political philosopher Montesquieu

In France, there is a dual jurisdictional system with the judiciary branch responsible for civil law and criminal law, and the administrative branch having jurisdiction when a government institution is involved.

Most claims against the national or local governments as well as claims against private bodies providing public services are handled by administrative courts, which use the Conseil d'État (Council of State) as a court of last resort for both ordinary and special courts. The main administrative courts are the tribunaux administratifs and appeal courts are the cours administratives d'appel. Special administrative courts include the National Court of Asylum Right as well as military, medical and judicial disciplinary bodies. The French body of administrative law is called "droit administratif".

Over the course of their history, France's administrative courts have developed an extensive and coherent case law (jurisprudence constante) and legal doctrine (principes généraux du droit and principes fondamentaux reconnus par les lois de la République), often before similar concepts were enshrined in constitutional and legal texts. These principes include:

- Right to fair trial (droit à la défense), including for internal disciplinary bodies
- Right to challenge any administrative decision before an administrative court (droit au recours)
- Equal treatment of public service users (égalité devant le service public)
- Equal access to government employment (égalité d'accès à la fonction publique) without regard for political opinions
- Freedom of association (liberté d'association)
- Right to entrepreneurship (Liberté du Commerce et de l'industrie, lit. freedom of commerce and industry)
- Right to legal certainty (Droit à la sécurité juridique)

French administrative law, the basis of continental administrative law, has had a strong influence on administrative laws in several other countries such as Belgium, Greece, Turkey and Tunisia.

=== Germany ===
In Germany, administrative law (German: Verwaltungsrecht) includes all law that specifically governs the legal relationships between public authorities and private persons, and that is not more precisely described as constitutional law. It sets out the tasks, aims and powers, as well as the organization and procedure, for all public authorities (German: Behörden). As a field of legal study, administrative law has been differentiated from other branches of public law since the late 19th century in Germany; the precise delimitations of "administration" as a concept, however, are in contention. Administrative law defines all aspects of public administration in the modern German state, whose legal culture emphasizes private persons' subjective rights (also, pursuant to art. 19_{IV} of the current German Constitution of 1949, such rights must be fully justiciable). The final say on the interpretation of the law lies with the courts of administrative jurisdiction (German: Verwaltungsgerichte), and the law usually permits close judicial scrutiny of public authorities' exercise of discretion.

==== Constitutional context ====
Central legal principles of the Rechtsstaat (rule of law) that pervade administration ‒ mostly developed before the adoption of the modern 1949 Constitution, but strengthened and expanded after its advent by their new conceptual foundation ‒ include:

- The principle of the lawfulness of the executive (Gesetzmäßigkeit der Verwaltung): administrative authorities are bound to act where a law (of parliament, or of delegated legislation) prescribes it, and to not violate any laws (artt. 1_{III} and 20_{III} of the Constitution). Where its actions may burden or comparatively disadvantage a person, they must rest on a grant of authority by the legislature: this concept is called the (grundrechtliche) Vorbehalt des Gesetzes or Eingriffsvorbehalt, meaning that limiting interference with (fundamental) rights is a sphere of action that is reserved to statute.
- The principle of legal security, which includes a principle of legal certainty and the principle of non-retroactivity.
- The principle of proportionality, which means that an act of an authority has to be suitable, necessary and appropriate.

The vast majority of public administration in Germany is performed by its component federal entities (German: (Bundes-)Länder), which are responsible for the execution both of federal laws and their own laws (execution of the laws directly by authorities of the Federal Republic being the exceptional case, as established by artt. 83 et seqq. of the Constitution).

==== Scope of administrative law ====
German legal scholarship does not have an agreed-upon definition for public administration.

In one sense, administration – more precisely, everything that is subject to administrative law – is conceptualized as being all state activity of a certain type (material definition of public administration). This approach leads to disputes about whether to treat acts of public authority as acts of administration (and therefore executive) even when they are performed by component parts of the state (that is to say, the government) that the law formally classifies as a legislative or a judicial body: For instance, the parliament may impose a fine on one of its members for misbehavior, or a presiding judge may direct a disruptive member of the public to be removed from the viewing gallery.

The opposite approach – the formalist definition of public administration – begins its examination by considering all those public authorities intended (judging by their lawful charter, organizational context, internal structure, and performed tasks) to do the work of public administration, and equates their functioning with public administration. There is some danger of circular reasoning, since the formal categorization of the organizational unit may, in turn, derive from some material conception of its function. Some functions that might, in the material view, be seen as not of the executive type, and thus not as belonging to the field of administration (such as the creation of rules with the force of law, which are usually thought of as legislative), would then be held to the standards of administrative law, and not another field of law.

This discussion is of seen as being of particular importance when considering the role of administrative law in maintaining the division of government powers. For this purpose, a traditional approach tries negatively to define administration by subtracting those operations of the state which cannot be called administration, namely law-making and adjudication. Using this negative definition, though, requires law-making and adjudication to be defined first, and leaves some activities that are a poor fit for the term "administration", such as the cabinet government's political leadership decisions, within the bounds of the definition.

Positive definitions abound, but none has won out over the others, or been entirely convincing to scholars of German administrative law. Nevertheless, certain features may be seen as being characteristic of administration: According to Maurer and Waldhoff, administration is social engineering (exerting influence on the non-state, societal domain) (1), oriented towards some conception of the (ever-changing) public interest (2), that consists of taking action in the present, with a view to engineering the future (3), and that comprises concrete measures to regulate individual cases and to realize particular plans (4).

Scholarly treatises of German administrative law are almost always split into two parts: doctrines and rules that can be found across-the-board (allgemeines Verwaltungsrecht); and doctrines and rules that exist only in certain parts of administrative law (German: besonderes Verwaltungsrecht, lit. 'special administrative law') – e.g. police law, urban planning law, or local government law.

==== General administrative law ====
Germany's principal piece of legislation concerning the legal forms and principles common to most fields (Note: With regard to the law of social safety nets and welfare (German: Sozialrecht), the VwVfG is supplanted by Volume X of the Social Law Code (German: Zehntes Buch Sozialgesetzbuch, abbreviated SGB X), and other general rules for administration in this area may be found in parts of Volume I and IV; the Revenue Code (German: Abgabenordnung, abbreviated AO) also supersedes the VwVfG with respect to the procedures of the tax authorities.) of its public administration is the Law on Administrative Procedure (German: Verwaltungsverfahrensgesetz, abbreviated ); before the enactment of this law in 1977, these rules had only been general principles developed in the scholarly literature and the courts. The is not a full codification of the generally applicable ground rules of German administrative law, since it mostly only determines the procedure to be followed by public authorities in the fulfillment of their tasks, rather than mandating the substance of public administration. The VwVfG is a federal law that only applies to administration carried out by the German federal authorities. All 16 German Länder have, however, enacted a Law on Administrative Procedure of their own that is nearly word-for-word identical with the federal VwVfG.

The standard form of administrative is the Verwaltungsakt (administrative ordinance). Pursuant to VwVfG § 35, an administrative ordinance exists where: a public authority (1) issues any decree, decision, or other official measure (2), in a matter of public law (3), with immediate legal effects outside the administration (4), to put in place a rule for an individual case (5).

==== Specialized administrative law ====
German legal scholarship traditionally organizes the body of German administration-related law into the following fields, each with its particular legal doctrines and written rules:

- the law governing preventative measures against hazards to common goods (or, if civil process cannot be timely availed to remedy the hazard, against individual goods), especially public safety and order (German: Polizeirecht, lit. 'Police law' or German: Gefahrenabwehrrecht, lit. 'Defense against hazards law');
- environmental protection law (German: Umweltschutzrecht, including protection against emissions (German: Immisionsschutz) and wildlife protection (German: Naturschutz));
- Urban and land use planning law (Städtebaurecht and Raumordnungsrecht);
- the law regulating commerce and trades (German: Gewerberecht).

==== Judicial application ====
The law governing the adjudication of questions of administrative law before the courts of general administrative jurisdiction (German: Verwaltungsgerichte) is the Code on Administrative Courts (German: Verwaltungsgerichtsordnung, abbreviated VwGO), which was enacted in 1960. Though the VwGO was not conceived as a full codification of court process for the courts of general administrative jurisdiction, and VwGO § 173 directs these courts to apply Germany's Code of Civil Procedure wherever the VwGO lacks special rules, proceedings before the courts of general administrative jurisdiction are mostly distinct from civil proceedings before the courts of general jurisdiction. The VwGO also does not apply to the courts of special administrative jurisdiction over tax disputes (German: Finanzgerichte) or over social benefits disputes (German: Sozialgerichte).

=== Italy ===
In Italy, administrative law is known as Diritto amministrativo, a branch of public law whose rules govern the organization of the public administration and the activities of the pursuit of the public interest of the public administration and the relationship between this and the citizens. Its genesis is related to the principle of division of powers of the State. The administrative power, originally called "executive", is to organize resources and people whose function is devolved to achieve the public interest objectives as defined by the law.

=== Netherlands ===
In the Netherlands administrative law provisions are usually contained in the various laws about public services and regulations. There is however also a single General Administrative Law Act (Algemene wet bestuursrecht or Awb), which is a rather good sample of procedural laws in Europe. It applies both to the making of administrative decisions and the judicial review of these decisions in courts. Another act about judicial procedures in general is the Algemene termijnenwet (General time provisions act), with general provisions about time schedules in procedures.

On the basis of the Awb, citizens can oppose a decision (besluit) made by an administrative agency (bestuursorgaan) within the administration and apply for judicial review in courts if unsuccessful. Before going to court, citizens must usually first object to the decision with the administrative body that made it. This is called bezwaar. This procedure allows for the administrative body to correct possible mistakes themselves and is used to filter cases before going to court. Sometimes, instead of bezwaar, a different system is used called administratief beroep (administrative appeal). The difference with bezwaar is that administratief beroep is filed with a different administrative body, usually a higher ranking one, than the administrative body that made the primary decision. Administratief beroep is available only if the law on which the primary decision is based specifically provides for it. An example involves objecting to a traffic ticket with the district attorney (officier van justitie), after which the decision can be appealed in court.

Unlike France or Germany, there are no special administrative courts of first instance in the Netherlands, but regular courts have an administrative "chamber" which specializes in administrative appeals. The courts of appeal in administrative cases however are specialized depending on the case, (for instance the Central Appeals Tribunal for social security or Trade and Industry Appeals Tribunal for social-economic administrative law.) but most administrative appeals end up in the judicial section of the Council of State (Raad van State).

=== Sweden ===
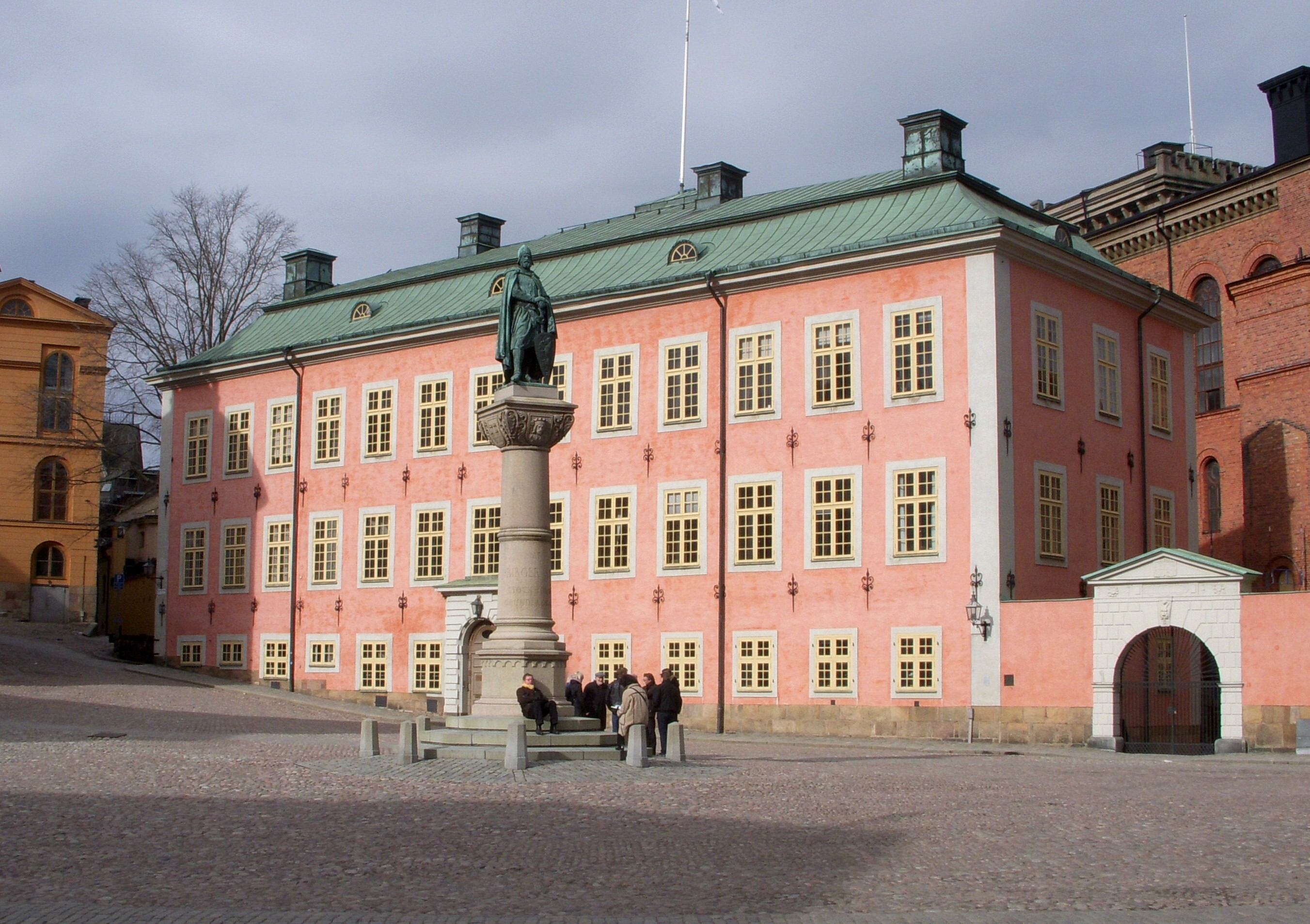
The Stenbockska Palace is the former seat of the Supreme Administrative Court of Sweden.

In Sweden, there is a system of administrative courts that considers only administrative law cases and is completely separate from the system of general courts. This system has three tiers, with 12 county administrative courts (förvaltningsrätt) as the first tier, four administrative courts of appeal (kammarrätt) as the second tier, and the Supreme Administrative Court of Sweden (Högsta Förvaltningsdomstolen) as the third tier.

Migration cases are handled in a two-tier system, effectively within the system of general administrative courts. Three of the administrative courts serve as migration courts (migrationsdomstol) with the Administrative Court of Appeal in Stockholm serving as the Migration Court of Appeal (Migrationsöverdomstolen), from which appeals may go to the Högsta Förvaltningsdomstolen.

=== Taiwan (ROC) ===
In Taiwan the recently enacted Constitutional Procedure Act (憲法訴訟法) in 2019 (former Constitutional Interpretation Procedure Act, 1993), the Justices of the Constitutional Court of Judicial Yuan of Taiwan is in charge of judicial interpretation. As of 2019, this council has made 757 interpretations.

=== Turkey ===
In Turkey, the lawsuits against the acts and actions of the national or local governments and public bodies are handled by administrative courts which are the main administrative courts. The decisions of the administrative courts are checked by the Regional Administrative Courts and Council of State. Council of State as a court of last resort is exactly similar to Conseil d'État in France.

=== Ukraine ===
Administrative law in Ukraine is a homogeneous legal substance isolated in a system of jurisprudence characterized as: (1) a branch of law; (2) a science; (3) a discipline.

== In common law countries ==
Generally speaking, most countries that follow the principles of common law have developed procedures for judicial review that limit the reviewability of decisions made by administrative law bodies. Often these procedures are coupled with legislation or other common law doctrines that establish standards for proper rulemaking. Administrative law may also apply to the review of decisions of so-called semi-public bodies, such as non-profit corporations, disciplinary boards, and other decision-making bodies that affect the legal rights of members of a particular group or entity.

While administrative decision-making bodies are often controlled by larger governmental units, their decisions could be reviewed by a court of general jurisdiction under some principle of judicial review based upon due process (United States) or fundamental justice (Canada). Judicial review of administrative decisions is different from an administrative appeal. When sitting in review of a decision, the Court will only look at the method in which the decision was arrived at, whereas in an administrative appeal, the correctness of the decision itself will be examined, usually by a higher body in the agency. This difference is vital in appreciating administrative law in common law countries.

The scope of judicial review may be limited to certain questions of fairness, or whether the administrative action is ultra vires. In terms of ultra vires actions in the broad sense, a reviewing court may set aside an administrative decision if it is unreasonable (under Canadian law, following the rejection of the "Patently Unreasonable" standard by the Supreme Court in Dunsmuir v New Brunswick), Wednesbury unreasonable (under British law), or arbitrary and capricious (under U.S. Administrative Procedure Act and New York State law). Administrative law, as laid down by the Supreme Court of India, has also recognized two more grounds of judicial review which were recognized but not applied by English Courts, namely legitimate expectation and proportionality.

The powers to review administrative decisions are usually established by statute but were originally developed from the royal prerogative writs of English law, such as the writ of mandamus and the writ of certiorari. In certain common law jurisdictions, such as India or Pakistan, the power to pass such writs is a Constitutionally guaranteed power. This power is seen as fundamental to the power of judicial review and an aspect of the independent judiciary.

=== United States ===
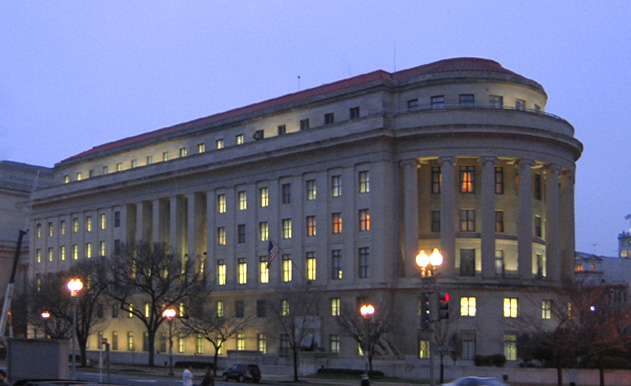
American administrative law often involves the regulatory activities of so-called "independent agencies", such as the Federal Trade Commission, whose headquarters is shown above.

In the United States, many government agencies are organized under the executive branch of government, although a few are part of the judicial or legislative branches.

In the federal government, the executive branch, led by the president, controls the federal executive departments, which are led by secretaries who are members of the United States Cabinet. The many independent agencies of the United States government created by statutes enacted by Congress exist outside of the federal executive departments but are still part of the executive branch.

Congress has also created some special judicial bodies known as Article I tribunals to handle some areas of administrative law.

The actions of executive agencies and independent agencies are the main focus of American administrative law. In response to the rapid creation of new independent agencies in the early twentieth century (see discussion below), Congress enacted the Administrative Procedure Act (APA) in 1946. Many of the independent agencies operate as miniature versions of the tripartite federal government, with the authority to "legislate" (through rulemaking; see Federal Register and Code of Federal Regulations), "adjudicate" (through administrative hearings), and to "execute" administrative goals (through agency enforcement personnel). Because the United States Constitution sets no limits on this tripartite authority of administrative agencies, Congress enacted the APA to establish fair administrative law procedures to comply with the constitutional requirements of due process. Agency procedures are drawn from four sources of authority: the APA, organic statutes, agency rules, and informal agency practice. Agencies can only act within their congressionally delegated authority, and must comply with the requirements of the APA.

At the state level, the first version of the Model State Administrative Procedure Act was promulgated and published in 1946 by the Uniform Law Commission (ULC), in which year the Federal Administrative Procedure Act was drafted. It incorporates basic principles with only enough elaboration of detail to support essential features, therefore it is a "model", and not a "uniform", act. A model act is needed because state administrative law in the states is not uniform, and there are a variety of approaches used in the various states. Later it was modified in 1961 and 1981. The present version is the 2010 Model State Administrative Procedure Act (MSAPA) which maintains the continuity with earlier ones. The reason for the revision is that, in the past two decades state legislatures, dissatisfied with agency rule-making and adjudication, have enacted statutes that modify administrative adjudication and rule-making procedure.

The American Bar Association's official journal concerning administrative law is the Administrative Law Review, a quarterly publication that is managed and edited by students at the Washington College of Law.

==== Historical development ====
Stephen Breyer, a U.S. Supreme Court Justice from 1994 to 2022, divides the history of administrative law in the United States into six discrete periods, in his book, Administrative Law & Regulatory Policy (3d Ed., 1992):

- English antecedents & the American experience to 1875
- 1875 – 1930: the rise of regulation & the traditional model of administrative law
- 1930 – 1945: the New Deal
- 1945 – 1965: the Administrative Procedure Act & the maturation of the traditional model of administrative law
- 1965 – 1985: critique and transformation of the administrative process
- 1985 – ?: retreat or consolidation

==== Agriculture ====
The agricultural sector is one of the most heavily regulated sectors in the U.S. economy, as it is regulated in various ways at the international, federal, state, and local levels. Consequently, administrative law is a significant component of the discipline of agricultural law. The United States Department of Agriculture and its myriad agencies such as the Agricultural Marketing Service are the primary sources of regulatory activity, although other administrative bodies such as the Environmental Protection Agency play a significant regulatory role as well.

== See also ==
- Immigration lawyer
- Constitutionalism
- Rule of law
- Rechtsstaat
