= Sociedad Financiera de Objeto Múltiple =

A Sociedad Financiera de Objeto Múltiple (also known as Sofom) is a form of enterprise under Mexican law. A Sofom's main objective is to provide loans and credit. They can either be regulated entities (ER) or non-regulated entities (ENR).
