= List of people executed in Mexico =

This is a list of people legally executed in Mexico. The death penalty was a legal punishment in Mexico since Pre-Columbian times, and was still applied during its contemporary history. The last non-military execution in Mexico was in June 1957 in the State of Sonora, where two men charged with child rape and murder were executed by firing squad, and the last military execution was in 1961, with the civil death penalty being abolished in 1976 and the military death penalty in 2005. The death penalty in Mexico was constitutionally abolished for civilian crimes in 2005, following decades without executions, aligning the country with international human rights standards.

According to Amnesty International, Mexico’s last known execution was of soldier José Isaías Constante Laureano in 1961, after which a de facto moratorium began.The next list is representative and includes people condemned and executed during Mexican history:

== Twentieth century ==
=== Civilian (until 1957) ===
Name of the convict	Execution date	Method	Charge	Jurisdiction	Description	Image
Arcadio Jiménez	28 April 1909	Firing squad	Murder	Mexico, Federal Government	Farmers condemned to death for murdering a policeman named Tomás Morales. The crime occurred during a protest in Chalco, State of Mexico, in the years previous to the beginning of the Mexican Revolution. Two other men, Hilario Silva and Marcelino Martínez, were executed for their participation in this murder.	
Marcelino Martínez	28 April 1909	Firing squad	Murder	Mexico, Federal Government	Farmers condemned to death for murdering a policeman named Tomás Morales. The crime occurred during a protest in Chalco, State of Mexico, in the years previous to the beginning of the Mexican Revolution. Two other men, Hilario Silva and Marcelino Martínez, were executed for their participation in this murder.	
Hilario Silva	28 April 1909	Firing squad	Murder	Mexico, Federal Government	Farmers condemned to death for murdering a policeman named Tomás Morales. The crime occurred during a protest in Chalco, State of Mexico, in the years previous to the beginning of the Mexican Revolution. Two other men, Hilario Silva and Marcelino Martínez, were executed for their participation in this murder.	
José de Jesús Negrete Medina	22 December 1910	Firing squad	Murder, robbery and organized delinquency	Mexico, Federal Government	37-year-old man, ex-military, and leader of a gang who was condemned to death for the murder of two policemen. Negrete was a bandit, better known as "The Tiger of Santa Julia" (Spanish: El Tigre de Santa Julia), with a modus operandi similar to Robin Hood. He was arrested and incarcerated in 1905 for several attacks on plantations, shops, and several armory stations. He escaped from prison and murdered two police officers in the process. He was re-arrested, sentenced to death, and executed by firing squad at Belem Prison in Mexico City in 1910.	
Margarita Ortega (magonist)	24 November 1913	Firing squad		Mexico		
Luis Segura Vilchis	23 November 1927	Firing squad	Conspiracy to commit murder, attempted murder, and terrorism	Mexico, Federal Government	Luis Segura Vilchis was a 24-year-old hydraulic engineer, and active member of group named Liga Nacional para la Defensa de las Libertades Religiosas (English: National League for the Defense of Religious Liberties). Miguel Pro was a Jesuit Catholic priest also known as Blessed Miguel Pro. Vilchis, Juan Tirado Arias, Miguel Pro, and Humberto Pro (brother of Miguel Pro) were condemned to death for the attempted murder of Mexican Presidential candidate, Álvaro Obregón. They orchestrated and executed a bomb attack on November 13, 1927 in Mexico City. The day of the murder attempt, Vilchis and three other men (Juan Tirado, Nahum Lamberto Ruiz, and an unidentified man) approached Obregón's retinue; Vilchis and Tirado threw two bombs at the retinue, while Ruíz shot at them. No fatalities resulted from the attack. A few hours later, Vilchis turned himself in. On 23 November 1927, Vilchis, Juan Tirado, and the brothers Miguel and Humberto Pro were executed. Neither Ruiz nor the unidentified man were executed for their roles in the plot. Pro's arrest, lack of trial, and evidential support gained prominence during the Cristero War, and his execution, intended to frighten Mexican Catholics, served the opposite effect. Known for his religious piety and innocence, Pro was beatified in Rome on September 25, 1988, by Pope John Paul II as a Catholic martyr, killed "in odium fidei" (in hatred of the faith).	
Juan Tirado Arias	23 November 1927	Firing squad	Conspiracy to commit murder, attempted murder, and terrorism	Mexico, Federal Government		
Father Miguel Agustín Pro	23 November 1927	Firing squad	Conspiracy to commit murder, attempted murder, and terrorism	Mexico, Federal Government		
Humberto Pro	23 November 1927	Firing squad	Conspiracy to commit murder, attempted murder, and terrorism	Mexico, Federal Government		
José de León Toral	9 February 1929	Firing squad	Magnicide and terrorism.	Mexico, Federal Government	29-year-old anti-government Roman Catholic who was condemned to death for the murder of Mexican president-elect, Álvaro Obregón. At 17 July 1928, at 2:20 pm, De León Toral shot Obregón six times while the president-elect ate in a restaurant named "La Bombilla" localised in San Ángel neighborhood, now Álvaro Obregón borough, Mexico City. De León was a destaca citizen without a criminal record, a father of three, a caricaturist, and a professional soccer player; he was convinced that the Obregón death would end the civil war. He was also opposed to the government's advocacy of anti-Catholicism. Some have considered him a martyr or hero, but the official position of the Mexican government and Mexican Roman Catholic clergy is that he was an extremist. Toral was shot in Palacio de Lecumberri, Mexico City. Reportedly, his last words were, "¡Viva Cristo Rey!" (English: Long Live Christ the King), the frequent defiant rallying cry of the Cristeros.	
Juan Castillo Martínez	17 February 1938	Firing squad (not an official, state-sanctioned execution)	Rape and murder.	Baja California	Soldier who was condemned to death for the rape and murder of an 8-year-old girl. He was sentenced with inconsistent evidence. After his death sentence was passed, he was removed from the courtroom and summarily executed under the ley fuga, a law active in Mexico at the time that allowed authorities to kill prisoners who attempted to flee; the law was also often used as an excuse for summary executions. After his death, rumors of his innocence persisted. Alleged apparitions of his ghost and miracles attributed to him caused some to believe that Juan Castillo, now called "Juan Soldado", was unjustly executed. He became an apocryphal saint venerated in some places near the U.S.-Mexican border.	
Francisco Ruiz Corrales	17 June 1957	Firing squad	Rape and murder.	Sonora	27-year-old laborer who was condemned to death for the rape and murder of María de la Luz Margarita Mendoza Noriega, a 9-year-old girl. On 18 January 1957, in Hermosillo, Sonora, Ruiz Corrales kidnapped the girl and carried her to an isolated place, where he raped and strangled her. The victim sold tomatoes in a local market, and several witnesses saw her go with Ruiz Corrales. He was arrested the same day of the murder and was sentenced to capital punishment one week afterwards. He was executed together with José Rosario Zamarripa, another man condemned for similar crimes.	

=== Military (until 1961) ===
Name of the convict	Execution date	Method	Charge	Jurisdiction	Description	Image
José Rosario Don Juan Zamarripa	17 June 1957	Firing squad	Kidnapping, rape and murder.	Sonora	40-year-old Mexican Revolution veteran who was condemned to death for the kidnapping, rape and murder of a young girl named Ernestina Leyva whose age has been inconsistently reported, according to official chronist of Hermosillo, Gilberto Escobosa, she was only 3 months old but other authors say she was 4 years old. The crime was committed in 1950, when Zamarripa kidnapped the girl, raped and strangled her and threw the body in the Yaqui River. Before his execution, he refused to confess to the Roman Catholic priest to receive the absolution. Was shot together with Francisco Ruíz.	
José Isaías Constante Laureano	9 August 1961	Firing squad	Murder and insubordination.	Coahuila	28-year-old soldier who was condemned to death for the murders of fellow soldiers Cristóbal Granados Jasso and Juan Pablo MaDobecker. An intoxicated Constante shot them after a dispute. The last petition of José Constante was to not cover his eyes during the execution because he wanted to see the breaking dawn. Dead at 4:30 am, in Saltillo military prison.	

=== Extrajudicial killings ===
Name of the convict	Execution date	Method	Charge	Jurisdiction	Description	Image
Juan Castillo Martínez	17 February 1938	Firing squad (not an official, state-sanctioned execution)	Rape and murder	Baja California	Male soldier who was condemned to death for the rape and murder of an 8-year-old girl. He was sentenced with inconsistent evidence. After his death sentencing, he was removed from the courtroom and summarily executed under the ley fuga, a law active in Mexico at the time that allowed authorities to kill prisoners who attempted to flee; the law was also often used as an excuse for summary executions. After his death, rumors of his innocence persisted. Alleged apparitions of his ghost and miracles attributed to him caused some to believe that Juan Castillo, now called "Juan Soldado", was unjustly executed. He became an apocryphal saint venerated in some places near the U.S.-Mexican border.	

== Commuted death sentences ==
Name of the convict	Sentenced date	Commuted date	Charge	Jurisdiction	Description	Image
Francisco Guerrero Pérez	1888	1904	Murder, rape and attempt murder	Distrito Federal (Mexico)	Serial killer who was sentenced to death for one murder and another attempt, he was 48 years old and was suspected of 20 murders more. His sentence was commuted to 20 years-prison time by Presidential order (Porfirio Díaz, the Mexican President in this time, had an anti-death penalty posture). Mistakenly he received an indult in 1904. In 1908, Guerrero killed again, his victim an elderly woman who was raped and beheaded. Guerrero was sentenced to death again, but died of a cerebral thromboembolism in 1910 before his execution.	
Wenceslao Moguel	1915	1915	Treason	Yucatán	Was accused of belonging to an insurgent group during the Mexican Revolution, was fusilled but survived to eight shoots and the coup de grâce into his face. Received the indult by the Government and 500.00 pesos.	
Eusebio Yocupicio Soto	1950	?	Murder	Sonora	Yoreme Amerindian men who were sentenced to death, accused of 7 murders committed in Huatabampo, Sonora, during 1950. According to the police investigations, Yocupicio and the other men maintained homosexual relationships, this rumor spread around the community, and the men were stigmatized, leading them to murder and mutilate seven men who they blamed for the rumor. Yocupicio and his accomplices were sentenced to death but were commuted to 30 years in prison. Several extenuating circumstances were considered as the socio-cultural conditions and the antecedent discrimination.	
Basilio Humo Valenzuela	1950	?	Murder	Sonora		
Leonardo Yocupicio Huipas	1950	?	Murder	Sonora		
Adelaido Huipas Quijano	1950	?	Murder	Sonora		
Dykes Askew Simmons	March 1961	1969	Murder	Nuevo León	American rampage killer who was sentenced to death for triple homicide. In 1959, he massacred three men, Villagómez Pérez family members. Simmons was a known mental patient, for this reason his sentence was commuted to 30 years-prison.	
Dr. Alfredo Ballí Treviño	November 1961	1981	Murder	Nuevo León	33-year-old physician who was sentenced to death for the murder and dismemberment of his boyfriend, Jesús Castillo Rangel. He was the last man condemned to death in Mexico. In October 1959, Dr. Treviño murdered his boyfriend after a dispute by drugging him and cutting his throat with a scalpel, Treviño then dismembered the body and placed the remains in a box, and buried it in a relative's farm under the pretext of it being "medical waste". After his capture, Treviño was incarcerated at the Topo Chico prison to await his execution, but his condemnation was commuted to 30 years-prison after the death penalty was abolished in Nuevo León. Was noted as a 'model prisoner' and was released after 20 years, after his release he re-obtained his medical license and continued his work as a physician. Died of natural causes in 2009 at the age of 80 years old. His history inspired the fictional character Hannibal Lecter.	
