= Intellectual property law in Mexico =

Industrial property law in Mexico has been changing in order to be updated with the international tendencies. The process of integration in NAFTA (North American Free Trade Agreement) is one the international factors that have affected the law. It has defined aspects of the current law, and especially its limitations in relation to foreign investments. The law is designed to protect inventions. Inventions are classified according to this law in patents, utility models and industrial designs. Each of them has different definitions and characteristics that the law explains. This article includes some background, legal definitions and effects of the law.

== Background ==
The oldest Mexican legal instrument directly related to industrial property is the “Law on property rights for inventors” which dates from 1832. It gave protection to certain types of ideas and inventions. It had a strong influence from Spanish law. In 1889, during the presidency of Porfirio Díaz, this law was replaced by the “Law of manufacturing trademarks” which had French influence. Although it has since been superseded, some aspects of this law were kept and used in further laws, such as the 1890 “Law of Patents and Privilege.” This remained in effect with almost no change in its essence until the “Law of Industrial Property" of 1943.

In 1903, the “Law of Industrial Trademarks and Commerce” included concepts of the international tendencies that had been unified by the Brussels Review (1900) and the Convention of Paris Union (1883). It has more technical features, introducing new elements like advertising and branding. In 1928, new laws for patents, invention, trademarks, advertising and branding were created. In the matter of patents, it included a testing procedure to determine if the “invention” was truly new. It included judicial procedures to attend to civil controversies and the compulsory use of trademarks for some merchandize as well. These laws of 1928 contained the world advances made manifest in the Convention of Paris Union (1983), the Washington Review (1911) and the Hague Review (1925).

The law of Industrial Property of 1943 was influenced by the London review of the Convention of Paris Union (1934). The law was criticized for giving "exaggerated protection" and other problems, so it was modified many times. The positives and the corrections made to the law served on the basis of the New Law of Inventions and Trademarks (1976). This law had influence as well from the agreement of Cartagena. It explored new socialist tendencies, like regulation for abuse and monopolies.

From 1976 until 1991 the Law of Invention and Trademarks was current, just some modifications were made. In 1991, the New Law of Industrial Property was issued. It is the current law that has been thoroughly reviewed and modified, especially to conciliate with North American standards in the process of the NAFTA (North American Free Trade Agreement).

== Legal definitions ==
According to the Mexican law named “Ley de propiedad industrial” (issued in 1991 and thoroughly modified for NAFTA standards) the author, or person, who creates an invention, a utility model or an industrial design has the right to exclusively exploit it for his benefit by himself or by someone authorized by him. Article 9 Patents apply to inventions. Registration applies to utility models and industrial designs. A physical person or a corporation can be given a patent or registration. Article 10 states that an invention is considered by law as “any human creation that allows for the transforming of matter or energy present in the natural environment, for human use, and to satisfy needs.” They have to be new or created as a result of an inventive activity, and applicable to industrial purposes. The law considers a utility model: “the objects, devices, machines or tools that, after being modified in their disposition, configuration, structure or form, present a different function from the parts that make them up, or utility advantages”

In Mexican law, the industrial designs are divided in industrial drawings and industrial models. The industrial drawings are a combination of figures, lines or colors that are added to a manufactured product, giving to it a characteristic aspect. The industrial models are three-dimensional shapes that function as a standard for the manufacture of a product, giving to it a specific appearance, without technical effects. A trademark is a symbol used to differentiate a product or service from competitors in the marketplace. The validity time of a patent, a utility model or an industrial design is not extendible and is counted from the moment of the request. A patent right is valid for 20 years, while a utility model is valid for 10 years and an industrial design is valid for 15 years. In the case of a trend, the validity time is 10 years. It is counted from the moment of the request and can be extended for the same period of 10 years .

== Effects of NAFTA on the Mexican Industrial Property Law ==
Before the law of 1991 was modified in 1994, the Mexican legislation considered that a Mexican judge had to attend all conflicts related to industrial property. This being compulsory, the Mexican legislation had to attend this kind of conflicts in Mexico. However, the reforms made in 1994 for integration with NAFTA, allow the parts involved in a contract to resolve their conflicts through an arbitration court. This arbitration court is different from the Mexican judicial system. There is international legislation that is based on the international agreements among countries. In the case of NAFTA, the bases are established in chapter XI. Then the Mexican legislation on expropriation and intellectual property do not apply for foreign investments in Mexico. According to NAFTA agreements, if one country cannot give the minimum guaranties to an investor, then the investor can go to an arbitration court. The arbitration court will defend the interests of the investor, without taking into account the national legislation of the defendant country. In the case of Mexico, the decisions could imply that the executive power revoke, with the approval of the senate, a law that has been issued by both chambers of representatives. On the other hand, Mexico only gives a patent right to individuals that accept the national legislation. Then Mexico establishes the restrictions for that patent. However the Mexican legislation could be just a reference after the patent is given, because the protected object of the patent is within an investment. The issues related to the investment are attended by the international agreements or the International Law. Countries may have the right to demand that a registered industrial property is used and exploited. They may have the right to avoid abuses that negatively affects the national interests of the country. There are some specific cases in which the country can establish some obligations related to the use of the patent and avoiding abuse of it. In this case the country has to pay a compensatory to the investor.

== Registering software ==
Software and any other kinds of computer programs can be registered in Mexico by filing a copyright application with Mexico's Copyright Office (Instituto Nacional del Derecho de Autor).

== See also ==
- Law of Mexico
- Mexican Institute of Industrial Property (IMPI)
- Federal Law on Protection of Personal Data Held by Individuals
