= Law of Mexico =

The law of Mexico is based upon the Constitution of Mexico and follows the civil law tradition.

== Sources ==
The hierarchy of sources of law can be viewed as the constitution, legislation, regulations, and then custom. Alternatively, the hierarchy can be viewed as the constitution, treaties, statutes, codes, doctrine, custom, and then general principles of law.

=== Federal Constitution ===
The Constitution of Mexico is the fundamental law (ley fundamental).

=== Legislation ===
Congress creates legislation in the form of regulatory laws (leyes reglamentarias) that implement the constitution, organic acts (leyes orgánicas) that implement the organization, powers, and functions of governmental agencies, and ordinary laws (leyes ordinarias). They are published in the Official Journal of the Federation (Diario Oficial de la Federación, DOF).

=== Regulations ===
The President of Mexico creates regulations (reglamentos) for the purpose of interpreting, clarifying, expanding, or supplementing the language of legislative enactments. They are published in the Official Journal of the Federation (Diario Oficial de la Federación, DOF).

=== Case law ===
Mexico utilizes a form of jurisprudence constante. The decisions of the Supreme Court are binding on lower courts as jurisprudencias only upon five consecutive and uninterrupted decisions (ejecutorias) approved by at least eight justices when in plenary sessions (en banc) or by at least four justices when in chambers. The decisions of the Collegiate Circuit Courts are jurisprudencias provided they are based upon five consecutive and uninterrupted decisions approved by the unanimous votes of the magistrates who compose each collegiate court. Decisions are distilled into theses (tesis), of which the tesis jurisprudencial are binding (jurisprudencia obligatoria), the tesis aisladas are not binding, and the tesis sobresalientes are theses of note which are not binding but have persuasive value.

Such decisions are published in the Federal Judicial Weekly (Semanario Judicial de la Federación) through its gazette (Gaceta del Semanario Judicial de la Federación). Complete decisions are rarely published in the Semanario, though it is not unheard of if the Supreme Court, a collegiate circuit court, or the General Coordinator of Compilation and Systematization of Theses (Coordinación General de Compilación y Sistematización de Tesis) deems they should be published; instead, it mainly includes tesis de jurisprudencia or tesis aisladas. Moreover, theses that have acquired the character of binding criteria (tesis de jurisprudencia) are published every year in an appendix to the Semanario.

In some jurisdictions, there may also exist executive administrative courts, which are not bound by these jurisprudencias.

=== Doctrine ===
The civil law tradition was developed by, and, as such, the "authorities" were and continue to be legal scholars, not judges and lawyers, as in the common law tradition. The legal treatises produced by these scholars are called doctrine (doctrina), and are used much in the same way case law is used in the common law tradition. However, these scholarly contributions do not carry the force of law and are not legally binding.

=== Custom ===
Mexican law recognizes custom, the rules, principles, and norms formed through a gradual but uniform passage of time, but only when this recognition is based upon an explicit provision of the applicable law allowing for such recognition.

=== General principles of law ===
"General principles of law", expressly cited by Article 14 of the Constitution, have not been expressly defined by legislation, but legal maxims such as equity, good faith, pacta sunt servanda, the right of self-defense, and suum cuique tend to be cited by legal scholars.

=== State constitutions and law ===
Each of Mexico's 31 states and Mexico City has its own constitution, known as a state or local constitution (Constitución del Estado or Constitutución local). Each state's or Mexico City's laws and regulations are published in their respective Official State Gazettes (Gaceta Oficial del Estado). At the state and local level, publication of complete binding court opinions (versus tesis) is extremely limited or simply nonexistent.

- Law of Aguascalientes
- Law of Baja California
- Law of Baja California Sur
- Law of Campeche
- Law of Chiapas
- Law of Chihuahua
- Law of Coahuila
- Law of Colima
- Law of Durango
- Law of Guanajuato
- Law of Guerrero
- Law of Hidalgo
- Law of Jalisco
- Law of the State of Mexico
- Law of Mexico City
- Law of Michoacán
- Law of Morelos
- Law of Nayarit
- Law of Nuevo León
- Law of Oaxaca
- Law of Puebla
- Law of Querétaro
- Law of Quintana Roo
- Law of San Luis Potosí
- Law of Sinaloa
- Law of Sonora
- Law of Tabasco
- Law of Tamaulipas
- Law of Tlaxcala
- Law of Veracruz
- Law of Yucatán
- Law of Zacatecas

== Jurisprudence ==
The civil law tradition (as developed by the legal scholars, i.e., doctrine) tends to treat the divisions of law in normative terms. There are two major areas of law: private law, concerning the relationships between individuals, and public law, concerning the relationships between individuals and the government. The civil code is the most important embodiment of law, based on Roman law. Other topics include those related to philosophy of law, including the major schools of thought and the major disagreements; objective law and subjective rights; substantive law and procedural law; statutory law and customary law; federal law, state law, and municipal law; and national law, international law, and community law.

== Public law ==
Mexico's major codes regarding public law are the Federal Criminal Code (the criminal code) and the National Criminal Procedure Code (the code of criminal procedure). Other codes of importance include the Fiscal Code (Codigo Fiscal de la Federacion) (tax law) and the Federal Labor Law (Ley Federal del Trabajo) (Mexican labor law).

== Private law ==
Mexico's major codes regarding private law are the Federal Civil Code (the civil code), Federal Commercial Code (the commercial code), and the Federal Civil Procedure Code (the code of civil procedure).

== See also ==
=== Topics ===
- Abortion in Mexico
- Capital punishment in Mexico
- Crime in Mexico
- Life imprisonment in Mexico
- Euthanasia in Mexico
- Gun politics in Mexico
- Human rights in Mexico
- Illegal immigration in Mexico
- Intellectual property law in Mexico
- Mexican labor law
- LGBT rights in Mexico
- Mexican nationality law
- Recurso de amparo

=== Other ===
- Politics of Mexico
- Law enforcement in Mexico
