= Mexican Institute of Industrial Property =

Mexico's patent office

The Mexican Institute of Industrial Property (Spanish: Instituto Mexicano de la Propiedad Industrial; IMPI) is the patent and trademark administration body of Mexico. The IMPI was created on 10 December 1993 by the Decreto por el que se crea el Instituto Mexicano de la Propiedad Industrial.

== See also ==
- Intellectual property law in Mexico
