= Euthanasia in Mexico =

Current status of euthanasia in Mexico: Passive euthanasia is legal Not legislated

Legislation on euthanasia in Mexico distinguishes between passive and active euthanasia. Since January 7, 2008, the law allows the terminally ill —or closest relatives, if unconscious— to refuse medication or further medical treatment that may extend life (known as passive euthanasia) in Mexico City, in the state of Aguascalientes (since April 6, 2009) and, since September 1, 2009, in the state of Michoacán. As of 2024, similar “leyes de Voluntad Anticipada” (advance directive laws) are in force in 14 Mexican states.

While the exact procedure may vary, the regional laws dealing with living wills —usually called leyes de Voluntad Anticipada— generally require a notary public to witness the instructions left by the patient.

As for active euthanasia, the Party of the Democratic Revolution (PRD) and the Institutional Revolutionary Party (PRI) have introduced bills to decriminalize it in both the Senate (2007) and the Legislative Assembly of the Federal District (2009), but have failed to change the Article 166 bis 21 of the General Health Law, which still defines euthanasia as mercy homicide. The Federal Penal Code continues to criminalize medically assisted death, with penalties of 1 to 12 years in prison, and no jurisdiction in Mexico currently permits active euthanasia. In 2023, new federal bills were introduced to allow assisted dying under strict conditions, but none have been enacted. In addition, as of December 2010, 18 out of 31 states have modified their constitution under pressure from the dominant Catholic Church to protect the right to life "from the moment of conception until natural death", effectively discarding any initiative contemplating active euthanasia within state borders. By 2025, at least 19 states have adopted such amendments.

== Practice ==
Official statistics are scarce, but bioethicist Horacio García Romero claims that up to 45% of the terminally-ill patients in the country demand some form of passive euthanasia. In October 2010, the secretary of health for Mexico City announced that, since the legalization of passive euthanasia, 497 patients have formalized the process, including at least 41 out-of-state residents and 2 citizens of the United States.

== Public opinion and political lobbying ==
According to a Parametría poll conducted in February 2008, 59% of Mexicans think doctors should have the legal right to end the life of a person suffering from an incurable illness upon a request by the patient and his or her relatives, while 35% disagree.

Its main opponents, anti-abortion activists and Christian churches —particularly the dominant Roman Catholic Church— have strongly lobbied against active euthanasia and promote different bills protecting the right to life "from the moment of conception until natural death." However, regional bills supporting passive euthanasia have been endorsed by several Catholic clergymen, including the archbishops of León and Morelia.

== Suicide tourism ==
A drug known as liquid pentobarbital is used by owners to euthanize pets. When given to humans, the drug is thought to result in a painless death in approximately one hour. The pet shops across Mexico have such drugs. As a result, elderly tourists from across the globe seeking to terminate their own lives were reported to be flying out to Mexico.

In the past, Mexico's lenient regulations regarding pentobarbital—a barbiturate used for euthanizing animals—led to its misuse by individuals seeking assisted suicide. This resulted in "suicide tourism," with people traveling to Mexico to obtain the drug.

However, significant legal actions have since addressed this issue. In May 2024, Daniel Gonzalez-Munguia, operating under the alias Alejandro Vasquez, was indicted for illegally importing pentobarbital from Mexico into the United States for suicide purposes. He was charged with importing and distributing a controlled substance, facing up to 60 years in federal prison.

== See also ==
- Law of Mexico
