= Semanario Judicial de la Federación =

The Mexican Federal Judicial Weekly (Semanario Judicial de la Federación) contains the published jurisprudencias of the judiciary of Mexico.

Mexico utilizes a form of jurisprudence constante. The decisions of the Supreme Court are binding on lower courts as jurisprudencias only upon five consecutive and uninterrupted decisions (ejecutorias) approved by at least eight justices when in plenary sessions (en banc) or by at least four justices when in chambers. The decisions of the Collegiate Circuit Courts are jurisprudencias provided they are based upon five consecutive and uninterrupted decisions approved by unanimity of votes of the magistrates who compose each collegiate court. Decisions are distilled into theses (tesis), of which the tesis jurisprudencial are binding (jurisprudencia obligatoria), the tesis aisladas are not binding, and the tesis sobresalientes are theses of note which are not binding but have persuasive value.

Such decisions are published through its gazette (Gaceta del Semanario Judicial de la Federación). Complete decisions are rarely published in the Semanario, though it is not unheard of if the Supreme Court, a collegiate circuit court, or the General Coordinator of Compilation and Systematization of Theses (Coordinación General de Compilación y Sistematización de Tesis) deems they should be published; instead, it mainly includes tesis de jurisprudencia or tesis aisladas. Moreover, theses that have acquired the character of binding criteria (tesis de jurisprudencia) are published every year in an appendix to the Semanario.

The Semanario is broken down into series of nine Épocas. The first four Épocas (1871–1910) are called jurisprudencia histórica and are not binding; the jurisprudencia applicable starting with the fifth Época (1918–1957) are binding. The most recent is the tenth Época (October 2011–).

In some jurisdictions, there may also exist executive administrative courts, which are not bound by these jurisprudencias.
