= Capital punishment in Mexico =

Capital punishment has been abolished in Mexico since 15 March 2005. The last civilian execution in the country occurred in 1957, and the last military execution in 1961.

Mexico is the world's most populous country to have abolished the death penalty.

== History ==
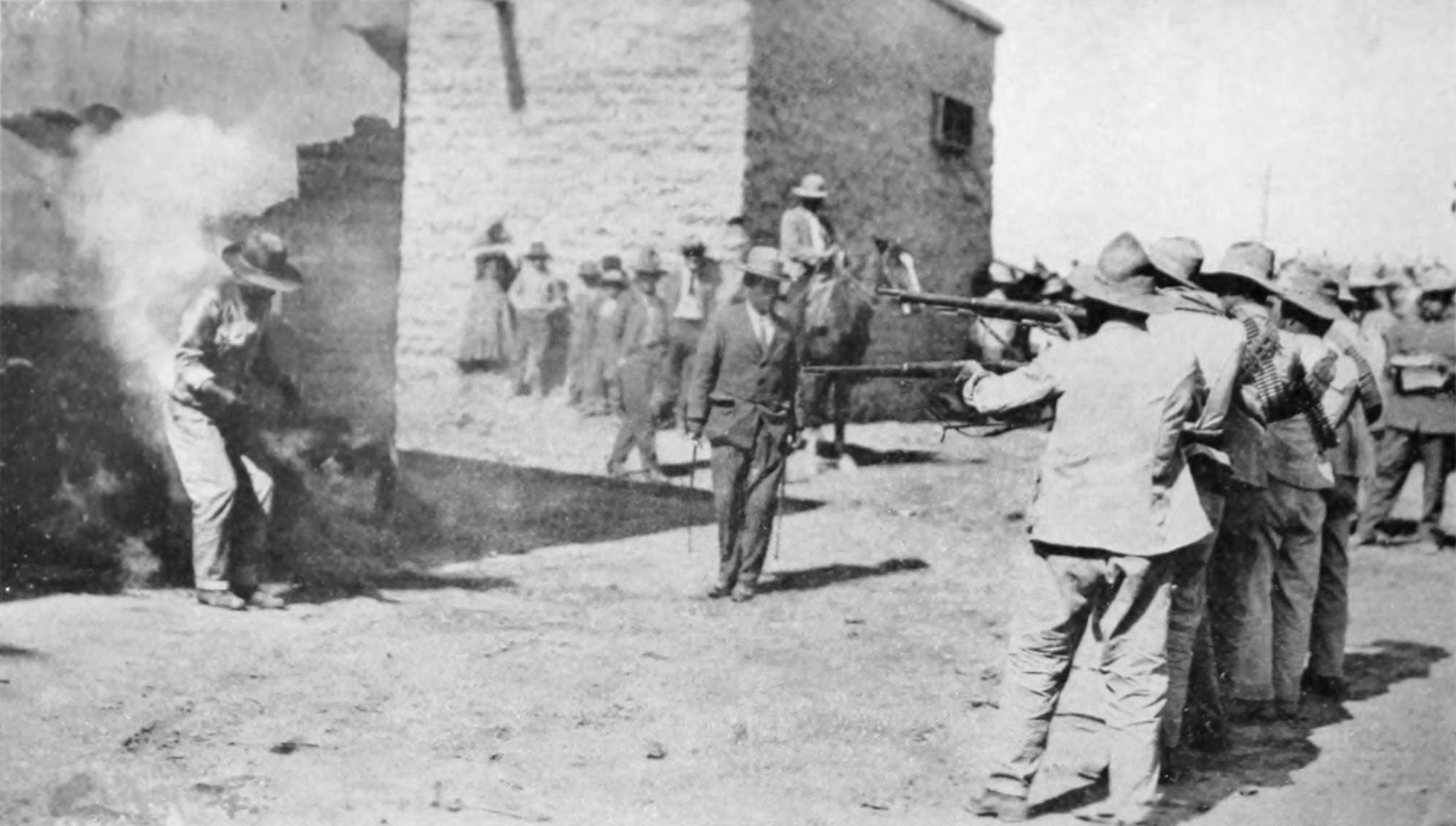
A Mexican execution by firing squad in 1916

There is significant history of abolitionism in Mexico, dating back to the 19th century. Following the Plan of Ayutla, the 1857 constitution was drafted, which specifically outlawed the death penalty for political crimes, and allowed abolition for ordinary crimes in the future. Mexico's government at that time was quite unstable, and the express abolition of political crimes could have been linked to concern that the lawmakers themselves could become subject to the punishment if there was an uprising. Personal experiences too may have been a factor, as many Mexicans had experienced political repression. There was widespread condemnation of the death penalty in the media, and many Mexican literates were familiar with the work of Cesare, Marquis of Beccaria. Following the rule of Porfirio Díaz, the death penalty article was amended in the reform which led to the current Constitution of Mexico.

The last non-military execution in Mexico was in 1957 in Sonora, and the last military execution (of a soldier charged with insubordination and murder) in 1961, so the official abolition of the military death penalty in 2005 and of the civil death penalty in 1976 lagged the de facto cessations by 44 and 19 years, respectively.

Mexico is a majority Roman Catholic country, with 88% of the population identifying themselves as adherents. The Vatican has made numerous statements criticizing capital punishment, and this may be a factor in the debate in Mexico.

In 2003, the State of Mexico voted in a nonbinding referendum regarding the death penalty. 82% of the 806,416 people who voted, voted Yes for the death penalty on crimes of murder, kidnapping, child theft and violent assaults.

In a debate during the 2018 Mexican general election, candidate Jaime Rodríguez Calderón proposed to reinstate the death penalty for drug traffickers, hijackers, infanticides and serial killers.

=== Mexican drug war ===
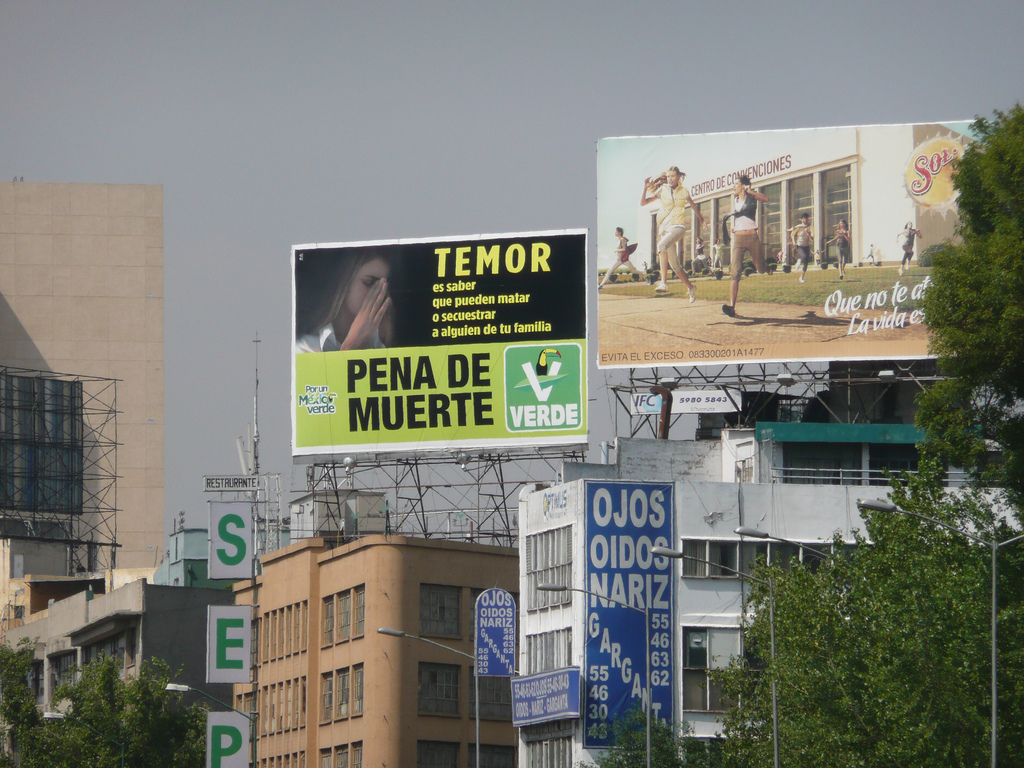
A Green Party billboard in 2008 promoting the restoration of the death penalty.

The Mexican drug war has fueled rising rates of violent crimes such as kidnapping and murder, prompting a reemergence of capital punishment into the political discourse. The Ecologist Green Party of Mexico (PVEM), waged a campaign to promote restoration of the death penalty, including the use of billboards, as part of promotion of the party for the 2009 election for seats in Congress. There have been proposals to amend the 1917 Constitution to allow capital punishment from both the PVEM and the Institutional Revolutionary Party (PRI), but both were rejected. Surveys in 2009 suggested that up to 70% of the population supported the restoration of the death penalty, however it is unlikely that the constitution will be changed, as both religious and human rights groups have strongly opposed restoration.

A 2017 poll study found younger Mexicans are more likely to support capital punishment.

Constitution: Article 22

Cruel and unusual punishment is prohibited. Specifically, penalties of death, mutilation, infamy, marks, physical punishments, torments, excessive fines, confiscation of assets, and others are abolished.

Confiscation of assets does not include the application of said assets to pay for civil responsibilities caused by a crime, or when used to pay taxes or other fines. Nor will it be confiscation when said assets are part of illegal activities, or when they are related to organized crime, or when proof of ownership cannot be established.

== International relations ==
In 1981, Mexico ratified the American Convention on Human Rights, a treaty of the Organization of American States, which prohibits the death penalty from being restored if eliminated. Mexico does not extradite to countries that are seeking the death penalty, and has successfully defended 400 of its citizens charged with a capital offence in the United States. This has in the past led to American fugitives crossing the border into Mexico in order to avoid the death penalty.

In 2002, President Vicente Fox cancelled a trip to the United States to meet US President George W. Bush, in protest of the then imminent execution of a Mexican national, Javier Suárez Medina, in the U.S. state of Texas. Medina had been convicted in 1989 for killing an undercover police officer in Dallas. According to Mexican officials, Suárez was not informed about his right to consular access, and fourteen countries lobbied the United States Supreme Court on behalf of him.

In 2003 Mexico filed a complaint against the United States at the International Court of Justice, alleging that the US had contravened the Vienna Convention by not allowing 54 Mexicans sentenced to death to receive consular assistance.

== See also ==
- Law of Mexico
- List of people executed in Mexico

== Sources ==
- Clarke, Alan William; Whitt, Laurelyn (2007), The bitter fruit of American justice, University Press of New England, ISBN 978-1-55553-682-4
- Sarat, Austin; Boulanger, Christian (2005), The cultural lives of capital punishment, Stanford University Press, ISBN 978-0-8047-5234-3
- Sarre, Rick; Das, Dilip K.; Albrecht, Hans-Jörg (2005), Policing corruption, Lexington Books, ISBN 978-0-7391-0809-3
- Ackoff, Russell Lincoln (1994), The democratic corporation, Oxford University Press, ISBN 978-0-19-508727-7
- Ewell, Gordan F. (2005), Mexico: migration, U.S. economic issues and counter narcotic efforts, Nova Publishers, ISBN 978-1-59454-650-1
