= Los Huipas =

Mexican serial killers

Los Huipas refers to the media-coined nickname of a group of Mexican serial killers, all of whom were members of the Mayo ethnic group. They are considered the first serial killers of indigenous descent in the country.

== Members ==
- Eusebio Yocupicio Soto was the leader.

The rest of the members included:

- Adelaido Huipas Quijano
- Leonardo Yocupicio Huipas
- Basilio Humo Valenzuela

== Background and crimes ==
All natives of Huatabampo, Sonora, the men were first and second cousins, whom allegedly had incestual homosexual relationships with one another. Rumors about their lifestyles led to them being marginalized and discriminated against by the rest of the community. Motivated by their desire for revenge, between 1949 and 1950, the gang ended up murdering seven men, who had previously ridiculed them. Using deception, they would lure their victims to a secluded hut, where they stabbed, strangled, or beat them to death. After the killings, they would mutilate the corpses, preserving the castrated genitals from the bodies.

== Arrest and imprisonment ==
They were arrested on April 13, 1950, following a complaint from Felipe Buitimia, the father of Los Huipas' last victim - Vicente Buitimia. The four were sentenced to death, but after the abolition of the death penalty in Mexico, each of their sentences were commuted to 30 years imprisonment. Eusebio and Basilio died in prison from tuberculosis, while Adelaido and Leonardo served out their sentences fully, with nothing known about them after their release.
