= Pensions in Mexico =

Mexico reformed its pension system in 1997, transforming it from a pay as you go (PAYG), defined benefit (DB) scheme to a fully funded, private and mandatory defined contribution (DC) scheme. The reform was modeled after the pension reforms in Chile in the early 1980s, and was a result of recommendations from the World Bank. On December 10, 2020, the Mexican pension system would again undergo a major reform.

== Structure ==
Participants in the Mexican system choose from a variety of private pension fund managers called Administradores de Fondos para el Retiro (AFOREs). AFOREs are responsible for managing individual accounts and investing savings in the pension funds called Sociedades de Inversion Especializadas para el Retiro (SIEFOREs). SIEFOREs are separate legal entities with their own Board of Directors, and segregated assets from AFOREs.

== Pension system prior to 1995 reforms ==
In 1943 the Mexican government ratified legislation designed to provide its workers with social insurance administered by the Mexican Social Security Institute (Instituto Mexicano del Seguro Social) defined benefit program. Measuring the number of years an individual contributed to the system while also calculating the number of funds accumulated by tripartite worker-employer-state contributions serve to determine the levels of pension granted with a minimum requirement of five hundred weeks of contributions for qualification.

During the Salinas administration, 1984–1994, financial issues linked to the social insurance program and concerns for competition protection induced policymakers to consider a complete overhaul and privatization of the pension system. However, opposition from labor organizations and the need to maintain their support for the free trade agreement (NAFTA) with the United States and Canada forced Salinas to implement only partial privatization reforms. Nevertheless, with the added private pillar to the existing public pension system, the foundation for the eventual privatization of the entire arrangement was definitively put in place.

Since 1989, the guaranteed minimum pension earned with the satisfaction of requirements had been indexed to the minimum wage, but it failed to reflect the growth of real average wages that occurred during the 1990s. It was quite common for workers to contribute to the IMSS with earnings between one and three times the minimum wage and subsequently only to receive the bare minimum pension. As a result of this stark dissociation between contribution levels and earned benefits, workers often avoided paying IMSS salary deductions either by working unofficially or joining the informal sector. In addition, employers frequently refused to declare their actual number of employees in an effort to reduce contributions to the IMSS. In light of such structural issues along with fears of running a deficit and high inflation rates, the Zedillo administration, 1994-2000, was ultimately compelled to initiate further reform.

== Reformation of the pension system ==
For the Zedillo administration, the severe devaluation of the peso and the subsequent 1995 economic crisis served to expose the potential risks associated with capital account openness emboldening policymakers to search for new methods that encourage domestic savings. Like many other Latin American countries that emulated the Chilean model, Mexico also decided to take a similar approach in their attempts to privatize the pension system under the IMSS. With the prescription of the World Bank, the Zedillo administration sought legislation that not only privatized the IMSS pensions but also IMSS healthcare, however opposition from labor and teacher unions halted the privatization of the latter.

Though the proposed legislation was adopted in 1995, its full implementation was delayed until 1997. Consequently, the entire public pension system provided by the IMSS />

In 2004, the Fox administration, 2000-2006, implemented further reform as the financial health of the IMSS continued to serve as a significant concern. Through government reports and IMSS internal documents, it was discovered that the generous pension scheme enjoyed by the institute's own employees was largely the facilitator of the weak financial performance in question. Prior to the 2004 reform, IMSS employees were treated with greater leniency as they were allowed to retire earlier thus completing fewer years of contribution yet they received levels of benefits well above those granted to retiring workers in other economic sectors. Following the reform, IMSS workers were forced to receive their benefits through the privatized pension system rather than through their labor contract, however, overall, the reform failed to make any significant positive impact. Instead, it had a more symbolic effect as it engendered the future retrenchment of the welfare state and the dissolution of union opposition to future reforms.

== Economic shortcomings and gender disparities ==
For proponents of the pension reform, privatization was regarded as necessary in resolving the financial issues surrounding Mexico's social security system in two main ways. The first, privatization limits the pension system's vulnerability to changing demographics, and secondly, it insulates the system from political interference. However, for some critics, such claims are unconvincing. In their view, the state lost a substantial portion of its social security revenue through the cost of transition in the short to medium term, and that other types of reforms, like increasing taxes or eliminating special benefits to privileged groups, would have been more cost efficient. Critics have also asserted that it is unclear whether or not mandated pension saving is conducive to an increase in national saving or that it simply elicits a change in private and public proportions of saving. From a skeptical perspective, the privatization of the pension system merely serves to expose the Mexican state's direct intervention to create new markets favoring special interest groups, particularly financial corporations.

Other critics have argued that the privatization of the pension system will only exacerbate levels of gender inequality and stratification. Under Mexico's pension system of defined-contributions, differences in work habits between male and female workers can lead to disparities in both the accumulation stage (working period) and the withdrawal stage (retirement). In the first, pension savings are indicative of gender differences in earnings and labor-market participation (e.g., women tend to have shorter employment histories and change jobs more frequently). Because the pension reform increased the required minimum number of years of contributions, for women, this tends to be less de-commodifying than the previous pension plan due to the fact that the average women often fails to satisfy this requirement. In Latin America, it is quite common and even expected for women to stay at home and act as a familial caretakers- thus remaining dependent on their husbands. As a result of their short working hours, women are frequently unable to purchase a minimum pension with whatever earnings and interest they accumulate in their individual pension accounts. In the second stage, women's higher life expectancies entail that the period in which benefits are received is subsequently longer. Because Mexico, along with other Latin American countries, utilizes gender-specific mortality tables, the pension systems of individual accounts do not pool the risks of longevity between the sexes. With limited pension funds, longer retirements, and a reformed pension system considerably sensitive to wage levels, the level of stratification between the sexes may only worsen.

== 2020 reforms ==
On December 10, 2020, both houses of the Mexican Congress passed a major overhaul to Mexico's pension system which caps the fees pension funds can charge, and increases employers’ contributions to pension pots as part of a hike in workers’ total contributions, to 15% of salary from 6.5%. The law also raises the sum workers are guaranteed to receive. The new law will also lower the number of weeks workers must have paid in to claim retirement benefits from 1,250 to 1,000.
