= Jurisprudence constante =

Legal doctrine

Jurisprudence constante (French for "stable jurisprudence", or literally, "constant jurisprudence") is a legal doctrine according to which a long series of previous decisions applying a particular legal principle or rule is highly persuasive now a controlling in subsequent cases dealing with similar or identical issues of law. This doctrine is recognized in most civil law jurisdictions as well as in certain mixed jurisdictions such as Louisiana.

The rule of law applied in the jurisprudence constante directly compares with stare decisis. But the Louisiana Supreme Court notes the principal difference between the two legal doctrines: a single court decision can provide sufficient foundation for stare decisis; however, "a series of adjudicated cases, all in accord, form the basis for jurisprudence constante." Moreover, the Louisiana Court of Appeal has explicitly noted that within Louisiana, jurisprudence constante is merely a secondary source of law, which cannot be authoritative and does not rise to the level of the source of law, which is legislation. Judicial decisions are not intended to be an authoritative source of law, and, thus, the civilian tradition does not recognize the doctrine of stare decisis.

== See also ==
- Court
