= Synarchism =

Conspiracy theory

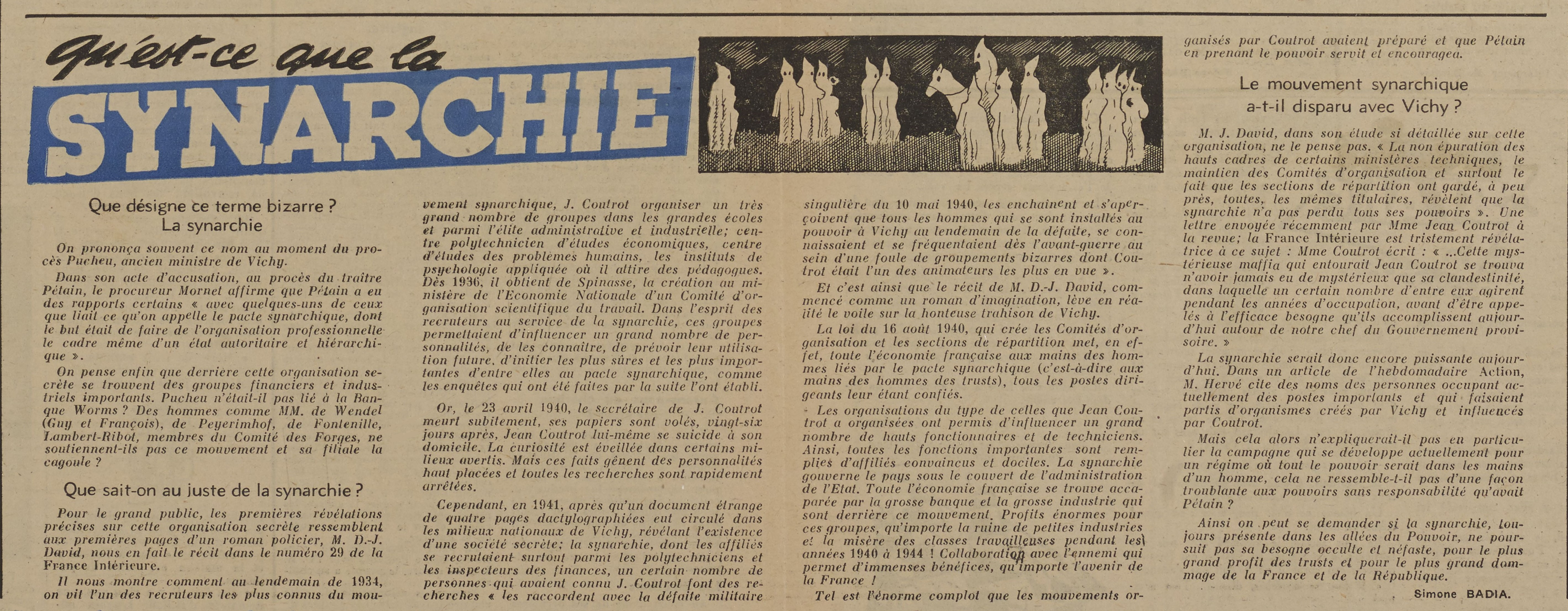
Femmes françaises n° 46 (10 August 1945)

Synarchism generally means "joint rule" or "harmonious rule". Beyond this general definition, both synarchism and synarchy have been used to denote rule by a secret elite in Vichy France, Italy, China, and Hong Kong, while also being used to describe a pro-Catholic theocracy movement in Mexico.

== Origins ==
The earliest recorded use of the term synarchy is attributed to Thomas Stackhouse (1677–1752), an English clergyman who used the word in his New History of the Holy Bible from the Beginning of the World to the Establishment of Christianity (published in two folio volumes in 1737). The attribution can be found in the Webster's Dictionary (the American Dictionary of the English Language, published by Noah Webster in 1828). Webster's definition for synarchy is limited entirely to "joint rule or sovereignty". The word is derived from the Greek stems syn meaning "with" or "together" and archy meaning "rule".

The most substantial early use of the word synarchy comes from the writings of Alexandre Saint-Yves d'Alveydre (1842–1909), who used the term in his book La France vraie to describe what he believed was the ideal form of government. In reaction to the emergence of anarchist ideologies and movements, Saint-Yves elaborated a political formula which he believed would lead to a harmonious society. He defended social differentiation and hierarchy with collaboration between social classes, transcending conflict between social and economic groups: synarchy, as opposed to his conception of anarchy. Specifically, Saint-Yves envisioned a Federal Europe (as well as all the states it has integrated) with a corporatist government composed of three councils, one for academia, one for the judiciary, and one for commerce.

== Rule by a secret elite ==
The word synarchy is used, especially among French and Spanish speakers, to describe a shadow government or deep state, a form of government where political power effectively rests with a secret elite, in contrast to an oligarchy where the elite is or could be known by the public.

=== Pacte Synarchique ===
The Pacte Synarchique is a historical theory that the surrender of Vichy France was as a result of a conspiracy by French industrial and banking interests to surrender France to Hitler in order to fight Communism. The original Pacte was supposedly discovered after the death in 1941 of Jean Coutrot, former member of Groupe X-Crise. According to this document, a Mouvement Synarchique d'Empire had been founded in 1922 with the aim of abolishing parliamentarianism and replacing it with synarchy. A Vichy investigation found no evidence for the Mouvement Synarchiste d'Empire existence. Most of the presumed synarchists were either associated with the Banque Worms or with Groupe X-Crise and were close to Admiral François Darlan the Vichy prime minister (1941–1942). Most historians agree that the Pacte was a hoax created by some French collaborators with Nazi Germany to weaken Darlan and his Vichy technocrats.

=== Lyndon LaRouche ===
Lyndon LaRouche, leader of the LaRouche movement, described a wide-ranging historical phenomenon, starting with Alexandre Saint-Yves d'Alveydre and the Martinist Order followed by important individuals, organizations, movements and regimes that are alleged to have been synarchist, including the government of Nazi Germany. He claimed that during the Great Depression an international coalition of financial institutions, raw materials cartels, and intelligence operatives installed fascist regimes throughout Europe (and tried to do so in Mexico) to maintain world order and prevent the repudiation of international debts. LaRouche identified the former U.S. vice president and former PNAC member Dick Cheney as a modern "synarchist", and claimed that "synarchists" have "a scheme for replacing regular military forces of nations, by private armies in the footsteps of a privately financed international Waffen-SS like scheme, a force deployed by leading financier institutions, such as the multi-billions funding by the U.S. Treasury, of Cheney's Halliburton gang."

== Other uses ==
=== Qing China ===
Harvard historian and sinologist John K. Fairbank used the word synarchy in his 1953 book Trade and Diplomacy on the China Coast: The Opening of the Treaty Ports, 1842–1854, and in later writings, to describe the mechanisms of government under the Qing dynasty in China. Fairbank's synarchy is a form of joint rule by co-opting existing Manchu and Han Chinese elites and bringing the foreign powers into the system and legitimizing them through a schedule of rituals and tributes that gave them a stake in the Qing dynasty rule. He believed that the Qing, who were considered outside rulers because of their Manchu origins, developed this strategy out of necessity because they did not have a strong political base in China.

=== Hong Kong ===
The term is also used by some political scientists to describe the British colonial government in Hong Kong (1842–1997). Ambrose King, in his 1975 paper Administrative Absorption of Politics in Hong Kong, described colonial Hong Kong's administration as "elite consensual government". In it, he claimed, any coalition of elites or forces capable of challenging the legitimacy of Hong Kong's administrative structure would be co-opted by the existing apparatus through the appointment of leading political activists, business figures and other elites to oversight committees, by granting them British honours, and by bringing them into elite institutions like Hong Kong's horse racing clubs. He called this synarchy, by extension of Fairbank's use of the word.

=== Mexican synarchism ===
Synarchy is also the name of the ideology of a political movement in Mexico dating from the 1930s. In Mexico, it was historically a movement of the Roman Catholic extreme right, in some ways akin to fascism, violently opposed to the populist and secularist policies of the revolutionary (PNR, PRM, and PRI) governments that ruled Mexico from 1929 to 2000.

The National Synarchist Union (Unión Nacional Sinarquista, UNS) was founded in May 1937 by a group of Catholic political activists led by José Antonio Urquiza, who was murdered in April 1938, and Salvador Abascal as a revival of the Cristero movement. In 1946, a faction of the movement loyal to deposed leader Manuel Torres Bueno regrouped as the Popular Force Party (Partido Fuerza Popular). Synarchism revived as a political movement in the 1970s through the Mexican Democratic Party (PDM), whose candidate, Ignacio González Gollaz, polled 1.8 percent of the vote at the 1982 presidential election. In 1988 Gumersindo Magaña polled a similar proportion, but the party then suffered a split, and, in 1992, lost its registration as a political party. It was dissolved in 1996.

There are now two organisations, both calling themselves the Unión Nacional Sinarquista, one aligning to Francoist policies, the other following the National Syndicalism of Primo De Rivera. Carlos Abascal, son of Salvador Abascal, was Mexico's Secretary of the Interior during Vicente Fox's presidency. Many sinarquistas are now militant in the National Action Party, PAN, of former presidents Vicente Fox (2000–2006) and Felipe Calderón (2006–2012).
