= Emilio Ulloa Pérez =

Mexican politician

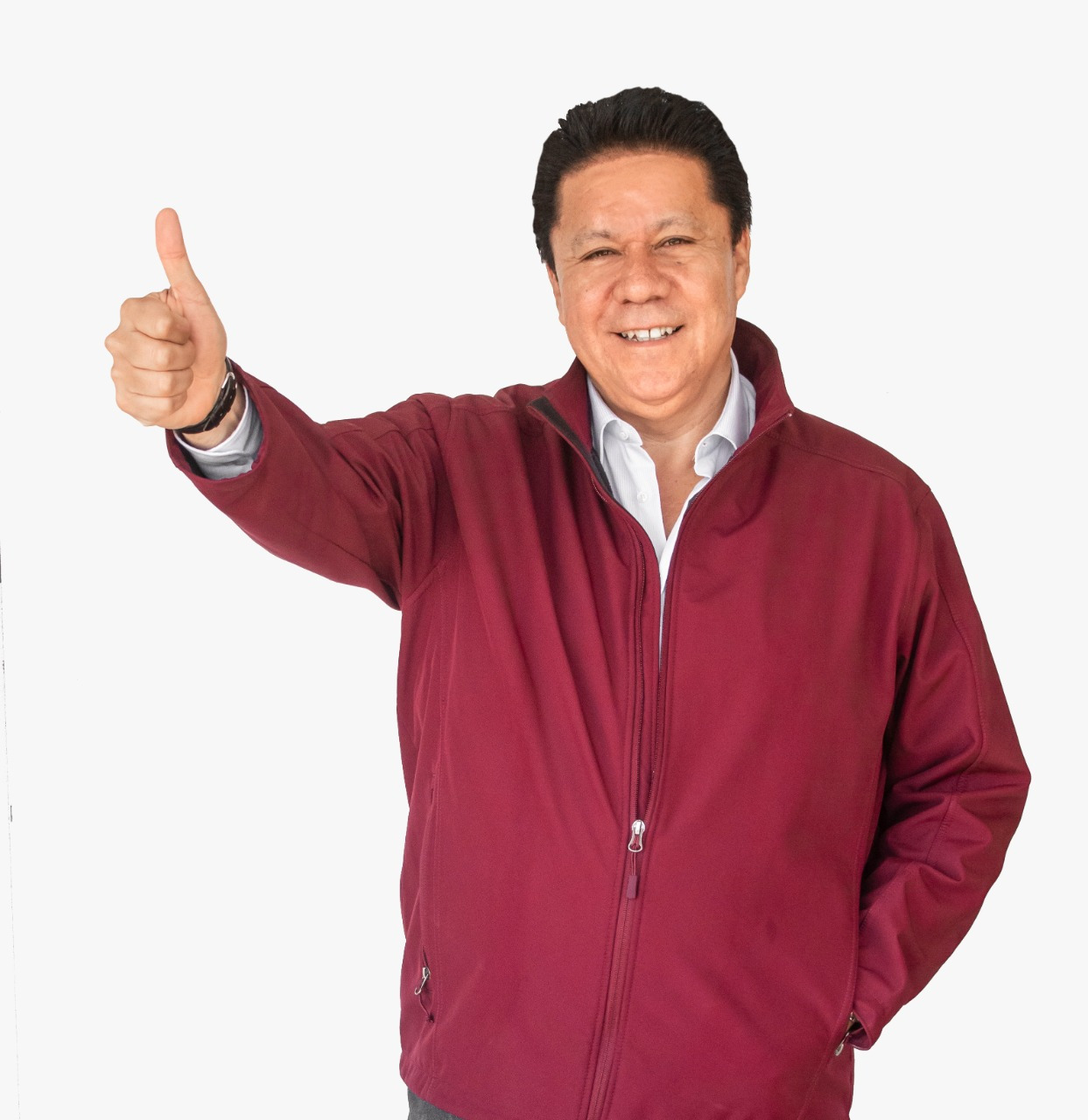
- 2021
- Born: 31 May 1964 (age 61); Tierra y Libertad, Jiquipilas, Chiapas, Mexico
- Occupation: Politician
- Political party: PRD (1989–2009); MC; MORENA
- Relatives: Brothers Gerardo and Carlos

Emilio Ulloa Pérez (Note: In this Mexican name, the surname is Ulloa and the second or maternal family name is Pérez.) (born 31 May 1964) is a Mexican politician. At different times he has been affiliated to the Party of the Democratic Revolution (PRD), the Citizens' Movement (MC), and the National Regeneration Movement (Morena).

In the 2000 general election he was elected to the Chamber of Deputies as a PRD plurinominal deputy for the 5th electoral region during the 58th Congress, and in the 2006 general election he was elected to the Chamber of Deputies to represent the State of Mexico's 29th district for the PRD during the 60th Congress.

== Family ==
Ulloa Pérez's younger siblings are also involved in politics: Gerardo (born 1965) has served in Congress for both the PRD (State of Mexico's 30th district, 2003–2006) and Morena (State of Mexico's 29th district, 2024–2027), while Carlos (born 1970) was elected for Mexico City's 5th district on the Morena ticket in the 2024 election and has close ties to President Claudia Sheinbaum dating back to her time as mayor of Tlalpan.
