= José Antonio Urquiza =

Mexican politician (1904–1938)

José Antonio Urquiza Septién
- Born: José Antonio Urquiza Septién; April 10, 1904; Santiago de Querétaro, Querétaro, Mexico
- Died: April 11, 1938 (aged 34); Apaseo el Grande, Guanajuato, Mexico
- Cause of death: Stab wounds
- Known for: Co-founder and financer of the National Synarchist Union

José Antonio Urquiza Septién (April 10, 1904 – April 11, 1938) was a Mexican integrist, wealthy landowner, and a key figure in developing Mexican synarchism. Along with many other radical Catholics, Urquiza co-founded the far-right National Synarchist Union (UNS). He had given a considerable amount of his fortune to the organization and heavily financed the group's early activities and growth.

Urquiza is often erroneously cited as having been leader and sole founder of the UNS. Urquiza was not an ideologue and did not have an interest in politics. During his brief time with the UNS, which he regarded as a civic association, the organization had not yet established its core tenets of synarchism. Urquiza was noted to have vehemently opposed the politicization of the organization.

== Early life ==
Urquiza was born to a prominent and wealthy family of landowners in Santiago de Querétaro on April 10, 1904. His father's name was Manuel M. Urquiza. His family lost a considerable amount of land during the Mexican Revolution.

== National Synarchist Union ==
Urquiza had been a part of a secret Catholic society and organization known as The Base or The Legion based in Guadalajara. Since at least 1934, he was leader of the Guanajuato division.

The council of The Base intended to establish a public organization to further the group's goals. A meeting among other division leaders was to be conducted in order to create the organization. At the request of Urquiza, the meeting was held in Guanajuato. This meeting would occur on 23 May 1937 with 137 in attendance, establishing the National Synarchist Union.

On June 12, 1937, Urquiza and José Trueba Olivares drafted the synarchist manifesto. The manifesto was criticized by Salvador Abascal for being very vague in its statement and goals of the organization. However, Urquiza's draft served as a basis for synarchism with Gonzalo Campos revising it later. Urquiza vehemently opposed that the UNS be a political party.

In September 1937, Urquiza travelled to Washington accompanied by his brother Carlos and Abascal. There they met with prominent American bishops including Ambrose Burke to discuss the future of the Synarchist movement and to ensure that the movement would not encounter any hindrance in the southern American dioceses.

Urquiza effectively became an ambassador for the movement in the United States.

== Murder ==
Urquiza had gone to the town of Apaseo el Grande, Guanajuato, to settle a land dispute. Apparently, Urquiza had a dispute with a farmer, Isidro Parra, who had been working on his property. While waiting for a train to Querétaro in the afternoon on April 11, 1938, Urquiza was stabbed by the worker who was in an inebriated state. He was stabbed twice, once in the back and in the heart. In interviews with acquaintances, Urquiza was described as "not an exemplary landlord" and as one who mistreated his laborers. Urquiza's father, Manuel, sent a telegram on the 13th to Montavon informing of Antonio's murder.

Parra was tried and sentenced to 30 years in prison.

Following his murder, family members and members of the UNS asserted he had been killed under the direct orders of President Cárdenas. Urquiza was declared a martyr by UNS co-founders José Trueba Olivares and Manuel Zermeño Pérez stating he had died for the synarchist cause. Urquiza has since remained an important figure for the National Synarchist Union and is regularly honored at gatherings.

== Personal life ==
Though described as highly intelligent, Urquiza had a stutter and was not regarded as a good orator. Urquiza never spoke at rallies or meetings. This contributed to Urquiza's reluctance to lead the UNS; he did not consider himself suited for the position.

Although members of the UNS typically held fascist or falangist beliefs, Urquiza was noted for being apolitical and did not subscribe to any ideology. He did not show any interest in politics or government and vehemently opposed the UNS becoming a political party as he considered the organization to be civic in nature.

José Antonio Urquiza is part of the prominent and influential Urquiza family based in Querétaro. Members of this family include former governor of Querétaro and architect Antonio Calzada Urquiza. His second cousin, Carlos Campos, was also a prominent member of the UNS.

At the time of his death, Urquiza had given a considerable amount of his personal fortune to the National Synarchist Union.
