= Manuel Torres Bueno =

Mexican politician and lawyer (born 1913)

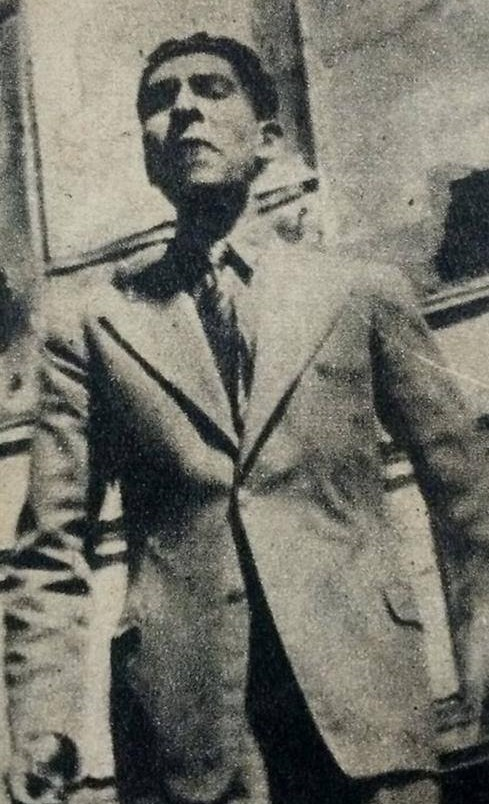

Leader of the National Synarchist Union
- In office 13 December 1941 – 1944
- Preceded by: Salvador Abascal
- Succeeded by: Carlos Athie

Personal details
- Born: November 13, 1913
- Died: Unknown
- Party: National Synarchist Union
- Other political affiliations: Mexican Democratic Party
- Occupation: Lawyer and politician

Manuel Torres Bueno was a Mexican politician, lawyer, and jefe (leader) of the National Synarchist Union. Bueno would lead the organization during the height of its membership and activity. His tenure as leader of the National Synarchist Union was a period of ideological instability which would ultimately lead to the fracture of the organization.

== National Synarchist Union ==
A lawyer by profession, Torres Bueno abandoned his practice in December 1941 after Salvador Abascal selected him as his successor in October. Abascal left the Union to start a sinarquista colony in Baja California. He assumed the position on December 13. As leader he sought to define the movement along more moderate lines than his predecessor. Continuing the themes of anti-communism and opposition to liberal democracy, Torres Bueno argued that fascism and Nazism were equally dangerous to the "Christian Order" that he sought to establish in Mexico. He saw this order, which he also called "Christian democracy" despite its differences from that concept, as being based on a plot of land for each family that had been afforded legal recognition. His comparatively moderate views, as well as Torres Bueno's desire to consider changing the Union into a political party, saw Abascal leave the movement altogether and he was soon joined by the brothers Jose and Alfonso Truebas Olivares, the movement's two leading ideologues.

Under his leadership the UNS fell into disarray and factionalism, even leading to a public fist fight between Torres Bueno and a rival for power, Carlos Athie, in front of the Basilica of Our Lady of Guadalupe in Mexico City. A ban was placed on the movement on 23 June 1944 which also ceased publication of their organ El Sinarquista and Torres Bueno attracted criticism for his lack of resistance to this law.

== Post-UNS ==
He lost power to Athie in early 1945 and soon broke away, heading up his own dissident splinter group. Later that same year he turned leadership of the faction over to his ally Gildardo González Sánchez. Despite having been replaced as leader Torres Bueno received a single write-in vote in the 1946 Presidential election. Torres Bueno was also involved in the creation of the Partido Fuerza Popular as a short-lived political arm of the sinarquista movement.

Although Torres Bueno would drift from politics, the split in the UNS remained in place and indeed has continued to date. The Torres Bueno faction fully politicised in the late 1970s as the Mexican Democratic Party, a group that is now defunct.
