= Gerardo Ulloa Pérez =

Mexican politician

- Born: 29 October 1965 (age 60); Jiquipilas, Chiapas, Mexico
- Occupation: Politician
- Political party: PRD, Morena

Gerardo Ulloa Pérez (Note: In this Mexican name, the surname is Ulloa and the second or maternal family name is Pérez.) (born 29 October 1965) is a Mexican politician. At different times he has been affiliated with the Party of the Democratic Revolution (PRD) and with the National Regeneration Movement (Morena).

In the 2003 mid-terms he was elected to the Chamber of Deputies to represent the State of Mexico's 30th district (Nezahualcóyotl) for the PRD. He was re-elected to Congress in the 2024 general election for the State of Mexico's 29th district (Nezahualcóyotl) on the Morena ticket.

== Family ==
Ulloa Pérez's siblings are also involved in politics: Emilio (born 1964) was elected to Congress for the PRD in the State of Mexico's 29th district in 2006 and is currently active in Morena, while Carlos (born 1970) was elected for Mexico City's 5th district on the Morena ticket in the 2024 election and has close ties to President Claudia Sheinbaum dating back to her time as mayor of Tlalpan.
