= Carlos Ulloa =

Mexican politician from MORENA, born 1970

Ulloa in 2023

Carlos Alberto Ulloa Pérez (Note: In this Mexican name, the surname is Ulloa and the second or maternal family name is Pérez.) (born 21 May 1970) is a Mexican politician affiliated with the National Regeneration Movement (Morena). He has held positions in the government of Mexico City, served in the Chamber of Deputies from 2024 to 2025 and, since 11 April 2025, is the general director of the state-owned company Laboratorios de Biológicos y Reactivos de México (Birmex).

== Biography ==
Carlos Ulloa Pérez was born in Arriaga, Chiapas, in 1970. He holds a degree in administration and a master's in public administration from the Universidad del Valle de México; he has also studied municipal administration in the United Kingdom. His brothers Emilio and Gerardo have also held various public offices, including seats in the Chamber of Deputies.

From 2000 to 2004 he was an advisor to the culture committee of the Chamber of Deputies during the 58th Congress; from 2010 to 2011 he was a research advisor to the National Science and Technology Council (CONACYT); and from 2013 to 2015 he was an advisor to Mexico City's Secretariat of Finance (SAF) during Miguel Ángel Mancera's term as head of government.

In 2015, following her election as mayor of the Mexico City borough of Tlalpan, Claudia Sheinbaum appointed Ulloa to serve as the borough's general director of urban services. He remained in that post until 2017, when he joined Sheinbaum's campaign for head of government in the 2018 city election. Sheinbaum won the election and took office on 5 December 2018; she chose Ulloa to serve as her private secretary, a position he held until 30 December 2020 when he was appointed the head of the Secretariat of Urban Development and Housing of Mexico City (SEDUVI).

On 19 September 2021, Head of Government Sheinbaum appointed him to lead the Secretariat of Inclusion and Social Welfare of Mexico City (SIBISO), where he served until 2 July 2022 when Sheinbaum reappointed him as her secretary of urban development and housing. On 15 June 2023 Sheinbaum resigned as head of government to seek Morena's presidential nomination for the 2024 presidential election; Carlos Ulloa remained as secretary of urban development until 15 February 2024 when he resigned to join Sheinbaum's campaign and to contend in the same election for Mexico City's 5th congressional district (Tlalpan/Xochimilco).

In the 2 June 2024 federal election he was elected to Congress for the 5th district with 53.28% of the vote, defeating the incumbent Karla Ayala Villalobos of the Institutional Revolutionary Party (PRI). He represented the district from 2024 to 2025, chairing the finance and public credit committee and serving on the urban development and housing committees.

On 19 March 2025 he was granted an indefinite leave of absence from his position as deputy (Note: His alternate, Irugami Perea Cruz, was sworn in the same day.) and, on 11 April 2025, President Sheinbaum announced his appointment as head of Laboratorios Biológicos y Reactivos de México (Birmex) – a state-owned manufacturer and distributor of medical supplies – following the dismissal of his predecessor, Iván de Jesús Olmos Cansino, who is under investigation for possible criminal acts.
