= José Hurtado =

José Hurtado may refer to:

- José María Hurtado Ruiz-Tagle, Chilean politician
- José Hurtado (footballer), Ecuadorian footballer
- José Antonio Hurtado Gallegos, Mexican politician
