= Valentín González (disambiguation) =

Valentín González (Valentín González González, 1904–1983) was a Republican military commander during the Spanish Civil War.

Valentín González may also refer to:

- Valentín González (baseball) (1876–????), Cuban baseball player
- Valentín González (athlete) (Valentín González Ávila, 1910–????), Mexican Olympic athlete
- Valentín González Bautista (born 1955), Mexican politician
- Valentín González Formoso (born 1971), Spanish politician
- Estadio Valentín González, a multi-use stadium in Xochimilco, Mexico City
