= Alliet Mariana Bautista =

Mexican politician

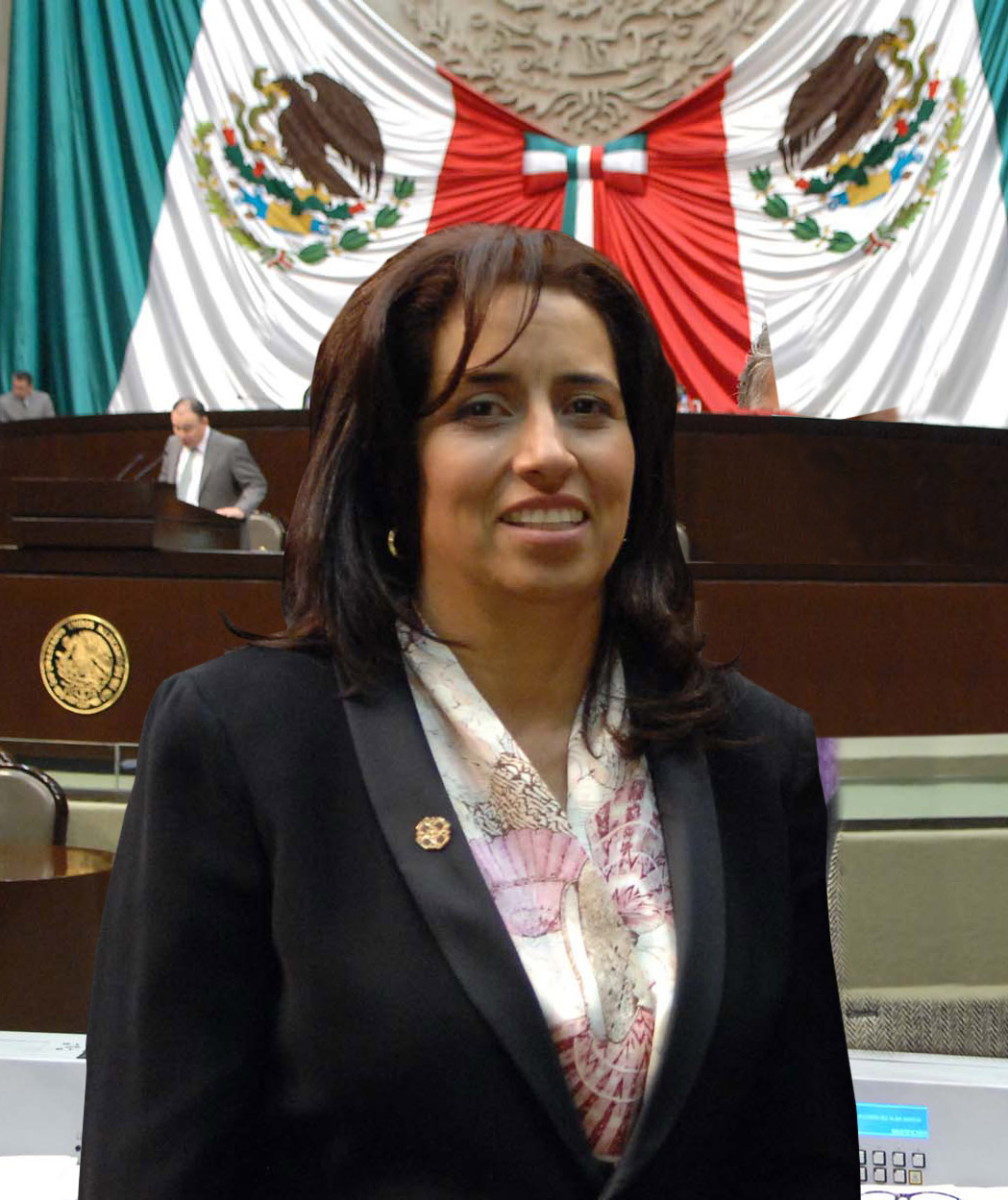
- Bautista in 2012
- Born: 19 January 1968 (age 58); Federal District, Mexico
- Occupation: Politician
- Political party: PRD

Alliet Mariana Bautista Bravo (born 19 January 1968) is a Mexican politician affiliated with the Party of the Democratic Revolution (PRD).

She has been elected to the Chamber of Deputies on two occasions, both times for the State of Mexico's 30th district: in the 2006 general election (60th Congress) and in the 2012 general election (62nd Congress).
