= Héctor Pedroza Jiménez =

Mexican politician

- Born: 26 April 1964 (age 62); State of Mexico, Mexico
- Occupation: Politician
- Political party: PRI

Héctor Pedroza Jiménez (born 26 April 1964) is a Mexican politician from the Institutional Revolutionary Party (PRI). In the 2009 mid-terms he was elected to the Chamber of Deputies to represent the State of Mexico's 29th district during the 61st session of Congress.
