= Patricia Elena Aceves Pastrana =

Mexican politician

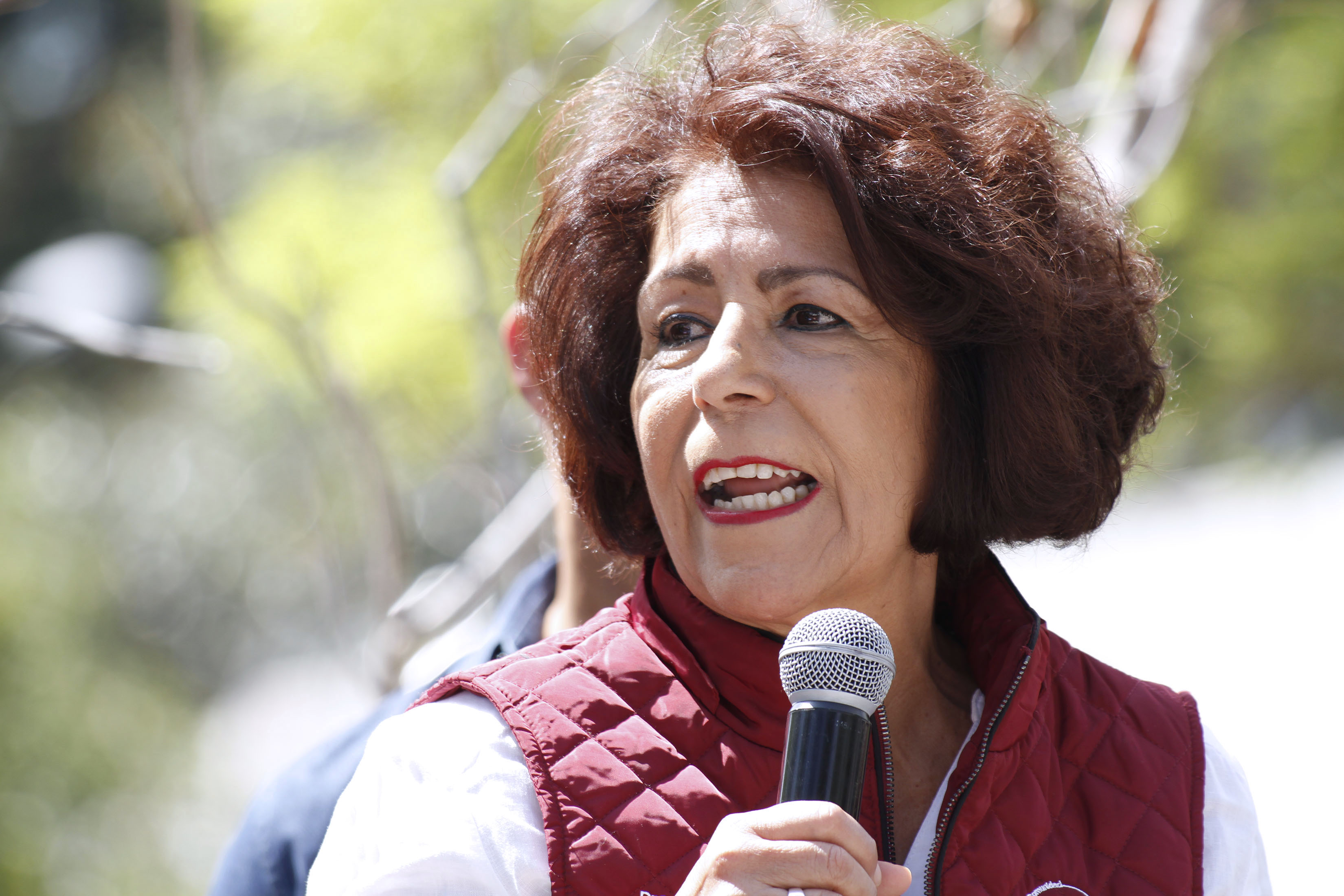
Patricia Elena Aceves Pastrana

Patricia Elena Aceves Pastrana (born April 9, 1948) is a Mexican politician, member of the National Regeneration Movement party (MORENA). Born in Minatitlán, Veracruz, she served as a federal deputy in the 63rd Congress (2015–2018), representing Mexico City's fifth district, and as the mayor of Tlalpan from 2018 to 2021. She was rector of the Metropolitan Autonomous University (UAM).

== Academic life ==
She studied Pharmaceutical Chemistry and Biology (1965-1969), then completed a master's degree in History of Mexico, and finally received her PhD in Organic Chemistry from the Claude Bernard University in Lyon, France. In 2000 she received an honorary doctorate from the Complutense University of Madrid. She was a professor at Metropolitan Autonomous University (UAM) as well as at the Faculty of Philosophy and Letters of the UNAM. She is currently a member of the National System of Researchers.

== Political career ==
Her political career began in 2012, within the National Regeneration Movement party (MORENA).
