= Omar Rodríguez Cisneros =

Mexican politician

- Born: 11 November 1959 (age 66); Hidalgo, Mexico
- Occupation: Politician
- Political party: PRI

Omar Rodríguez Cisneros (born 11 November 1959) is a Mexican politician from the Institutional Revolutionary Party (PRI). In the 2009 mid-terms he was elected to the Chamber of Deputies to represent the State of Mexico's 30th district during the 61st session of Congress.
