= Francisco Javier Carrillo Soberón =

Mexican architect and politician

- Born: 10 August 1951 (age 74); State of Mexico, Mexico
- Occupations: Architect and politician
- Political party: PRD

Francisco Javier Carrillo Soberón (born 10 August 1951) is a Mexican architect and politician affiliated with the Party of the Democratic Revolution (PRD). In the 2003 mid-terms, he was elected to the Chamber of Deputies to represent the Federal District's 5th electoral district during the 59th session of Congress.
