= Mexican Democratic Party (1946) =

Short-lived conservative Catholic political party in Mexico

The Mexican Democratic Party (Spanish: Partido Democrático Mexicano; PDM) was a short-lived conservative Catholic party in Mexico founded on April 1, 1946 by former Foreign Minister Ezequiel Padilla as a PRI splinter to contest the 1946 general election, before losing its legal registration and dissolving by early 1947.
