= Raquel Cortés López =

Mexican politician

- Born: 17 July 1956 (age 69); Mexico City, Mexico
- Occupation: Politician
- Political party: PRD

Raquel Cortés López (born 17 July 1957) is a Mexican politician from the Party of the Democratic Revolution (PRD). In the 2000 general election she was elected to the Chamber of Deputies to represent the State of Mexico's 30th district during the 58th session of Congress.
