= César Daniel González Madruga =

Mexican politician

- Born: 6 September 1984 (age 41); Mexico City, Mexico
- Occupation: Politician
- Political party: free

César Daniel González Madruga (born 6 September 1984) is a Mexican politician from the National Action Party (PAN). From 2009 to 2012 he served in the Chamber of Deputies, representing the Federal District's 5th electoral district during the 61st Congress.
