= Carlos Abascal =

Mexican lawyer and politician (1949–2008)

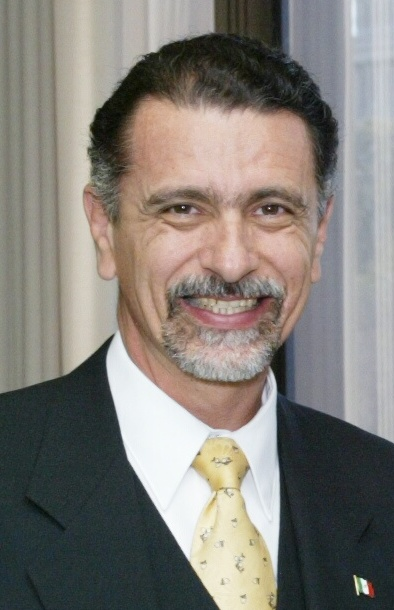
- Abascal in 2003

Secretary of the Interior of Mexico
- In office June 1, 2005 – November 30, 2006
- President: Vicente Fox
- Preceded by: Santiago Creel
- Succeeded by: Francisco Ramírez Acuña

Secretary of Labor of Mexico
- In office December 1, 2000 – June 1, 2005
- Preceded by: Mariano Palacios Alcocer
- Succeeded by: Francisco Javier Salazar

Personal details
- Born: May 14, 1949 Mexico City, Mexico
- Died: December 2, 2008 (aged 59) Mexico City, Mexico
- Party: National Action Party
- Education: Escuela Libre de Derecho
- Profession: Lawyer; Politician

Carlos María Abascal Carranza (Ciudad de Mexico June 14, 1949 – Ciudad de Mexico December 2, 2008), who was known as Carlos Abascal, was a Mexican lawyer, business leader, and politician. He was also the Secretary of the Interior in the cabinet of Vicente Fox and the son of the writer Salvador Abascal, famous for his synarchist ideas.

== Early life and education ==
Abascal studied law at Escuela Libre de Derecho in Mexico City, graduating in 1973 with a thesis entitled "Relations between Spiritual Power and Temporal Power", in which he stated, that "democracy is a farce that has been used by Freemasons in Mexico...to make a confused and disoriented majority believe that its will is being done". He later pursued business management studies at the IPADE.

== Biography and Career ==
Abascal began his career as a messenger for Afianzadora Insurgentes and became a trainee in the legal area. He later became Director and CEO. He worked for Afianzadora Insurgentes for thirty years before retiring in August 2000.

Abascal has occupied different positions in private and social organizations. He has been president of the Fundación para el Desarrollo Sostenible en México (FUNDES), president of Vertebra, president of the Movimiento Social y de Administración de Valores (AVAL), vice president of the Instituto Mexicano de Doctrina Social Cristiana (IMDOSOC), and national president of the Confederación Patronal de la República Mexicana (COPARMEX). As president, he promoted the New Labor Culture and facilitated dialogue between the employer and worker sectors.

Abascal served in the Legislative Assembly of the Federal District from 1994 to 1997. He also participated in the transition team of President Vicente Fox. He became one of the key cabinet members in Fox's administration. He served as the head of the Ministry of Labor and later the Ministry of the Interior. His primary challenge in the latter role was maintaining the country's governability during the 2006 electoral process. In 2000 Fox appointed Abascal as Secretary of Labor. In 2005, following Santiago Creel's resignation, Abascal was appointed Secretary of the Interior.

He was opposed to some birth control methods such as abortion and the contraceptive pill. He spoke out against "liberal" literature, including the novel Aura by Carlos Fuentes, which Abascal alleged was inappropriate for his 13-year-old daughter and requested that her private school reconsider including in its curriculum.

In the later years of his life, he was involved with the National Executive Committee of the National Action Party (PAN) and led the Rafael Preciado Hernández Foundation. Days before his death, he received an Honorary Doctorate from Universidad Anáhuac, marking his final public appearance.

=== Death ===
Abascal died of gastric cancer on the morning of December 2, 2008.

== Canonization ==
In 2009, various Catholic organizations asked the Roman Catholic Archdiocese of Mexico to begin the process for the canonization of Abascal given his virtues and his ability to participate in politics without renouncing his Catholic values.

Political offices
Preceded by Santiago Creel	Secretary of the Interior; 2005–2006	Succeeded by Francisco Javier Ramírez Acuña
Preceded by Mariano Palacios	Secretary of Labor; 2000–2005	Succeeded by Francisco Javier Salazar
