= Ignacio González Gollaz =

Mexican politician (1929–2019)

- Born: 14 October 1924; Amatitán, Jalisco, Mexico
- Died: 24 January 2019 (aged 94); San Luis Potosi, Mexico
- Education: National Autonomous University of Mexico
- Occupation: Politician
- Years active: 1942–1991
- Political party: Mexican Democratic Party
- Movement: National Synarchist Union
- Spouse: Catalina G. González
- Children: 11

Ignacio González Gollaz (Note: In this Mexican name, the surname is González and the second or maternal family name is Gollaz.) (14 October 1924 – 24 January 2019) was a Mexican politician and businessman. He was the founder of the Mexican Democratic Party (PDM) and a presidential candidate in the 1982 general election, in which he received 1.85% of the popular vote.

== Early life and career ==
Ignacio González Gollaz was born on 14 October 1924 in Amatitán, Jalisco, (Note: Other sources give 17 October.) into a family with strong Catholic and conservative values. His early education took place under the guidance of Jesuit priests in Guadalajara, where he became involved in the Catholic Action of Mexican Youth movement that shaped his lifelong commitment to Catholic activism.

In 1942, Gollaz joined the National Synarchist Union (UNS), He quickly rose to prominence as a youth leader within the UNS, organizing protests and mobilizing young Catholics to challenge the dominance of the Institutional Revolutionary Party (PRI).

He studied law at the National Autonomous University of Mexico (UNAM).

=== Political involvement ===
In 1950, Gollaz moved to San Luis Potosí, it was during this time In 1954, Gollaz became director-general of the UNS, a position he held until 1975. During his tenure, he focused on expanding the organization’s influence and advocating for political reforms aligned with Catholic principles.

One of his most significant contributions was his opposition to the lingering political influence of Gonzalo N. Santos, the former governor of San Luis Potosí (1943–1949). Despite leaving office, Santos retained control over local politics as a cacique, enforcing authoritarian rule and repressing opposition. Gollaz led protests and movements to denounce corruption and caciquismo in San Luis Potosi during the 1950s. His activism coincided with broader reform movements, including those led by Dr. Salvador Nava, a prominent reformist and critic of Santos.
