= National Synarchist Union =

National Synarchist Union Unión Nacional Sinarquista
- Abbreviation: UNS
- Historic leaders: Salvador Abascal; Manuel Torres Bueno
- Founder: José Antonio Urquiza (Note: Along with many other radical Catholic activists, Juan Ignacio Padilla, Jesús Hernández Alcalá and José Antonio Urquiza co-founded the far-right National Synarchist Union (UNS). However, Urquiza had given a considerable amount of his fortune to the organization and heavily financed the group's early activities and growth.)
- Founded: 23 May 1937; 89 years ago
- Headquarters: León, Guanajuato
- Newspaper: El Sinarquista
- Youth wing: Juventudes Sinarquistas
- Women's wing: Sección Femenina
- Membership: 500,000 (1940 est.)
- Ideology: Mexican synarchism: Integral nationalism; National conservatism; Corporate statism; Political Catholicism; Internal faction: National syndicalism
- Political position: Far-right
- Religion: Roman Catholicism
- National affiliations: Popular Force Party (Note: 1945–1948); Mexican Nationalist Party (Note: late 1950s–1961); Mexican Democratic Party (Note: 1975–1997); Social Alliance Party (Note: 1998–2003)
- Colours: Red White Green
- Slogan: Patria, Justicia y Libertad
- Anthem: Fé, Sangre y Victoria ("Faith, Blood and Victory")

Party flag

The National Synarchist Union (Spanish: Unión Nacional Sinarquista) was a Mexican political organization. It was historically a far-right movement, implacably opposed to the policies of the Institutional Revolutionary Party (PRI) and its predecessors that governed Mexico from 1929 to 2000 and from 2012 to 2018. The organization was notably the only explicit right-wing movement in Mexico to garner such nation-wide support and influence during this era. At its peak in 1940, there were approximately 500,000 registered members. Mostly active in the late 1930s and early 1940s, its support for the Axis in World War II damaged its reputation. The organization experienced intense infighting in the mid-1940s which ultimately led to multiple schisms. The organization was dissolved as a political party in 1951 and largely faded into obscurity outside the city of Guanajuato, where it retained some local influence. In the 1980s, the UNS was reconstituted as the Mexican Democratic Party, which held seats in the Chamber of Deputies from 1979 to 1988, peaking at 12 Deputies in the 1982 election but losing its presence in 1988; the Mexican Democratic Party (PDM) dissolved in 1997, though two groups both claiming to be the legitimate UNS continued to exist.

== History ==
=== Formation ===
The UNS was founded in May 1937, during the leftist administration of President Lázaro Cárdenas (1934–40). It was developed by a group of Catholic political activists led by José Antonio Urquiza, who was murdered in April 1938. It was a revival of the Catholic reaction that drove the Cristero War (that ended in 1929), and its core was centred in the Bajío rural bourgeoisie and professional lower middle-class, where Catholicism was very strong. The group published the "Sinarquista Manifesto," opposing the policies of the government of President Lázaro Cárdenas. The Manifesto declared that "it is absolutely necessary that an organization composed of true patriots exists". The group's date of formation, 23 May, is celebrated annually in León, Guanajuato by the UNS membership.

The UNS was led by Salvador Abascal, a hard-liner, from 1940 to 1941 when he stood down in order to set up a synarchist commune in Baja California with the more moderate Manuel Torres Bueno becoming leader. The group was fond of large scale publicity stunts, such as the "takeovers" they launched in Guadalajara, Jalisco and Morelia in 1941. It has been stated that these temporary affairs amounted to little more than symbolic gestures but nonetheless helped to demonstrate the support the UNS enjoyed amongst the peasantry of the Western states.

Synarchist involvement in regional protest groups and political parties was both a reality and a regularly used accusation aimed at discrediting the opposition. The Civic Union of León, one such local party active in the mid-1940s, was dominated by a cadre of synarchists in leadership positions. For example, Austreberto Aragon Maldonado, whose Liga de Resistencia de Usarios del Agua de Oaxaca—a group that supported improvement in the water supply in Oaxaca—enjoyed widespread support in the region, he was regularly denounced by the state government as a synarchist. This occurred despite Maldonado's regular efforts to deny any involvement in the UNS and taking care not to involve himself with any extremist groups. Maldonado was targeted in this way due to the broad-based support his movement enjoyed and the possibility that it could become a focus for wider resistance.

=== Decline ===
The UNS was firmly pro-Axis powers during World War II, and its propaganda increased in this direction following the increase in anti-American feeling engendered in Mexico by the Sleepy Lagoon murder. Government schemes aimed at taming the UNS, notably giving the land in Baja California to Abascal's followers, did not prove a success and soon it was felt by the government that the group had to be controlled. President Manuel Ávila Camacho placed a ban on the UNS holding public meetings in June 1944 at a time when factionalism was dividing the movement. Some radical members went rogue and attempted to assassinate the President. One of them, De La Lama y Rojas, who on 14 April 1944 shot at Camacho and bemoaned the President's survival with the words "I was not able, sadly, to complete my mission". De La Lama y Rojas was shot and killed in police custody soon after the failed attack. The movement split in two in 1945 when Carlos Athie replaced Torres Bueno as the leader. The deposed leader started his own group, and both factions claimed the UNS name. Above all however the group was outmanoeuvred by the policies of the Camacho government, which maintained a policy of openly supporting Catholicism whilst also enacting legislation aimed at improving the lot of the working classes, effectively occupying political space that would normally be associated with critics from the right and left respectively.

=== Revival ===
In 1946 the Torres Bueno faction regrouped as the Popular Force Party (Partido Fuerza Popular). This party was banned in 1949 along with the Mexican Communist Party as part of a wider policy against "extremism". In 1951, however, when it was clear that the more moderate National Action Party (PAN) had become the main party of opposition to the PRI government, the Synarchist leader Juan Ignacio Padilla converted the movement to a non-party one promoting conservative Catholic social doctrine, promoted through co-operatives, credit unions and Catholic trade unions. Nonetheless, the PAN actively sought cooperation with the Sinarquistas as part of its attempts to form a mass movement, and the Synarchist movement was active on behalf of the party during the 1958 election campaigns. The group also established links with Opus Dei, which partially funded the Synarchists in the late 1960s by diverting funds to the Synarchist journal Hoja de Combate.

Synarchism, which had become largely localised to Guanajuato, was revived as a political movement in the 1970s through the Mexican Democratic Party (PDM), whose candidate, Ignacio González Gollaz, polled 1.8 percent of the vote at the 1982 presidential election; in the same year the PDM won 10 seats in the Chamber of Deputies. In midterm elections in 1985, but in the 1988 elections it lost all 12 seats it had held in the Chamber, never to return. The party soon split, with both factions taking up the UNS name once more; in 1994, the rump party polled a dismal 0.4% of the vote; the PDM was formally dissolved by the Federal Electoral Institute in 1997. The split was never ended, and to date, there are two organisations, both calling themselves the Unión Nacional Sinarquista. One has an apparently right-wing orientation, the other is apparently left-wing, but they both have the same philosophical roots. A group of former PDM/UNS organizers sought to organize a new party by the PDM starting in 2013 but have yet to be admitted to the electoral register.

== Ideology ==
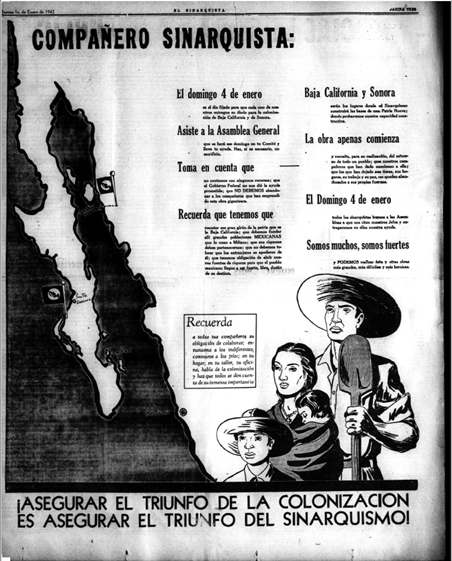
Newspaper article promoting the colonization of María Auxiliadora

The ideology of the UNS derived from the clerical fascism that was a strand of Catholic social thinking of the 1920s and 1930s, based on the papal encyclical Rerum novarum of Pope Leo XIII, which also influenced the regimes of Engelbert Dollfuss in Austria, António de Oliveira Salazar in Portugal and Francisco Franco in Spain. Taking its impetus from the same strand of ultra-conservative Catholicism that had informed the Cristeros, the group sought to mobilise the peasantry against "atheistic and communist tendencies". It stressed social co-operation and corporatism as opposed to the class conflict of socialism, and hierarchy and respect for authority as opposed to liberalism. In the context of Mexican politics, this meant opposition to the centralist, anti-clerical and social democratic policies of the PRI government. As a result, UNS members were denounced as fascists and persecuted by the Cárdenas government and the group's ability to impact Mexican politics was hindered.

=== Hispanism and Catholicism ===
The Synarchists promoted Hispanidad as an identity and spiritual resource to fulfill the Christian social order they longed for and tried to move their nationalism around the Catholic faith and the Hispanic heritage against the Anglo-Saxon culture, which they thought was displacing the core values of Hispanic culture. They sought the political union of Hispanic America in defense of the cultural and religious identities of Hispanic countries against the Good Neighbor policy, which they denounced as "vile Yankee imperialism." The denunciations against the neighboring country were continuous regarding the annexation of half of the territory by the United States, reclaiming what was lost in the Treaty of Guadalupe Hidalgo through a certain irredentism, deploring the freemasonry, liberalism, and Protestantism present within the United States, and criticizing the "materialism" of the North American culture unceasingly as opposed to the Hispanist ideology.

Synarchism sought a new social order that would place Mexico at the head of the Ibero-American countries and establish it as the benchmark of the Ibero-American alliance, adopting an anti-American discourse regarding Pan-Americanism. The geographical condition and the historical past would raise the idea of Mexico as a nation destined to fulfill a historical mission in the universal concert. For Salvador Abascal, Mexico "must be an imperial nation: imperial because of its missionary vocation, because of its vocation to save peoples and nations soul by soul," highlighting the work of Mexican missionaries. He would then argue that "Mexico will only be saved when we all resolve to emulate the spirit of those giant missionaries." The movement's pursuit of the consolidation of a Catholic state, aiming for the conception of organic democracy in rejection of liberal democracy, would also imply the rejection of the currents they believed to be ruling the country, such as socialism and indigenism, which would adversely affect Mexico's Catholic and Hispanic heritage. This would align with other nationalist movements in Hispanic America that would promote Hispanism and social Catholicism as essential elements in their search for a third way.

They considered the conquest as the official birth of the Mexican nation and supported historical revisionism regarding national history, whose liberal heritage they rejected outright. Instead, they saw the echoes of New Spain as the "fertile medieval period in which our races were united in intimate communion with the majesty of the Catholic God," and independence, with the exclusion of the First Mexican Empire, as a process of national decline. The movement was essentially counterrevolutionary. They described the revolution as a disintegrating process present in the American ambassador Joel Poinsett, in the expulsion of the Jesuits in 1767, and in the post-revolutionary governments. On the other hand, Catholicism was the fundamental core of the Synarchist program and sought the destruction of the liberal order to emphasize the return to the "glorious Hispanic, Greco-Latin, and Christian tradition," considering communism and Americanism as threats to its cultural heritage. In this sense, Catholicism was considered "the essence of Mexico," and Hernán Cortés was celebrated as the father of the fatherland to the detriment of Miguel Hidalgo. Several Catholic authors, such as Alfonso Junco, Jesús Guisa y Azevedo, and José Vasconcelos, praised the movement.

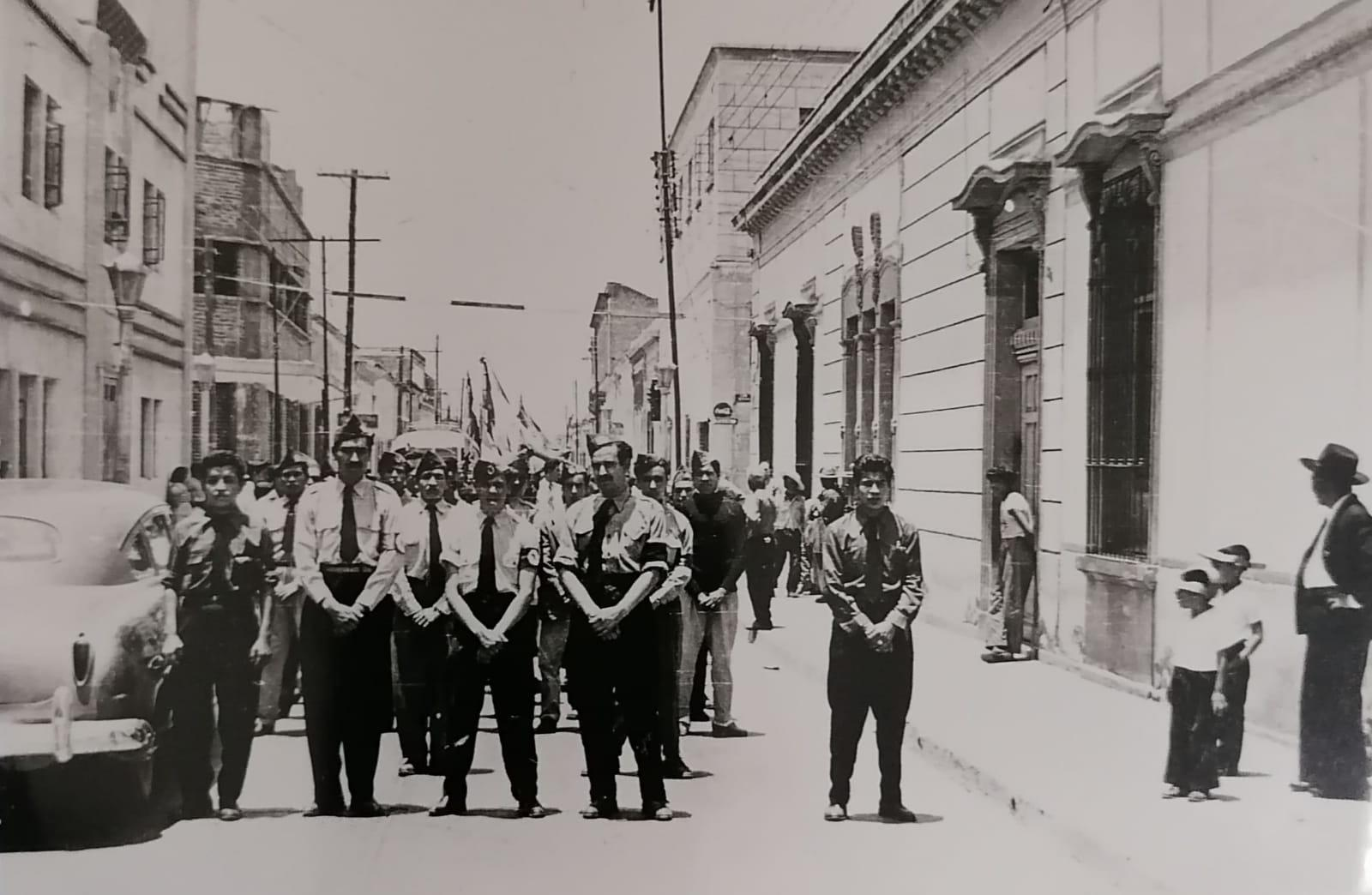
Synarchist militants, circa 1940

Although denounced as fascist by their political adversaries, Synarchism would oppose fascist methods as “pagan and anti-Christian” and stress fascist ideology as incompatible with the national context due to the Roman Catholic identity and the Catholic social teaching, being more closely related to Catholic integralisms. The movement's distancing from fascism did not reduce its misgivings about U.S. governments, and while they emphasized formal neutrality in World War II, they would see a greater threat in U.S. imperialism. Many of them wished for the victory of the Axis, which, according to Salvador Abascal, "would be useful for the Church and Mexico, but its atheistic ideology made it a possible enemy in the future of Synarchism." For Abascal, the Christian social order would also emerge with the victory of Germany and its acquiescence to the reconstitution of the Hispanic world according to its Catholic and corporate tradition. The movement made no secret of its sympathies for authoritarian regimes that governed along similar ideological lines, such as those of António de Oliveira Salazar, Francisco Franco, and Juan Domingo Perón, and opposed the "treacherous forces" that loomed over the countries, such as freemasonry and political parties, and aimed to forge closer ties with similar movements in other countries to "establish throughout the world the Order of Christ."

Embracing its autonomy and denying the influence of European fascist movements, although imitating them in appearance and sharing anti-capitalist and anti-communist foundations, Synarchism would have from its inception a powerful current in favor of the nationalist faction during the Spanish Civil War and the Francoist Spain. Salvador Abascal highlighted his sympathy for the "broad and working class spirit" of José Antonio Primo de Rivera, who led the Spanish Falange of the Councils of the National Syndicalist Offensive, but stated that he did not implant any of his ideas in the movement. However, the references, sympathies, and affinities, with outstanding doctrinal confluences such as Hispanic ecumenism, that would exist among the leaders and the militancy with respect to the Spanish movement would not be few. The UNS would be interested in studying the social basis of the Spanish system, and the women's section national leader Ofelia Ramírez would travel to Spain to participate in women's leadership training courses, directed by Pilar Primo de Rivera. Falangism was considered by Abascal as a "merely current phase of the eternal Spain" and as an "eye for an eye" in response to communism. Although he stressed José Antonio as a "Spanish patriot" and differentiated his movement from fascism and Nazism, the nationalist condition of the Synarchist leaders would usually mark a notable line with respect to Spanish Falangism. Nevertheless, interest in closer relations with the Franco dictatorship would grow within the movement, confirming the ideological affinity it held with Synarchism.

Anti-Judaism was a trait that the UNS shared with European fascist movements. They rejected the entry of Jewish migrants to Mexico, although outstanding leaders such as Alfonso Trueba did not condone the racial persecution of the Jewish diaspora. In the Synarchist discourse, Jews were one of the social groups considered "enemies of the fatherland," and they emphasized Bolshevism and capitalism as doctrines and tendencies that wanted to undermine the Christian tradition in confluence with Judaism. However, Synarchist antisemitism was based on religious principles, unlike the racial one espoused by National Socialism, which posed no possibility of reconciliation. Despite the fact that the Jewish population in Mexico was relatively small, Synarchist leaders deemed the Judeo-Masonic conspiracy thesis to be valid and stressed the threat Jews posed to Christianity. This mentality would influence the Legion of the Archangel Michael, which would also have major convergences with the Synarchist movement. Clemente Gutiérrez Pérez, the leader of the civic faction of the UNS, also pointed out the resemblance. His group would endorse Hispanism, Catholic corporatism, and pro-Francoist views as opposed to the Christian Democratic turn that the political faction of the UNS took since the 1960s, engaging in turn with numerous far-right organizations in Spain.

The United States played a role of influence and pressure on Synarchism to eliminate the radicalism of Salvador Abascal and to seek a less intransigent leadership, since the UNS represented a stumbling block for U.S. external policy. The expansion of Synarchism and its embedded anti-American discourse threatened the interests of the foreign government, leading to Abascal's ousting from the leadership in December 1941 and a partial reorientation of the movement's activity towards a pro-American stance. Notwithstanding this, Synarchists would strongly oppose Mexico's participation in World War II, and the radical sector of the organization would persist in upholding the traditional principles of the UNS, claiming Abascal's leading role in the movement. It took until 1947 for the radical sector to take over leadership and reaffirm its anti-American and anti-government stance, albeit lacking the same strength as in the early forties. It would persist as such throughout the 1950s until its ideological conversion to Christian Democracy, which would provoke a significant number of old-school militants, including the writer and historian Celerino Salmerón.

== In popular culture ==
- In the 1981 Luis Valdez Broadway play Zoot Suit and the film of the same name, one character brings it to the attention of the protagonist that the popular Chicano styles and mannerisms of the day had been pegged as stemming from sinarquismo with sympathies for the Axis powers by the yellow press.
- In John Huston's 1984 film adaptation of the Malcolm Lowry novel Under the Volcano, a sinarquista follows the consul and his family, eventually murdering Albert Finney's character, Geoffrey Firmin.
- The UNS and leader Salvador Abascal feature heavily in James Ellroy's 2019 novel This Storm. They work with Dudley Smith in a heroin-smuggling and sabotage scheme and serve as hosts to both Soviet and Nazi officials in a pre-war meeting.

== See also ==
- Catholic Church in Latin America
- Catholic Church in Mexico
- Anacleto González Flores
- National Catholicism
- FET y de las JONS
- Conservative Party (Mexico)
- Los TECOS
