= Maricela Contreras Julián =

Mexican politician

- Born: 15 June 1961 (age 64); Mexico City, Mexico
- Occupation: Politician
- Political party: PRD, Morena

Maricela Contreras Julián (born 15 June 1961) is a Mexican politician who has been affiliated with both the Party of the Democratic Revolution (PRD) and the National Regeneration Movement (Morena). She represented the fourth electoral region as a plurinominal deputy in the 63rd session of Congress (2015–2018).

== Life ==
Contreras got her start as a finance secretary for communist and socialist parties. At the age of 18, in 1979, she became the finance secretary of the Communist Party of Mexico; when it merged into the Unified Socialist Party of Mexico in 1981, she became its finance secretary, and she also was a founding member of the Mexican Socialist Party in 1986. In 1994, she graduated from the UNAM with a degree in philosophy and letters and served as a research assistant at the Mexican Human Rights Academy and the Mexican branch of the Latin American Faculty of Social Sciences (FLACSO).

In addition to being an alternate local deputy to the first legislature of the Legislative Assembly of the Federal District (ALDF) from 1994 to 1997, Contreras served as the secretary general of the delegation-level PRD in Tlalpan, also running its distance education center. In 1998, she became the women's secretary for the PRD in the Federal District; during her two years in that position, she also ran a home for abused women and vulnerable children in Tlalpan, worked for the Integral Women's Support Center, and represented the PRD on the State Electoral Commission of the Federal District.

In 2000, Contreras was tapped to direct the coordinating board of the System of Integral Women's Support Centers in the Federal District, within the National Women's Institute (INMUJERES), as well as to represent the DF government on the Tlalpan Coordinating Board of Public Security and Pursuit of Justice. From 2002 to 2003, she worked for INMUJERES as a coordinator and planner for the Federal District.

=== Legislative career ===
In 2003, Contreras served as a legislator for the first time, representing the local 37th district in the 3rd session of the ALDF, where she presided over the Gender and Equity Commission. Three years later, she was elected from the Fifth Federal Electoral District of the Federal District to her first term in the federal Chamber of Deputies for the 60th Congress, where she presided over its Gender and Equity Commission and sat on those for Government, Health, and the Center for Gender Equity Studies. In 2009, she returned to the ALDF for its 5th session after again being elected from the 37th local district, presiding over the Health and Social Assistance Commission and sitting on those dealing with Budget and Public Accounts, Human Rights, Equity and Gender, and Culture.

In 2012, voters in Tlalpan elected Contreras as their delegational chief — the highest position in the Tlalpan government. She left the post in April 2015 in order to focus on her election as a proportional representation deputy and was temporarily replaced by Héctor Hugo Hernández, a former federal deputy who had tried to secure the PRD nomination to run for the position but failed to do so.

In 2015, Contreras returned to the Chamber of Deputies as a proportional representation deputy from the fourth region. In May 2016, she became the president of the Special Commission on Gender Crimes; she also sits on those for Tourism, Oversight of the Superior Auditor of the Federation, Center for Gender Equity Studies, and Human Rights. She switched allegiance from the PRD to the National Regeneration Movement (Morena) on 4 September 2017.

Contreras was generally considered as being part of the National Democratic Left (IDN) faction of the PRD.
