= Popular Force Party =

Popular Force Party Partido Fuerza Popular
- Leaders: Gildardo González Sánchez; Jesús A. Castro
- Founded: 1945
- Banned: 1948
- Merged into: Mexican Democratic Party
- Headquarters: León, Guanajuato
- Ideology: Mexican nationalism National syndicalism Social conservatism Clerical fascism Third Positionism
- Political position: Far-right
- Religion: Roman Catholicism

Party flag

The Popular Force Party or People's Force Party (Spanish: Partido Fuerza Popular) was a Mexican political party created in 1945 as the electoral arm of the National Synarchist Union. It participated in the 1946 presidential election, in which it supported the independent Jesús A. Castro.

The party was banned when on December 19, 1948, members of the party decided to put a black hood on the monument of former president Benito Juárez in Mexico City. It continued to enter electoral politics until the 1970s. during the early 1970s, the organizations rearmaments formed and merged into the far-right Mexican Democratic Party.

== Electoral history ==
=== Presidential elections ===
Election year	Candidate	Votes	%	Outcome	Notes
1946	Jesus Agustín Castro	29,338	1.3 #4	Lost	
