= 5th federal electoral district of Mexico City =

Federal electoral district of Mexico

Mexico City's 5th
- Electoral district of the Chamber of Deputies of Mexico

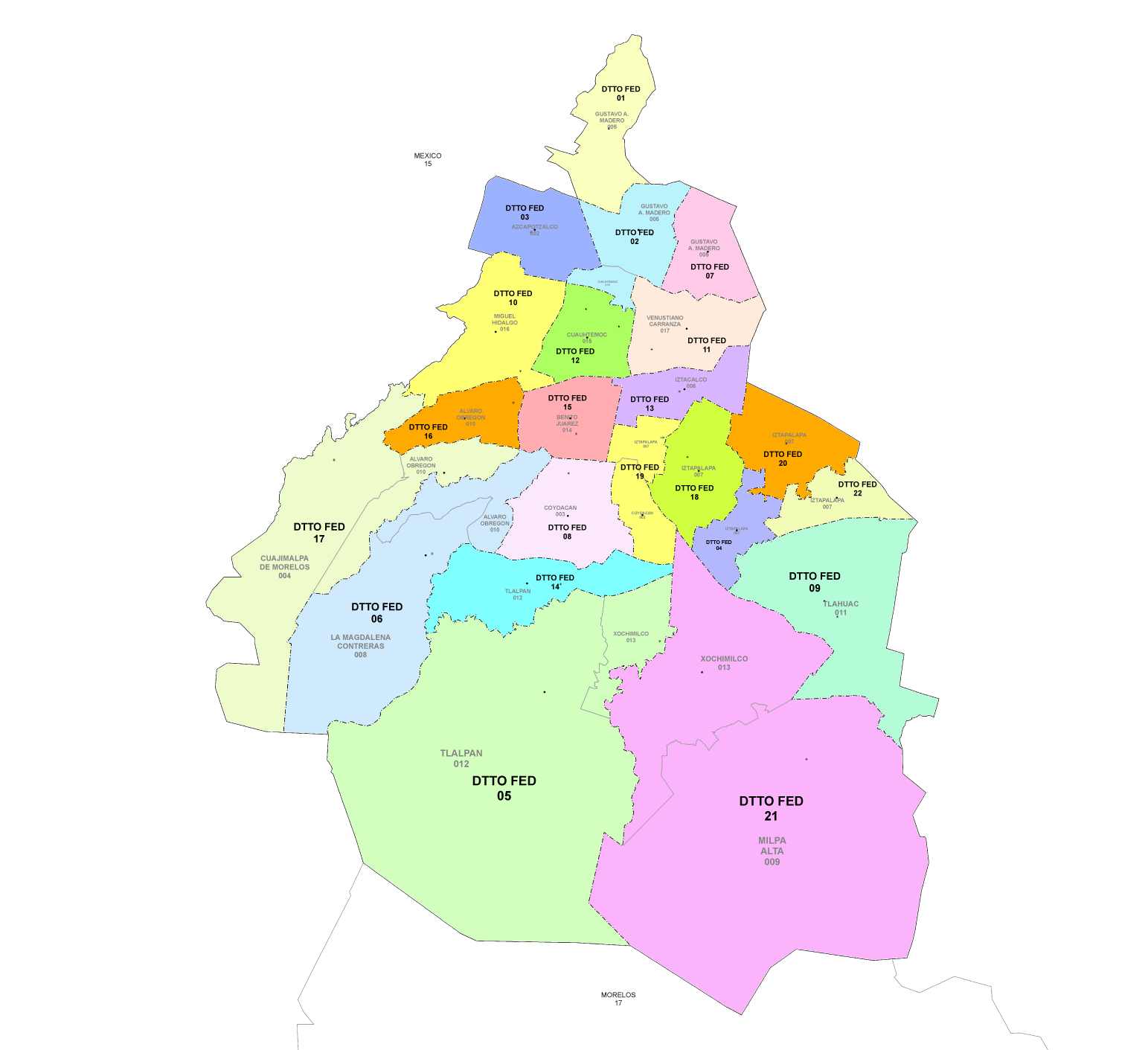
- 5th district since 2023

Incumbent
- Member: Irugami Perea Cruz
- Party: ▌Morena
- Congress: 66th (2024–2027)

District
- State: Mexico City
- Head town: Tlalpan
- Coordinates: 19°18′30″N 99°13′30″W
- Covers: Tlalpan (part), Xochimilco (part)
- PR region: Fourth
- Precincts: 180
- Population: 429,403 (2020 census)

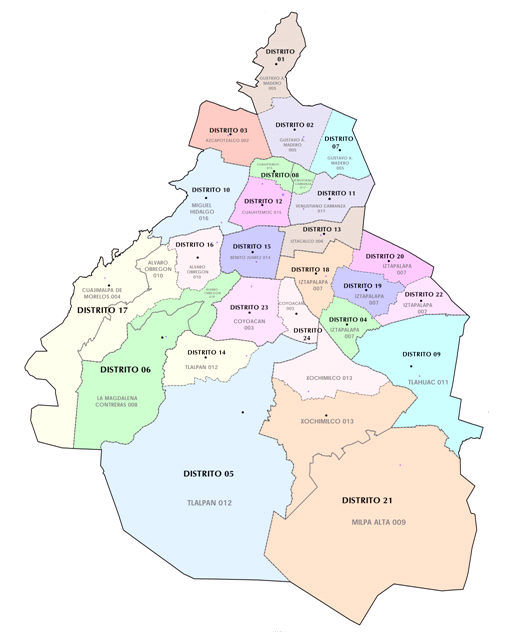
Mexico City under the 2017–2022 districting plan

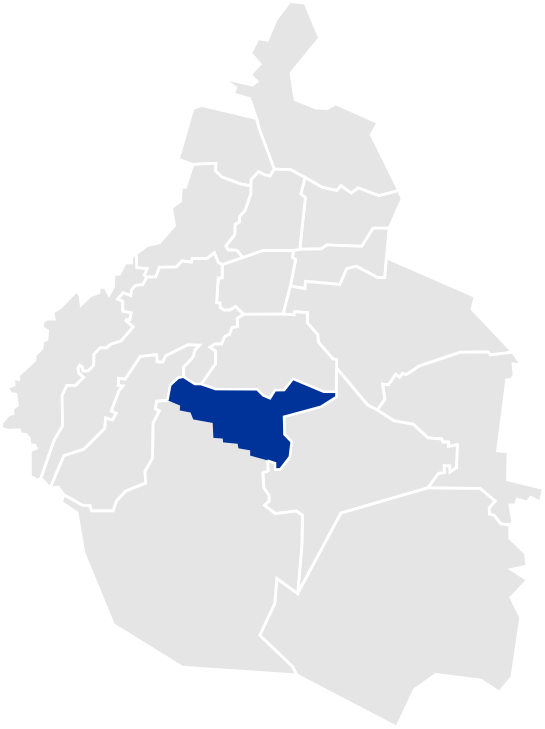
5th district in 2005–2017

The 5th federal electoral district of Mexico City (Spanish: Distrito electoral federal 05 de la Ciudad de México; previously "of the Federal District") is one of the 300 electoral districts into which Mexico is divided for elections to the federal Chamber of Deputies and one of 22 such districts in Mexico City.

It elects one deputy to the lower house of Congress for each three-year legislative session by means of the first-past-the-post system. Votes cast in the district also count towards the calculation of proportional representation ("plurinominal") deputies elected from the fourth region.

Carlos Ulloa Pérez of the National Regeneration Movement (Morena) was elected for the district in the 2024 general election but resigned his seat on 19 March 2025. He was replaced by his alternate, Jesús Irugami Perea Cruz.

== District territory ==
Under the 2023 districting plan adopted by the National Electoral Institute (INE), which is to be used for the 2024, 2027 and 2030 federal elections, the 5th district covers the southern, rural portion of the borough (alcaldía) of Tlalpan down to the border with the state of Morelos, together with the northwestern portion of Xochimilco, for a total of 180 electoral precincts (secciones electorales).

The district reported a population of 429,403 in the 2020 census.

== Previous districting schemes ==
Evolution of electoral district numbers
	1974	1978	1996	2005	2017	2023
Mexico City (Federal District)	27	40	30	27	24	22
Chamber of Deputies	196	300				

2017–2022

Between 2017 and 2022, the 5th district covered the rural south of Tlalpan.

2005–2017

Under the 2005 districting scheme, the district covered the northern portion of Tlalpan (i.e., most of the borough's urban areas).

1996–2005

Between 1996 and 2005, the district covered the northern portion of the borough of Miguel Hidalgo and the west of Azcapotzalco.

1978–1996

The districting scheme in force from 1978 to 1996 was the result of the 1977 electoral reforms, which increased the number of single-member seats in the Chamber of Deputies from 196 to 300. Under that plan, the Federal District's seat allocation rose from 27 to 40. The 5th district covered portions of the boroughs of Cuauhtémoc and Venustiano Carranza in the centre of the city.

== Deputies returned to Congress ==
(Mexico) National parties
- Current
- PAN
- PRI
- PT
- PVEM
- MC
- Morena
- PAZ
- Somos
- Defunct or local only
- PLM
- PNR
- PRM
- PNM
- PP
- PPS
- PARM
- PFCRN
- CON
- PANAL
- PSD
- PES
- PES
- PRD

Mexico City's 5th district
Election	Deputy	Party	Term	Legislature
1916	Félix F. Palavicini		1916–1917	Constituent Congress of Querétaro
1917	Ernesto Aguirre Colorado		1917–1918	27th Congress
1918	Alfredo Rodríguez	PLN	1918–1920	28th Congress
1920	Jesús M. Garza		1920–1922	29th Congress
1922	Luis G. Malváez		1922–1924	30th Congress
1924	Rafael Martínez de Escobar		1924–1926	31st Congress
1926	Samuel O. Yudico		1926–1928	32nd Congress
1928	Arturo de Saracho Valenzuela	PO	1928–1930	33rd Congress
1930	Ismael Salas	Institutional Revolutionary Party	1930–1932	34th Congress
1932	Vicente L. Benéitez	Institutional Revolutionary Party	1932–1934	35th Congress
1934	Víctor Fernández Manero	Institutional Revolutionary Party	1934–1937	36th Congress
1937	Francisco Sotomayor Ruiz	Institutional Revolutionary Party	1937–1940	37th Congress
1940	Carlos M. Orlaineta	Institutional Revolutionary Party	1940–1943	38th Congress
1943	J. Leonardo Flores Vázquez	Institutional Revolutionary Party	1943–1946	49th Congress
1946	Leobardo Wolstano Pineda	Institutional Revolutionary Party	1946–1949	40th Congress
1949	J. Leonardo Flores Vázquez	Institutional Revolutionary Party	1949–1952	41st Congress
1952	José María Ruiz Zavala	Institutional Revolutionary Party	1952–1955	42nd Congress
1955	Alfonso Sánchez Madariaga	Institutional Revolutionary Party	1955–1958	43rd Congress
1958	José María Ruiz Zavala	Institutional Revolutionary Party	1958–1961	44th Congress
1961	Agustín Vivanco Miranda	Institutional Revolutionary Party	1961–1964	45th Congress
1964	Everardo Gámiz Fernández	Institutional Revolutionary Party	1964–1967	46th Congress
1967	Gilberto Aceves Alcocer	Institutional Revolutionary Party	1967–1970	47th Congress
1970	Raúl Gómez Pedroso Suzán	Institutional Revolutionary Party	1970–1973	48th Congress
1973	Hilario Punzo Morales	Institutional Revolutionary Party	1973–1976	49th Congress
1976	Miguel Molina Herrera	Institutional Revolutionary Party	1976–1979	50th Congress
1979	Juan Araiza Cabrales	Institutional Revolutionary Party	1979–1982	51st Congress
1982	Miguel Ángel Morado Garrido	Institutional Revolutionary Party	1982–1985	52nd Congress
1985	Rafael de Jesús Lozano Contreras	Institutional Revolutionary Party	1985–1988	53rd Congress
1988	Ramón Choreño Sánchez	Institutional Revolutionary Party	1988–1991	54th Congress
1991	Filiberto Paniagua García	Institutional Revolutionary Party	1991–1994	55th Congress
1994	Francisco Martínez Rivera	Institutional Revolutionary Party	1994–1997	56th Congress
1997	Fernando Hernández Mendoza	Party of the Democratic Revolution	1997–2000	57th Congress
2000	Jesús López Sandoval	National Action Party (Mexico)	2000–2003	58th Congress
2003	Francisco Javier Carrillo Soberón	Party of the Democratic Revolution	2003–2006	59th Congress
2006	Maricela Contreras Julián	Party of the Democratic Revolution	2006–2009	60th Congress
2009	César González Madruga	National Action Party (Mexico)	2009–2012	61st Congress
2012	José Antonio Hurtado Gallegos	Citizens' Movement (Mexico)	2012–2015	62nd Congress
2015	Patricia Elena Aceves Pastrana	National Regeneration Movement	2015–2018	63rd Congress
2018	Claudia López Rayón	National Regeneration Movement	2018–2021	64th Congress
2021	Karla Ayala Villalobos	Institutional Revolutionary Party	2021–2024	65th Congress
2024	Carlos Ulloa Pérez (Note: Ulloa Pérez took leave from his congressional duties on 19 March 2025; his alternate, Perea Cruz, was sworn in the same day.); Jesús Irugami Perea Cruz	National Regeneration Movement	2024–2025; 2025–2027	66th Congress

== Presidential elections ==
Mexico City's 5th district
Election	District won by	Party or coalition	%
2018	Andrés Manuel López Obrador	Juntos Haremos Historia	56.0761
2024	Claudia Sheinbaum Pardo	Sigamos Haciendo Historia	56.7968
