= Mexican Democratic Party =

Mexican political party

Mexican Democratic Party Partido Demócrata Mexicano
- Founder: Ignacio González Gollaz
- Founded: June 15, 1975
- Registered: 1979
- Dissolved: 1997
- Succeeded by: Social Alliance Party
- Headquarters: Mexico City, Mexico
- Ideology: Mexican synarchism National conservatism Social conservatism National syndicalism Political Catholicism; Neo-fascism
- Political position: Far-right
- Religion: Catholicism
- National affiliation: National Synarchist Union

The Mexican Democratic Party (Spanish: Partido Demócrata Mexicano, PDM, also known as El Partido Gallito Colorado, "The Little Red Rooster Party") was a Catholic social conservative political party in Mexico that existed between 1979 and 1997. At its height in 1982, the party had over 500,000 active voters and 12 seats in the Mexican Chamber of Deputies (Cámara de Diputados).

== History ==
=== Origins ===
Opus Dei and its increasing influence in Mexico during the 1970s contributed to the establishment of the PDM.

The Mexican Democratic Party (PDM) traces its origins to the Manuel Torres Bueno faction of the National Synarchist Union (UNS), a right-wing Catholic and clerical fascist organization. The UNS was founded in 1937 to oppose the anti-Catholic articles of the 1917 Constitution and the secular policies of President Lázaro Cárdenas. Its activities gained significant traction in regions such as Jalisco, Aguascalientes, Querétaro, Guanajuato, and Michoacán—areas that were central to the Cristero War (1926–1929).

Although the UNS declined after the 1940s, it remained influential in local politics, particularly in the Bajío region, known for its strong Catholic traditions. By the 1970s, the UNS experienced a revival due to electoral reforms introducing proportional representation, which allowed smaller political groups to participate in elections. During this period, Catholic organizations such as Opus Dei gained prominence in Mexican society, advocating for greater Catholic influence in politics and education. This cultural and ideological resurgence contributed to the creation of the Mexican Democratic Party (PDM) on June 15, 1975, in Mexico City.

=== Foundation ===
The Mexican Democratic Party was established by former members of the UNS, National Action Party and other right-wing organizations with the goal of creating a pluralistic and democratic society rooted in Catholic values. Key figures, such as Ignacio González Gollaz, were instrumental in its founding and leadership. The PDM sought to formally engage in electoral politics to challenge the dominance of the Institutional Revolutionary Party (PRI) and provide a platform for Catholic conservatives, particularly in rural communities.

Initially, the PDM concentrated on building its support base in the Bajío region, which had historically supported the UNS. This stronghold allowed the party to organize and promote its vision of a society guided by Christian-social principles and rooted in traditional values. By 1979, the PDM achieved official recognition as a political party, marking its entry into national elections and formal politics.

=== Electoral performance and decline ===
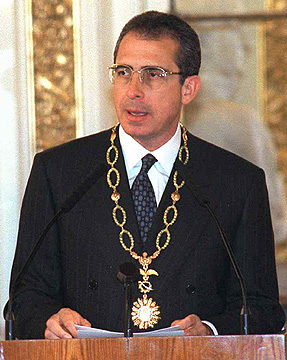
Ernesto Zedillo was the presidential candidate that won the 1994 election, the last time the PDM would participate in an election before it lost its registry.

In the 1979 legislative elections, the PDM gained 10 seats in the Chamber of Deputies. It increased its representation to 12 seats in the 1982 election. It was in the old UNS heartlands that the PDM obtained its greatest electoral presence, prevailing in several important municipalities like Lagos de Moreno in Jalisco or the city of Guanajuato.

Although the PDM managed to gain seats in the Chamber of Deputies, it was a very small opposition party compared to the PAN, having gained only 2.3% of the nationwide vote during the 1982 general election. Even so, if its seat increase from the 1979 congressional election to the 1982 election is considered, the PDM had the second-highest (after the PAN) percentage increase of total votes out of all the political parties in Mexico.

==== Internal divisions ====
Up until the presidential elections of 1988 the party experienced internal divisions that contributed to its decline.

These divisions arose from ideological and strategic disagreements among its members, particularly regarding the direction and political strategy of the party. Some members advocated for a more moderate stance or for alliances with other parties, while others insisted on maintaining a more conservative and autonomous line. These discrepancies weakened the cohesion of the party and made it difficult to develop a unified political agenda.

Additionally, the emergence of new political parties and movements in Mexico during the 1980s, such as the Party of the Democratic Revolution (PRD), attracted voters seeking alternatives to the dominant political system, reducing the PDM’s support base. The party’s failure to adapt to the changing dynamics of Mexico’s political system and its inability to attract new sectors of the population also contributed to its decline.

==== National Opposition Union and dissolution ====
Logo of the National Opposition Union

The National Opposition Union (UNO) was a political coalition formed for the 1994 general election. This alliance was formed by the PDM and included various groups and former members of other parties who shared a conservative vision and sought an alternative to the dominance of the Institutional Revolutionary Party (PRI)

After not gaining 2% of the required votes, it lost its registry and it again recovered it in 1996, but a loss in the 1997 legislative elections dissolved the PDM in late-1997.

Many of their militants and members conformed in 1998 in the newly formed Social Alliance Party, which did not obtain notable political presence in the country either. In 2013, Former party members began laying the basis for the party's re-registration to compete in the 2015 legislative elections. This has not yet been confirmed.

== Ideology ==
The PDM’s ideology was grounded in ultranationalism, religious conservatism, anti-communism, and anti-liberalism. It positioned itself as a defender of Catholicism and traditional Mexican culture, prioritizing religious values in its platform.

Unlike the more moderate National Action Party (PAN), which appealed to urban middle-class voters, the PDM primarily drew support from rural lower-class communities, including farmers and landowners. The party also sought to address the interests of the “petty-bourgeois” rural population by advocating for reforms aimed at correcting perceived injustices in Mexican capitalism.

== Notable members ==
=== Party presidents ===
- Baltazar Ignacio Valdez
- Ignacio González Gollaz
- Víctor Atilano Gómez
- Mariano Gaxiola

=== Presidential candidates ===
- 1982: Ignacio González Gollaz
- 1988: Gumersindo Magaña
- 1994: Pablo Emilio Madero

== Electoral history ==
=== Presidential elections ===
| Election year | Candidate | Votes | % | Outcome | Notes |
|---|---|---|---|---|---|
| 1982 | Ignacio González Gollaz | 433,886 | 1.9 #4 | Lost | |
| 1988 | Gumersindo Magaña Negrete | 199,484 | 1.04 #4 | Lost | |
| 1994 | Pablo Emilio Madero | 97,935 | 0.28 #9 | Lost | |

=== Congressional elections ===
==== Chamber of Deputies ====
| Election year | Constituency | | PR | | # of seats | Position | Presidency | Note |
| Election year | votes | % | votes | % | # of seats | Position | Presidency | Note |
|---|---|---|---|---|---|---|---|---|
| 1979 | 293,540 | 2.3 #5 | | | 10 / 237 | | José López Portillo | |
| 1982 | 534,122 | 2.1 #5 | | | 12 / 400 | | Miguel de la Madrid | |
| 1985 | 507,710 | 2.9 #4 | | | 12 / 400 | | Miguel de la Madrid | |
| 1988 | 244,458 | 1.3 #7 | | | 0 / 500 | | Carlos Salinas de Gortari | |
| 1991 | 276,661 | 1.2 #7 | | | 0 / 500 | | Carlos Salinas de Gortari | |
| 1994 | 151,100 | 0.4 #9 | | | 0 / 500 | | Ernesto Zedillo | |
| 1997 | 193,509 | 0.7 #7 | | | 0 / 500 | | Ernesto Zedillo | |

== See also ==
- Mexican synarchism
- List of political parties in Mexico
