= Gumersindo Magaña =

Mexican politician

- Born: 5 June 1929; Uruapan, Michoacán, Mexico
- Died: 16 April 2013 (aged 73); San Luis Potosí, SLP, Mexico
- Occupation: Politician
- Political party: Mexican Democratic Party

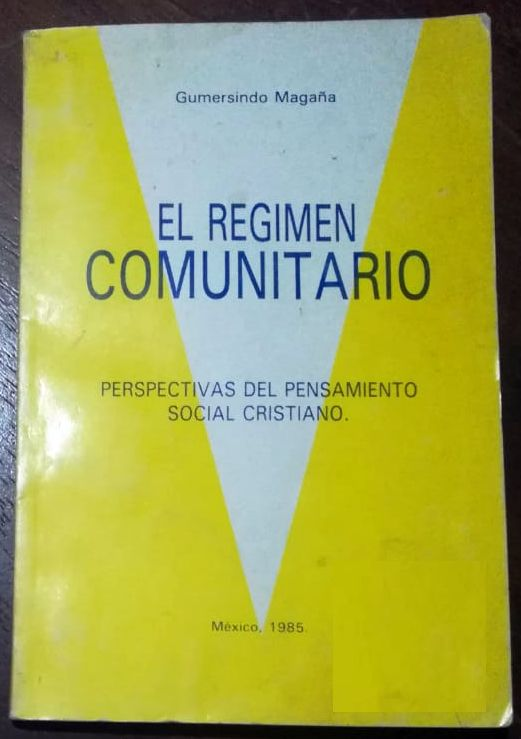
Cover of "The Community Regime. Perspectives of Christian Social Thought", Mexico, 1985. Gumersindo Magaña Negrete.

Gumersindo Magaña Negrete (5 December 1939 – 16 April 2013) was a Mexican politician from Uruapan, Michoacán. A member of the right-wing and now dissolved Mexican Democratic Party (PDM), he was elected to the Chamber of Deputies in the 1979 election.

He later represented his party in the 1988 presidential election, in which faced Carlos Salinas, Cuauhtémoc Cárdenas, Rosario Ibarra and Manuel Clouthier. In spite of the hopes expressed by Magaña during the electoral campaign, his party managed to obtain only 199,484 of the votes (1.04%), a very distant fourth place, causing the party to lose its registration, which it recovered three more times until definitively losing it in the mid-term federal elections of 1997.

Magaña retired from political life in 1988 and was not a registered member of any party. He died in 2013 in the city of San Luis Potosí.
