= Ulloa =

The word Ulloa in the world mostly comes as a gentilic from A Ulloa (and itself from the Ulla River) in Galicia, Spain, later expanded all over the world by emigration and American conquest, and may refer to:

== Maritime ==
- Spanish cruiser Don Antonio de Ulloa, Velasco-class cruiser

== Natural history ==
- Turbonilla ulloa, species of sea snail

== Places ==
- A Ulloa, region in Galicia, Spain
- Twin Islands (British Columbia), Canada, formerly known as the Ulloa Islands
- Ulloa, Valle del Cauca, municipality in Colombia
- Ulloa Street, a street name in New Orleans, Louisiana
- Ulloa Street, a street name in San Francisco, California

== Persons with the surname ==
- Alfonso de Ulloa (1529 – 1570) - Spaniard active in Venice translating works from Spanish to Italian, including biography of Columbus
- Antonio de Ulloa (1716–1795), Spanish general, explorer, author, astronomer, colonial administrator
- Augusto Ulloa y Castañón (1823–1879), Spanish lawyer, politician, journalist
- Berny Ulloa Morera (born 1950), Costa Rican football referee
- Carlos Ramírez Ulloa (1903–1980), Mexican civil engineer
- Cynthia Calderón (born 1988), Peruvian model
- Edward Ulloa (born 1962), American attorney, criminal prosecutor
- Emilio Ulloa (born 1952), Chilean long-distance runner
- Fabio Ulloa (born 1976), Honduran footballer
- Félix Ulloa (born 1951), Vice President of El Salvador
- Fernando Cepeda Ulloa (born 1938), Colombian political scientist, professor, diplomat
- Francisco Ulloa (accordionist), Dominican Republic accordionist
- Francisco de Ulloa (died 1540), Spanish explorer
- Gerardo Ulloa Pérez (born 1965), Mexican politician
- Hilario Ulloa, Nicaraguan politician
- Ignacio Ulloa Rubio (born 1967), Spanish judge
- Jose Domingo Ulloa Mendieta (born 1956), Panamanian clergy
- José Francisco Ulloa (born 1940), Costa Rican clergy
- Juanma Bajo Ulloa (born 1967), Spanish Basque film director
- Leonardo Ulloa (born 1986), Argentine footballer
- Manuel Ulloa Elías (1922–1992), Peruvian politician, economist
- Óscar Ulloa (born 1986), Salvadoran footballer
- Pedro Osores de Ulloa (1554–1624), Spanish Governor of Chile
- Ricardo Ulloa (born 1990), Salvadoran footballer
- Roberto Ulloa (1924–2020), Argentinian politician
- Rudy Ulloa (born 1960), Argentinian politician, businessman, media entrepreneur
- Tristán Ulloa (born 1970), Spanish actor, writer, director
- Victor Ulloa (footballer, born 1992) (born 1992), American footballer
- Víctor Ulloa (Peruvian footballer) (born 1991), Peruvian footballer
