= José Antonio Hurtado Gallegos =

Mexican politician and lawyer

- Born: 13 June 1955 (age 70); Iztacalco, Federal District, Mexico
- Occupations: Deputy and lawyer
- Political party: MC

José Antonio Hurtado Gallegos (born 13 June 1955) is a Mexican politician affiliated with the Convergence party (later renamed the Citizens' Movement). In 2012–2015 he served as a federal deputy in the 62nd Congress, representing the Federal District's fifth district.
