= Valentín González Bautista =

Mexican politician

- Born: 3 November 1955 (age 70); Teposcolula, Oaxaca, Mexico
- Occupation: Deputy
- Political party: MORENA
- Website: http://valentingonzalez.mx

Valentín González Bautista (born 3 November 1955) is a Mexican politician affiliated with the Party of the Democratic Revolution (PRD).

He has been elected to the Chamber of Deputies for the State of Mexico's 29th district twice: in the 2003 mid-terms (59th Congress), and in the 2012 general election (62nd Congress).

He also served as a local deputy in the 54th session of the Congress of the State of Mexico. He was also municipal president of Nezahualcóyotl from 1997 to 2000.
