= Salvador Abascal =

Mexican politician (1910–2000)

Salvador Abascal Infante
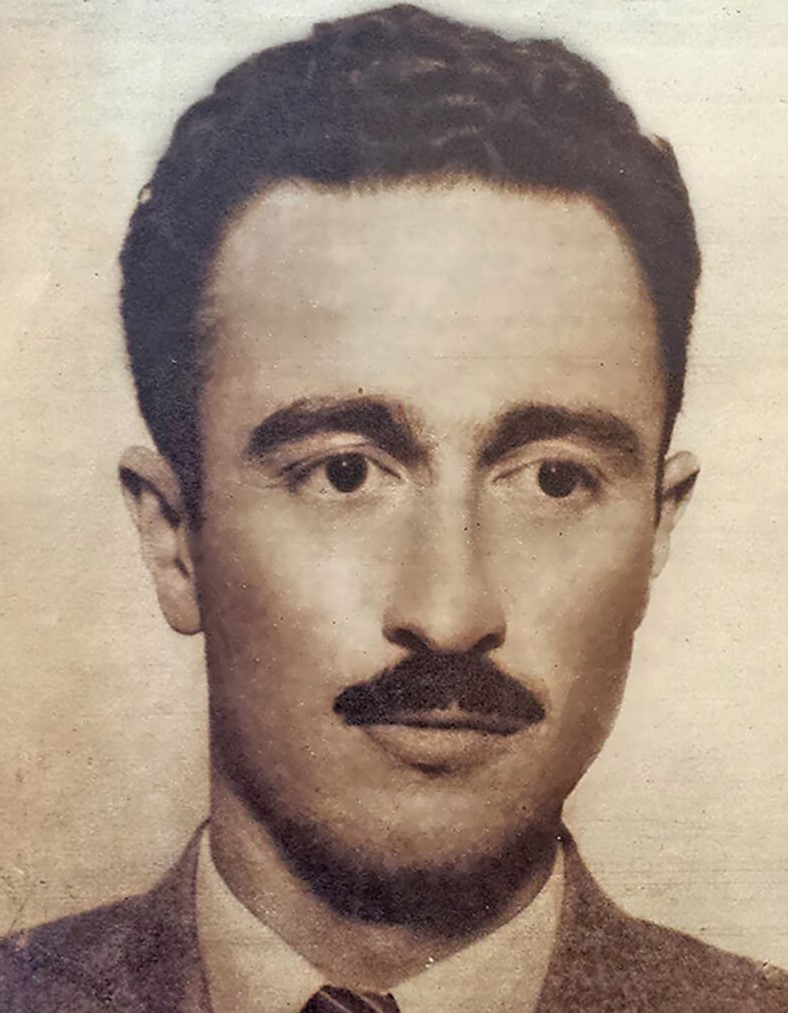
- Abascal, c. 1940

Leader of the National Synarchist Union
- In office 1940–1941
- Preceded by: Manuel Zermeño
- Succeeded by: Manuel Torres Bueno

Personal details
- Born: 18 May 1910 Morelia, Mexico
- Died: 30 March 2000 (aged 89) Mexico City, Mexico
- Party: National Synarchist Union
- Spouse: Maria Guadalupe Carranza Pulido (m. 1942)
- Children: 12, including: Salvador Abascal Carranza; Carlos María Abascal; Juan Bosco Abascal Carranza
- Education: Universidad Michoacana de San Nicolás de Hidalgo

Salvador Abascal Infante (18 May 1910 – 30 March 2000) was a Mexican politician and leading exponent of Mexican synarchism. For a time, he was the leader of the National Synarchist Union (UNS). Abascal represented the orthodox Catholic tendency within the movement.

== Background ==
Born in Morelia into a landowning family, Abascal was the fourth of eleven children. Partly educated at a seminary, Abascal was sympathetic to the Cristeros from an early age. Indeed, his father was a member of the Popular Union, the Cristero party. As a result of these sympathies Abascal passed through a variety of Roman Catholic counterrevolutionary organisations during the 1930s.

He would complete his education at the Universidad Michoacana de San Nicolás de Hidalgo where he graduated with a law degree in 1931, subsequently serving as a judge in Ayutla. He was dismissed as a judge in 1933 after falling foul of local bosses when he made judgements in favour of claimants to land.

== UNS leadership ==
He was a founder member of the UNS in 1937 and became an organiser in Michoacán, before taking full charge of the movement in 1940 when it was at its peak with 500,000 members. Abascal succeeded Manuel Zermeño as leader, after Zermeño was removed from the movement for concluding an agreement with the government of Avila Camacho without securing approval of the UNS membership.

Accused of Nazism by opponents, Abascal officially denounced the system, although he was noted for his anti-Semitism. He was also noted for his opposition to electoral politics and rejected any attempts to convert the UNS into a political party. Instead Abascal called for 'Catholic social order' as the antithesis to his two most hated ideologies - Marxism and liberal democracy - both of which he felt were closely related. He also resisted attempts by Manuel Gómez Morín to fuse the UNS with the National Action Party in 1939 as a result of these convictions.

== Commune ==
An unpopular figure with moderates, he was replaced as leader by Manuel Torres Bueno in 1941 and left to set up a sinarquista commune in Baja California. The colony, known as Maria Auxiliadora, was initially made up of some 86 families (450 people). It has been claimed that Abascal, who stated that he was inspired by God and Thomas Aquinas in his actions, was driven by Millenarianism in leading his followers into what was a hostile desert climate. However the scheme proved unsuccessful, and by 1944, Abascal had been expelled from the sinarquista movement for clashing with its leadership over the failure of the colonisation.

== Later years ==
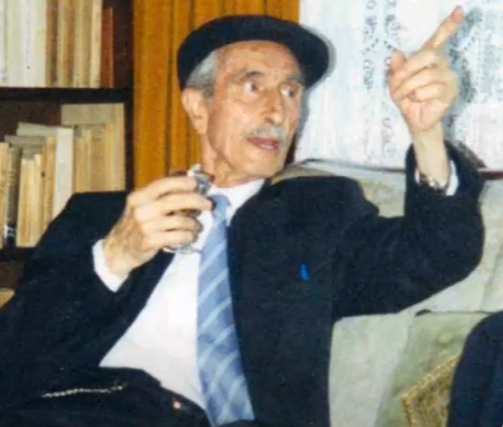
Abascal, c. late-1990s

He returned in 1947 and became something of a grand old figure in the movement, even being considered as a potential candidate for the presidency in 1955 (although he declined the offer). Increasingly drawn towards integralism, he set up the publishing house Editorial la Tradition in the late 1970s to produce works on this subject, as well as his memoirs Mis Recuerdos. He published his own newsletter, La Hoja del Combate, into the 1990s. The publication was noted for giving space to the ideas of the revisionist writer Salvador Borrego.

== Personal life ==
At 31, Abascal met 16-year-old Maria Guadalupe Carranza Pulido while in Los Angeles in 1940. They developed a courtship that lasted two years. They married on 17 March 1942, on the Sinarquist commune María Auxiliadora.

Abascal had 12 children in total. Their first born son, born on the sinarquist commune on 11 March 1943, was Juan Bosco Abascal Carranza. Juan Bosco would go on to be a professor of psychology, published author and a YouTube personality. Their second born, the late Carlos Abascal, was the Secretary of the Interior in the government of Vicente Fox whilst another son, Salvador Abascal Carranza also followed a career in politics, serving as a federal deputy from 1991 to 1994, both for the National Action Party.
