= 1946 Mexican general election =

7 July 1946
- Presidential election
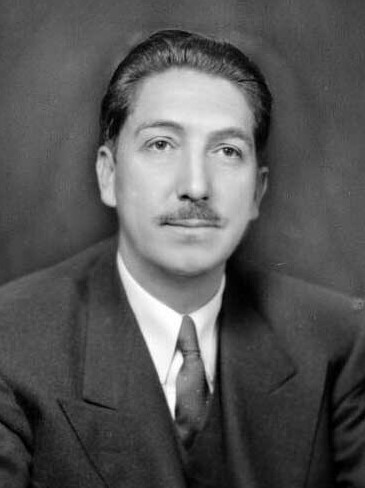

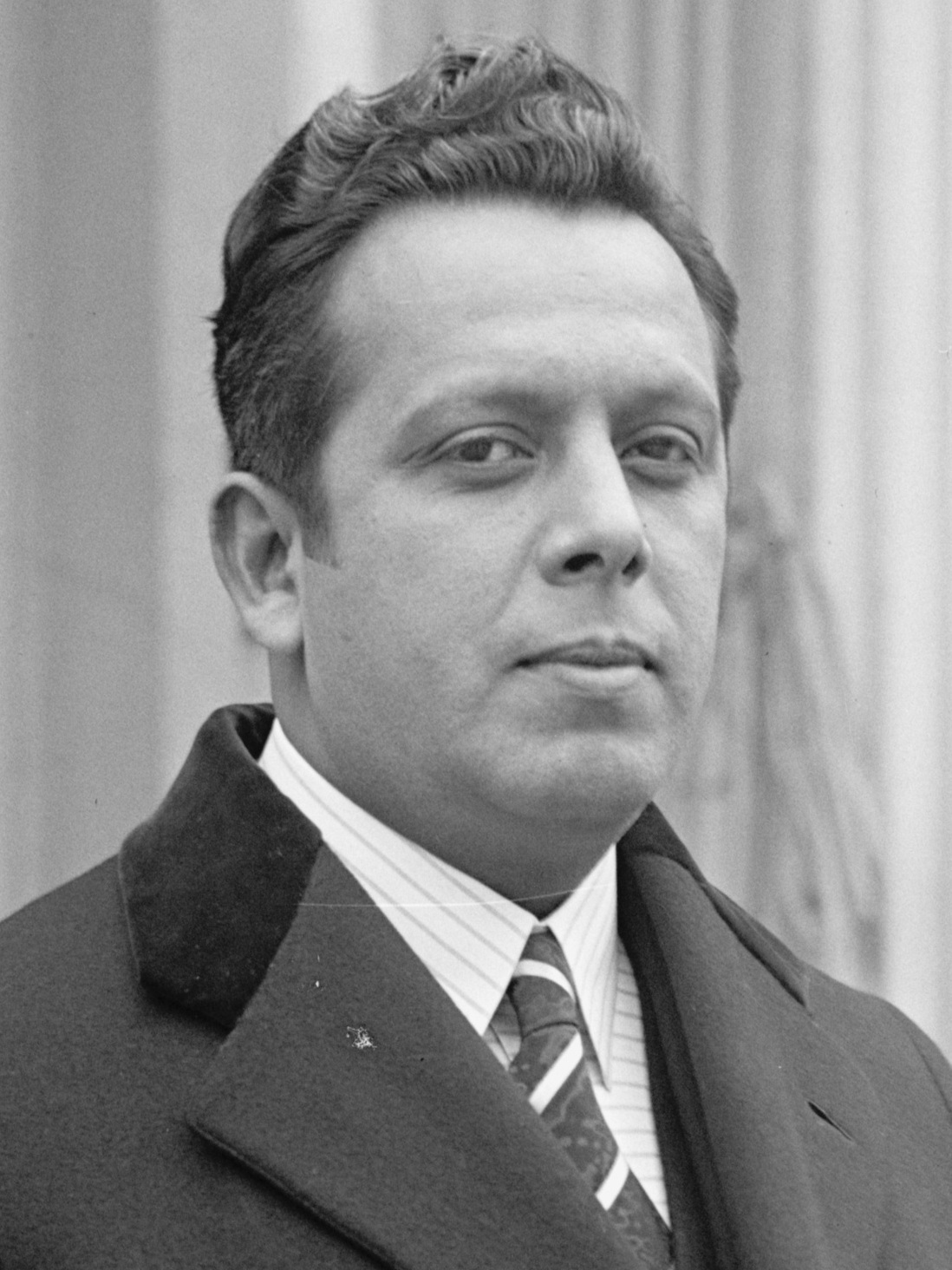
Nominee	Miguel Alemán Valdés	Ezequiel Padilla Peñaloza
Party	PRI	PDM
Popular vote	1,786,901	443,357
Percentage	77.87%	19.32%
President before election
Manuel Ávila Camacho
PRI
Elected President
Miguel Alemán Valdés
PRI

General elections were held in Mexico on 7 July 1946. The presidential elections were won by Miguel Alemán Valdés, who received 77.9% of the vote. In the Chamber of Deputies election, the Institutional Revolutionary Party won 141 of the 147 seats.

== Background ==
With the establishment of the Federal Electoral Law of 1946, three political parties were registered: the National Action Party (PAN), the Mexican Democratic Party (PDM) and the Institutional Revolutionary Party (PRI), with the latter being a successor of the Party of the Mexican Revolution.

To better establish control over the various factions within the party, President Manuel Ávila Camacho sought greater worker discipline and strengthened the popular side of the party in the same year that he restructured the official one by eliminating the military sector, in order to prevent internal conflicts prior to voting as had occurred with Juan Andreu Almazán during the general elections of 1940.

Likewise, the PRI was experiencing a generational shift as a result of the militants' aging from their revolutionary struggle training. As a result, they were obliged to hand over positions of authority to people with university education.

== Results ==
=== President ===
Candidate	Party	Votes	%
Miguel Alemán Valdés	Institutional Revolutionary Party	1,786,901	77.87
Ezequiel Padilla Peñaloza	Mexican Democratic Party	443,357	19.32
Carlos Calderón	Revolutionary National Claim-Laying Popular Party	33,952	1.48
Jesus Agustín Castro	National Constitutionalist Party	29,337	1.28
Other candidates		1,181	0.05
Total		2,294,728	100.00
Registered voters/turnout		2,556,949	–
Source: Nohlen

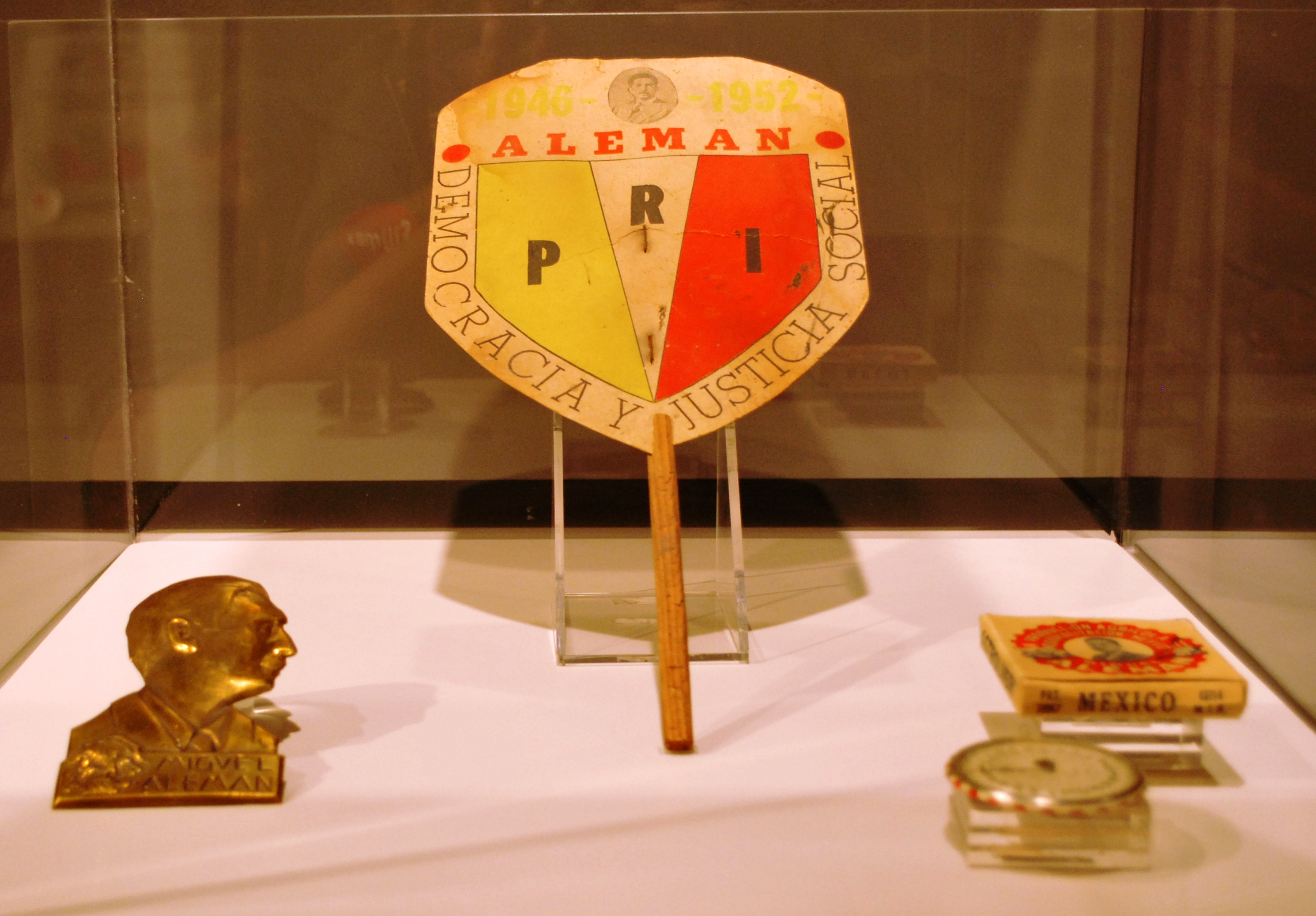
Miguel Alemán campaign items.

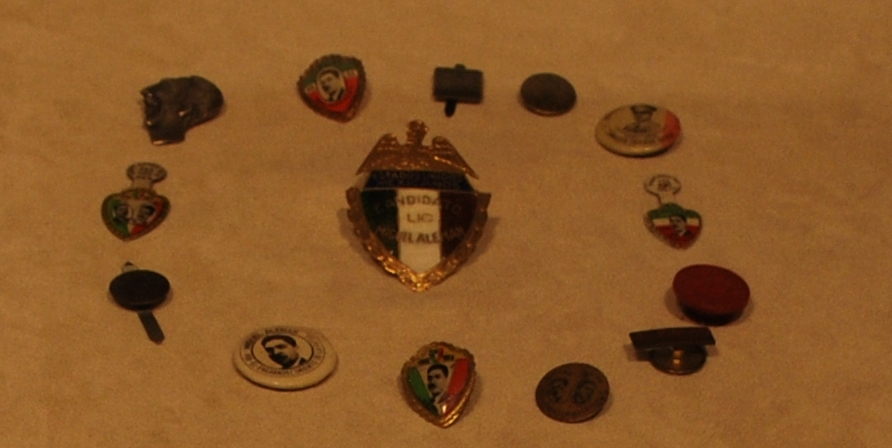
Miguel Alemán campaign buttons.

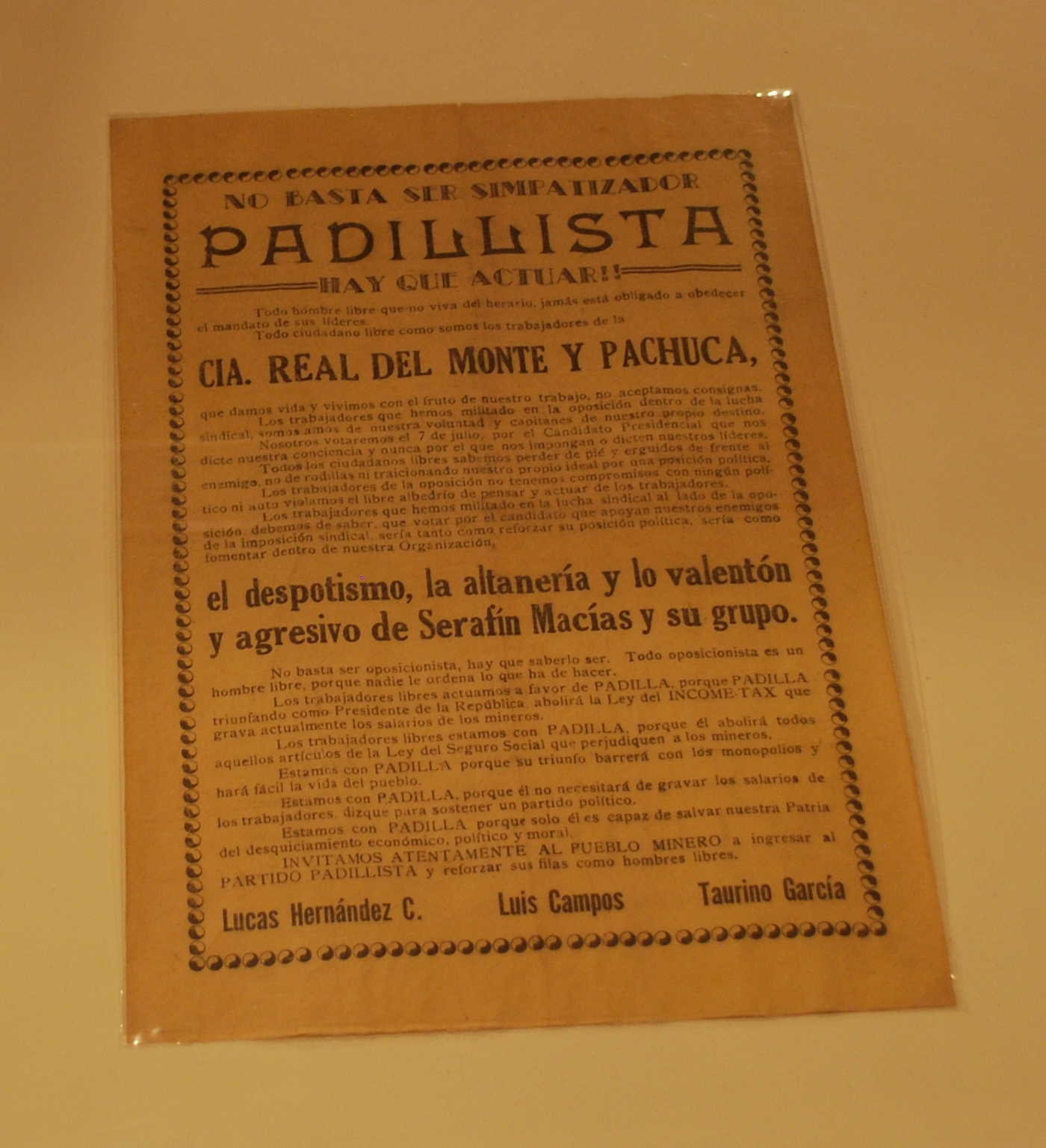
Manifesto from the Padilla campaign.

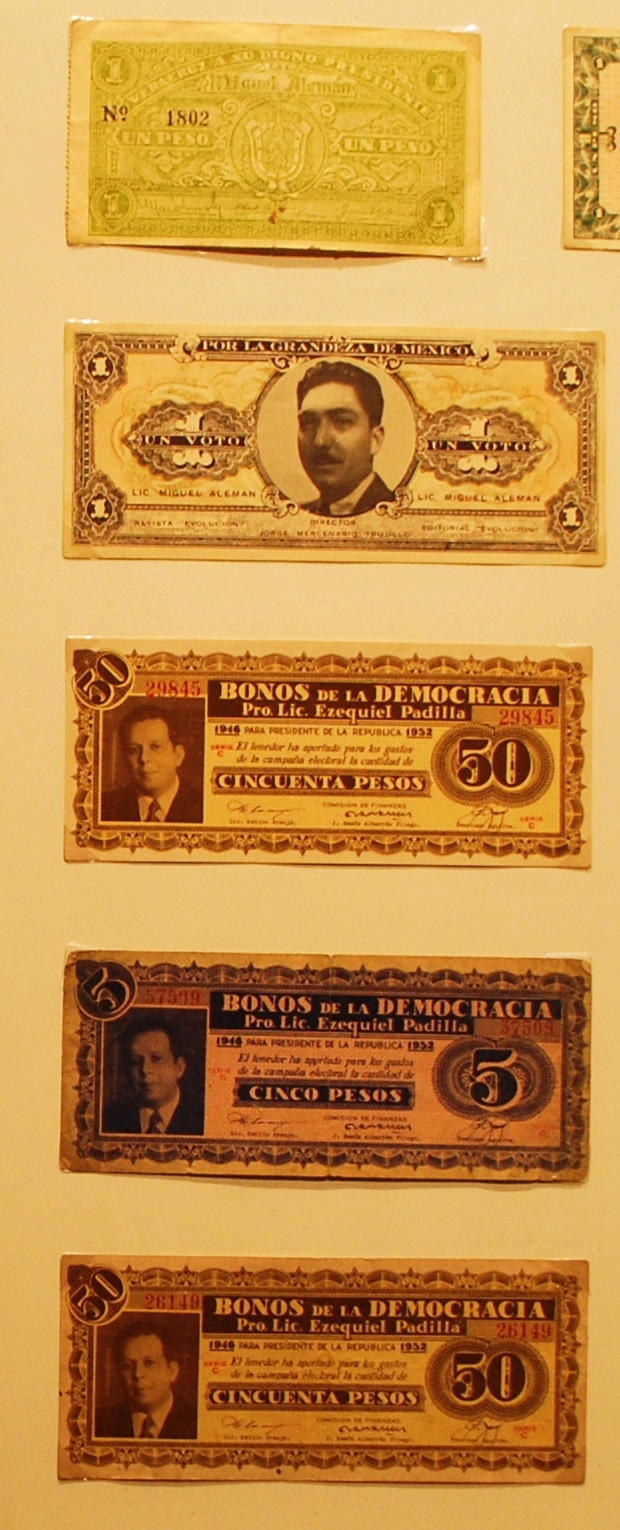
Contribution bonds for the Alemán and Padilla campaigns.

=== Chamber of Deputies ===
Party	Votes	%	Seats	+/–
Institutional Revolutionary Party	1,687,284	73.52	141	–6
National Action Party	51,312	2.24	4	+4
Mexican Communist Party	10,542	0.46	0	New
Other parties	545,790	23.78	2	–
Total	2,294,928	100.00	147	0
Registered voters/turnout	2,556,949	–		
Source: Nohlen
