= 6th federal electoral district of the State of Mexico =

Federal electoral district of Mexico

State of Mexico's 6th
- Electoral district of the Chamber of Deputies of Mexico

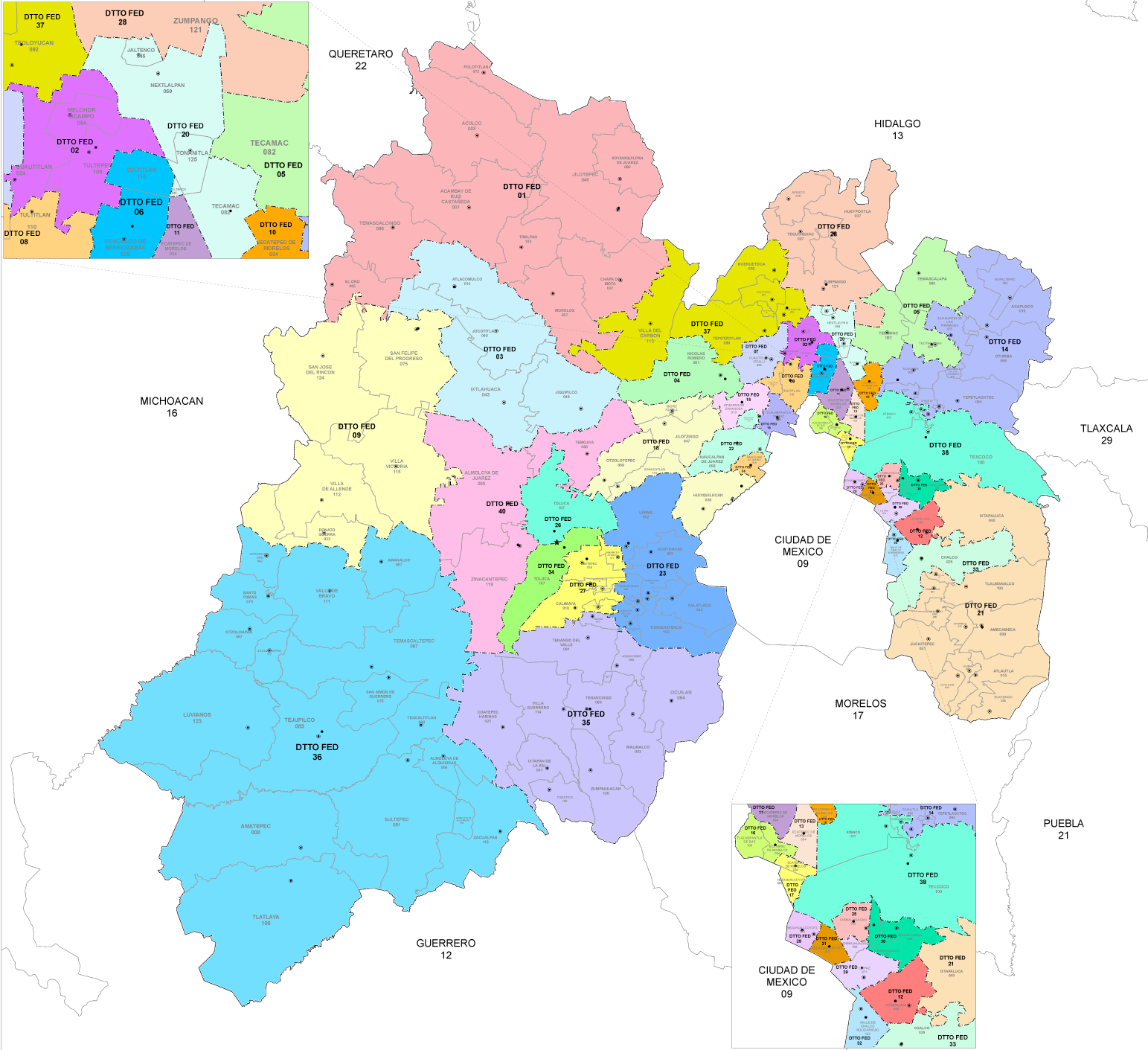
- State of Mexico's districts since 2023

Incumbent
- Member: Julieta Villalpando Riquelme
- Party: ▌Morena
- Congress: 66th (2024–2027)

District
- State: State of Mexico
- Head town: San Francisco Coacalco
- Coordinates: 19°38′N 99°05′W
- Covers: Coacalco de Berriozábal, Tultitlán (part)
- PR region: Fifth
- Precincts: 164
- Population: 452,400 (2020 census)

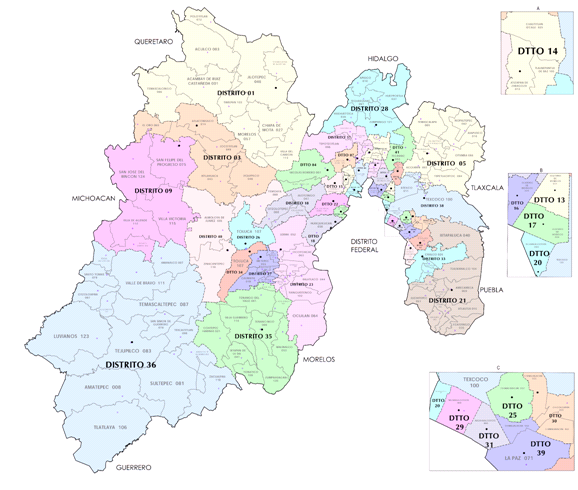
2017–2022 districting scheme

The 6th federal electoral district of the State of Mexico (Spanish: Distrito electoral federal 06 del Estado de México) is one of the 300 electoral districts into which Mexico is divided for elections to the federal Chamber of Deputies and one of 40 such districts in the State of Mexico.

It elects one deputy to the lower house of Congress for each three-year legislative session by means of the first-past-the-post system. Votes cast in the district also count towards the calculation of proportional representation ("plurinominal") deputies elected from the fifth region.

The current member for the district, elected in the 2024 general election, is Julieta Villalpando Riquelme of the National Regeneration Movement (Morena).

== District territory ==
Under the 2023 districting plan adopted by the National Electoral Institute (INE), which is to be used for the 2024, 2027 and 2030 federal elections, the 6th district covers 164 electoral precincts (secciones electorales) across two municipalities in the Greater Mexico City urban area:

- Coacalco de Berriozábal in its entirety, and Tultitlán's northern exclave. (Note: The bulk of Tultitlán is assigned to the 8th district.)

The head town (cabecera distrital), where results from individual polling stations are gathered together and tallied, is San Francisco Coacalco. In the 2020 census, the district reported a total population of 452,400.

== Previous districting schemes ==
Evolution of electoral district numbers
	1974	1978	1996	2005	2017	2023
State of Mexico	15	34	36	40	41	40
Chamber of Deputies	196	300				

Under the previous districting plans enacted by the INE and its predecessors, the 6th district was situated as follows:

2017–2022

The municipality of Coacalco de Berriozábal, the northern portion of Ecatepec, and Jaltenco's southern exclave. The head town was at Coacalco.

2005–2017

The municipalities of Coacalco de Berriozábal and Tultepec. The head town was at Coacalco.

1996–2005

The municipalities of Coacalco de Berriozábal, Tultepec and Melchor Ocampo. The head town was at Coacalco.

1978–1996

The municipalities of Coyotepec, Cuautitlán, Cuautitlán Izcalli, Huehuetoca and Tepotzotlán, with its head town at Cuautitlán.

== Deputies returned to Congress ==
(Mexico) National parties
- Current
- PAN
- PRI
- PT
- PVEM
- MC
- Morena
- PAZ
- Somos
- Defunct or local only
- PLM
- PNR
- PRM
- PNM
- PP
- PPS
- PARM
- PFCRN
- CON
- PANAL
- PSD
- PES
- PES
- PRD

State of Mexico's 6th district
Election	Deputy	Party	Term	Legislature
1916	None		1916–1917	Constituent Congress of Querétaro
...
1958	Carlos Hank González	Institutional Revolutionary Party	1958–1961	44th Congress
...
1979	Guillermo Olguín Ruiz	Institutional Revolutionary Party	1979–1982	51st Congress
1982	Guillermo Vargas Alarcón	Institutional Revolutionary Party	1982–1985	52nd Congress
1985	Juan Manuel Tovar Estrada	Institutional Revolutionary Party	1985–1988	53rd Congress
1988	Magdaleno Luis Miranda Reséndiz	Popular Socialist Party (Mexico)	1988–1991	54th Congress
1991	Luis Cuauhtémoc Riojas Guajardo	Institutional Revolutionary Party	1991–1994	55th Congress
1994	Juan Manuel Tovar Estrada	Institutional Revolutionary Party	1994–1997	56th Congress
1997	Héctor Guevara Ramírez	Institutional Revolutionary Party	1997–2000	57th Congress
2000	Francisco Guadarrama López	National Action Party (Mexico)	2000–2003	58th Congress
2003	María Eugenia Castillo Reyes	National Action Party (Mexico)	2003–2006	59th Congress
2006	Santiago López Becerra	Party of the Democratic Revolution	2006–2009	60th Congress
2009	Héctor Guevara Ramírez	Institutional Revolutionary Party	2009–2012	61st Congress
2012	Roberto Ruiz Moronatti	Institutional Revolutionary Party	2012–2015	62nd Congress
2015	David Sánchez Isidoro	Institutional Revolutionary Party	2015–2018	63rd Congress
2018	Carolina García Aguilar	Social Encounter Party	2018–2021	64th Congress
2021	Ali Sayuri Núñez Meneses (Note: Núñez Meneses switched allegiance from the PVEM to the PAN on 26 April 2022.)	Ecologist Green Party of Mexico National Action Party (Mexico)	2021–2024	65th Congress
2024	Julieta Villalpando Riquelme	National Regeneration Movement	2024–2027	66th Congress

== Presidential elections ==
State of Mexico's 6th district
Election	District won by	Party or coalition	%
2018	Andrés Manuel López Obrador	Juntos Haremos Historia	59.0694
2024	Claudia Sheinbaum Pardo	Sigamos Haciendo Historia	60.6688
