= Alejandro Glatt =

Mexican artist

- Born: c. 1995
- Known for: Papaya-themed art
- Notable work: Papayas to the Moon (2024); Papaya de Dr. Simi (2024)
- Movement: Pop art
- Website: alejandroglatt.com

Alejandro Glatt (born c. 1995) is a Mexican pop artist known for his papaya-themed artworks. In February 2024, he sent his artwork to the Moon as part of a project aboard the Intuitive Machines IM-1 mission. Glatt's works have been exhibited in Mexico and abroad.

== Early life ==
Alejandro Glatt was born 1994 or 1995 (age 31–32) into a Mexican-Jewish family.

== Career ==
Glatt uses the papaya as the central subject of his pop art work after attending an event in Turkey at which it was the only food remaining, having been struck by the fruit's varied colors and forms. Observing how other attendees interacted with the papayas, Glatt was inspired to incorporate the fruit further into his practice, leading him to create sculptures and additional works. According to Glatt, the papaya, native to Mexico, carries greater national symbolic significance than the chile pepper or avocado.

On 14 February 2024, Glatt's artwork, Papayas to the Moon, was sent to the Moon aboard the Intuitive Machines IM-1 (Nova-C) mission, launched from NASA's Kennedy Space Center. The work was included in the Lunaprise Museum, a nickel time capsule containing works by 222 worldwide artists, becoming the first Mexican to send a papaya to the moon. A replica was later exhibited at the Consulate General of Mexico in Miami. According to Glatt, Papayas to the Moon was intended to symbolize the four classical elements — earth, water, fire, and air – and to serve as a call for sustainability. He also described the work as part of a broader movement to connect humanity with the universe, with the papaya serving as a vehicle for reappropriating an everyday object and elevating it into a cultural icon.

In April 2024, Glatt exhibited at the Carrousel du Louvre, a shopping center adjacent the Louvre in Paris, an artwork titled Papayas to the Louvre. The exhibition included a piece titled Papaya de Dr. Simi, which incorporated 27 plush toys of Dr. Simi, the mascot of Farmacias Similares, attached to a papaya-shaped frame. Other works in the exhibition featured plush toys of the Mona Lisa, Frida Kahlo, SpongeBob, and the Teletubbies.

Glatt founded the "Feel the Fruit", an art project in which he sought to connect people through fruits. In 2022, Glatt participated in the MUFO (Museo del Futuro) pop-up exhibition in Mexico City, which included the Feel the Fruit project. He co-founded the Subreal Art Fair. The artworks of Glatt and Steph Ferrara were co-exhibited in the art exhibition Mexican on the Moon, at the Contemporary Art Museum of Quintana Roo in February 2025.
