= Héctor Guevara Ramírez =

Mexican politician (1956–2022)

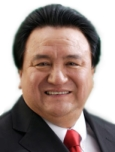

Municipal president of Coacalco de Berriozábal
- In office 1 January 1991 – 31 December 1993
- Preceded by: María Luis Marina
- Succeeded by: Felipe Ruíz Flores

Personal details
- Born: 29 September 1956 Huauchinango, Puebla, Mexico
- Died: 15 May 2022 (aged 65) Mexico City
- Party: Institutional Revolutionary Party
- Occupation: Politician

Héctor Guevara Ramírez (29 September 1956 – 15 May 2022) was a Mexican politician from the Institutional Revolutionary Party (PRI). In the 1997 legislative election he was elected to the Chamber of Deputies to represent the State of Mexico's 6th district, and in the 2009 mid-terms he was re-elected to the same seat. He was the municipal president of Coacalco de Berriozábal between 1991 and 1993.
