= Roberto Ruiz Moronatti =

Mexican politician

Municipal president of Coacalco de Berriozábal
- In office 1 January 2012 – 31 December 2015
- Preceded by: David Sánchez Isidoro
- Succeeded by: David Sánchez Isidoro

Personal details
- Born: 1 January 1982 (age 44) State of Mexico, Mexico
- Party: PRI
- Occupation: Politician
- Website: http://robertoruizmoronatti.com/mx/

Roberto Ruiz Moronatti (Note: In this Mexican name, the surname is Ruiz and the second or maternal family name is Moronatti.) (born 1 January 1982) is a Mexican politician affiliated with the Institutional Revolutionary Party (PRI).

Ruiz Moronatti served as the municipal president of Coacalco de Berriozábal, State of Mexico, from 2009 to 2012. In the 2012 general election he was elected to the Chamber of Deputies to represent the State of Mexico's 6th district during the 62nd session of Congress.
