= Jorge Emilio González Martínez =

Mexican politician (born 1972)

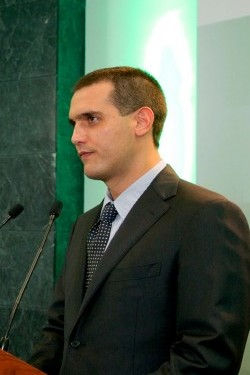

Member of the Chamber of Deputies from Quintana Roo
- In office 1 September 2018 – 9 April 2019
- Succeeded by: Jorge Corona Méndez
- Constituency: 3rd electoral region

Member of the Chamber of Deputies from the Federal District
- In office 1 September 1997 – 31 August 2000
- Constituency: 4th electoral region

Personal details
- Born: 16 April 1972 (age 54) Federal District, Mexico
- Party: PVEM
- Parent: Jorge González Torres (father)
- Education: UVM
- Occupation: Politician
- Website: web.archive.org/web/20140224205916/http://www.jorgeemiliogonzalez.com/web

Jorge Emilio González Martínez (born 16 April 1972 in Mexico City), popularly known as El Niño Verde (the Green Boy), is a Mexican politician affiliated with the Ecologist Green Party of Mexico (PVEM). He serves as a senator in the LXII Legislature of the Mexican Congress representing Quintana Roo. He also served as a senator from 2000 to 2006 and as a federal deputy from 1997 to 2000.

González Martínez took over leadership of the PVEM in 2001 from his father, Jorge González Torres, who founded the party in 1986. His uncle Víctor González Torres is the owner of the Farmacias Similares drugstore franchise and was a write-in candidate for president in 2006. His maternal grandfather, Emilio Martínez Manatou, was an Institutional Revolutionary Party congressman, presidential hopeful in 1970 and the governor of Tamaulipas from 1981 to 1987.

== Controversies ==
In February 2004 as part of the Mexican Videoscandals, a grainy hidden-camera video aired on Mexican television, showing González Martínez allegedly negotiating a $2 million bribe to assist in the development of a hotel in an ecologically protected area near Cancún. González Martínez at first claimed that the video was fake, then claimed he was part of a sting to expose crooked developers, before finally claiming that the video was part of a smear campaign set up by the Vicente Fox administration.

In February 2013, González Martínez was arrested for driving while intoxicated in Mexico City. He reportedly gave police officers a fake name and refused to take a breathalyzer test. González Martínez's bodyguards also reportedly attempted to bribe the police, and then tried to forcibly free him from police custody. A video game parodying the incident was made available for download.
