= San Francisco de Asís Parish (Coacalco de Berriozábal) =

- Parroquia de San Francisco de Asís
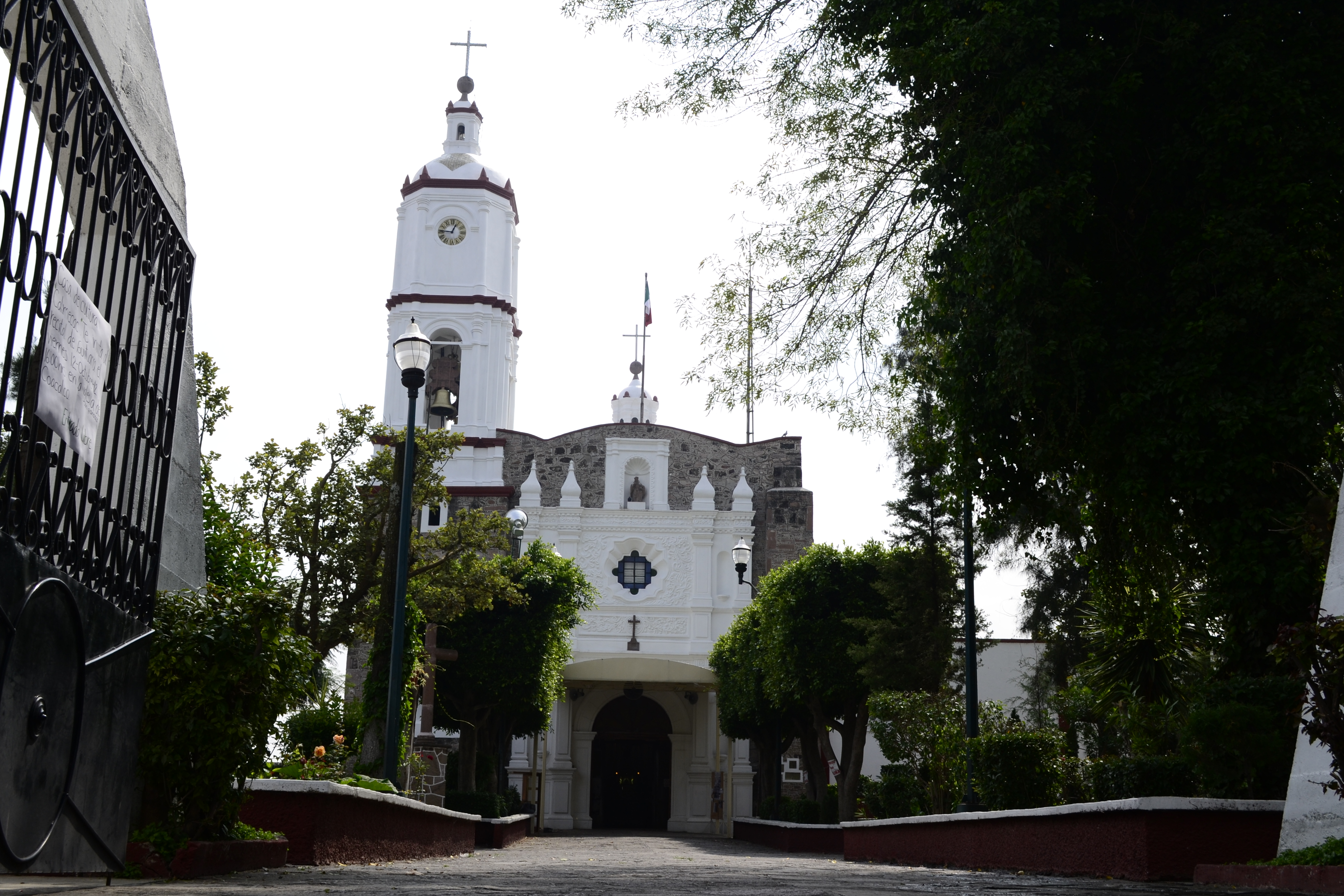
- Main façade
- San Francisco de Asís Parish
- 19.63025°N 99.10398°W
- Location: Coacalco de Berriozábal, State of Mexico
- Country: Mexico
- Denomination: Catholic

History
- Status: Parish church
- Dedication: Francis of Assisi
- Dedicated: 4 October
- Consecrated: c. 1580

Architecture
- Completed: c. 1770

Administration
- Diocese: Cuautitlán

San Francisco de Asís Parish (Spanish: Parroquia de San Francisco de Asís) is a Catholic parish church in San Francisco Coacalco, in the municipality of Coacalco de Berriozábal, State of Mexico. It is dedicated to Francis of Assisi, whose feast is on 4 October. The church was opened c. 1580 and the parish was completed c. 1770. It is part of the Diocese of Cuautitlán. The facade is a mixture of late baroque and early neoclassical styles.

== History and architecture ==
The first parish was built as a lodging house for Franciscan friars traveling to the old sanctuary at Tepeyac (later the Basilica of Our Lady of Guadalupe), serving as a midway point between the sanctuary and the Cuautitlán Cathedral in Cuautitlán.

The original building features Tequitqui art, a style in which Indigenous builders worked from foreign images provided by friars and substituted certain elements with motifs familiar to Indigenous communities to make them more recognizable. Due to the area's sparse population, a temple was not built until about 200 years later, after the population had grown.

The former church was later used as the town's school, admitting only boys, while girls were educated in a separate building. The original parish halls were demolished to create an open courtyard.

The atrium contains four processional chapels, one at each corner, designed for Stations of the Cross processions and for displaying patron saints during major religious festivals. The walls also feature several Stations of the Cross mosaics. There are also some sundials.

The façade architecture of the San Francisco de Asís Parish is similar to that of the Parish of Saint Bartholomew the Apostle and the Parish of Saint Mary, in Santa María Ajoloapan, both of which were built by Franciscans and are located in Hueypoxtla Municipality. One of the parish towers was constructed using materials salvaged from a demolished section of the original building.

Beginning in the 19th century, neoclassical architecture became favored over the baroque style. A cypress (an ornamental canopy over the main altar) was installed inside the parish church, although it was later removed.
