= Víctor González Torres =

Mexican businessman and politician

Víctor Manuel González Torres
- Born: June 1, 1947 (age 79); Mexico City, Mexico
- Education: Universidad Iberoamericana
- Occupations: Businessman, politician
- Relatives: Jorge González Torres (brother); Jorge Emilio González Martínez (nephew)

Víctor González Torres (Note: In this Mexican name, the surname is González and the second or maternal family name is Torres.) (born July 1, 1947) is a Mexican pharmaceutical businessman and politician, popularly known as Doctor Simi, the name of the character that represents his chain of companies, collectively called Farmacias Similares.

== Personal life and family ==
Born in Mexico City, Victor González Torres comes from a family with a history in politics and business: one of his brothers, Javier González Torres, is the owner of Farmacias Fénix, Farmacias de Genéricos, and the IGFA Laboratories. His other brother, Jorge González Torres, was the founder and first president of the Ecologist Green Party of Mexico (Partido Verde Ecologista de México, PVEM) and was their presidential candidate in the general elections of 1994. His other brother, Enrique González Torres, is a Jesuit priest and rector at the Universidad Iberoamericana.

== Pharmaceutical business ==
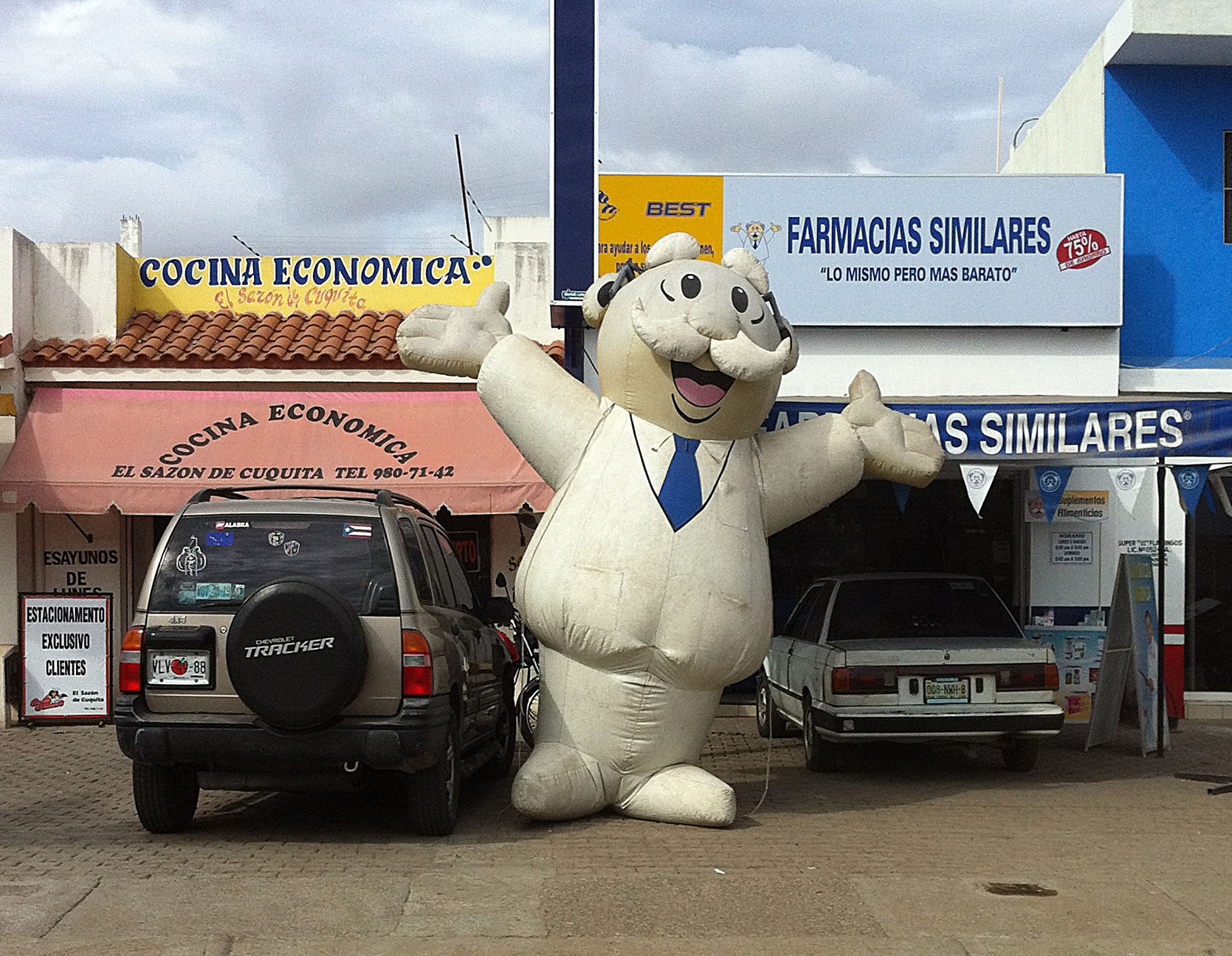
A branch of Farmacias Similares in Mazatlán, Sinaloa

Víctor González Torres first gained notoriety as the owner of the Farmacias Similares chain. Farmacias Similares sells generic medications (called medicamentos genéricos in Spanish), which can be sold at a lower price than name-brand drugs. In order to sell a generic drug to the public, Farmacias Similares has to cite a bioavailability study that accredits the generic drug as interchangeable for its name-brand counterpart. Notably, these bioavailability studies are only done at the first shipment of the generic, so critics note that the ongoing quality of such generics cannot be guaranteed.

Critics generally claim that generic medicines sold by Farmacias Similares cannot be considered as equivalents to those with recognized brand names, despite the Mexican law that requires bioavailability studies. Similarly, Farmacias Similares' slogan Lo Mismo, Pero Más Barato ("The Same, but Cheaper") has faced criticism and even lawsuits from pharmaceutical companies, but to date none of these lawsuits have come to trial.

González Torres has responded that, if generic drugs did not work, people would not use them. He generally claims to defend the rights of the less-fortunate with his cheaper products. He has publicized his goals by assuming the personality that represents his pharmacies, Dr. Simi.

Farmacias Similares has more than 6,000 branches in Mexico and Central and South America. The chain is estimated to control a quarter of the Mexican pharmaceutical industry.

González Torres is also the founder and director of an associated charitable body, The Group for a Better Country (Grupo Por Un País Mejor), which seeks to provide low-cost medical services and provide a platform against official corruption.

== Candidate for President of Mexico ==
In 2005, González Torres publicly expressed his interest in being a presidential candidate. He stated that all of the traditional political parties were corrupt and that only he, as an independent citizen committed to the less-fortunate, could fight it. To justify his claims, he referenced surveys in which he had support of nearly 80% of the voting populations, although none of those surveys were conducted by a polling station registered with the Instituto Federal Electoral (IFE).

He initially intended to be registered as an independent candidate. Mexican electoral law at the time did not recognize independent candidature until González, together with the former secretary of foreign affairs during the government of Vicente Fox, Jorge Castañeda Gutman, who also intended to register as independent candidates, appealed to the Supreme Court, which ultimately approved of independent candidacies.

So, González Torres sought to be the candidate for the Partido Alternativa Socialdemócrata y Campesina, supported by the working-class sector of that party; however, that party had already chosen Patricia Mercado as their candidate. He then presented his registration with the Federal Electoral Institute while instituting a media attack against Mercado, Alberto Begné Guerra, and journalists such as Joaquín López-Dóriga. The IFE ultimately rejected his candidacy, only recognizing Mercado, a decision which was upheld by the Federal Electoral Tribunal.

Despite the Federal Electoral Tribunal's rejection of his candidacy, González Torres continued his campaign, declaring himself an Unregistered Independent Peoples Candidate, calling for his supporters to vote for him in the blank space on ballots and pushed the IFE to count such votes. During his campaigns, he met with Roberto Madrazo and Felipe Calderón Hinojosa, candidates from the Partido Revolucionario Institucional and Partido Acción Nacional, respectively. In television and written propaganda, he was compared with Andrés Manuel López Obrador, candidate from the political coalition called the Coalición Por el Bien de Todos. Since he considered López Obrador a radical and populist, he also financed, in violation of electoral law, television spots and paid notes in magazines and newspapers that slandered López Obrador.

González Torres also demanded to be included in a televised debate with the five major presidential candidates. On the day of the debate, he went to the Polyforum Cultural Siqueiros, a building adjacent to the debate's venue, where he set up screens with political ideas from the other candidates, and debated those ideas when Patricia Mercado spoke.

The IFE ultimately did not recognize votes for González Torres, considering that he did not meet the eligibility requirements established by the constitution.

Many media outlets covered his campaign and his struggle with the Federal Electoral Institute (IFE) for legitimacy, while others considered him a sort of "comic relief".

== In popular culture ==
In 2022 it became a trend to throw Doctor Simi plushies to singers in Mexico, and this was widely covered in social media.
