= Gabriela Aguilar García =

Mexican politician

Senator of the Senate of the Republic
- In office 28 August 2006 – 1 September 2009
- Constituency: Federal District

Personal details
- Born: 15 September 1973 (age 52) Mexico City, Mexico
- Party: Ecologist Green Party of Mexico
- Occupation: Politician

Gabriela Aguilar García (born 15 September 1973) is a Mexican politician affiliated with the Ecologist Green Party of Mexico.

From 2006 to 2009, she served as a member of the Senate of the Republic in the LXI Legislature of the Mexican Congress, representing the Federal District.

== See also ==
- List of Mexicans
