= Francisco Guadarrama López =

Mexican politician

- Born: 10 October 1947 (age 78); Jocotitlán, State of Mexico, Mexico
- Occupation: Politician
- Political party: PAN

Francisco Guadarrama López (born 10 October 1947) is a Mexican politician from the National Action Party (PAN). In the 2000 general election he was elected to the Chamber of Deputies to represent the State of Mexico's sixth district during the 58th session of Congress (2000–2003).
