= Farmacias Similares =

Mexican pharmacy chain

- A store in Mexico City
- Industry: Retail
- Founded: 1997; 29 years ago in Mexico City, Mexico
- Founder: Víctor González Torres
- Area served: Mexico, Latin America, United States, Japan
- Products: Pharmacy

Farmacias Similares is a Mexican pharmacy chain. It was founded by the businessman Víctor González Torres in 1997 to sell generic drugs at prices lower than those of brand-name medications. The chain operates under the slogan "Lo mismo pero más barato" ('The same, but cheaper'), and its mascot is Dr. Simi, a physician. The chain has franchises in Mexico, multiple Latin American countries, the United States, and Japan.

== History ==
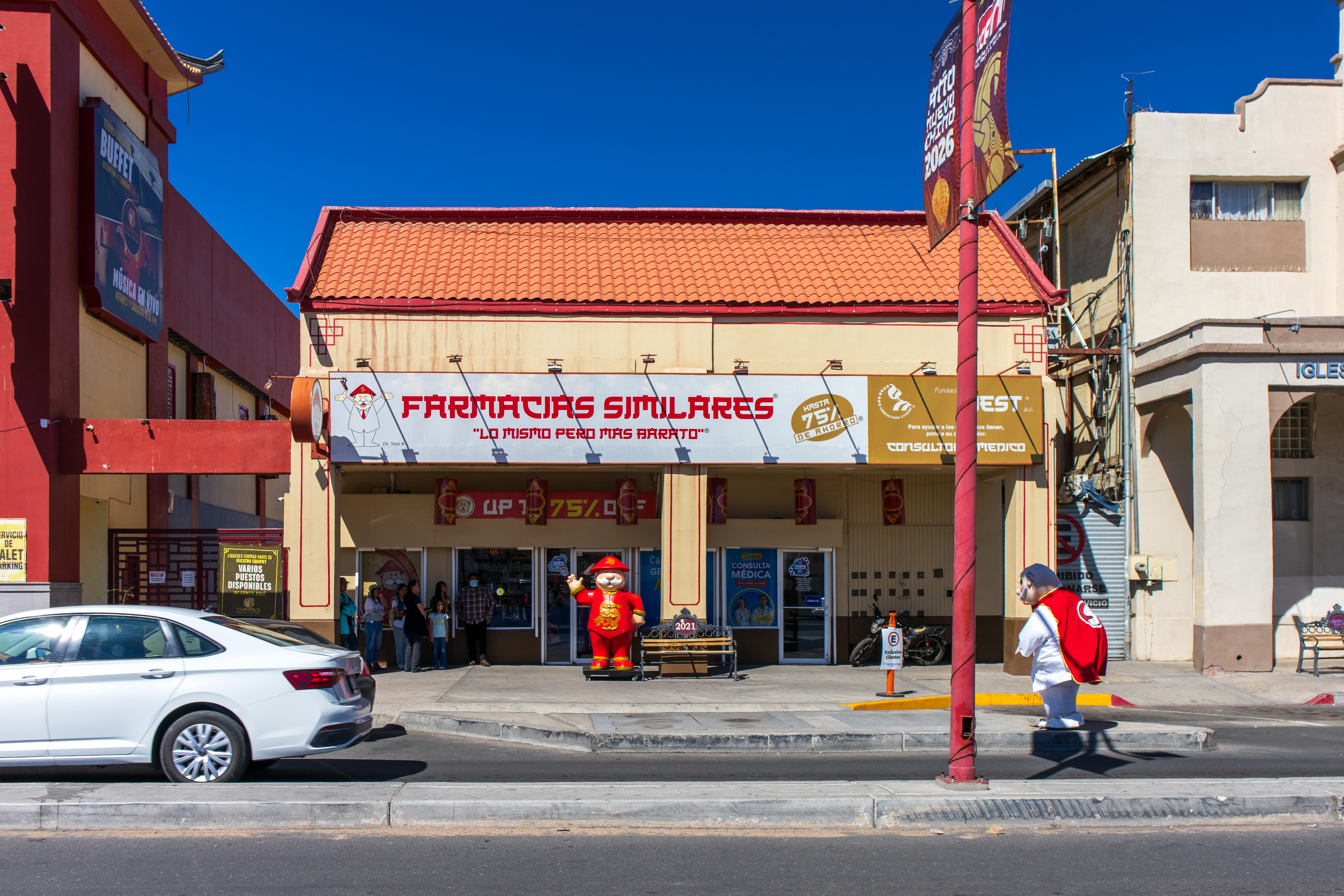
A Farmacias Similares store in La Chinesca, Mexicali. Both the store and Dr. Simi are decorated with Chinese-inspired design elements.

Businessman Víctor González Torres is the son of Roberto González Terán, founder of Laboratorios Best, a laboratory company that supplies generic drugs to the federal government of Mexico. Following the 1994 North American Free Trade Agreement, the healthcare sector was subject to new regulations that allowed for these sale of generic drugs.

González Torres founded in 1997 Farmacias Similares, a pharmacy chain, with the intention to sell generic drugs at prices lower than those of brand-name medications—up to 75 percent cheaper and comparable to those offered by the Mexican Social Security Institute (IMSS).

Some stores also include physician clinics, a model also shared by other private pharmacy chains, such as Farmacias del Ahorro and Farmacias San Pablo. This model contributed to the growth of these chains by making healthcare services more accessible, particularly in underserved areas. In 1998, Farmacias Similares operated two clinics. By 2022, that number had grown to 7,597 across Mexico.

In 1999, the company was reorganized into its main corporate entity and several philanthropic foundations. By 2002, the company had expanded to over 1,000 stores in Mexico. In 2002, Farmacias Similares opened its first international stores, in Argentina. Then expanding to Guatemala in 2003, Chile in 2005, Colombia in 2024, United States in 2025, and Japan in 2026.

In December 2022, González Torres was replaced by his son Víctor González Herrera as CEO of Farmacias Similares.

== Other ventures ==
Similandia at the Cosmopol shopping center

In 2023, Farmacias Similares launched Similandia, a thematic store offering entertainment areas, selling official merchandise, as well as pharmacy and medical clinic services. In 2025, the company opened SimiPet Care, a chain of veterinary clinics whose mascot is Dr. Lares, the wife of Dr. Simi.
