= Santiago López Becerra =

Mexican politician

- Born: 21 October 1949 (age 76); State of Mexico, Mexico
- Occupation: Politician
- Political party: PRD

Santiago López Becerra (born 21 October 1949) is a Mexican politician affiliated with the Party of the Democratic Revolution (PRD). In the 2006 general election he was elected to the Chamber of Deputies to represent the State of Mexico's sixth district during the 60th session of Congress.
