= Felipe Berriozábal =

Mexican politician

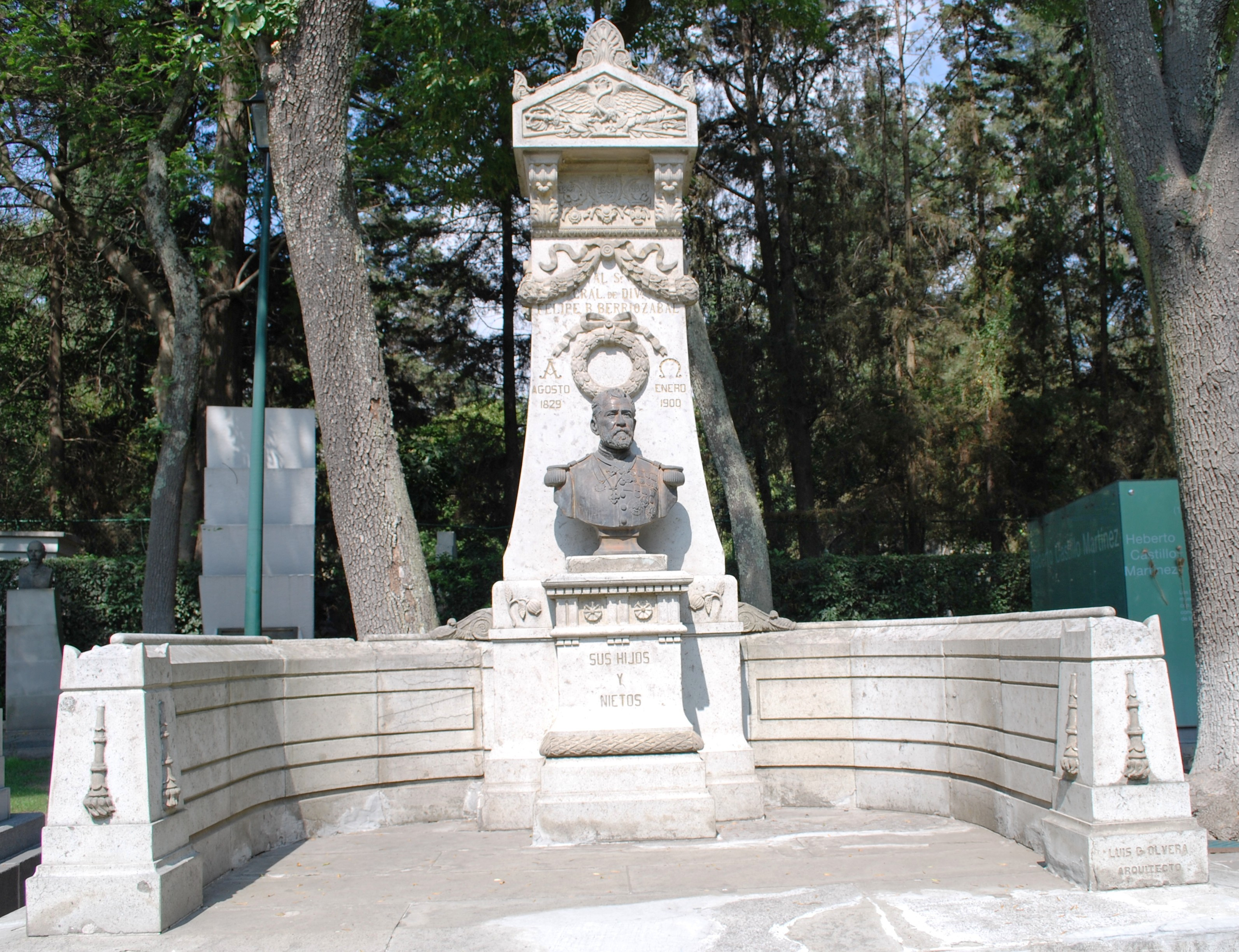
- Tomb of Berriozábal located in Mexico City

Secretary of War and Navy
- In office 20 March 1896 – 9 January 1900
- President: Porfirio Díaz
- Preceded by: Pedro Hinojosa
- Succeeded by: Bernardo Reyes
- In office 26 May 1863 – 18 August 1863
- President: Benito Juárez
- Preceded by: Miguel Blanco Múzquiz
- Succeeded by: Ignacio Comonfort

Personal details
- Born: 23 August 1829 Zacatecas, Mexico
- Died: 9 January 1900 (aged 70) Mexico City, Mexico
- Party: Liberal

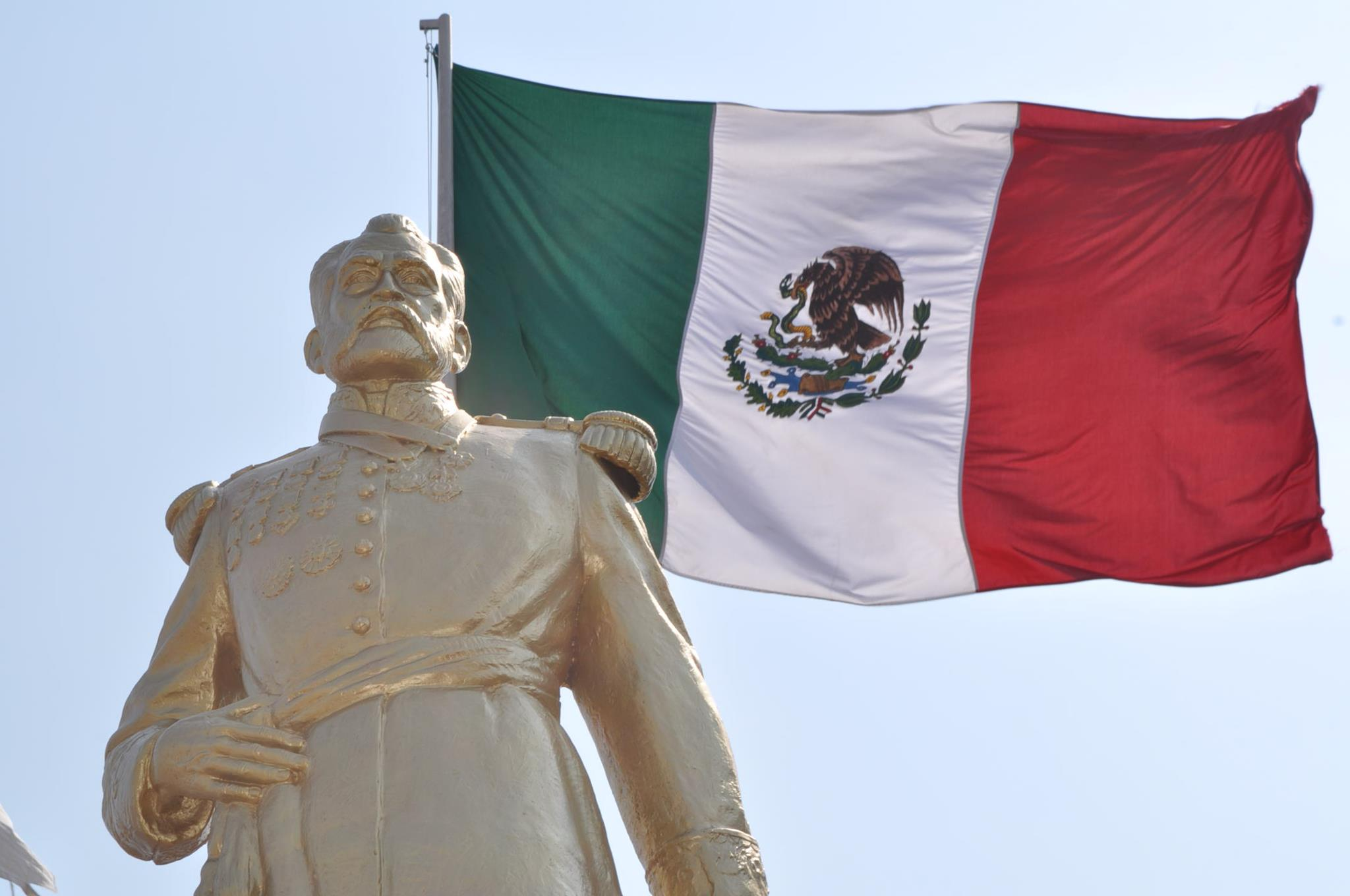
Statue of Berriozábal located in Coacalco de Berriozábal, State of Mexico

Felipe Berriozábal (born August 23, 1829, in Zacatecas, Zacatecas – died January 9, 1900, in Mexico City) was a Mexican politician, engineer and military leader. He participated in the Reform War (Spanish: Guerra de Reforma) and in the fight against French Intervention in Mexico. He was a member of president Benito Juárez's cabinet, serving as Secretary of War and Secretary of Marine. Berriozábal also served during Porfirio Díaz's government. He was a commander of the Mexican Army and member of the Chamber of Deputies.

== Biography ==
Born in Zacatecas, Zacatecas, he was the son of Juan José Berriozábal Urrutia, a Basque native of Elorrio who had settled in the city of Zacatecas in 1810, and María de la Soledad Basabe Márquez, a criolla born in Jerez.

Berriozábal was named Secretary of War in 1865 under Benito Juárez's term. He was also elected governor of the State of Mexico and Michoacán. By the end of the 19th century he was appointed Ministry of Government by Porfirio Díaz. He finally was chosen to be Ministry of War. He died on January 9, 1900. His remains were interred on January 12, 1900 at the Rotunda of Illustrious Persons. A municipality was named after him, Coacalco de Berriozábal, in State of Mexico.
