= Cosmopol =

Shopping mall in the State of Mexico, Mexico

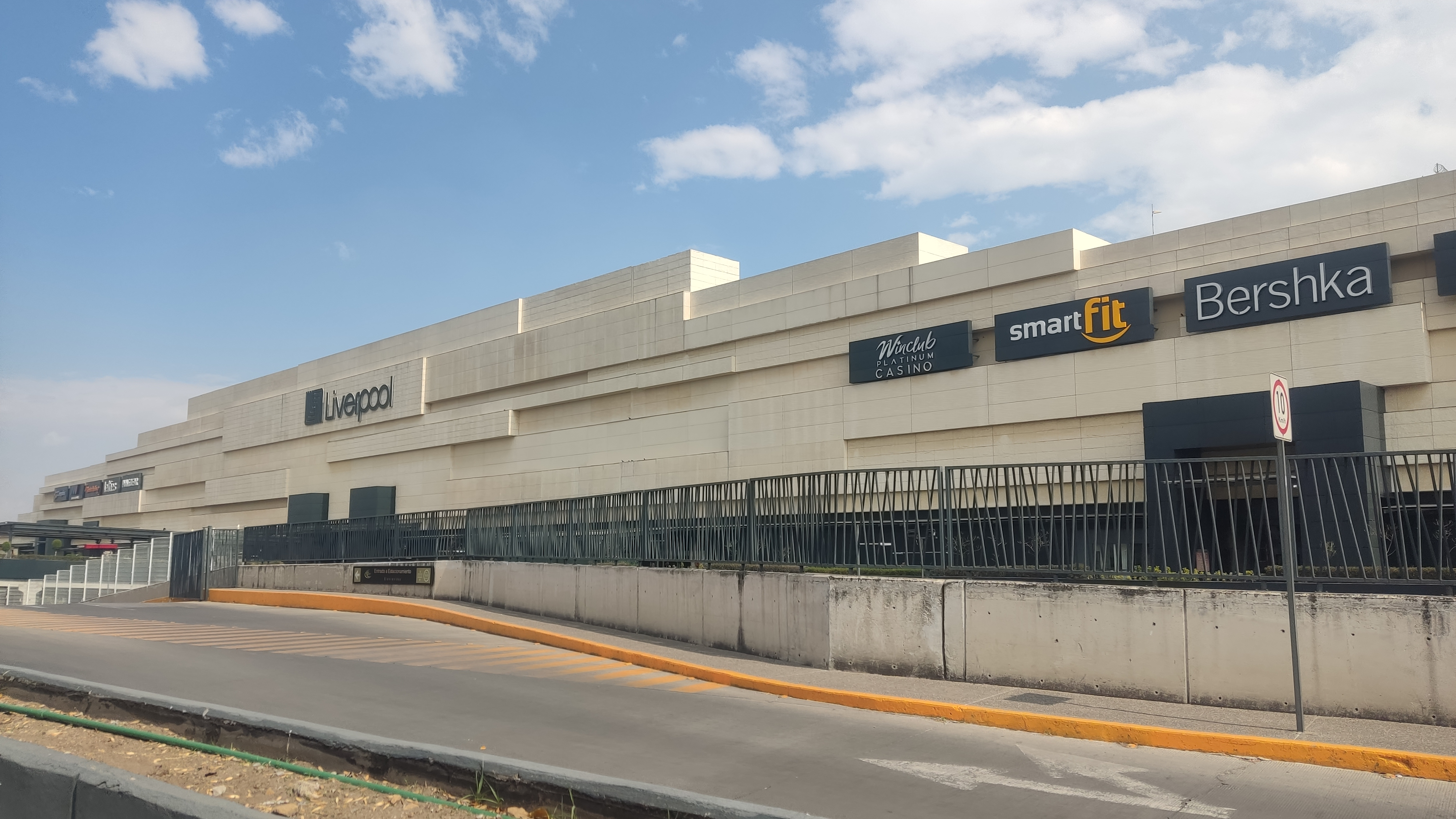
- The shopping mall in 2023

- Location within Mexico City urban area
- area map

General information
- Location: Av. José López Portillo #1, Coacalco de Berriozábal, State of Mexico, Mexico
- Coordinates: 19.6319°N 99.1244°W
- Inaugurated: 10 September 2015

Dimensions
- Diameter: 400 m (1,300 ft)
- Other dimensions: 65,000 m^{2} (700,000 sq ft) (site area)

Technical details
- Size: 210,000 m^{2} (2,300,000 sq ft) (total area)
- Floor count: 3

Design and construction
- Architecture firm: Migdal Arquitectos

Other information
- Number of stores: >200
- Number of anchors: 2
- Public transit: Coacalco Berriozábal bus station

Website
- cosmopol.com.mx/

Cosmopol is a shopping mall in Coacalco de Berriozábal, State of Mexico, in the metropolitan area of Mexico City, located along José López Portillo Avenue. The mall was opened in September 2015. It is anchored by Liverpool and Sears, and it has over 210 stores and services and 2,900 parking lots.

== History and construction ==
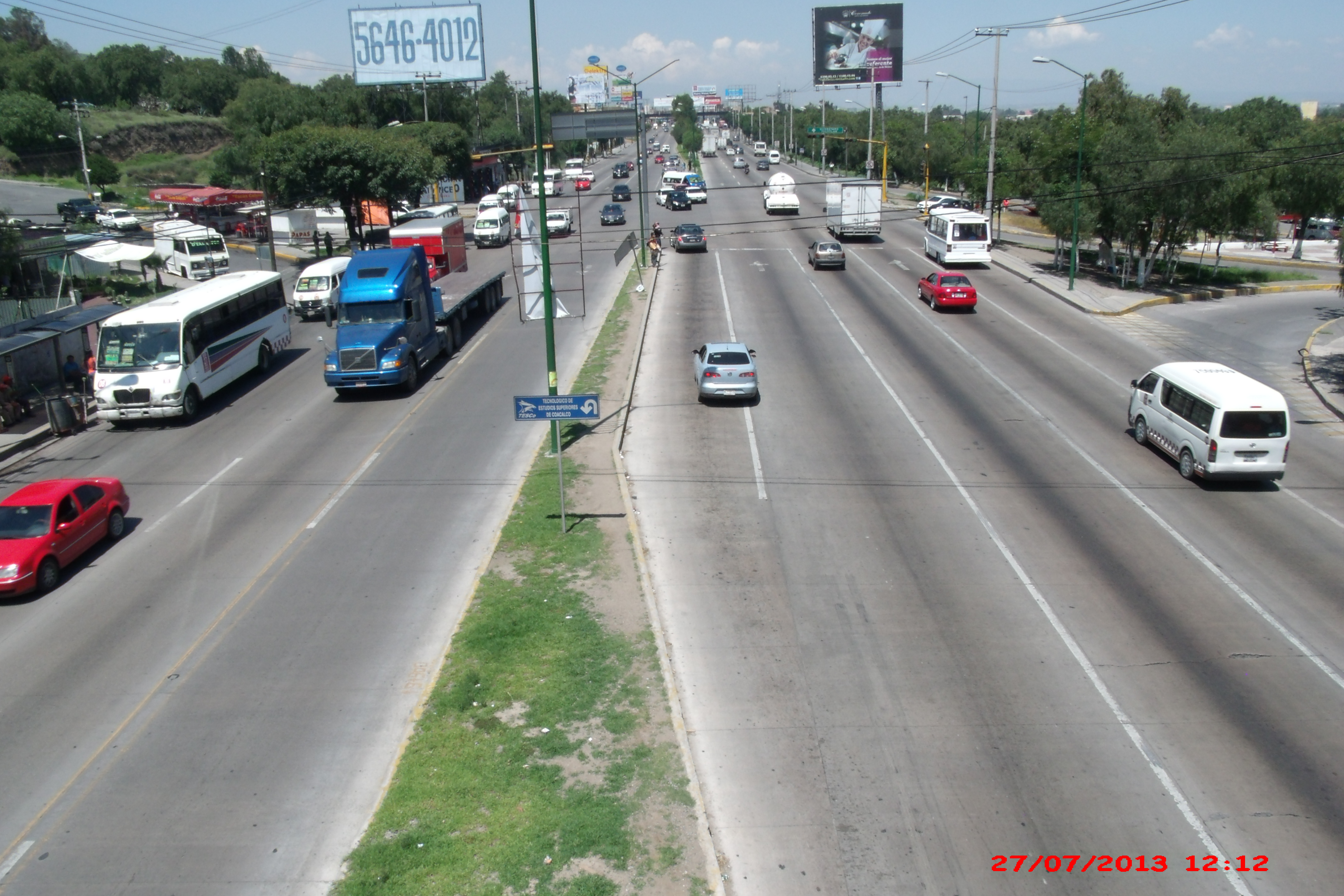
Vía López Portillo in 2013. The mall would be built to the right of the pedestrian bridge visible in the background.

For the construction of the shopping center, a 65,000 square meters (700,000 sq ft) site was used. The space is located at José López Portillo Avenue #1, in the municipality of Coacalco de Berriozábal, in the State of Mexico, north of Mexico City. The main facade measures 400 m (1,300 ft) and the mall has a depth of 10 m (33 ft) below street level. It has three levels and two basement levels for parking, plus an external parking lot behind the center. Its total area is 210,000 square meters (2,300,000 sq ft). Inside the shopping center, there are two sculptures, one by Sebastián and the other by Tere Metta.

The area is serviced by the State of Mexico's Mexibús, a bus rapid transit system, at Coacalco Berriozábal station. There is a residential center named Cosmopol Lifestyle behind the shopping center.

=== Incidents ===
During the afternoon of 20 July 2017, a group of people went on a shooting spree at an iShopMixup store and stole multiple electronic devices. On the night of 11 September 2017, a group of people robbed the jewelry store Bizarro. On 2 February 2022, two people robbed the Sanborns store and stole cell phones.

== Gallery ==
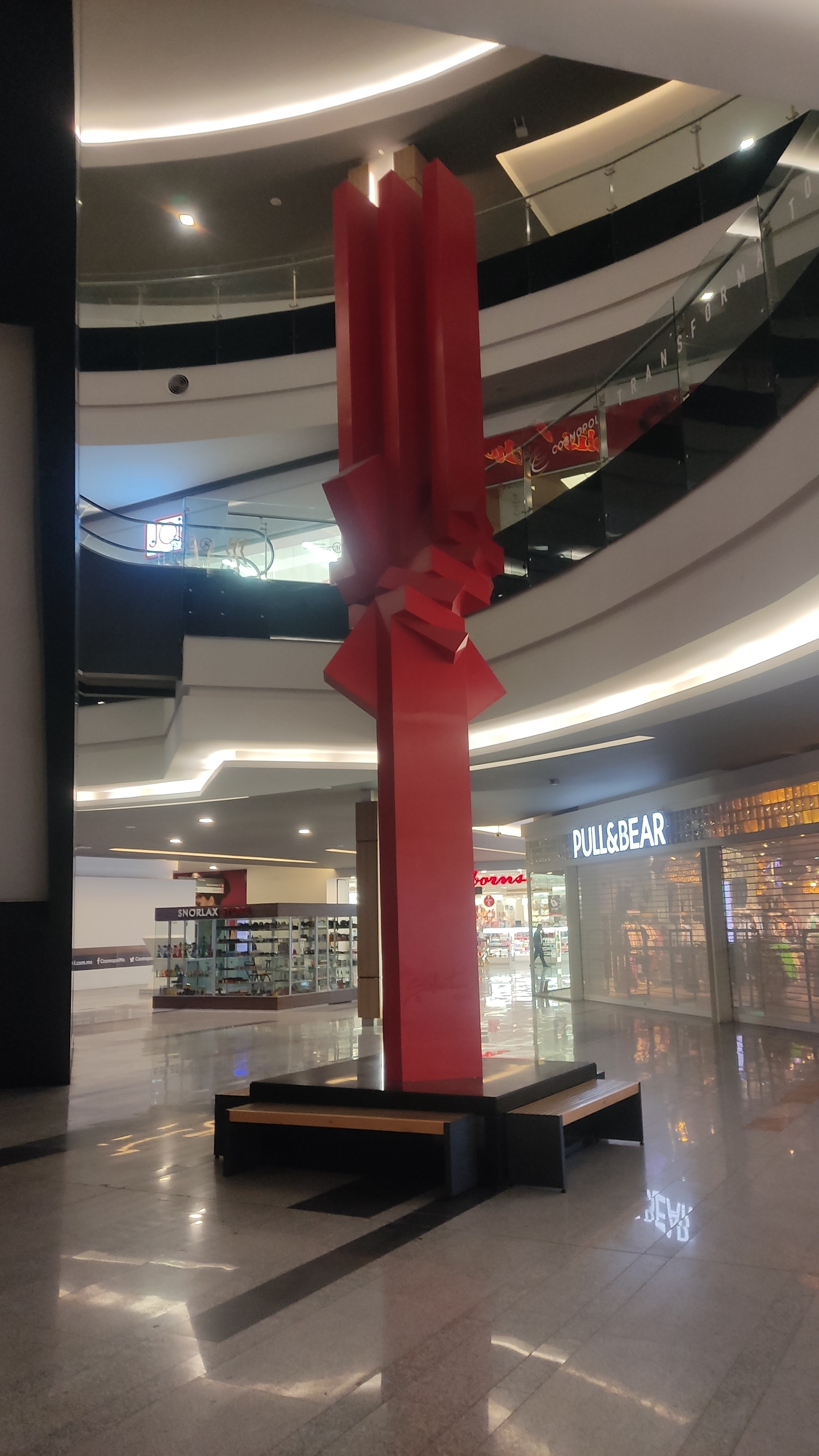
Columna Lugo by Sebastián

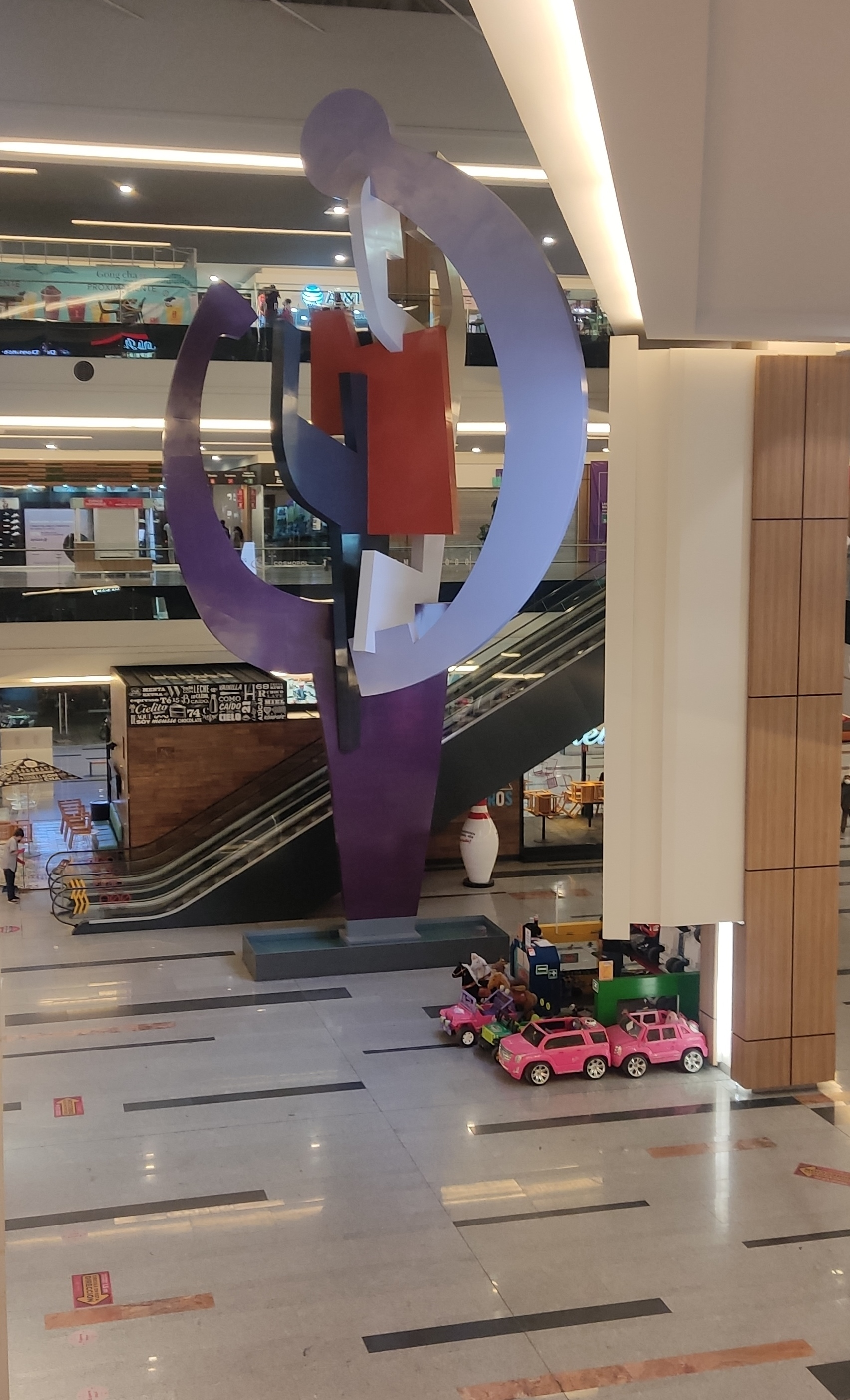
Familia by Tere Metta
