= San Bartolomé Parish (Hueypoxtla) =

- San Bartolomé Parish
- 20°16′06″N 98°56′35″W
- Location: Hueypoxtla
- Country: Mexico
- Denomination: Roman Catholic

History
- Status: Parish
- Consecrated: 1593

San Bartolomé Parish is the Catholic church and parish house of the people of Hueypoxtla. Has always belonged to the Diocese of Cuautitlán in Mexico. This colonial building is a monument of great architectural importance dedicated to Saint Bartholomew.

== History ==
In 1934, a gate catacomb with 72 crypts under the floor inside the temple was discovered. The tombs belong to mostly moneyed Spaniards who lived around the village of Hueypoxtla during the 16th to 19th centuries. There are also bones of indigenous people as a child, according to the book of deaths.
