= Dr. Simi =

Mexican mascot

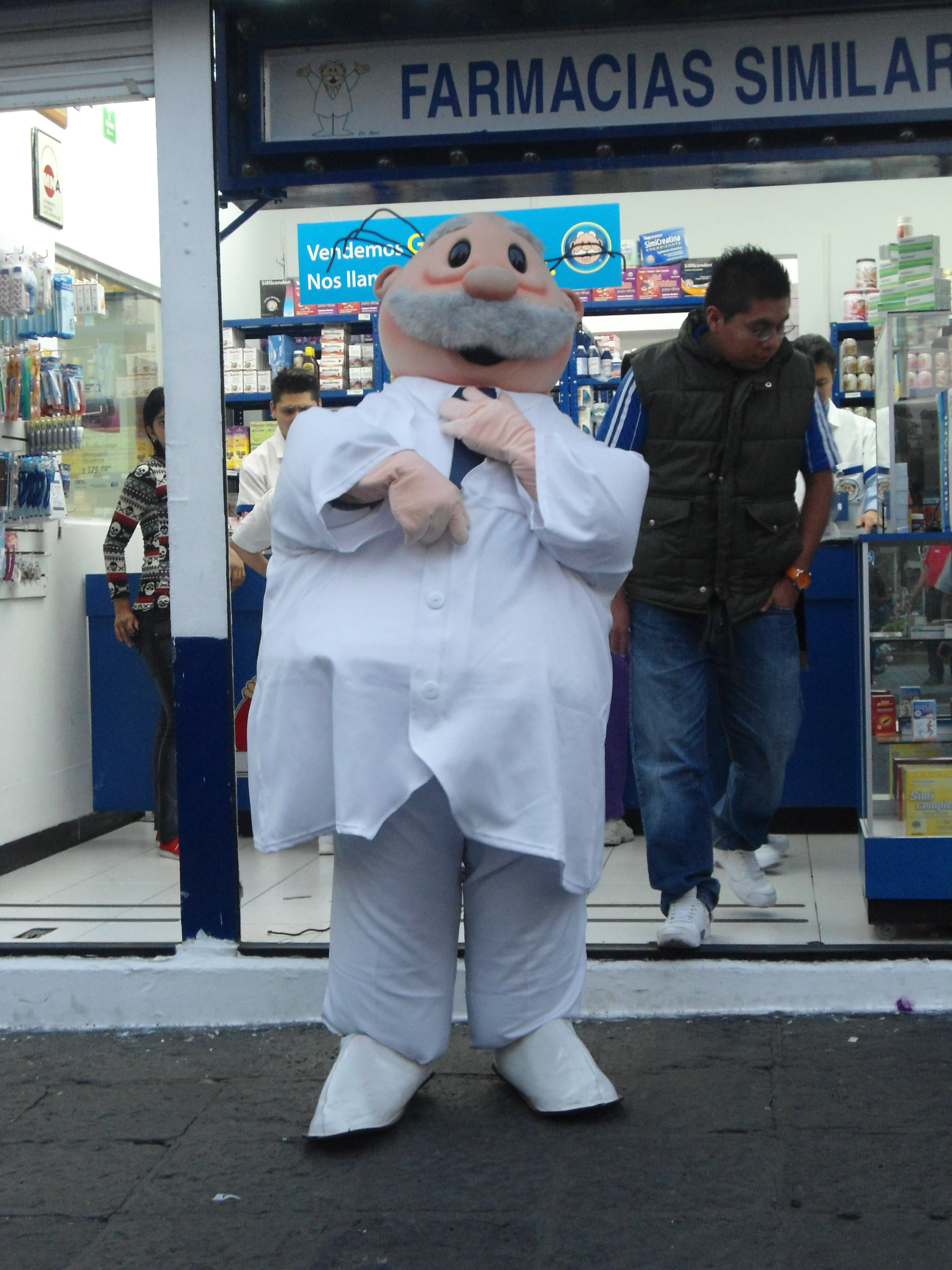
- A Dr. Simi standard costume
- First appearance: 1997
- Created by: Farmacias Similares
- Based on: Joaquín Pardavé
- Designed by: Daniel Burgos
- Voiced by: Arturo Martínez Aviña

In-universe information
- Occupation: Physician
- Significant other: Dr. Lares
- Nationality: Mexican

Dr. Simi is the mascot of Farmacias Similares, a Mexican pharmacy chain. Dr. Simi is depicted as an elderly, smiling physician with a large moustache and eyebrows, wearing a white doctor's coat. Outside many stores, people dressed as Dr. Simi in mascot costumes can often be seen dancing.

Dr. Simi was created alongside Farmacias Similares in 1997. His character design was inspired by Joaquín Pardavé's character in the film My Memories of Mexico (1944), with the intention of portraying him as a trustworthy, calm, and wise figure.

The character's reception has changed over time. During the 2000s, costumed Dr. Simi mascots were often tackled in the streets. Since then, however, Dr. Simi plush toys have become popular gifts from fans to musicians during concerts. The plush toys are typically customized with outfits resembling those worn by the artist receiving them.

== Design ==
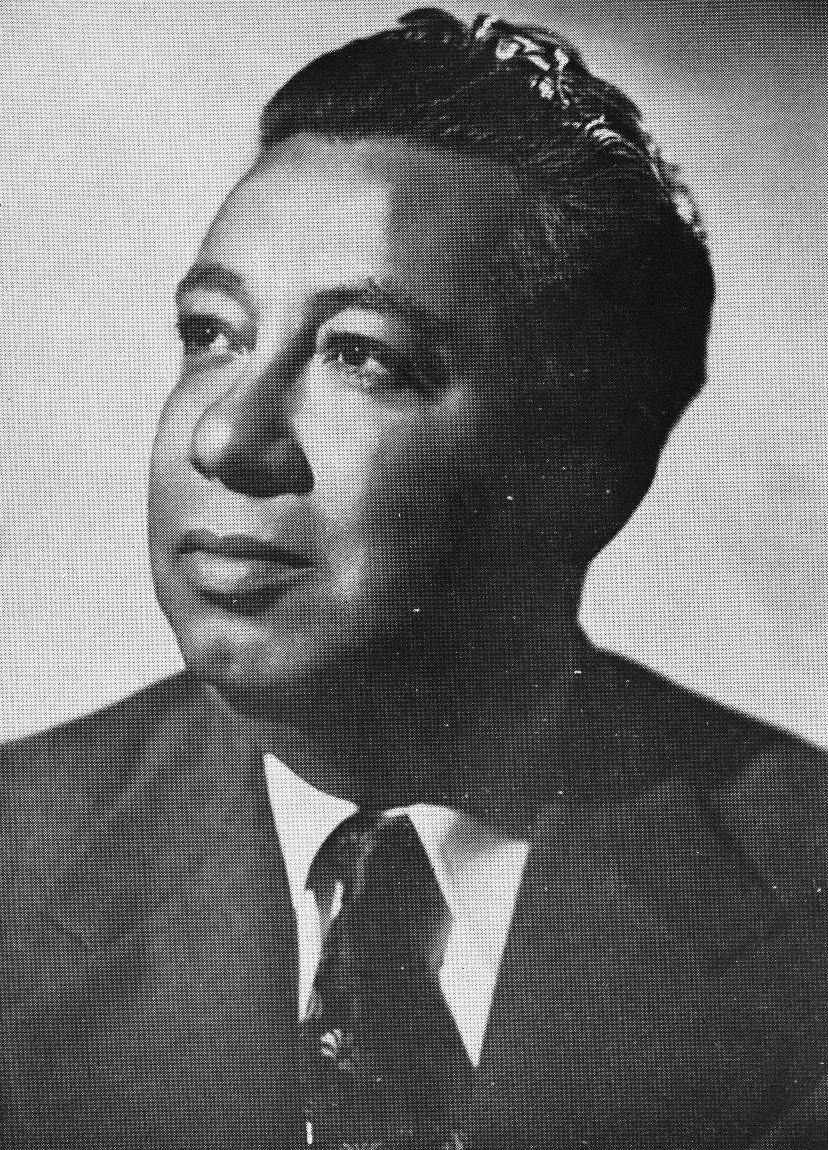
Joaquín Pardavé (photographed in 1954) inspired the design of Dr. Simi.

With the creation of Farmacias Similares, its founder, Víctor González Torres, commissioned the design of a mascot: "a gray-haired character who inspired confidence and calm, gave the impression of being very knowledgeable, but who was also a bit of a rascal". Publicists from La Jornada submitted several sketches, but none satisfied González, who also wanted the character to resemble Susanito Peñafiel, portrayed by Joaquín Pardavé in the 1944 film My Memories of Mexico. After being informed of this additional requirement, Daniel Burgos produced the sketch that González ultimately approved. Arturo Martínez Aviña voiced the character in advertisements from 1997 until his death in 2022.

Dr. Simi is depicted as an elderly, smiling physician with a large moustache and eyebrows, wearing a white doctor's coat. He has a colleague, Dr. Lares, the mascot of SimiPet Care, a chain of veterinary clinics operated by Farmacias Similares. Although the company has not officially confirmed their relationship, Dr. Lares is widely speculated to be Dr. Simi's wife because their surnames form the pun "Simi-Lares".

== Popularity ==
=== Tackles ===
With the rise of YouTube's popularity, a trend emerged in which people dressed as Dr. Simi were tackled while wearing mascot costumes.

=== Plush toys ===
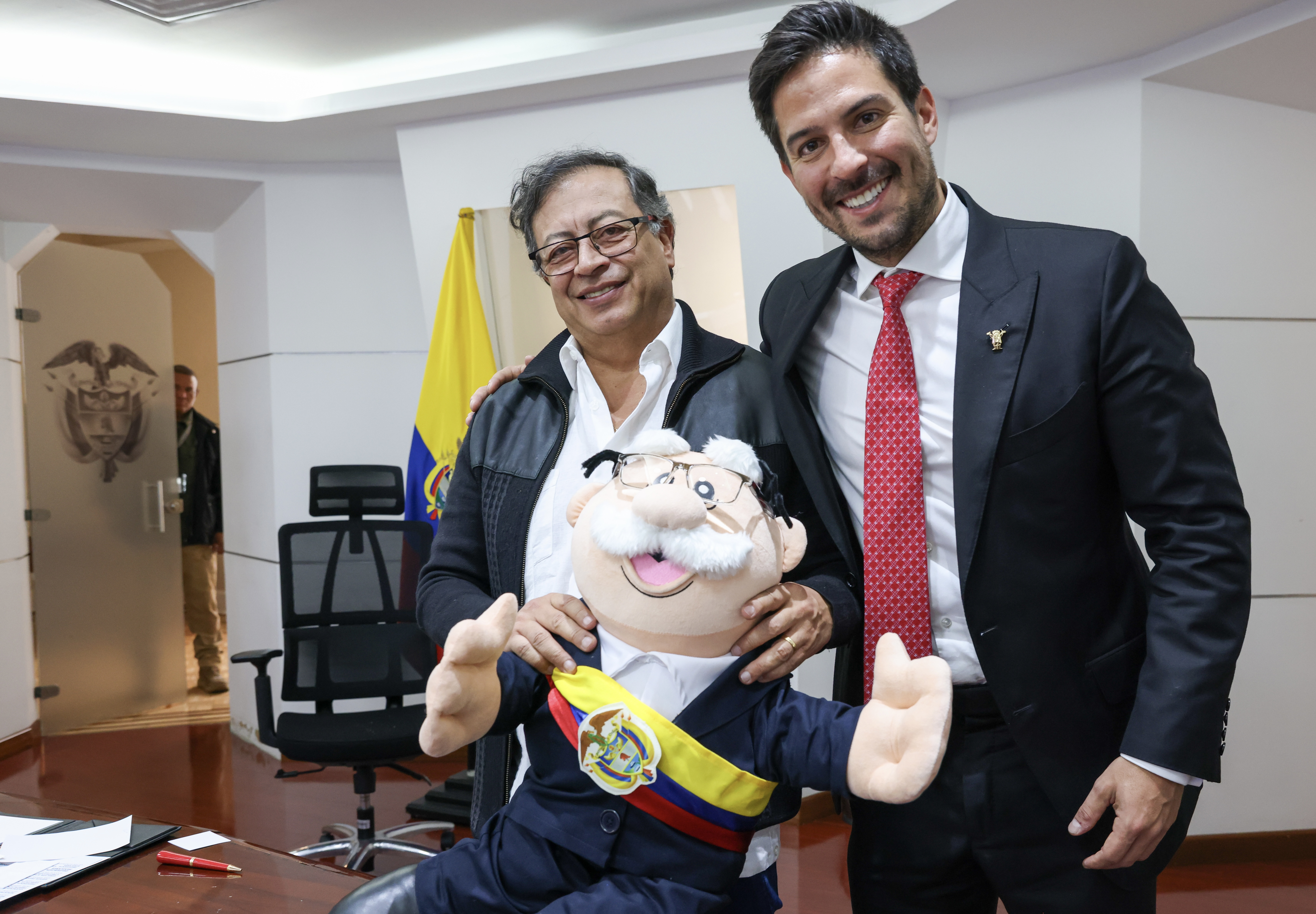
Gustavo Petro, then-president of Colombia, with a personalized Dr. Simi plush toy

Dr. Simi store in Tokyo, Japan

Since 2005, Farmacias Similares has sold Dr. Simi plush toys manufactured by Cinia, a company whose workforce consists predominantly of people with disabilities.

During the 2021 Corona Capital music festival, a fan threw Norwegian singer Aurora a Dr. Simi plush toy onto the stage while singing. According to the fan, she had purchased it before the concert. Although such items were prohibited, security did not ask her to dispose of it, which she interpreted as a sign of good luck. She later decided to throw it to Aurora, who received it positively. The action helped popularize a trend in which fans throw Dr. Simi plush toys to musicians during concerts, often customizing them to resemble the artist receiving them.

Although the trend has been positively received by many musicians, including Adele and Rosalía, who have displayed their collections of Dr. Simi plush toys, others, such as Rubén Albarrán, lead singer of Café Tacuba, have rejected or defaced them. The trend also led to the creation of the Simifest music festival.

=== Simi Colonia ===
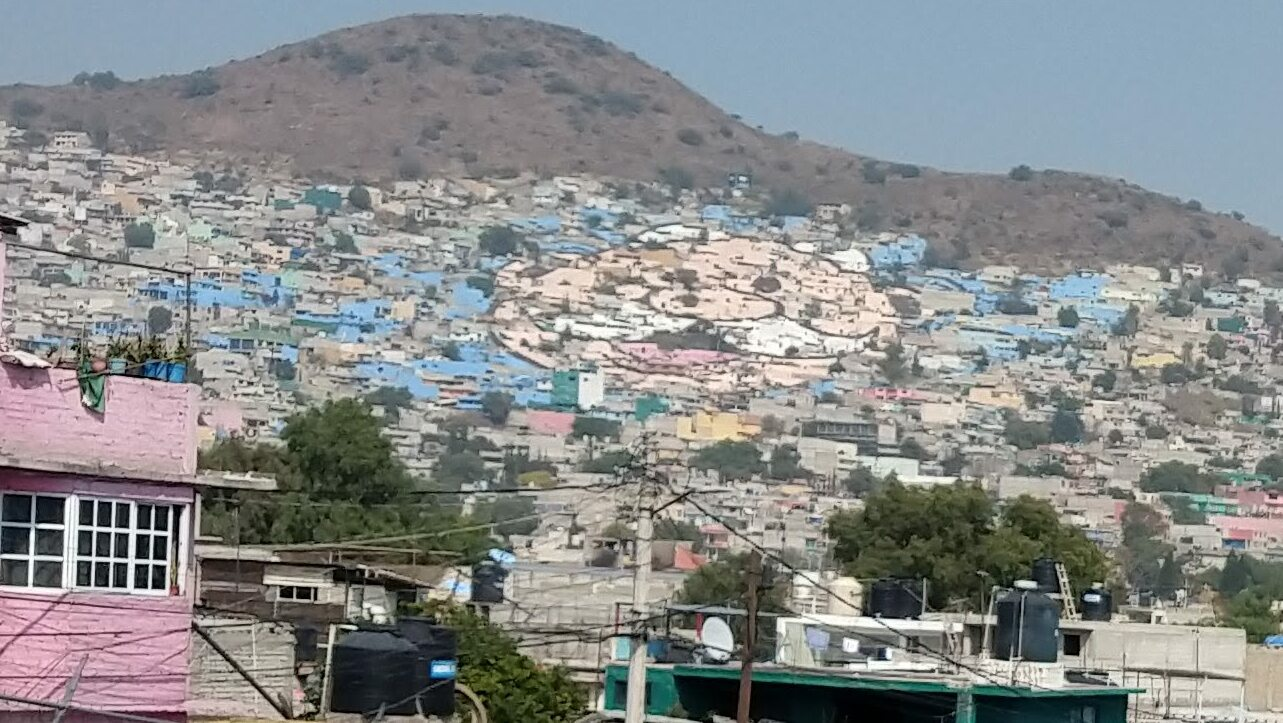
Simi Colonia in 2022

In 2007, Fundación Farmacias Similares selected Colonia San Carlos Cantera, a neighborhood in Ecatepec de Morelos, for a community assistance program. At the time, the neighborhood lacked basic public services, including a reliable water supply, and faced high levels of insecurity. The foundation commissioned artist Oliver Tormenta to create a mural project in which Dr. Simi's logo was painted on the exterior walls of residents' homes. Over a ten-month period, approximately 350 houses were painted. In addition to the mural project, the foundation provides food packages, medical care, assistance for single mothers, and medication for people with diabetes.
