= Ecologist Green Party of Mexico =

Mexican political party

Ecologist Green Party of Mexico Partido Verde Ecologista de México
- English name: Ecologist Green Party of Mexico
- President: Karen Castrejón Trujillo
- Executive Secretary: Pilar Guerrero Rubio
- Technical Secretary: Gabriela Aguilar García
- Senate Leader: Raúl Bolaños Cacho Cué
- Chamber Leader: Carlos Alberto Puente Salas
- Founder: Jorge González Torres
- Founded: 14 May 1993; 33 years ago (national level)
- Headquarters: Loma Bonita 18 Lomas Altas, Miguel Hidalgo, Mexico City, México
- Membership (2026): ▲1,061,319
- Ideology: Green politics; Green conservatism; Environmentalism; Pragmatism
- Political position: Centre to centre-left
- National affiliation: Sigamos Haciendo Historia (since 2023) Former: Alianza por el Cambio (2000); Alianza para Todos (2003); Alianza por México (2006); Compromiso por México (2012); Todos por México (2018–2019); Juntos Haremos Historia (2019–2020)
- Continental affiliation: Federation of the Green Parties of the Americas
- International affiliation: Global Greens
- Colours: Yellow green
- Chamber of Deputies: 61 / 500
- Senate: 14 / 128
- Governorships: 1 / 32
- State congresses: 117 / 1,123

Website
- www.partidoverde.org.mx
- Politics of Mexico; Political parties; Elections; A: The party had supported abortion and gay marriage.

The Ecologist Green Party of Mexico (Spanish: Partido Verde Ecologista de México, pronounced [paɾˈtiðo ˈβeɾðe ekoloˈxista ðe ˈmexiko], PVEM or PVE), also known as the Green Party, is a green political party in Mexico. Founded in 1986, the party is associated with Jorge González Torres and his son Jorge Emilio González Martínez. It has seldom received more than 10% of the vote nationwide, but in the 21st century has joined alliances with different major parties (PAN in the federal elections of 2000, PRI from 2003 to 2018, and most recently Morena from 2019 on).

It is not recognized as a fellow green party by the European Green Party, and is known for its heavy use of advertising, and for (at times) taking stances on issues not usually associated with the international Green movement (such as support for capital punishment and extension of school hours).

== History ==
The party was founded in 1986 under the name Mexican Green Party (Spanish: Partido Verde Mexicano) and its first leader was Jorge González Torres. It participated in the 1991 federal elections for the first time as an independent bloc, under the name Ecologist Party of Mexico (Spanish: Partido Ecologista de México). It did not obtain a sufficient percentage of the vote to obtain official registration at the national level. It obtained its registration in 1993 and in the same year the party changed its name to the current one.

From when it obtained its first subnational registration as a political party on 28 February 1991 until 2011, it was controlled by a single family: its first president was founder Jorge González Torres (a public official and former member of the PRI), who was succeeded in the presidency of the party by his son, Jorge Emilio González Martínez (who served as a senator from 2000–2006 and was nicknamed "the Green Child") in 2001.

The party slowly increased its vote share through the 1990s, finishing in 5th place in the 1994 legislative elections and 4th place in 1997, obtaining its first seats in both the Chamber of Deputies and Senate in the latter.

Starting in 2000 it allegedly adopted the strategy of "siding with the political party most likely to win", and changing its political coloration to match that party. It participated in the 2000 Mexican general election in the Alliance for Change with the National Action Party (PAN), resulting in the successful election of joint presidential candidate Vicente Fox and the obtaining of the most seats in the Chamber of Deputies and the senate between the two parties (although they lacked a majority). The PVEM eventually distanced itself from the PAN and Fox the following year after stating their belief that they were not complying with established agreements on environmental matters.

In the 2003 Mexican legislative election, the party allied with the PRI in 100 of the 300 constituency seats as the Alianza para Todos, with the PVEM winning 17 constituency seats and 14 proportional representation seats in the Chamber of Deputies, and 1 constituency seat and 4 proportional representation seats in the Senate. Initially intending to run its own candidate, Bernardo de la Garza, in the 2006 presidential election, the party eventually withdrew in support of the PRI's candidate Roberto Madrazo, who finished in 3rd place. From this point, the PVEM continued to ally with the PRI for most elections until 2019.

In the 2009 Mexican legislative election, the party campaigned in favor of the death penalty for murderers and kidnappers, the extension of school hours to relieve childcare concerns for working parents, and free medicines. Its support for the death penalty led to its being ejected from a group of international Green Parties that year.

Later, in the 2012 general election, the PRI-PVEM alliance's presidential candidate, Enrique Peña Nieto, was victorious, with the PVEM improving its results in the legislature (taking 34 seats in the Chamber of Deputies out of 500 and nine seats in the Senate out of 128) and entering into a state government for the first time as part of a coalition with the PRI and PANAL in Chiapas, also winning the governorship for the first time under candidate Manuel Velasco Coello. It remained a part of the Chiapas state government until 2018.

In the 2015 election campaign, the Instituto Nacional Electoral or INE (which is responsible for organizing elections) fined the Green Party more than 500 million pesos (approximately US$32 million) for different electoral violations. More than 155,000 Mexicans signed an online petition calling for the INE to revoke the Green party's registration, but Mexico's electoral tribunal declined to do so.

In 2018, PVEM supported the Todos por México coalition, along with PRI and PANAL. José Antonio Meade, the coalition's candidate, came in third in a four-way race, with 16.43% of the vote. PVEM later withdrew from Todos por Mexico and gradually came close to the Andrés Manuel López Obrador government, formally entering the Juntos Haremos Historia coalition in 2019. In December 2020 it founded the successor Juntos Hacemos Historia coalition, together with the National Regeneration Movement and the Labor Party and contested the 2021 Mexican legislative elections with them. The PVEM also won its second gubernatorial election the same year, with Ricardo Gallardo Cardona finishing in first place in San Luis Potosí.

== Ideology ==
The party has been described (by Lorena Rios) as showing "remarkable ideological flexibility", with a raison d'être explained not by concern over pollution and global warming, but by the fact that as a political party in Mexico it receives public financing from the Mexican federal government (it received 7.4 billion pesos, or approximately US$370 million, in financing from 1997 to mid-2021).

The PVEM is still green conservative or conservative in general, but had supported abortion and gay marriage.

The party has been criticized on a few occasions for a perceived lack of true commitment to environmental causes, with the now-defunct Mexico City newspaper El Independiente reporting that during a meeting he held in London with Mexican graduate students, party leader Jorge González Martínez responded to the question of PVEM's programs in defense of the Mexican environment with "Ecology is the least important thing to me. I represent interests", and González Martínez being accused of accepting bribes to overlook construction occurring in protected areas. It allied itself with the MORENA party in 2019, despite the "notorious disregard" for environmentalism and the transition away from carbon fuels by the leader of that party.

The party came out in support of remote work, the creation of special economic zones, and a transition to a semi-presidential system of government in its 2018 manifesto.

== Controversies ==
Among the general criticisms of the party have been that it is "a family firm 'bordering on organised crime'" (Jorge Alcocer Varela), its "'green' is in the branding, not the policy" (Lorena Rios), and that while other parties in Mexico are susceptible to corruption, the Green Party is "corruption turned into a party" (Emilio Lezama in El Universal). Others insist its relative success comes from "out-strategizing" its rivals and giving the public proposals it wants.

=== Pro-death penalty campaign ===
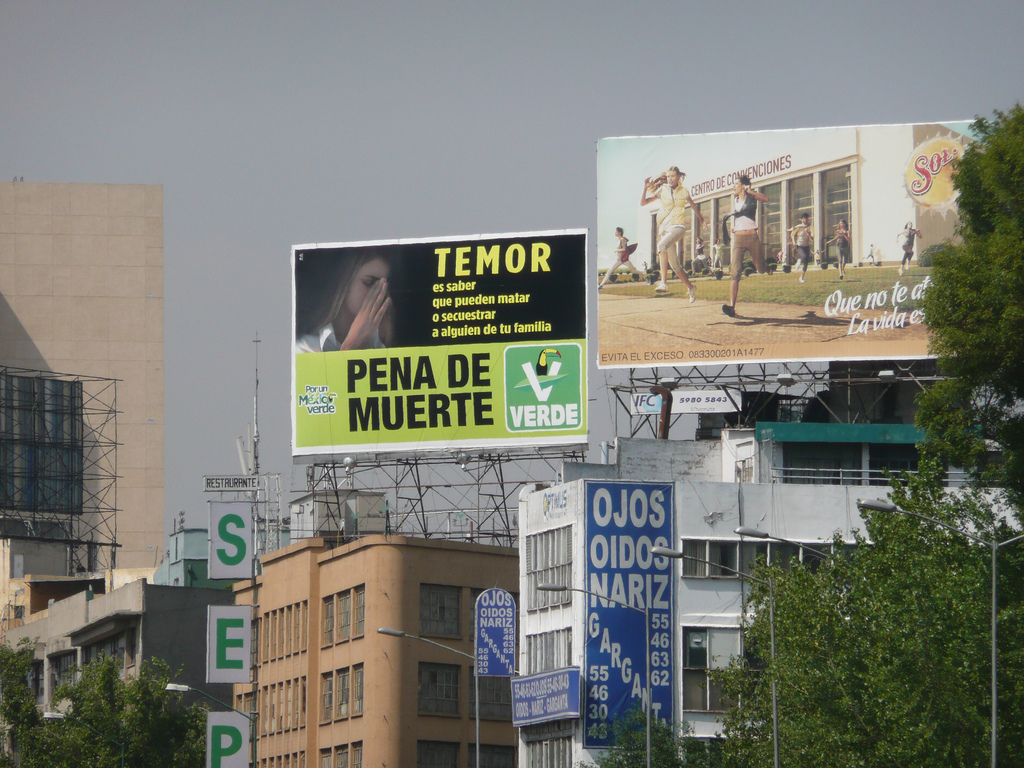
A Green Party billboard promoting the restoration of the death penalty

In 2008, the PVEM initiated an advertising campaign in favor of reintroducing the death penalty in Mexico. This led to the European Green Party's withdrawal of recognition of the PVEM as a legitimate green party.

=== Anti-LGBT rights factions ===
During an interview, PVEM candidate Gamaliel Ramirez verbally attacked an openly gay candidate for Guadalajara mayor and called for criminal laws against homosexuality to be established. In the following days, Ramirez issued a written apology after the party expressed disappointment at his remarks.

While the party has pledged to support LGBT rights issues, its three representatives abstained from a vote on Mexico City granting legal recognition to same-sex couples and opposed the legalization of same-sex marriage in the city.

=== Accusations of corruption and nepotism ===
The PVEM is also widely criticized because its leader from 2001 to 2011, Jorge Emilio González Martínez, was appointed for being the son of former leader Jorge González Torres, and for supporting the political and business agenda of Mexican businessman Víctor González Torres, owner of the Farmacias Similares drugstore franchise and González Martínez's uncle. As of 2021, the father and son retain influence as members of the party's national council. González Martínez was also accused of accepting bribes in exchange for allowing construction in protected areas. A 2004 video of Jorge Emilio Gonzalez appears to show him negotiating a payment in exchange for developing a hotel in Cancun on ecologically sensitive lands. He denied any wrongdoing.

Green Party Senator Arturo Escobar y Vega was stopped in a Chiapas airport prior to the 2009 elections "with $1 million pesos in a Louis Vuitton bag", but denied the money was his and was released.

On 14 June 2021, an anti-corruption group Mexicans Against Corruption and Impunity (MCCI), reported that the Mexican government had detected a scheme in which the 2012–2018 Green Party-run Chiapas state government led by governor Manuel Velasco Coello appeared to have embezzled more than 500 million pesos of public money. However, the federal government had not initiated legal action against any officials who served in the administration, according to an anti-graft group.

The Quintana Roo state branch of PVEM removed its leader, José de la Peña Ruiz de Chávez, for his relationship with the Romanian mafia on 10 February 2021. He kept his position as a member of the Congress of Quintana Roo. José Luis Jonathan Yong, former Public Security director in Cancun (2016–2018) has been implicated. De la Peña Ruiz de Chávez is said to also have ties to Leticia Rodríguez Lara "Doña Lety", leader of the Cancun drug cartel.

=== Unlawful political advertising in movie theaters ===
In January 2015, the National Electoral Institute (INE) ordered the PVEM and cinema chains Cinemex and Cinépolis to cease airing PVEM advertisements on the grounds of fairness in electoral contests. When the PVEM and the theaters did not comply, the INE imposed a fine of MXN$35 million on the PVEM and MXN$7 million on both theater chains. The fine on the PVEM was later increased to MXN$67.1 million.

=== Post-campaign influencer posts ===
In 2015, various media personalities alleged that they had been offered more than MXN$200,000 if they disseminated messages in favor of the PVEM through social networks in the middle of election day, despite a ban on campaigning on that day.

In 2021, a similar incident occurred, and several influencers were fined for illegal posts in favor of PVEM on social media after the period of campaigning had ended. Fer Moreno admitted she had been paid MXN$10,000 (US$493.34) and apologized.

== Electoral history ==
=== Presidential elections ===
Election year	Candidate	# votes	% vote	Result	Note
1994	Jorge González Torres	327,313	0.93	✗ Defeated	
2000					support PAN Candidate; Coalition: Alianza por el Cambio (won)
2006					support PRI Candidate; Coalition: Alianza por México (defeated)
2012					support PRI Candidate; Coalition: Compromiso por México (won)
2018					support PRI Candidate; Coalition: Todos por México (defeated)
2024					support MORENA Candidate; Coalition: Juntos Hacemos Historia (won)

=== Congressional elections ===
==== Chamber of Deputies ====
Election year	Constituency		PR		# of seats	Position	Presidency	Note
Election year	votes	%	votes	%	# of seats	Position	Presidency	Note
1994	470,951	1.4	479,594	1.4	0 / 500	Minority	Ernesto Zedillo	
1997	1,105,688	3.8	1,116,137	3.8	8 / 500	Minority	Ernesto Zedillo	
2000	see: National Action Party				17 / 500	Minority	Vicente Fox	Coalition: Alliance for Change
2003	1,063,741	4.1	1,068,721	4.1	17 / 500	Minority	Vicente Fox	
2006	see: Institutional Revolutionary Party				19 / 500	Minority	Felipe Calderón	Coalition: Alliance for Mexico
2009	2,318,138	6.7	2,326,016	6.7	21 / 500	Minority	Felipe Calderón	
2012	3,045,385	6.44	3,054,718	6.43	34 / 500	Minority	Enrique Peña Nieto	Coalition: Commitment to Mexico
2015	2,740,208	7.57	2,757,170	7.54	47 / 500	Minority	Enrique Peña Nieto	Coalition: PRI-PVEM
2018	1,429,802	2.55	2,695,405	4.79	17 / 500	Majority	Andrés Manuel López Obrador	Coalition: Todos por México
2021	992,320	2.03	2,670,997	5.43	44 / 500	Majority	Andrés Manuel López Obrador	Coalition: Juntos Hacemos Historia
2024	676.092	1.19	4,993,988	8.72	77 / 500	Majority	Claudia Sheinbaum	Coalition: Sigamos Haciendo Historia

==== Senate elections ====
Election year	Constituency		PR		# of seats	Position	Presidency	Note
Election year	votes	%	votes	%	# of seats	Position	Presidency	Note
1994			438,941	1.3	0 / 128	Minority	Ernesto Zedillo	
1997			1,180,04	4.0	1 / 128	Minority	Ernesto Zedillo	
2000	see: National Action Party				5 / 128	Minority	Vicente Fox	Coalition: Alliance for Change
2006	see: Institutional Revolutionary Party				6 / 128	Minority	Felipe Calderón	Coalition: Alliance for Mexico
2012	867,056	1.9	2,881,923	6.1	9 / 128	Minority	Enrique Peña Nieto	Coalition: Commitment to Mexico
2018	1,198,011	2.13	2,528,175	4.46	7 / 128	Minority	Andrés Manuel López Obrador	Coalition: Todos por México
2024	2,298,726	4.03	5,357,959	9.30	14 / 128	Majority	Claudia Sheinbaum	Coalition: Sigamos Haciendo Historia
