= 1997 Mexican legislative election =

- 6 July 1997
- Chamber of Deputies
- All 500 seats in the Chamber of Deputies
Party	Leader	Vote %	Seats	+/–
PRI	Humberto Roque Villanueva	39.09	239	−61
PAN	Felipe Calderón	26.64	121	+2
PRD	Andrés Manuel López Obrador	25.69	125	+54
PVEM	Jorge González Torres	3.81	8	+8
PT	Alberto Anaya	2.58	7	−3
This lists parties that won seats. See the complete results below.
- Senate
- 32 of the 128 seats in the Senate of the Republic
Party	Leader	Vote %	Seats	+/–
PRI	Humberto Roque Villanueva	38.48	76	−19
PAN	Felipe Calderón	26.92	33	+8
PRD	Andrés Manuel López Obrador	25.83	14	+6
PVEM	Jorge González Torres	4.03	1	+1
PT	Alberto Anaya	2.55	1	+1
Independents	–	–	3	+3
This lists parties that won seats. See the complete results below.
Results by Federal entity

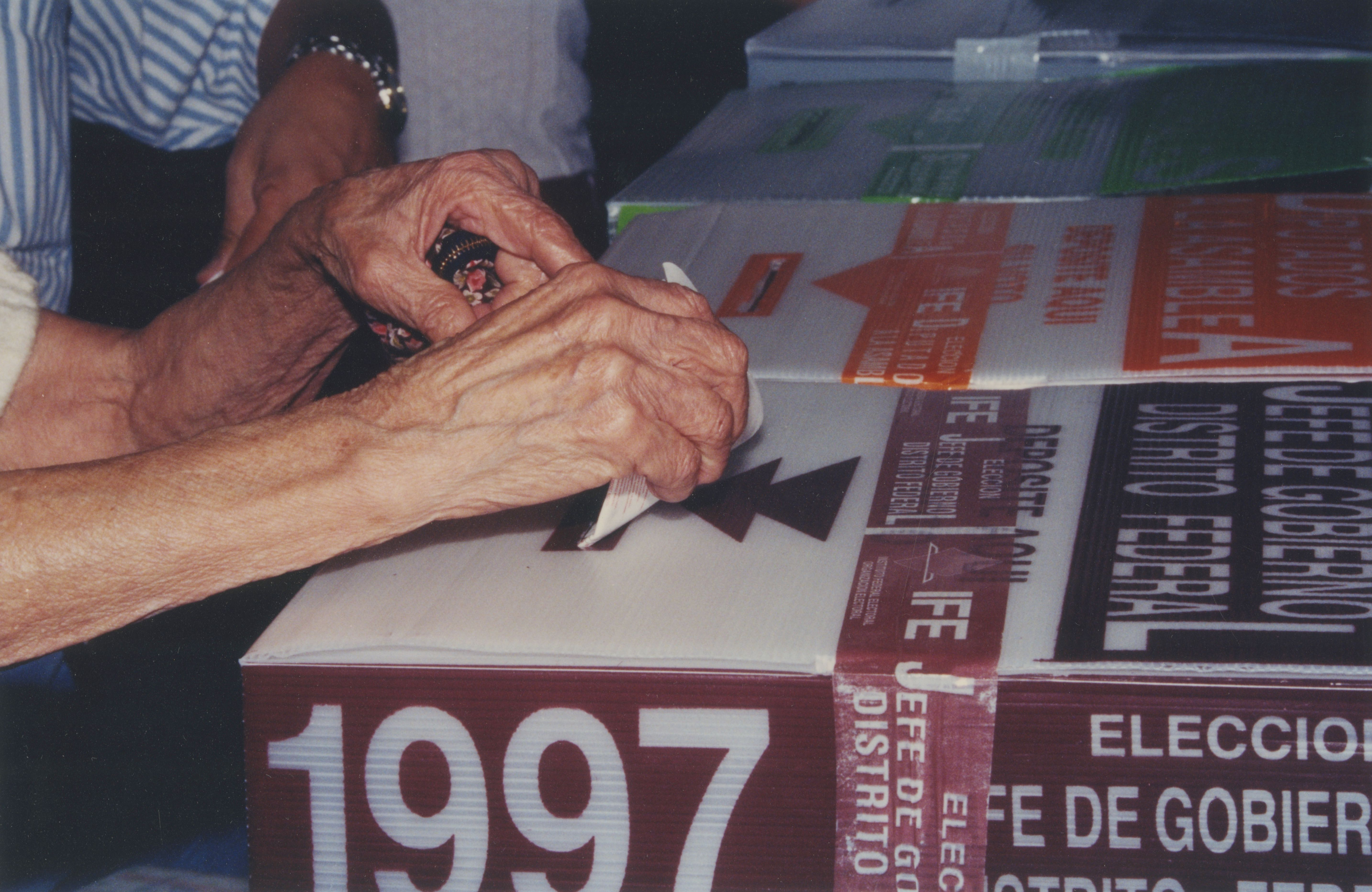
Voting boxes from the elections

Legislative elections were held in Mexico on 6 July 1997. The Institutional Revolutionary Party (PRI) won 239 of the 500 seats in the Chamber of Deputies, the first time it had failed to win a majority. As a result, the leaders of the Party of the Democratic Revolution (PRD) and of the National Action Party (PAN) were able to control Congress and installed PRD member Porfirio Muñoz Ledo as the president of the Chamber of Deputies. At first, the PRI refused to accept the nomination and its parliamentary leader, Arturo Núñez Jiménez, declared it illegal. However, the PRI later accepted the fact and Muñoz Ledo answered the state of the union address of President Ernesto Zedillo.

The Party of the Cardenist Front of National Reconstruction (PFCRN), Popular Socialist Party (PSP) and Mexican Democratic Party (PDM) all lost their legal registration and disappeared, while the Labor Party (PT) and the Ecologist Green Party of Mexico (PVEM) consolidated their support, which turned them into parties who could form coalition governments. Voter turnout was between 57% and 58%.

== Background ==
The political landscape saw great change in the years preceding the 1997 midterm elections. There was a noticeable fragility to the beginning of Ernesto Zedillo's presidential term as the nation was caught up in a sudden economic crisis (dubbed the "December mistake"), which occurred on 19 December 1994, as a result of an unexpected capital flight and a rise in financial speculation. This led to a near-70% devaluation of the national currency. Due to the seriousness of the problems, the prospect of a president resigning was openly discussed for the first time in a nation with a long-standing presidential tradition. A number of erratic decisions in the first year of Zedillo's administration heightened the sense of vulnerability, including the police-military operation against the Zapatistas on 9 February 1995, the backing of the contested governors of Chiapas and Tabasco and the resignation of three secretaries of state in less than six months.

However, Zedillo also reinforced the transition to full democracy:

We Mexicans want a democratic life, at the height of our history, at the height of our diversity; However, we must recognize that democratic advances are still insufficient. The time has come to join our wills without sacrificing our differences; The time has come to unite in the construction of a new democracy that includes a better relationship between citizens and the government, between the states and the Federation; a new ethical code between political contenders and a definitive electoral reform. The time has come when democracy covers all areas of social coexistence.

— Ernesto Zedillo

== Results ==
=== Senate ===
Party	Votes	%	Seats			
Party	Votes	%	Won	Not up	Total	+/–
Institutional Revolutionary Party	11,266,155	38.48	13	63	76	–19
National Action Party	7,881,121	26.92	9	24	33	+8
Party of the Democratic Revolution	7,564,656	25.83	8	6	14	+6
Ecologist Green Party of Mexico	1,180,004	4.03	1	0	1	+1
Labor Party	745,881	2.55	1	0	1	+1
Party of the Cardenist Front of National Reconstruction	337,328	1.15	0	0	0	0
Mexican Democratic Party	193,509	0.66	0	0	0	0
Popular Socialist Party	96,500	0.33	0	0	0	0
Non-registered candidates	16,137	0.06	0	0	0	0
Independents			–	3	3	+3
Total	29,281,291	100.00	32	96	128	0
Valid votes	29,281,291	97.11				
Invalid/blank votes	872,421	2.89				
Total votes	30,153,712	100.00				
Registered voters/turnout	52,208,966	57.76				
Source: Nohlen, IPU

=== Chamber of Deputies ===
Party	Party-list			Constituency			Total seats	+/–
Party	Votes	%	Seats	Votes	%	Seats	Total seats	+/–
Institutional Revolutionary Party	11,438,719	39.09	74	11,305,957	39.09	165	239	–61
National Action Party	7,795,538	26.64	57	7,698,840	26.62	64	121	+2
Party of the Democratic Revolution	7,518,903	25.69	55	7,435,456	25.71	70	125	+54
Ecologist Green Party of Mexico	1,116,137	3.81	8	1,105,688	3.82	0	8	+8
Labor Party	756,125	2.58	6	748,869	2.59	1	7	–3
Party of the Cardenist Front of National Reconstruction	328,872	1.12	0	325,465	1.13	0	0	0
Mexican Democratic Party	193,903	0.66	0	191,779	0.66	0	0	0
Popular Socialist Party	99,109	0.34	0	98,176	0.34	0	0	0
Independents	15,815	0.05	0	15,638	0.05	0	0	0
Total	29,263,121	100.00	200	28,925,868	100.00	300	500	0
Valid votes	29,263,121	97.16		28,925,868	97.16			
Invalid/blank votes	856,732	2.84		845,803	2.84			
Total votes	30,119,853	100.00		29,771,671	100.00			
Registered voters/turnout	52,208,966	57.69		52,208,966	57.02			
Source: Nohlen, Diario Oficial
