= Jorge González Torres =

Mexican politician

Jorge González Torres (born in 1942 in Mexico City) is a Mexican politician, founder of the Ecologist Green Party of Mexico. He was also the co-president of the Federation of Green Parties of the Americas.
