= Coacalco de Berriozábal =

Coordinates: 19°38′00″N 99°05′35″W

Coacalco de Berriozábal Coacalco
- Municipality
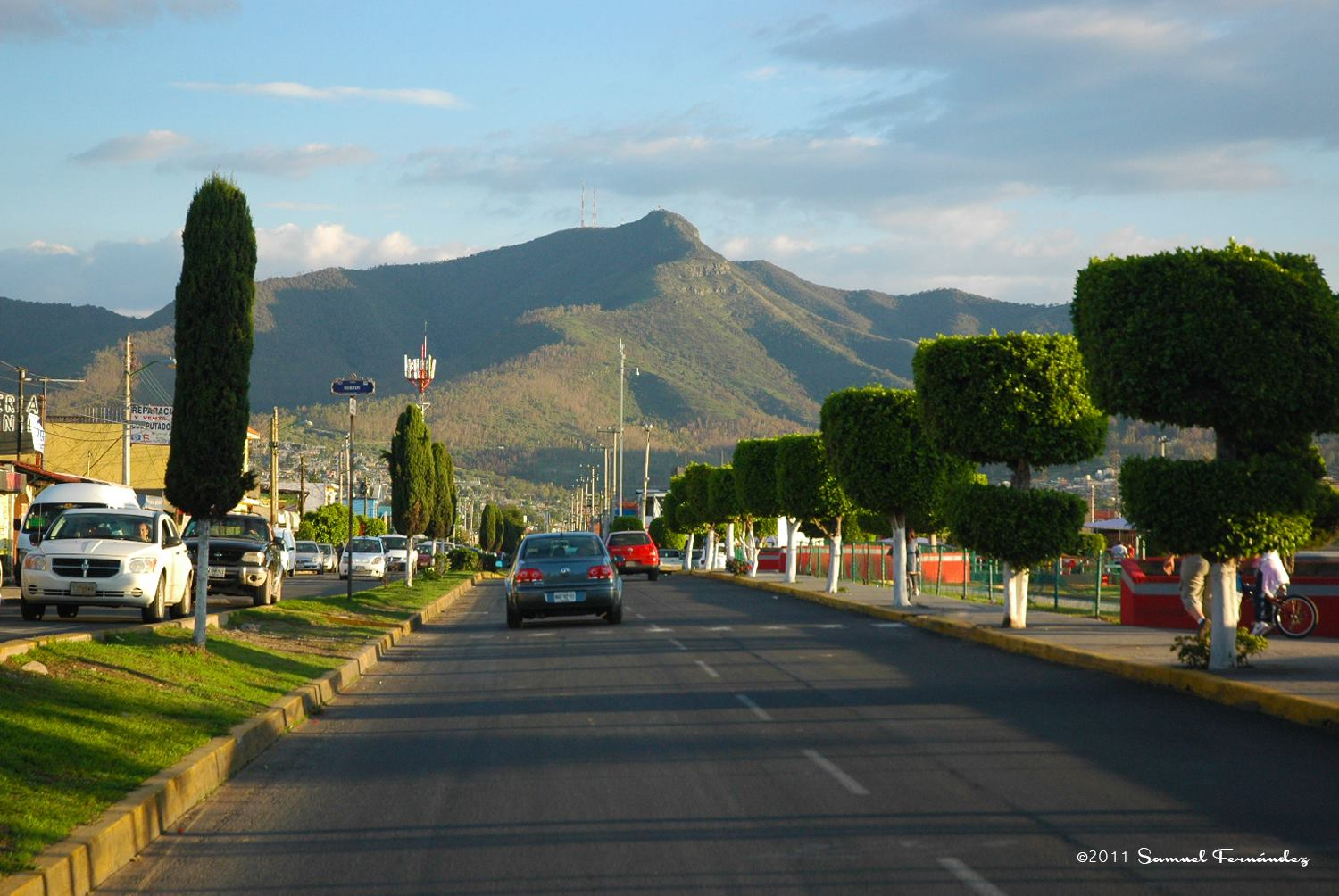
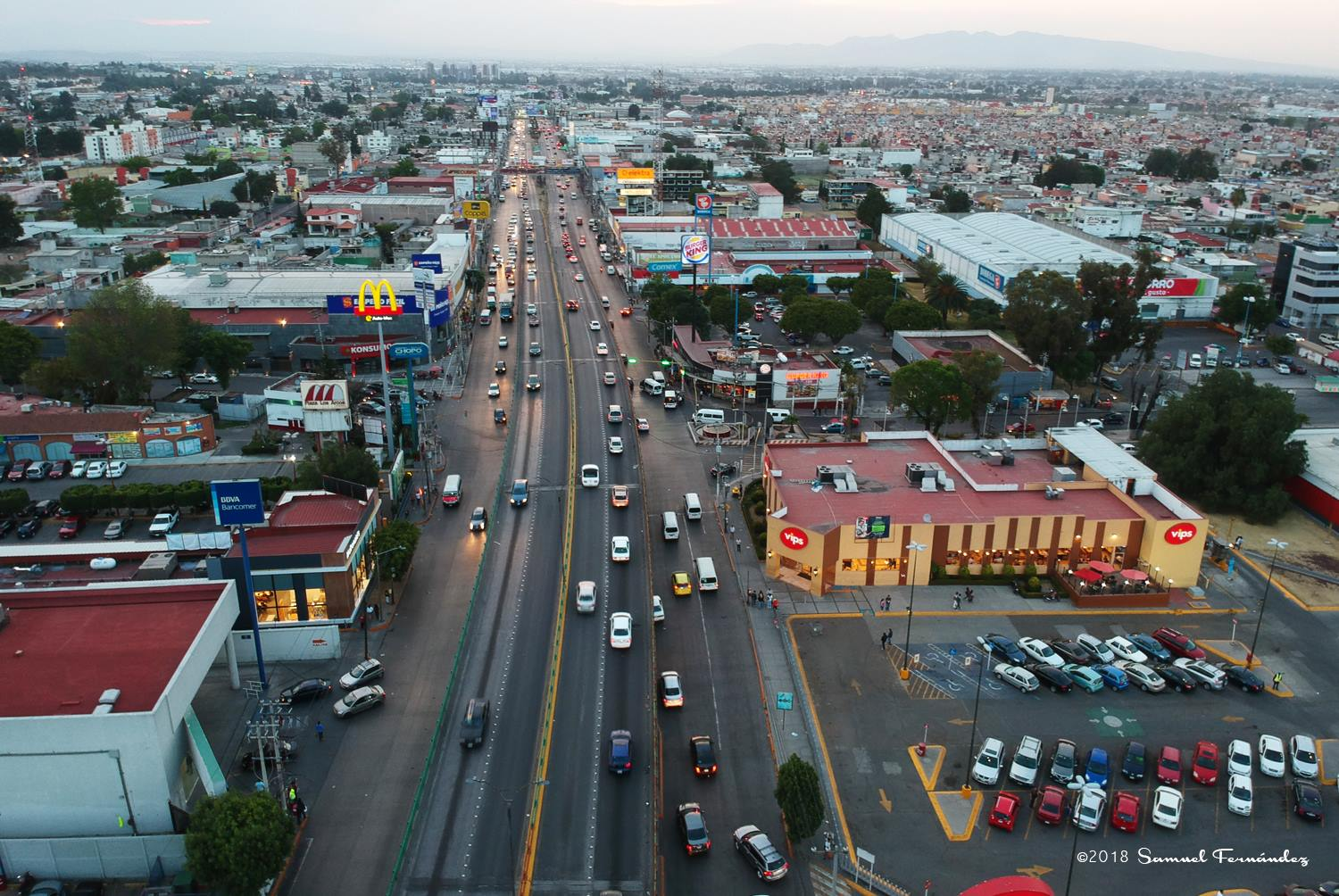
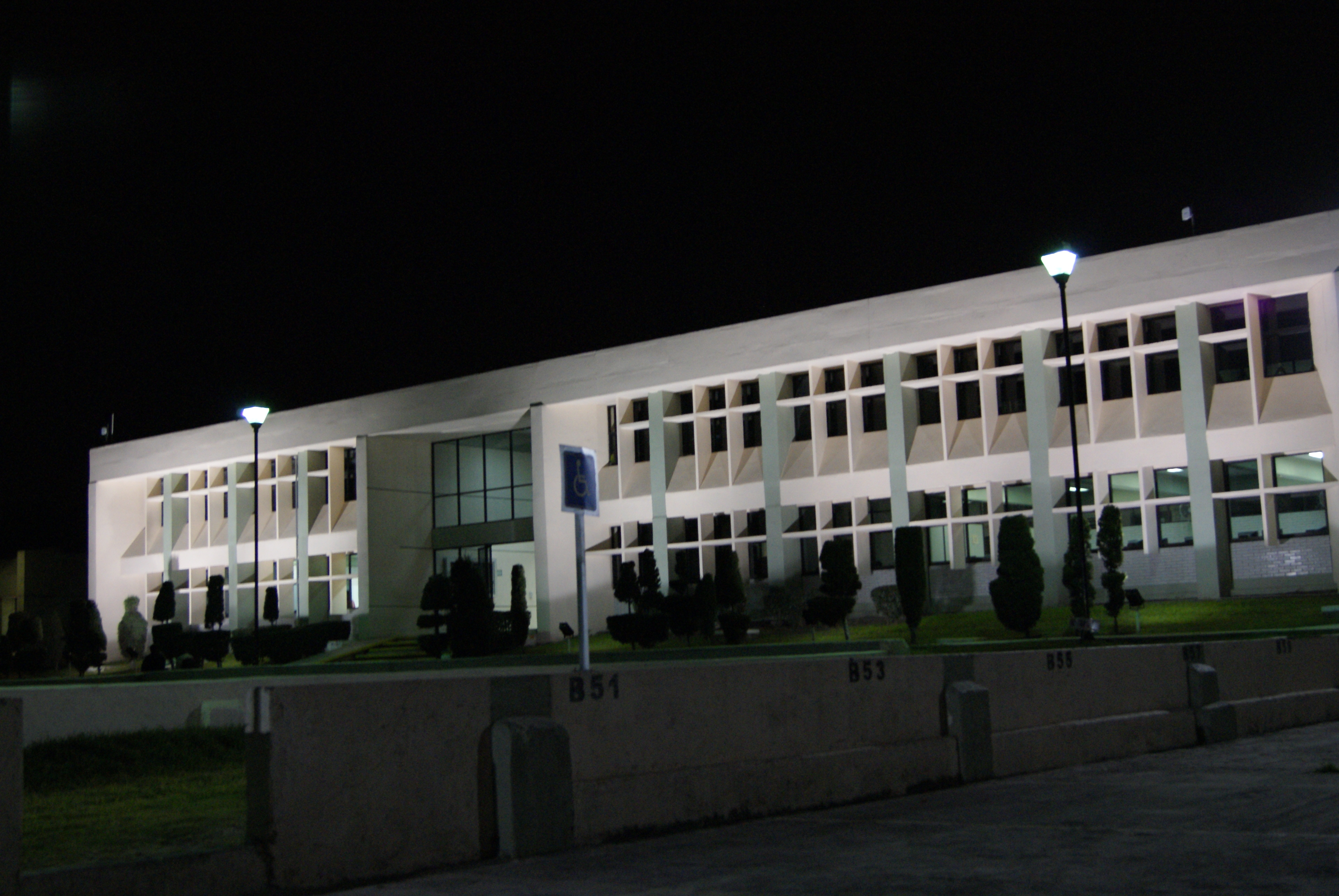
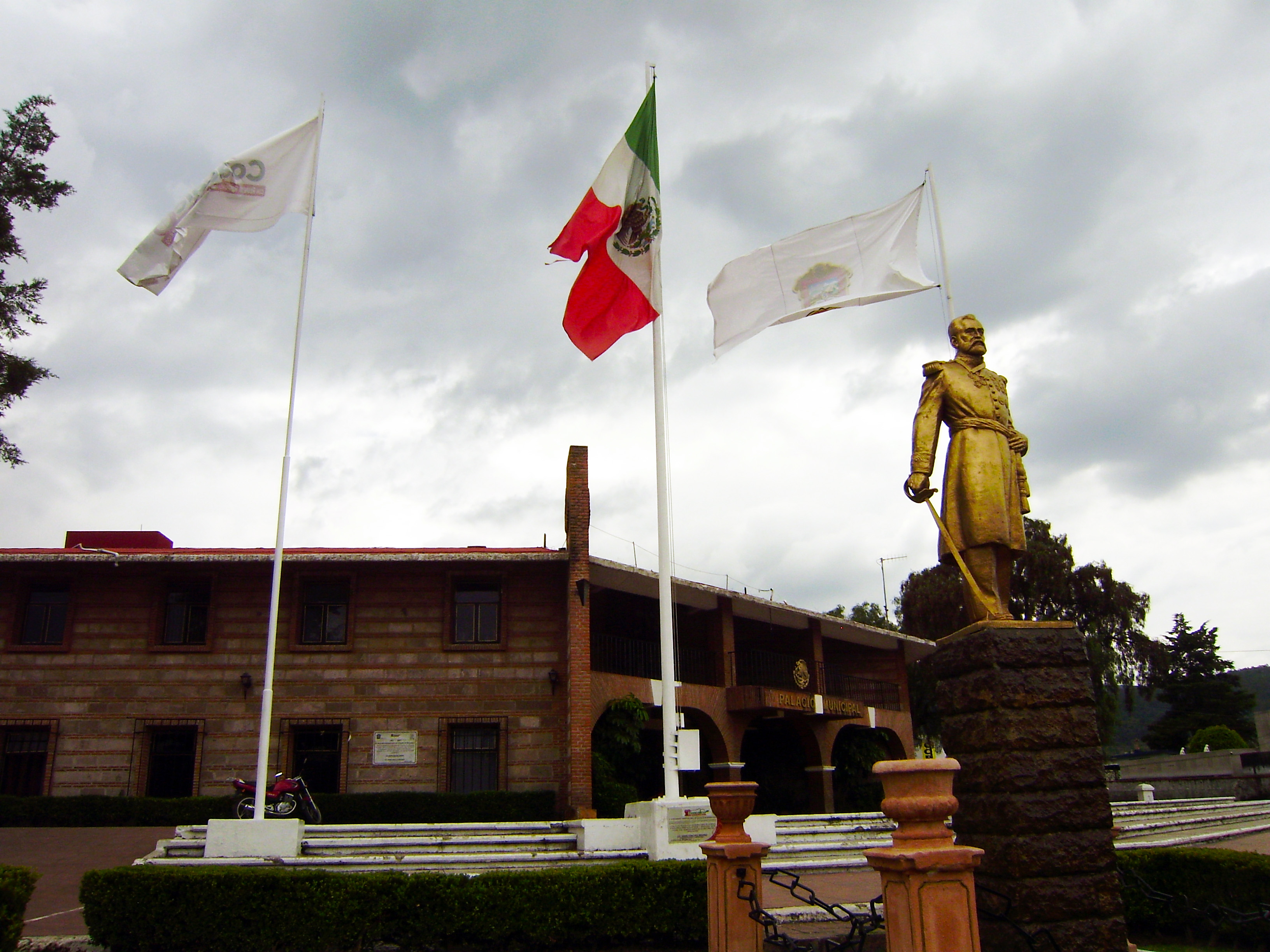
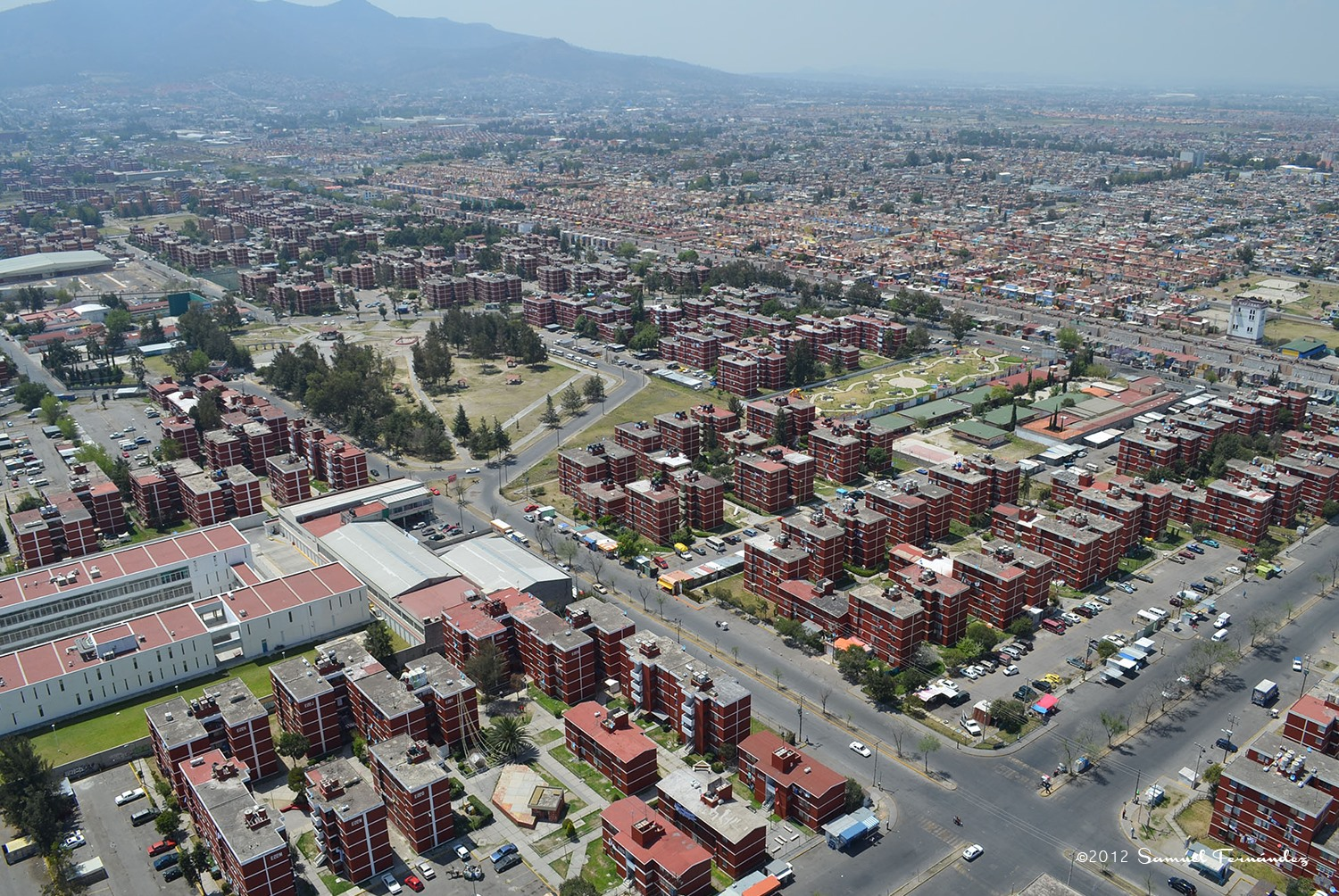
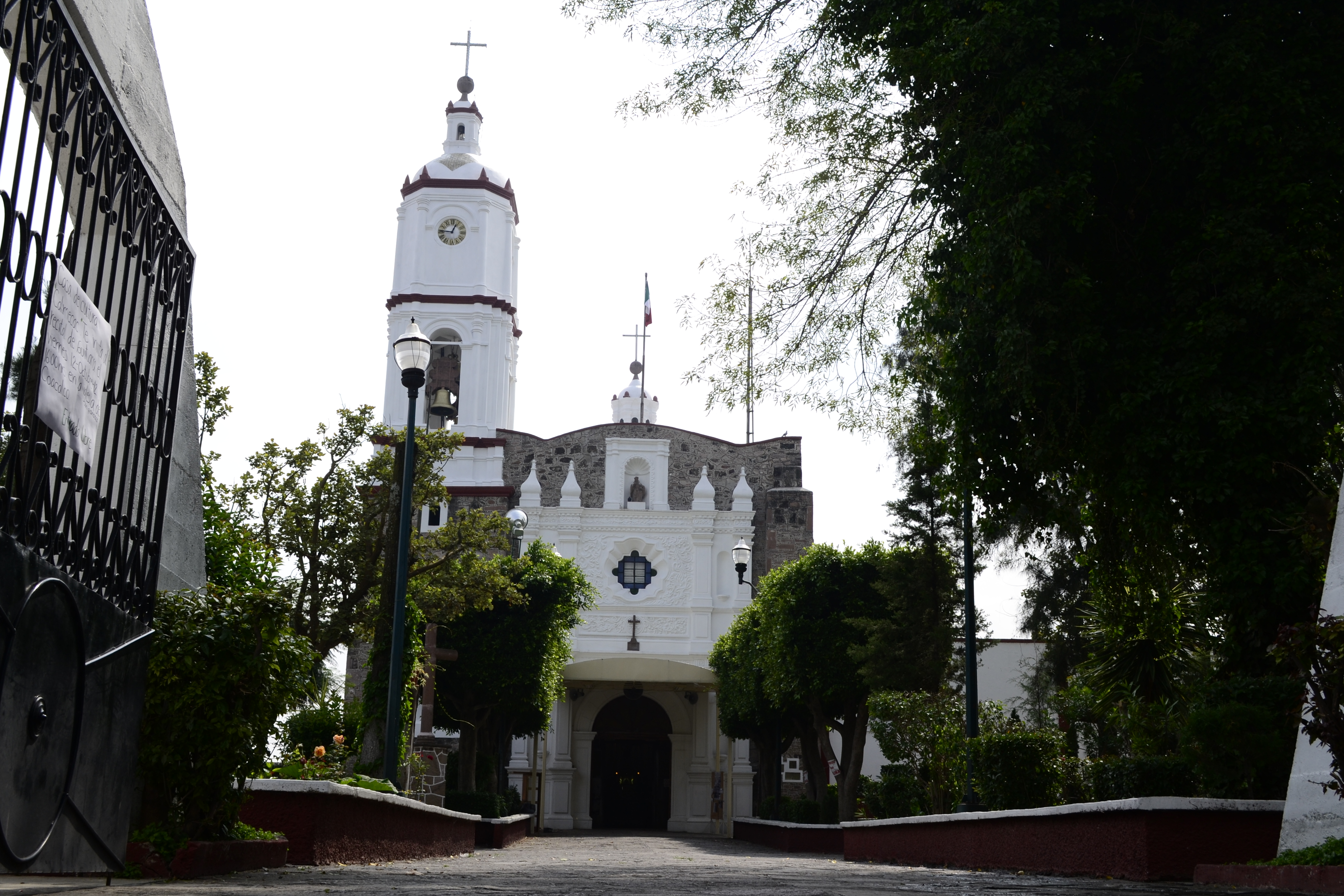
- Clockwise, from top: Sierra de Guadalupe, Tecnológico de Estudios Superiores, Colonia San Rafael, San Francisco de Asís Parish, Municipal palace, Colonia Villa de las Flores

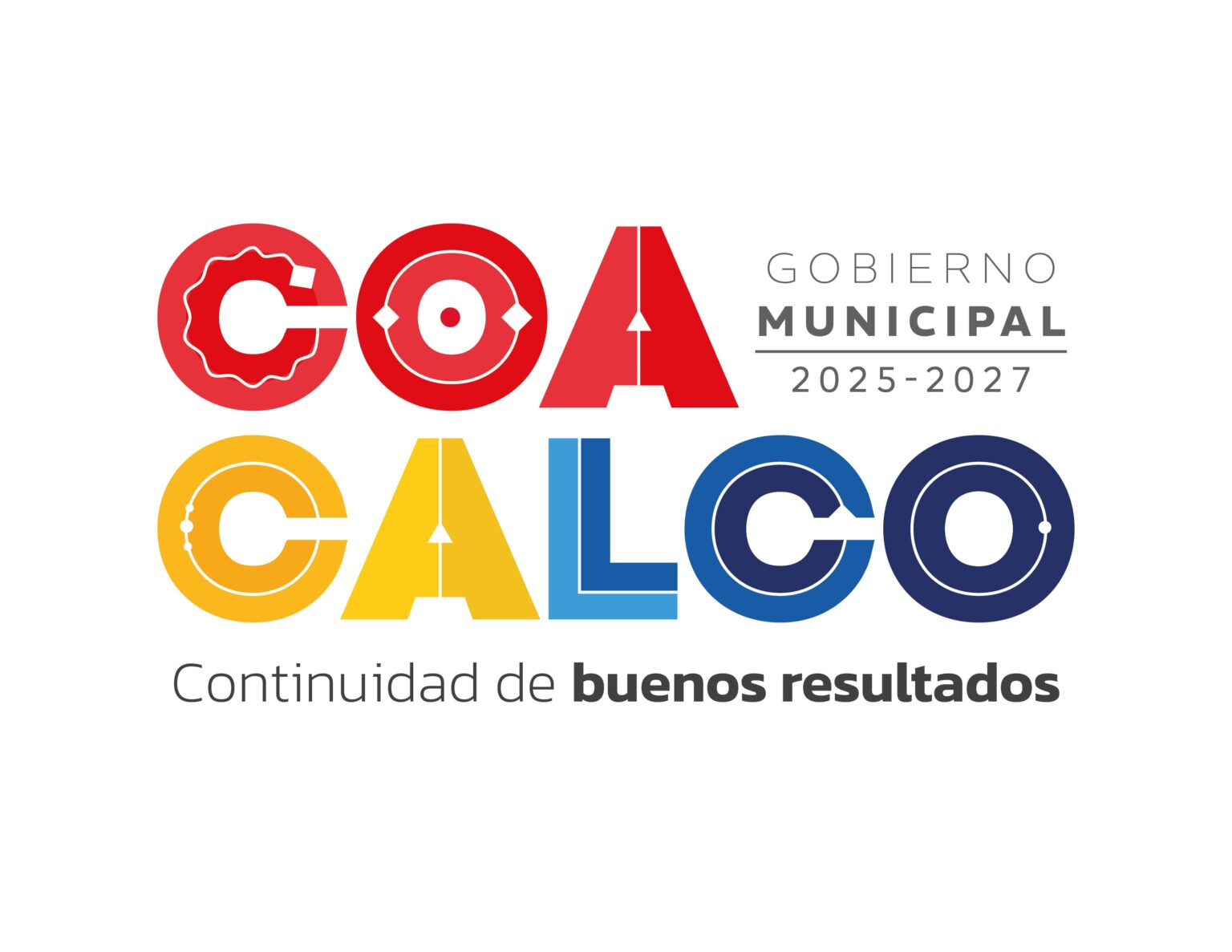
- Seal Coat of arms
- Motto: Continuidad de buenos resultados (Continuity of good results)
- Anthem: Himno a Coacalco
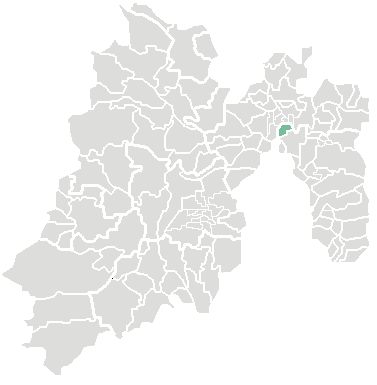
- Country: Mexico
- State: Mexico
- Founded: 850
- Municipal status: 1862

Government
  - Municipal president: David Sánchez Isidoro (Va por México; 2025–2027)

Area
  - Municipality: 35.5 km^{2} (13.7 sq mi)
  - Land: 31.95 km^{2} (12.34 sq mi)
  - Water: 3.55 km^{2} (1.37 sq mi)
- Elevation (of seat): 2,257 m (7,405 ft)

Population (2020)
  - Municipality: 293,444
  - Estimate (2026): 302,817
  - Rank: 65th in Mexico
  - Density: 9,184/km^{2} (23,790/sq mi)
  - Seat: 293,245
  - Demonym: Coacalquense
- Time zone: UTC-6 (Central (US Central))
- Postal code (of seat): 55700
- Area code: 55
- Website: http://www.coacalco.gob.mx/

Coacalco de Berriozábal (Spanish pronunciation; simply known as Coacalco) is one of 125 municipalities in the State of Mexico, Mexico. The municipal seat is the city of San Francisco Coacalco. The municipality lies in the Greater Mexico City conurbation, north of Mexico City. The municipal seat is San Francisco Coacalco and the municipality is named after Felipe Berriozábal (1829–1900), a Mexican politician and military leader.

The word Coacalco comes from the Nahuatl cōātl ("snake"), calli ("home"), and the suffix -co ("at"), thus meaning "at the house of the snake", a name that was first recorded in 1320.

== History ==
Coacalco de Berriozábal is part of the Valley of Mexico. It is located at the site of what was once the city-state of Xaltocan. Between 850 and 1521, the municipality was inhabited by Toltec people. In the 18th and 19th centuries, the main economic activities were agriculture, husbandry and salt harvesting. On 12 February 1862, General Felipe Berriozábal, then-governor of the state, signed an order that declared Coacalco an independent municipality, ending a 343-year-old dependency of Ecatepec.

== Economy ==
The economy of Coacalco has changed since the 1970s, having switched from being primarily agricultural and rural to an urban industrial area. Since the 2000s, the municipality has become one of the principal commercial districts of the northern part of the metropolitan area.

== Population ==
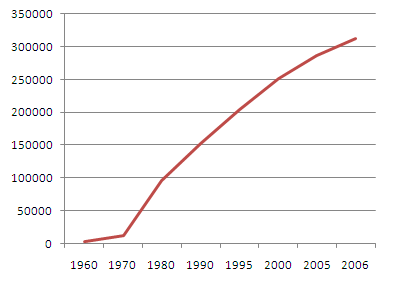
Increase of the population from the 1970s to the 2000s

Located near Mexico City, Coacalco's population has increased by more than 200,000 since 1970. In 2005, the city had a population of 252,555 people; by 2010, the population grew to 278,064 inhabitants. As of 2015, the total population was 284,462 inhabitants. By 2020, the total population soared to 293,444 inhabitants.

In the 2005 Mexican Human Development Index (HDI) statistic, Coacalco was rated as the tenth best place to live in the country.

=== Towns and villages ===
In 2010, the geographical subdivisions and their respective population were:

Name	Population (2010)
Basurero Municipal (La Aurora)	99
Bosques de Coacalco	3
Propiedad Díaz	3
San Francisco Coacalco	277,959

=== Sister cities ===
The sister cities of Coacalco de Berriozábal are:

- Valle de Chalco, State of Mexico (2012).
- Tangamandapio, Michoacán (2019).

=== Notable people ===
Notable residents include:

- Daga (b. 1987), Mexican wrestler.
- Hologram, Mexican wrestler.
- Erik Pimentel (b. 1990), Mexican footballer.
- Francisco Sierra (b. 1987), Mexican boxer.

== See also ==
- Cosmopol, a shopping center in the municipality
- San Francisco de Asís Parish (Coacalco de Berriozábal)
