= List of political parties in Mexico =

This article lists political parties in Mexico.

Mexico has a multi-party system, with eight nationally registered political parties and number of others that operate locally in one or more states.

== National parties ==
Mexico has eight nationally recognized political parties by the National Electoral Institute.

Under Mexican law, parties are listed in the order in which they were first registered, thus:

Party	Abbr.	Founded	Position	Ideology	Leader	Representation	
Party	Abbr.	Founded	Position	Ideology	Leader	Senators	Deputies
National Action Party; Partido Acción Nacional	PAN	1939	Centre-right to right-wing	National conservatism; Christian democracy	Jorge Romero Herrera	21 / 128	69 / 500
Institutional Revolutionary Party; Partido Revolucionario Institucional	PRI	1929 (PNR); 1938 (PRM); 1946 (PRI)	Centre to centre-right	Catch-all politics	Alito Moreno	13 / 128	37 / 500
Ecologist Green Party of Mexico; Partido Verde Ecologista de México	PVEM	1986 (PVM); 1991 (PEM); 1993 (PVEM)	Centre to centre-left	Green politics; Green conservatism	Karen Castrejón Trujillo	14 / 128	61 / 500
Labor Party; Partido del Trabajo	PT	1990	Left-wing to far-left	Socialism; Maoism; Socialism of the 21st century	Alberto Anaya	6 / 128	49 / 500
Citizens' Movement; Movimiento Ciudadano	MC	1999 (CpD); 2002 (CON); 2011 (MC)	Centre-left	Social democracy; Social liberalism; Progressivism	Jorge Máynez	6 / 128	29 / 500
National Regeneration Movement; Movimiento Regeneración Nacional	Morena	2014	Centre-left to left-wing	Social democracy; Anti-neoliberalism; Left-wing populism; Left-wing nationalism	Ariadna Montiel	66 / 128	254 / 500
Building Societies of Peace; Construyendo Sociedades de Paz	PAZ	2026	Right-wing	Conservatism; Christian right	Hugo Eric Flores Cervantes; Armando González Escoto	0 / 128	0 / 500
We Are; Somos	Somos	2026	Centre to centre-left	Progressivism	Guadalupe Acosta Naranjo	0 / 128	0 / 500

== Other political parties, not registered ==
(Mexico) National parties
- Current
- PAN
- PRI
- PT
- PVEM
- MC
- Morena
- PAZ
- Somos
- Defunct or local only
- PLM
- PNR
- PRM
- PNM
- PP
- PPS
- PARM
- PFCRN
- CON
- PANAL
- PSD
- PES
- PES
- PRD

- Communist Party of Mexico (far-left, not officially registered as party, cannot compete in elections)
- Communist Party of Mexico (Marxist–Leninist) (far-left, not officially registered as party, cannot compete in elections)
- Communists' Party (far-left, not officially registered as party, cannot compete in elections)
- Popular Socialist Party of Mexico (far-left, not officially registered as party, cannot compete in elections)
- Popular Socialist Party (far-left, not officially registered as party, cannot compete in elections)
- Progressive Social Networks (Centre-left, not officially registered as party, cannot compete in elections)
- Force for Mexico (Centre-left, not officially registered as party, cannot compete in elections)
- Nationalist Front of Mexico (far-right, not officially registered as party, cannot compete in elections)
- National Synarchist Union (far-right, not officially registered as party, cannot compete in elections)
- Autonomous Region Party ("Unification of the northeast")
- Socialist Convergence (Convergencia Socialista - CS) (far-left, not officially registered as party, cannot compete in elections)
- Red Sun - People's Movement (Corriente del Pueblo - Sol Rojo) (Far-left, Cannot compete in elections)
- Nationalist Socialist Party Of Mexico, Spanish- Partido Nacional-Socialista de México (far-right not officially registered as party, cannot compete in elections)
- Cyber Political Party (right-wing, not officially registered as party)
- National Hope Party, Spanish- Partido Esperanza Nacional (right-wing, not officially registered as party, cannot compete in elections)
- Mexico First Party (far-right, not officially registered as party, cannot compete in elections)
- México Libre (centre-right, not officially registered as party, cannot compete in elections)
- Mexican Pirate Party, Spanish- Partido Pirata Mexicano (Syncretic, not officially registered as party, cannot compete in elections)

=== Local parties ===
Local parties are registered with the Electoral Institute of each Mexican state according to their own criteria and regulations, which may differ from those of INE but maintaining a national relation due to the highest court in the law of political parties, the SCJN. This list is complete as of 2020.

- Democratic Unity of Coahuila (Unidad Democrática de Coahuila, Coahuila)
- Morelos First Party (Por Morelos al Frente), 2018
- Popular Awareness Party (Partido Conciencia Popular, San Luis Potosí)
- Uniting Wills We Can Build (Sumando Voluntades Podemos Construir, Morelos, registered for 2021 Mexican legislative election)
- More, More Social Support (Más Más Apoyo Social, Morelos, registered for 2021 elections)
- Morelos Progresses (Morelos Progresa, registered for 2021 elections)
- Social Alternative Movement (Movimiento Alternativa Social, Morelos, registered for 2021 elections)
- Citizen Welfare (Bienestar Ciudadano, Morelos, registered for 2021 elections)
- Morelense Political Renewal (Renovación Política Morelense, registered for 2021 elections)
- Strength, Work and Unit for the Timely Rescue of Morelos (Fuerza, Trabajo y Unidad por el Rescate Oportuno de Morelos, registered for 2021 elections)
- Morelos Force (Morelos Fuerza, registered for 2021 elections)
- New Alliance (Partido Nueva Alianza, PANAL; active in several states)
- Party of the Democratic Revolution (Partido de la Revolución Democrática, PRD; active in 13 states)

== Former parties ==
During the 19th century the two most important parties were the Liberals (Liberales) and the Conservatives (Conservadores).

- Liberal Party (1822–1867 de facto)
- Conservative Party (1849–1867)
- Mexican Liberal Party (1905–1918)
- Progressive Constitutionalist Party (1910–1929)
- Socialist Workers Party (1917–1981)
- Workers Party of Acapulco (Guerrero) (1919–1923)
- Laborist Party (PLM; 1919–1929)
- Mexican Communist Party (1917–1989)
- National Agrarian Party (PNA; 1920–1929)
- Marxist Workers Bloc of Mexico (1937–1940)
- Revolutionary Party of National Unification (PRUN; 1939–1940)
- Popular Force Party (1945–1948)
- Federation of Parties of the Mexican People (FPPM; 1945–1954)
- Popular Socialist Party (PPS; 1948–1997)
- Nationalist Party of Mexico (PNM; 1951–1964)
- Authentic Party of the Mexican Revolution (PARM; 1954–2000)
- Movement of National Liberation (1961–1964)
- Workers' Socialist Party (PST; 1975–1987)
- Mexican Democratic Party (PDM; 1979–1997)
- Workers' Revolutionary Party (1979–1996)
- Social Democratic Party (PSD; 1980–1981)
- Unified Socialist Party of Mexico (PSUM; 1981–1987)
- Mexican Workers' Party (PMT; 1984–1987)
- Mexican Socialist Party (1987–1989)
- Party of the Cardenist Front of National Reconstruction (PFCRN; 1987–1997)
- Socialist Convergence (1996–2009)
- Party of the Nationalist Society (PSN; 1998–2003)
- Social Alliance Party (PAS; 1998–2003)
- Democratic Center Party of Mexico (PCD; 1999–2000)
- Social Democracy (1999–2000)
- Alliance for Yucatan Party (Partido Alianza por Yucatán, Yucatán) (1999-2010)
- Colima Democratic Association (2001–2012)
- Socialist Party of Mexico (2001-2013)
- Citizen Force Party (2002–2003)
- Mexican Liberal Party (2002–2003)
- Social Democratic Party (2005–2009)
- México Posible (2002–2003)
- Humanist Party (2014–2015)
- Social Encounter Party (PES; 2006–2018)
- Solidarity Encounter Party (PES; 2020–2021)
- Force for Mexico (2020–2021)
- Progressive Social Networks (2020–2021)
- Party of the Democratic Revolution (PRD; 1989–2024)

== See also ==
- National Political Association
- Liberalism in Mexico
- Politics of Mexico
- Lists of political parties
