= 2003 Mexican legislative election =

Legislative elections were held in Mexico on 6 July 2003. Although the National Action Party received the most votes, the Institutional Revolutionary Party won 224 of the 500 seats. Voter turnout was only 41%.

According to polls, many voters were disappointed in President Vicente Fox for not fulfilling his campaign promises to create millions of jobs upon his election in July 2000, even though his approval ratings remained high. Voters were reportedly dissatisfied with the government's incapacity to push through his major reform proposals in a divided Congress, as the president's plans were virtually entirely thwarted by the opposition Institutional Revolutionary Party (PRI), which held the majority in both Houses. With 206 members in the House, Fox's party was the second largest, but it was unable to pass legislation that would have increased private involvement in the power sector and increased spending on social services by taxing food and medication. While admitting that there were no new jobs created, President Fox and his advisors maintained that they had tried every resource available.

With its campaign slogan, "Remove the brake on change!" the National Action Party (PAN) appeared to be more critical of PRI politicians than of the general public, according to observers. Up until Fox was elected president in 2000, the PRI had ruled Mexico without interruption for 71 years. After two years of political inaction in Congress, Fox and Roberto Madrazo Pintado, the leader of the PRI, promised to work toward agreement following the elections.

Before the election, Fox announced new collaborative public-private investment projects across the nation to boost economic growth, and his top advisors met with US officials to unveil a slew of initiatives aimed at luring investment into the majority of Mexican jobs. The election financing scandals that both major parties faced centered around other significant campaign issues.

On 29 August 2003, Juan de Dios Castro Lozano (PAN) was elected as the new President of the Chamber of Deputies.

== Campaigns ==
=== National Action Party ===
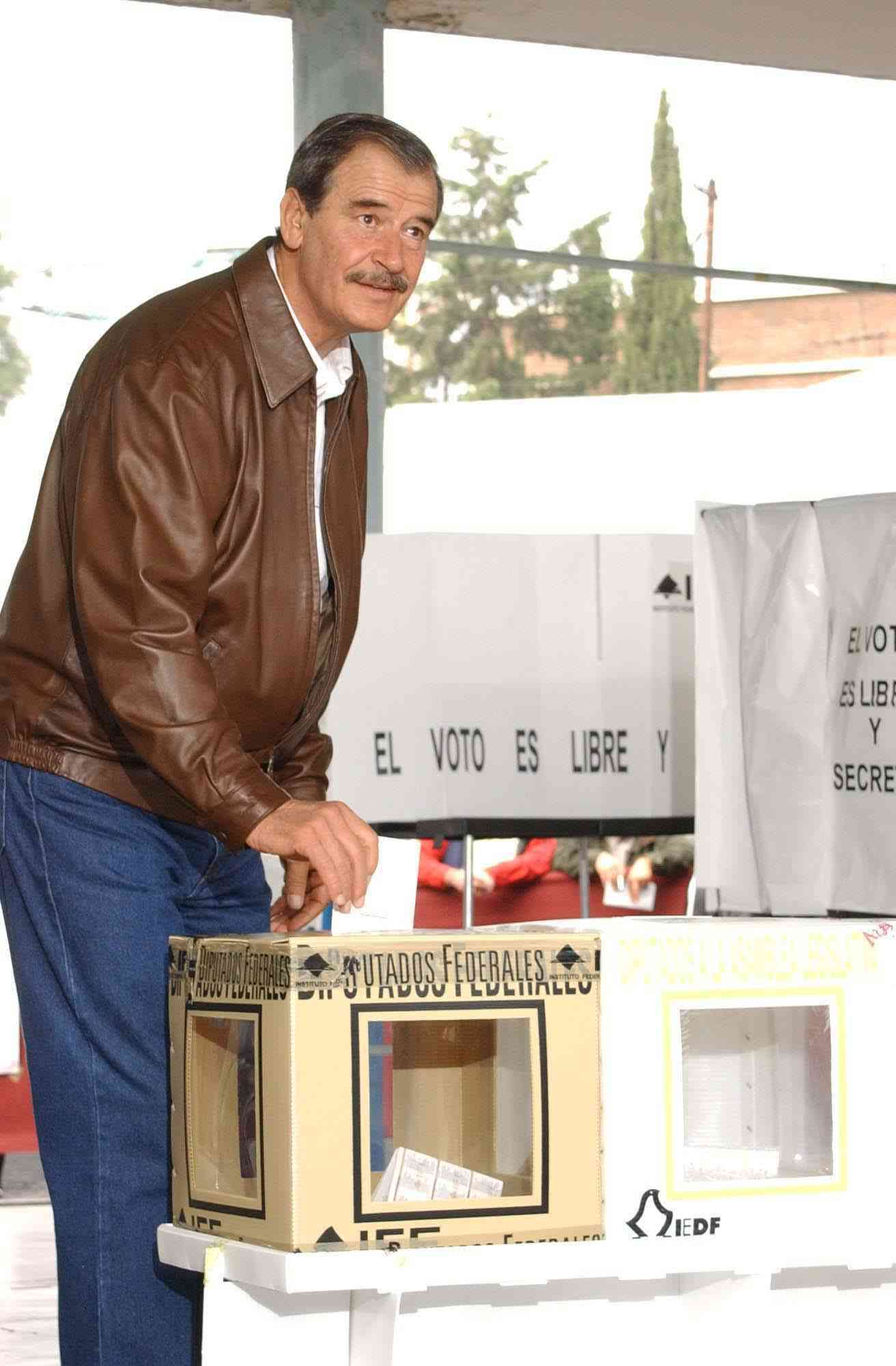
President Vicente Fox voting for the 2003 elections

As a government, the National Action Party (PAN) faced its first federal election. Given that the PAN was unable to win a majority in the Congress of the Union in the 2000 elections, primarily in the Chamber of Deputies, it claimed that several of its electoral pledges and campaign promises, including the so-called structural reforms (labor, energy, and fiscal), would not be fulfilled. In light of this situation, the goal for 2003 was established: to secure the majority of seats in the Chamber of Deputies in order to carry out campaign pledges.

The communication strategy had two main goals: first, it was to remind voters of the wrongdoings and corruption of the PRI rulers when they were in power; second, it was to take advantage of President Vicente Fox Quesada's popularity. Similarly, the communication plan sought to create a sentiment in favor of the integration of a unified government format, as PAN members believed that the divided government format had prevented society's desired change from occurring. The campaign slogan "Take the brakes off change" exemplifies this communication strategy in this manner.

As part of the new strategy, it was decided to guarantee more electoral profitability by nominating federal deputies who were thought to be more well-liked and socially accepted. President Fox oversaw an electronic media advertising campaign from the federal government, which was also decided to run concurrently with the election campaign (the same thing happened when it came to municipal and state governments). In order to achieve the same goal of gaining a majority in the Chamber of Deputies, two sizable advertising campaigns would be combined.

=== Institutional Revolutionary Party ===
Logo of the PRI

The PRI had a different approach. First and foremost, we elected candidates through primaries in the majority of districts in an effort to move past the authoritarian party claims of the past. In this sense, the candidates gained legitimacy through a democratic process that was accessible to the general public and included participation from the membership. In order to bring the party back to its foundation, it was also necessary to save the party's popular tradition, which focused its discourse on and supported the defense of social rights. In this sense, the phrase "The PRI is on your side" was created, signifying that the party belonged to the working class and was focused on finding solutions to significant societal issues. Third, the PAN members' failure to keep their campaign pledges was the focal point of the PRI's political communication strategy. That is, take advantage of the frustration felt by a large number of voters who supported Fox in 2000 but were disappointed by the poor performance of his administration and the non-implementation of the promised reforms.

In this way, the PRI created a communication plan that was centered on the issues that the general public was most concerned with, promising to protect the interests of the vast majority and, most importantly, raising expectations of a correction of the government's long-standing political vices and practices. Similarly, this party determined that state steering committees would have the authority to modify campaign themes and proselytizing tactics in accordance with local conditions while adhering to national campaign directives.

Ultimately, the PRI amplified the mistakes and wrongdoings of a few PAN leaders, causing the PAN candidates to lose their social standing and, most importantly, distort the principles of integrity and democracy that they had long championed. Furthermore, the PRI's national leadership made the decision to support a policy of forging alliances with other parties, which it partially achieved with Fuerza Ciudadana and the PVEM.

=== Party of the Democratic Revolution ===
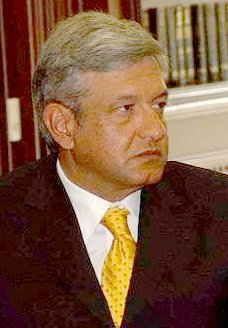
The popularity of López Obrador as Head of Government of the capital was the catapult of the rebirth of the PRD

Four main concepts were the focus of the PRD. To start, keep internal disputes out of the nomination process for the various positions that the public elects, as this will help the party appear cohesive and well-run to the public. In this sense, the procedures for choosing its candidates through public elections were dropped. Rather, the process of consultation was granted through surveys and the political councils' decision to propose candidates. Internal elections have evolved from being a standard procedure for selecting candidates to being merely one more choice among several options.

Secondly, the strategy employed by this party was centered around capitalizing on Andrés Manuel López Obrador's immense popularity as the Federal District's Head of Government in order to garner support. In this way, the party promoted the accomplishments of his administration and even aired ads from the 2000 election campaign urging people to support the party and its nominees.

Third, the PRD created an electronic media communication campaign to try and convince voters that neither the PAN nor the PRI was a good choice for government because, while in power, they had failed to address societal issues. The communication strategy reminded the public of the previous "marriage" between these parties and the 1994 agreement they had to approve FOBAPROA in the same sequence of concepts.

Lastly, the PRD used the most disadvantaged social classes' voters as its target audience for persuasion. To achieve this, it produced and disseminated a variety of media spots and messages, emphasizing the needs and problems of the underprivileged and elevating representatives to the status of message heroes. among these societal strata. To put it briefly, the PRD sought to position itself as a hopeful alternative for a large number of Mexicans in light of the shortcomings of the PRI and PAN administrations.

=== Ecologist Green Party of Mexico ===
Four primary actions were the focus of the PVEM strategies. First, an active national media campaign featuring imaginative commercials aimed at setting expectations regarding the benefits of supporting their party's candidates. Second, the PVEM made youth its primary target audience, and thus came up with the motto, "A young party for the new Mexico." Finally, it nominated candidates with a certain social prestige, many of them young, even though they were not active in the party's ranks or had recently defected from other parties. Third, it consented to a partial alliance with the PRI in almost 100 electoral districts.

Organizing computer raffles for the public, having its candidates and supporters clean up empty lots, rivers, and roadways, and using its environmentalist banner in commercials were some of its other tactics. The PVEM attempted to break free from tripartism in this way.

== Results ==
Party	Party-list			Constituency			Total seats	+/–
Party	Votes	%	Seats	Votes	%	Seats	Total seats	+/–
National Action Party	8,219,649	31.81	71	8,189,699	31.80	80	151	–56
Institutional Revolutionary Party	6,196,171	23.98	63	6,166,358	23.94	161	224	+16
Party of the Democratic Revolution	4,707,009	18.22	41	4,694,365	18.23	56	97	+44
Alliance for All Coalition	3,637,685	14.08	0	3,637,685	14.12	0	0	New
Ecologist Green Party of Mexico	1,068,721	4.14	14	1,063,741	4.13	3	17	0
Labor Party	642,290	2.49	6	640,724	2.49	0	6	–1
Convergence for Democracy	605,156	2.34	5	602,392	2.34	0	5	+1
México Posible	243,361	0.94	0	242,280	0.94	0	0	New
Social Alliance Party	198,075	0.77	0	197,488	0.77	0	0	–2
Citizen Force Party	124,022	0.48	0	123,499	0.48	0	0	New
Mexican Liberal Party	108,844	0.42	0	108,377	0.42	0	0	New
Party of the Nationalist Society	72,267	0.28	0	72,029	0.28	0	0	–3
Non-registered candidates	16,447	0.06	0	16,359	0.06	0	0	0
Total	25,839,697	100.00	200	25,754,996	100.00	300	500	0
Valid votes	25,839,697	96.64		25,754,996	96.64			
Invalid/blank votes	899,227	3.36		896,649	3.36			
Total votes	26,738,924	100.00		26,651,645	100.00			
Registered voters/turnout	64,710,596	41.32		64,710,596	41.19			
Source: Nohlen, Federal Election Institute, Country Profile: Mexico
