= Social Democracy (Mexico) =

Defunct political party in Mexico

Social Democracy Democracia Social
- Leader: Gilberto Rincón Gallardo
- Founded: 1996
- Dissolved: 2000
- Merged into: Social Democratic Party (Mexico)
- Headquarters: Mexico City
- Ideology: Social democracy
- Political position: Centre-left

Social Democracy (Spanish: Democracia Social) was a Mexican political party formed in June 1999 and disbanded after the 2000 federal elections.

In the 2 July 2000 presidential elections its candidate, Gilberto Rincón Gallardo, won 1.6% of the popular vote. In the senatorial elections of the same date the party won 1.8% but no seats in the Senate of Mexico. Since it did not secure 2.0% percent of the national vote it lost its conditional recognition by the Federal Electoral Institute (IFE).

In 2003 its most visible leaders could not reorganize its former members under the Party of the Rose (Partido de la Rosa). After failing to regain the federal recognition, most of them migrated to different parties of the center-left such as México Posible, Fuerza Ciudadana, Convergencia and the Social Democratic Party.

Its members included Patricia Mercado.

== See also ==
- List of political parties in Mexico
- Politics of Mexico
