= Patricia Mercado =

Mexican politician

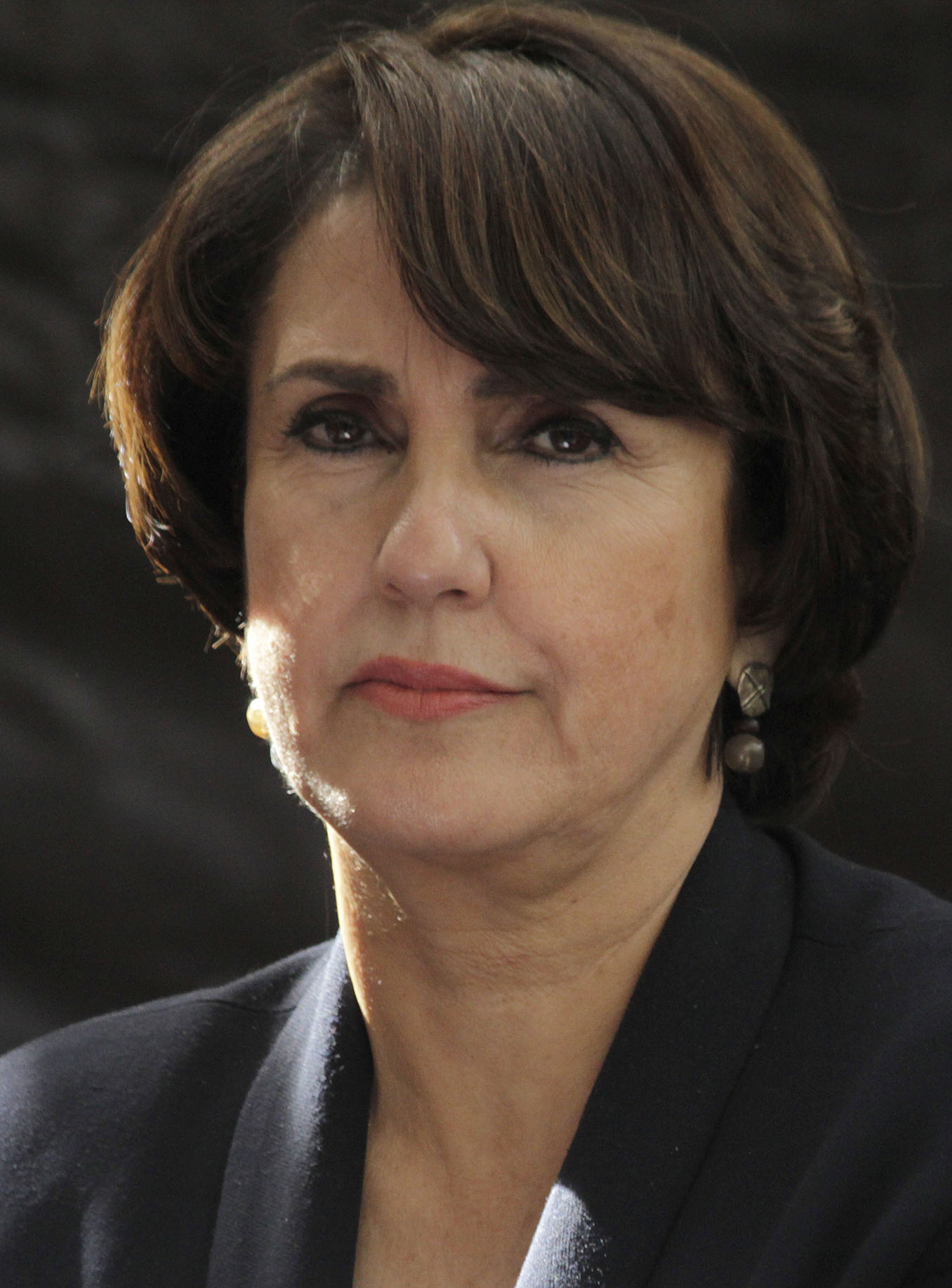
Portrait of Patricia Mercado

Dora Patricia Mercado Castro (Spanish pronunciation: [paˈtɾisja meɾˈkaðo]; born October 21, 1957, in Ciudad Obregón, Sonora) is a Mexican feminist politician. She is a founder, former president and the 2006 presidential candidate of the former Social Democratic Party.

Mercado Castro received a bachelor's degree in economics from the National Autonomous University of Mexico (UNAM). In 1992 she received a scholarship from the MacArthur Foundation and three years later, she represented Mexico in the World Conference on Women in Beijing, China.

Although in 1991 she was a candidate of the Labor Party to the Chamber of Deputies, she is better known for competing in the primary election for the Social Democracy (in Spanish: Democracia Social) nomination in the 2000 presidential elections against party leader Gilberto Rincón Gallardo and heading México Posible, a defunct political party that failed to secure its registry in the 2003 federal election. While in campaign, she actively promoted abortion rights, gay marriage, the legalization of marijuana and unsuccessfully took several Catholic bishops to court for distributing political pamphlets against her party.

She was the presidential candidate for Social Democratic Party (Mexico) during the 2006 elections, obtaining 2.7% of the popular vote, which was enough to secure the party's national registration. Her campaign was considered particularly successful, considering she ran without any private or public funding. The first presidential debate during the campaign is considered her best performance.

Since 2009, she has been part of Citizens' Movement.

On 2014, she was appointed Secretary of Labor of Mexico City, and in 2015, as Secretary of Government in Miguel Ángel Mancera's administration. Between 2018 and 2024, Mercado was senator by National List. Since 2024, she is federal representative by proportional representation.

Mercado is mother of Mexican actress Ximena Romo.
