= Alliance for Mexico =

Alliance for Mexico Alianza por México
- Leader: Cuauhtémoc Cárdenas
- President: José Antonio Calderón Cardoso; Dante Delgado Rannauro; Amalia García Alberto Anaya Gutiérrez; Gustavo Riojas Santana
- Founded: 1999
- Dissolved: 2001
- Merger of: • Party of the Democratic Revolution • Social Alliance Party • Convergence • Labor Party • Party of the Nationalist Society
- Ideology: Social democracy Left-wing nationalism
- Political position: Centre-left to left-wing

The Alliance for Mexico (Spanish: Alianza por México) is the name of two multi-party electoral alliances in Mexico, one from 2000 and the other from 2006.

In the 2000 general election, Alliance for Mexico was a grouping of the Party of the Democratic Revolution, the Labor Party, the Party of the Nationalist Society, Convergence for the Democracy (founded by ex-PRI dissidents) and the Social Alliance Party (founded by precursors of the Mexican Democratic Party). Cuauhtémoc Cárdenas ran as its candidate for president of Mexico and won 19 percent of the vote. The Alliance also won 68 seats in the Chamber of Deputies and 17 seats in the Senate.
