= Alberto Begné Guerra =

Mexican politician

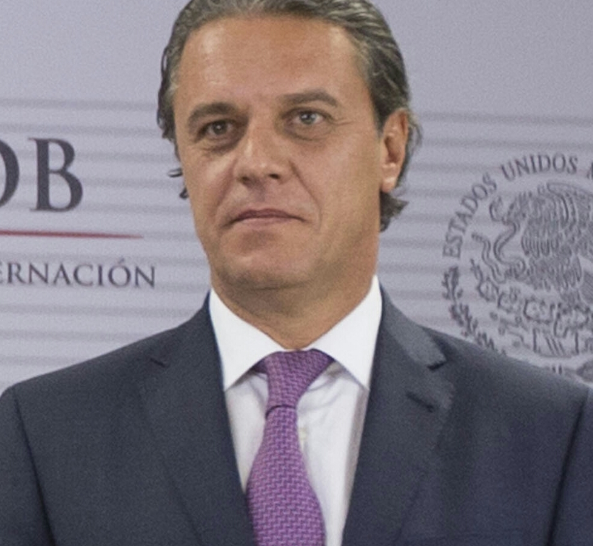

Deputy Secretary for Crime Prevention and Citizen Participation
- In office 26 February 2016 – 30 November 2018
- President: Enrique Peña Nieto
- Preceded by: Arturo Escobar y Vega

Social Democratic Alternative Party
- In office 2005–2008
- Preceded by: Patricia Mercado
- Succeeded by: Jorge Carlos Díaz Cuervo

Personal details
- Born: July 30, 1963 (age 63) Mexico City, Mexico
- Education: Instituto Ortega y Gasset
- Profession: Lawyer and politician

Alberto Begné Guerra (Mexico City, Mexico, July 30, 1963) is a Mexican politician. He was served as Deputy Secretary for Crime Prevention and Citizen Participation in the Interior Ministry.

== Academic career ==
He holds a bachelor's degree in law from the National Autonomous University of Mexico (UNAM) and has a master's degree in international relations from the Ortega y Gasset Institute. His academic resume includes being professor of law at UNAM, ITAM (where he was also Coordinator of the Diploma of Law and Electoral Institutions in 1998 and 1999) and CIDE (where he was a member of the Board from 1999 to 2004). He is an active columnist for the newspaper Excelsior, where his column appears every Tuesday in the Opinion section. Among his publications are: Access to Justice and Defense of the Constitution and Political Parties and Elections Systems, Comparative Study where he shares authorship with Jose Woldenberg.

== Political career ==
He began his professional activities as advisor of the Secretary of Education from 1986 to 1988, from 1990 to 1991, he served as Advisor to the Cabinet for Foreign Policy of the Presidency of the Republic and from 1996 to 1998 he served as Director of Citizenship and Electoral Education at the Federal Electoral Institute (IFE). In 2000 he was the campaign spokesman of Jesus Silva-Herzog Flores as candidate for the Head of the Federal District by the PRI party and 2002-2004 he served as Executive Secretary (Founder) of the Federal Institute of Access to Public Information (IFAI). In 2005, he was a co-founder the Social Democratic Party, where he served as President of the National Executive Committee of August 2005 to September 2008. On 25 February 2016, he was appointed Deputy Secretary of Crime Prevention and Citizen Participation in the Interior Ministry.

== See also ==
- Politics of Mexico
- List of political parties in Mexico
