= Social Democratic Party (Mexico) =

Social Democratic Party Partido Social Demócrata
- Abbreviation: PSD
- Leader: Alberto Begné Guerra
- Founder: Patricia Mercado; Ignacio Irys Salomon
- Founded: 2005
- Dissolved: 2009
- Merger of: Citizen Force Party; Social Democracy (Mexico); México Posible; Partido Campesino y Popular
- Merged into: Citizens' Movement
- Headquarters: Mexico City
- Ideology: Secularism; Social democracy New Left; Feminism
- Political position: Center-left to left-wing
- Colours: Red and White

Website
- pasode.org.mx

The Social Democratic Party or Social Democratic and Peasant Alternative Party (Spanish: Partido Socialdemócrata, PSD, Partido Alternativa Socialdemócrata y Campesina, Alternativa) was a left-wing Mexican political party between 2005 and 2009. It defined itself as a New Left party and distanced itself from what they claimed was the "conflictive left" in Mexico. Founded by Patricia Mercado and Ignacio Irys Salomon, the party nominated Patrica Mercado for the 2006 general election.

In the 2006 legislative elections the party won 4 out of 500 seats in the Chamber of Deputies

== History ==
=== Founding in 2004–2005 ===
Originally named as Social Democratic and Peasant Alternative Party, the party started as an alliance between two political leaders, Ignacio Irys Salomon and Patricia Mercado along with peasantry factions. Although, most of its members also come from four other social democratic parties who have lost registration and merged from the following Social Democracy Party led by Gilberto Rincón Gallardo, México Posible (originally led by Patricia Mercado), Citizen Force Party and the Partido Campesino y Popular.

=== 2006 elections ===
Logo used in the 2006 Federal Elections

During 2006, The peasant wing of the PSD was headed by Ignacio Irys Salomón, as part of the fractured Coalition of Urban and Peasant Democratic Organizations which brings together ejidatarios, small landowners and commoners.

The party was seriously fractured, since it was a new party right before the 2006 elections. The peasant wing decided to promote the candidacy of pharmaceutical businessman Víctor González Torres, who was highly popular among them and challenged Mercado's candidacy, assuming that the latter did not have sufficient support within the party. González Torres proclaimed himself as candidate and began a media campaign against Mercado. The Electoral Institute ratified Mercado's candidacy for presidential candidate of the party.

After ratification was confirmed for Mercado, Víctor González campaigned without a political party or registration as a candidate.

In the 2006 elections the PSD managed to obtain 2.11% of the total votes, while in the 2006 legislative elections the party won 4 out of 500 seats in the Chamber of Deputies but no senators elected.

=== Dissolution ===
The Social Democratic Party came to an end after the results in the 2009 legislative elections; the party won only 1.03% of the vote and did not reach the 2.0% required to be known as a political party, thus losing registration and dissolving. Some of its principal members joined the Citizens' Movement Party.

== Ideology ==
The PSD opposed the public influence of the Roman Catholic Church and has challenged the moral and teaching authority of Archbishop of Mexico Cardinal Norberto Rivera. It also pleaded in favor of equal marriage, euthanasia, the decriminalization of abortion and the legalization of some drugs.

== PSD presidents ==
- Patricia Mercado (2005)
- Alberto Begné Guerra (2005–2008)
- Jorge Carlos Díaz Cuervo (2008–2009)

== PSD presidential candidates ==
- Patricia Mercado (2006)

== See also ==
- Politics of Mexico
- List of political parties in Mexico
