= Alfonso Mejía Arias =

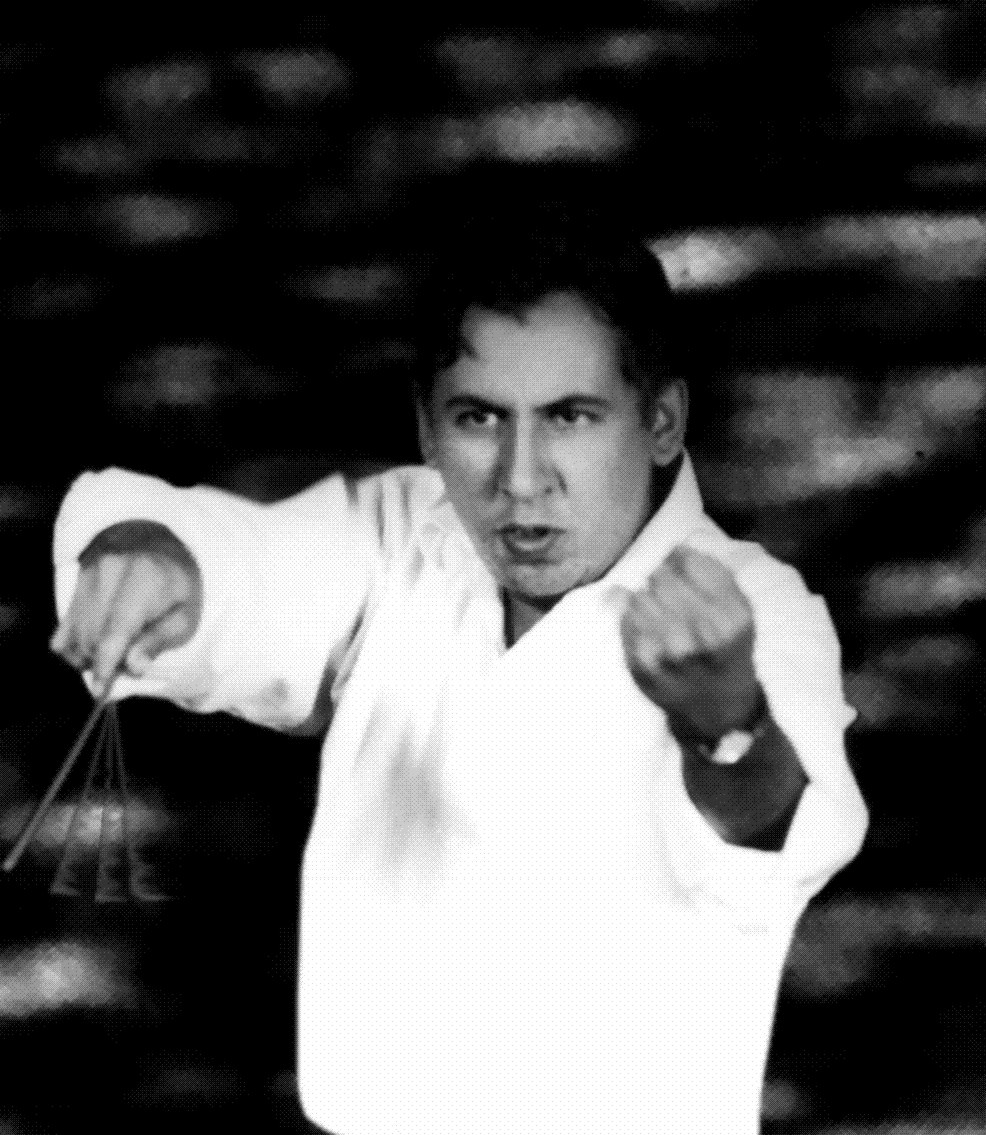
Alfonso Mejía Arias in 2000.

Alfonso Mejía Arias is a Mexican musician, writer, social activist and politician. He was born in Veracruz, Mexico on 11 September 1961 and has lived mostly in Mexico City, where his family settled.

== Career ==
From his childhood joined musical associations that defined his vocation. He studied violoncello, art history, ethnomusicology and choral and orchestral conduction at the National Conservatory of Music, and the National School of Music of UNAM. Disciple of prestigious teachers as Barbara Kaminska (Poland), Enrique Marmisolle, Jorge Cordova, Leonardo Velazquez, and Christian Caballero among many others. Also attended Master Classes from Yo-Yo Ma and Mstislav Rostropovich.

Dr Mejia-Arias is a specialist in Japanese traditional music and has been renowned in Japan as First Hispanic American Shakuhachi Player (Distinction granted by Dai Sensei Aoki Reibo, national living treasure). Mejia-Arias also had the personal guidance of Kifu Mitsuhashi, Hodo Yamaguchi, and Katsuya Yokoyama in Mexico, Los Angeles, California, United States, and Okayama, Japan. In Mexico he learned composition and orchestral conduction from Humberto Hernández Medrano. Mejia-Arias is member of the Orchestral Conducting Workshop of Itzvan Lenker in New York City, United States, and San Salvador, Republic of El Salvador.

Mejia-Arias also studied in Toyohashi, Nagoya, and Bisen, Okayama in Japan, New York City, Los Angeles, California, United States. Baroque Music Interpretation from Rainer Johansen and Isabel Shau of Musika Antiqua Köln, (Germany). Interpretation and Ornamentation of Medieval, Renaissance and Baroque Music from Philip Pickett, of The Musicians Of the Globe, London, UK.

== Political career ==
Alfonso Mejía Arias has participated in Mexican politics, and ran for a position representing the Mexican Liberal Party (PLM). He openly criticized government policies, and wrote in many publications such as La Noche de Las Luciérnagas and Podium, denouncing corruption and human rights violations in his country, as well those inflicted to Mexican ethnical minorities as those to his own Romani people settled in Mexico. These actions brought him prosecution from different parties, specially from the Party of the Democratic Revolution (PRD), governing Mexico City and other important cities.

== Works ==
Diferencias conceptuales entre los Barrocos Europeo y Mexicano (Conceptual differences within European and Mexican Baroque) essay. As well as musicals and other multidisciplinary performances.
