= Federico Ling Altamirano =

Mexican engineer, diplomat and politician (1939–2014)

Mexico Ambassador to the Holy See
- In office 19 May 2009 – 10 June 2013
- President: Felipe Calderón Hinojosa
- Preceded by: Luis Felipe Bravo Mena
- Succeeded by: Mariano Palacios Alcocer

Personal details
- Born: Héctor Federico Ling Altamirano; 8 February 1939 Mexico City, Mexico
- Died: 23 April 2014 (aged 75)
- Party: PAN
- Spouse: Mercedes Sanz Cerrada
- Education: National Autonomous University of Mexico
- Occupation: Engineer, politician, diplomat

Héctor Federico Ling Altamirano (8 February 1939 – 23 April 2014) was a Mexican engineer, diplomat and politician affiliated with the National Action Party. He served as Senator of the LVIII and LIX Legislatures of the Mexican Congress representing the Federal District, as Deputy during the LI and LIII Legislatures and as Ambassador of Mexico to the Holy See between 2009 and 2013. He also served in the LVIII Legislature of the Congress of Durango.

Preceded by Luis Felipe Bravo Mena	Ambassador of Mexico to the Holy See; 2009 — 2013	Succeeded by Mariano Palacios Alcocer
