= Social Alliance Party =

Social Alliance Party Partido Alianza Social
- Abbreviation: PAS
- President: José Antonio Calderón Cardoso
- General Secretary: Adalberto Rosas Lopez
- Founded: 1998
- Dissolved: 2003
- Preceded by: Mexican Democratic Party
- Headquarters: Mexico City
- Newspaper: Voz del PAS
- Ideology: Humanism; Christian democracy Social conservatism National conservatism
- Political position: Right-wing
- Slogan: For Peace, Truth and Change

The Social Alliance Party (Spanish: Partido Alianza Social; abbr. PAS), was a radical-right humanist political party in Mexico that was founded in 1998 by José Antonio Calderón Cardoso and Guillermo Calderón Domínguez. It was dissolved in 2003.

== History ==
=== Initial stages and foundation of PAS 1997-1998 ===
Following the Mexican Democratic Party's defeat in the 1997 legislative elections (less than one percent of the vote and no seats), the party held its National Congress in Mexico City, where a resolution was reached to dissolve the aforementioned "political institute".

Notably, prominent politicians who were initially associated with the PDM, José Antonio Calderón and Guillermo Calderón Domínguez, were essential in the formation of PAS. Despite most of its members originating from the far-right Mexican Democratic Party; other right-wing rearmaments and former political party members, notably such as the National Synarchist Union and the National Action Party were integrated into PAS. It was recognized and obtained federal party registration on June 30, 1999.

=== 2000 General Election ===
Alliance for Mexico

During the 2000 general election, the party formed a coalition with the Democratic Revolution Party known as the Alliance for Mexico (Alianza por México): a left-wing coalition consisting of political parties opposed to the Institutional Revolutionary Party and nominating Cuauhtémoc Cárdenas as its presidential candidate.

In total, 19% of the votes were cast for the coalition, which allowed the Social Alliance Party two seats in the Chamber of Deputies and registration in the LVIII Legislature.

=== Decline and dissolution ===
==== INE fines ====
Before its involvement in the 2003 legislative elections, PAS was fined 3,285,000 pesos by the Federal Electoral Institute, for allegedly mismanaging financial resources and using treasury funds for "non-party activities". Beatriz Patricia Lorenzo Juarez, the party's organizational secretary, made reference to the fines levied by the IFE, criticizing the effort to "treat all parties equally".

Guillermo Calderón claimed that an "annual plan" was in development to help structure the party and achieving a presence throughout the country to compete in the legislative elections. He asserted that the projection of PAS for 2003 must be applied in order not to lose its registration with the IFE and allow them to participate in the next electoral local elections.

==== Dissolution ====
PAS never managed to achieve the votes needed to keep registration during the 2003 legislative elections (2.00%), only managing to receive around 0.7% votes to be considered a political party, thus dissolving PAS on 29 August 2003.

== Ideology ==
The PAS defined itself centrist and forbade to fit into the traditional spectrum of right or left; however, it was considered right-wing as its precursor and just about most its members appeared from the dissolved Mexican Democratic Party.

== PAS presidents ==
- (1998 - 2003): José Antonio Calderón Cardoso

== PAS presidential candidates ==
- (2000): Cuauhtémoc Cárdenas Solórzano (alliance with PRD, PT, C and PSN to form Alliance for Mexico coalition)
