= Red sun =

Red sun or Red Sun may refer to:

== Astronomy ==
- Red giant, a large star with high luminosity and a low surface temperature
- Red dwarf, a small star with low luminosity and a low surface temperature
- Any star with a suitable spectral type

== Titled works ==
- Red Sun, a 1971 Spaghetti Western film featuring a samurai and Western outlaw team-up
- Red Sun (1970 film), a West German crime film
- "Red Sun", a track from Anoushka Shankar's 2005 album Rise
- "Red Sun" (紅日), a 1992 Cantopop song by Hacken Lee later released on collections with the same title
- "Red Sun", the main boss theme of antagonist Sundowner from the soundtrack of Metal Gear Rising: Revengeance

== Other uses ==
- A nickname of the founder of People's Republic of China, Mao Zedong
- Red Sun, one of two versions of the video game Mega Man Battle Network 4
- Communist Party of Ecuador – Red Sun, a Marxist–Leninist–Maoist guerrilla organization in Ecuador
- Red Sun - People's Movement, a Marxist-Leninist-Maoist political organization in Mexico
- Red sunflower, a sunflower variety

== See also ==
- Superman: Red Son, a comic book limited series
- Superman: Red Son (film), an animated film based on the comics
