= Alliance for Change =

Alliance for Change may refer to:

- Alliance for Change (Ecuador), a political alliance formed for the 2017 Ecuadorian general election
- Alliance for Change (Guyana)
- Alliance for Change (Macau)
- Alleanza Bidla (meaning "Alliance for Chance" in Maltese)
- Alliance du Changement, a coalition formed for the 2024 Mauritian general election
- Alliance for Change (Mexico)
- Alliance for Change (Panama)
- Alliance for Change (Venezuela)
- Alliance for Democratic Changes, a government coalition in Bosnia and Herzegovina
- Kukuriku coalition, a Croatian organization formerly known as Alliance for Change
