= Pedro Cerisola =

Mexican politician and architect

Pedro Cerisola y Weber
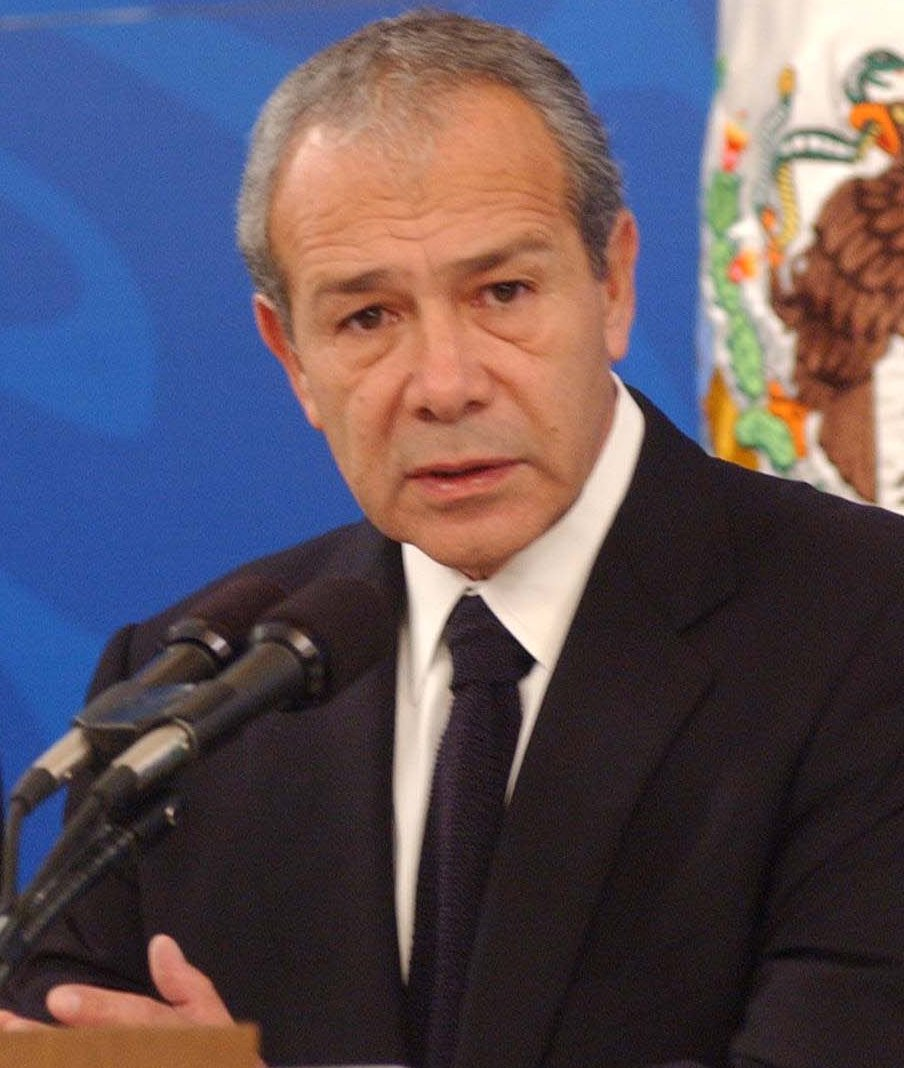

Secretary of Communications and Transportation
- In office 2000–2006
- President: Vicente Fox

Personal details
- Born: March 3, 1949 (age 77) Mexico City, Mexico
- Education: National Autonomous University of Mexico; Universidad Iberoamericana
- Occupation: Architect

Pedro Cerisola y Weber (born March 3, 1949, in Mexico City) is a Mexican architect who served as Secretary of Communications under President Vicente Fox's administration.

Cerisola studied architecture at the National Autonomous University of Mexico (UNAM) and at the Universidad Iberoamericana. In the 1980s he worked in the Secretariat of Communications in the aeronautics area. In the private sector he worked for Teléfonos de Mexico serving in different position.

Cerisola headed Vicente Fox's campaign for the presidency. In 2000 President Fox designated him Secretary of Communications.

He is a member of the IATA executive committee.
