= Alliance for Change (Mexico) =

Mexican political party

Alliance for Change Alianza por el Cambio
- Logo of the Alliance for Change (Mexico)
- Abbreviation: AxC
- Leader: Vicente Fox
- Founded: 1999
- Dissolved: 2001
- Ideology: Christian democracy Liberal conservatism Social conservatism Right-wing populism
- Political position: Right-wing

The Alliance for Change (Spanish: Alianza por el Cambio, AxC) was a political alliance formed in Mexico for the purpose of contesting the general election of 2 July 2000 against the-then ruling Institutional Revolutionary Party.

== History ==
There were two member parties of the alliance: the National Action Party (Partido Acción Nacional, or PAN), and the Green Ecological Party of Mexico (Partido Verde Ecologista de México, or PVEM).

With 43.43% of the popular vote in a three-horse race, the Alliance for Change's candidate for the position of President of Mexico, Vicente Fox, was declared the winner of the election, putting an end to 70 years of hegemonic rule by the Institutional Revolutionary Party (PRI). Between them, the two parties also won 221 seats in the Chamber of Deputies (of 500) and 51 in the Senate (of 128).

=== Dissolution ===
One year after Fox took office, however, the PVEM publicly broke with the PAN as regards its support for him. Since then, the PVEM has more frequently allied itself with the PRI to fight gubernatorial and local elections.

== Electoral history ==
=== Presidential elections ===
Election year	Candidate	# votes	% vote	Result
2000	Vicente Fox	15,989,636	42.5	✓ Elected

=== Congressional elections ===
==== Chamber of Deputies ====
Election year	Constituency		PR		# of seats	Position	Presidency
Election year	votes	%	votes	%	# of seats	Position	Presidency
2000	14,212,032	38.2	14,321,975	38.3	223 / 500	Minority	Vicente Fox

=== Senate elections ===
Election year	Constituency		PR		# of seats	Position	Presidency	Note
Election year	votes	%	votes	%	# of seats	Position	Presidency	Note
2000	14,208,973	38.1	14,339,963	38.2	60 / 128	Minority	Vicente Fox	Coalition: Alliance for Change
