= Gilberto Rincón Gallardo =

Mexican activist and politician

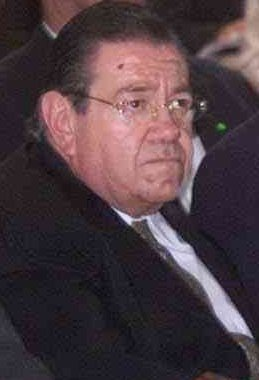
- Rincón in 2004

Personal details
- Born: 15 May 1939 Mexico City, Mexico
- Died: 30 August 2008 (aged 69) Mexico City, Mexico
- Party: National Action Party; Mexican Communist Party; Unified Socialist Party of Mexico; Mexican Socialist Party; Party of the Democratic Revolution; Social Democracy
- Spouse: Silvia Pavón Hampshire
- Education: National Autonomous University of Mexico
- Occupation: Activist and politician

Gilberto Rincón Gallardo y Meltis (15 May 1939 – 30 August 2008) was a Mexican politician, activist and former presidential candidate.

== Biography ==
Rincón Gallardo was born in Mexico City into an upper-class family descendant of the Marquess of Guadalupe and Count of Regla, and composed of Gilberto Rincón Gallardo Gallardo and Blanca Meltis González. At age 19 he became involved in politics when he joined the 1958 presidential campaign of Luis H. Álvarez, a prominent figure of the conservative National Action Party. After graduating with a bachelor's degree in law from the National Autonomous University of Mexico and following his participation in several railroad workers' protests, he shifted politically to the left, where he participated in several political parties (some of which he represented at the Chamber of Deputies).

With Cuauhtémoc Cárdenas, Heberto Castillo and others he co-founded the Party of the Democratic Revolution (PRD), which he left in the nineties arguing that its internal political struggles and dogmatism had frustrated any chance of becoming a modern socialist party. Subsequently, he went on to build the Social Democracy Party (in Spanish: Partido Democracia Social) an institution that tried to introduce the Social Democracy ideology in Mexico, but failed to keep its official recognition by some 20,000 votes in the 2000 federal elections in which he ran as the party's presidential candidate.

In spite of the results, three years later he relaunched his platform as the Party of the Rose (Partido de la Rosa), which couldn't achieve official recognition because the Federal Electoral Institute (IFE) refused to recognize its statutes. Rincón Gallardo built an impressive legal team led by former general prosecutor Jorge Carpizo McGregor to challenge its decision but eventually failed to change the verdict.

As an activist, his harsh criticism to the Mexican government in the 1970s prompted several acts of repression and a political incarceration in the midst of the Mexican dirty war. Since he was born with a physical disability (shortened arms as the result of a birth defect), he also advocated better public policies toward the disabled and other social minorities.

Then-President Vicente Fox appointed him president of the National Council to Prevent Discrimination (Consejo Nacional para Prevenir la Discriminación, CONAPRED) on 11 July 2003. He was confirmed by President Felipe Calderón in 2006 and held the position until his death.

Following ten days of hospitalization, Rincón Gallardo died in Mexico City on 30 August 2008 at age 69. He was survived by his wife, Silvia Pavón Hampshire.

== Selected works ==
- Entre el pasado definitivo y el futuro posible: ejercicios de reflexión política en clave democrática (Fondo de Cultura Económica, 2008)
