= Luis Felipe Bravo Mena =

Mexican politician

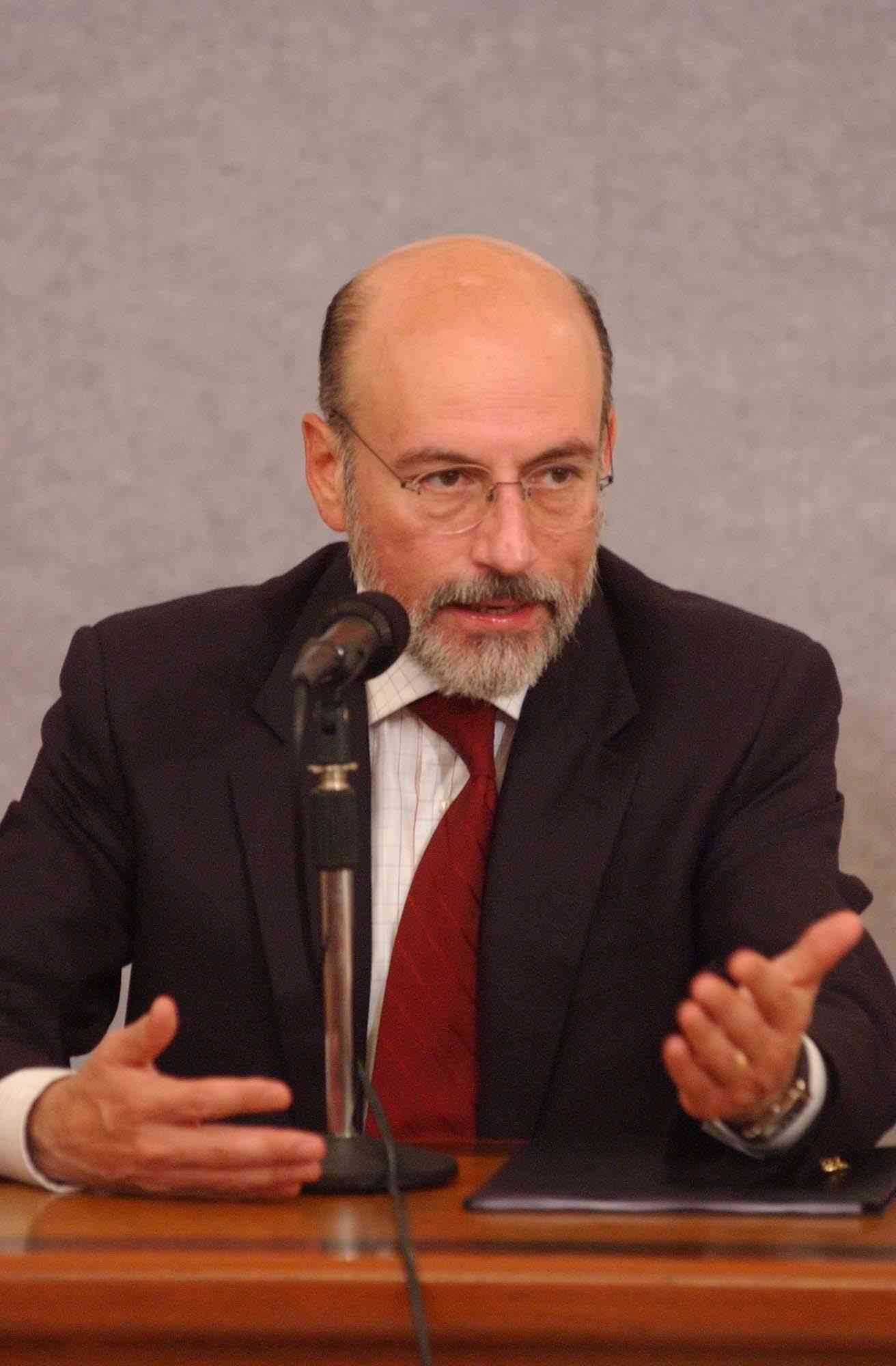
Luis Felipe Bravo

Luis Felipe Bravo Mena (born September 28, 1952 in León, Guanajuato) is a Mexican politician. He was elected as the 17th president of the National Action Party (PAN) and current Mexican ambassador to the Vatican City.

Bravo is the son of Luis Felipe Bravo García, a sales agent, and Luz María Mena Montoya. He graduated with a bachelor's degree in law from the University of Guanajuato and specialized in social and political philosophy at the Pan-American University.

He joined the conservative National Action Party in 1969 and served in the Chamber of Deputies (1991 – 1994) and in the Senate (1994 – 2000). From 1999 to 2005 he chaired the PAN and served as vice president of Centrist Democrat International, an association of political parties and groups adhering to the Christian Democracy ideology.

Bravo is married to María Teresita del Niño Jesús Tinoco Aldana and has four children: Luis Felipe, María Teresa, Mariano and Florentina.

On March 26, 2011 Bravo Mena became a contender for the PAN nomination to the government of the State of Mexico.
