= José Antonio Calderón Cardoso =

Mexican politician

- Born: 14 September 1968 (age 57); Mexico City, Mexico
- Education: UNAM
- Occupation: Politician
- Political party: Social Alliance Party

José Antonio Calderón Cardoso (born 14 September 1968) is a Mexican politician formerly from the Social Alliance Party. From 2000 to 2003 he served as Deputy of the LVIII Legislature of the Mexican Congress representing the Federal District. He also served as president of his party from 1999 to 2003.
