= Red Sun - People's Movement =

Mexican political party

Red Sun - People's Movement Corriente del Pueblo - Sol Rojo
- Spokesperson: Yolanda Ruiz
- Founded: 20 September 2016
- Split from: Communist Party of Mexico (Marxist-Leninist)
- Newspaper: Sol Rojista
- Ideology: Marxism-Leninism-Maoism; Communism; New Democracy; Anti-Imperialism; Gonzalo Thought
- Slogan: "The People Will Win With The Red Sun"

Website
- http://solrojista.blogspot.com/

Red Sun - People's Movement (Spanish: Corriente del Pueblo - Sol Rojo) is a Marxist-Leninist-Maoist political group in Mexico, mainly active in the state of Oaxaca. Red Sun was formed in 2016 as a split from the Hoxhaist-leaning Communist Party of Mexico (Marxist-Leninist); during which a number of its activists were imprisoned for accused vandalism and theft of electoral ballots.

The organization's ideology is heavily influenced by the ideals of Mao Zedong and Abimael Guzman, with the belief of building a New Democracy to "complete" the Mexican Revolution. Red Sun's primary activities revolve around rural and indigenous movements, but has some involvement with student, union, and women activism.

== Activity ==
The party held a conference on the 19th of January 2025.

=== Resisting national mega-projects ===
The Interoceanic Corridor of the Isthmus of Tehuantepec (CIIT) and the Maya Train (Tren Maya) are two government-sanctioned development projects that Red Sun continually opposes. The organization claims the construction is funded for an imperialist plunder of the land. They also assert that the mega-projects threaten the indigenous and poor peasant populations with impoverishment and violence.

=== Protests against intimidation ===
Red Sun is one out of many land rights organizations in Mexico that have faced repressive targeting through the use of violence. Several incidents are recorded involving Red Sun members, though no exact suspects have been properly identified by investigators. Incidents include:

- Ernesto Sernas Garcia - Suspicious Disappearance (May 10, 2018)
- Luis Armando Fuentes - Shot to Death (April 11, 2019)
- Jesús Manuel García - Shot to Death (October 27, 2022)

Red Sun regularly brings the incidents to attention for calls of action. Although evident connections are somewhat scarce, the organization typically accuses estate owners of perpetrating the crimes to inhibit the land defense movement.

== See also ==
- Shining Path
- Communist Party of Ecuador - Red Sun
- Rebel Zapatista Autonomous Municipalities
