= Communist Party of Mexico (Marxist–Leninist) =

Communist Party of Mexico (Marxist–Leninist) Partido Comunista de México (Marxista-Leninista)
- Founded: March 1978
- Headquarters: Mexico City
- Newspaper: Vanguardia Proletaria
- Ideology: Communism; Marxism–Leninism; Stalinism; Hoxhaism; Anti-revisionism
- Political position: Far-left
- International affiliation: CIPOML (Unity & Struggle)

Website
- www.pcmml.org

A cover of "Vanguardia Proletaria" about APPO. The party participated in APPO. In the header the reader can see the heads of Karl Marx, Friedrich Engels, Vladimir Lenin and Joseph Stalin.

Communist Party of Mexico (Marxist–Leninist) (Spanish: Partido Comunista de México (Marxista-Leninista)), is an anti-revisionist Marxist–Leninist communist party in Mexico which upholds the line of Joseph Stalin and Enver Hoxha.

The party is an active member of the International Conference of Marxist–Leninist Parties and Organizations (Unity & Struggle). It publishes the newspaper Vanguardia Proletaria and the theoretical magazine Política. This organization has been one of the most influential in the revolutionary left in Mexico, they have played an important part in the most significant social movements of recent years such as CGH (UNAM 1999), the Mexe Hidalgo (2000), Atenco (2003), Lazaro Cardenas (2006), Guerrero, the Commune of Oaxaca (APPO 2006).

== See also ==
- List of anti-revisionist groups
