= Mexican Liberal Party (2003) =

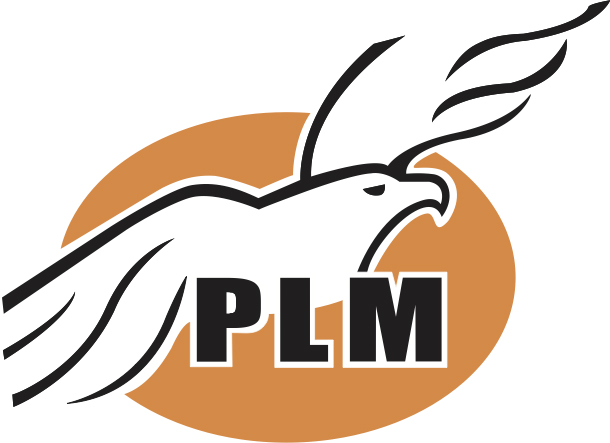
- Abbreviation: PLM
- President: Salvador Ordaz Montes de Oca
- Founded: 2002
- Dissolved: 2003
- Headquarters: Mexico City
- Ideology: Liberalism; Juarism
- Political position: Centre to centre-right

The Mexican Liberal Party (Spanish: Partido Liberal Mexicano;) was a Mexican political party that was founded by Salvador Ordaz Montes de Oca, and existed between 2002 and 2003.

The PLM claimed to be successor to the original Mexican Liberal party as well as to the liberal and Juarist principles for which they had fought in the War of Reform, which according to their postulates "that the modern political parties in Mexico had abandoned". In a prospective analysis, it was concluded that the dominant party, after some alternations, was approaching its inexorable extinction, so it was extremely important to create a party which intends to rescue the "Juarista principles".

== Dissolution ==
The PLM participated in the 2003 Legislative Elections where it did not obtain 2% of votes of the time, thus it lost its registration.
