= 2000 Mexican general election =

- 2 July 2000
- Presidential election
- Turnout: 63.97% (▼13.19pp)
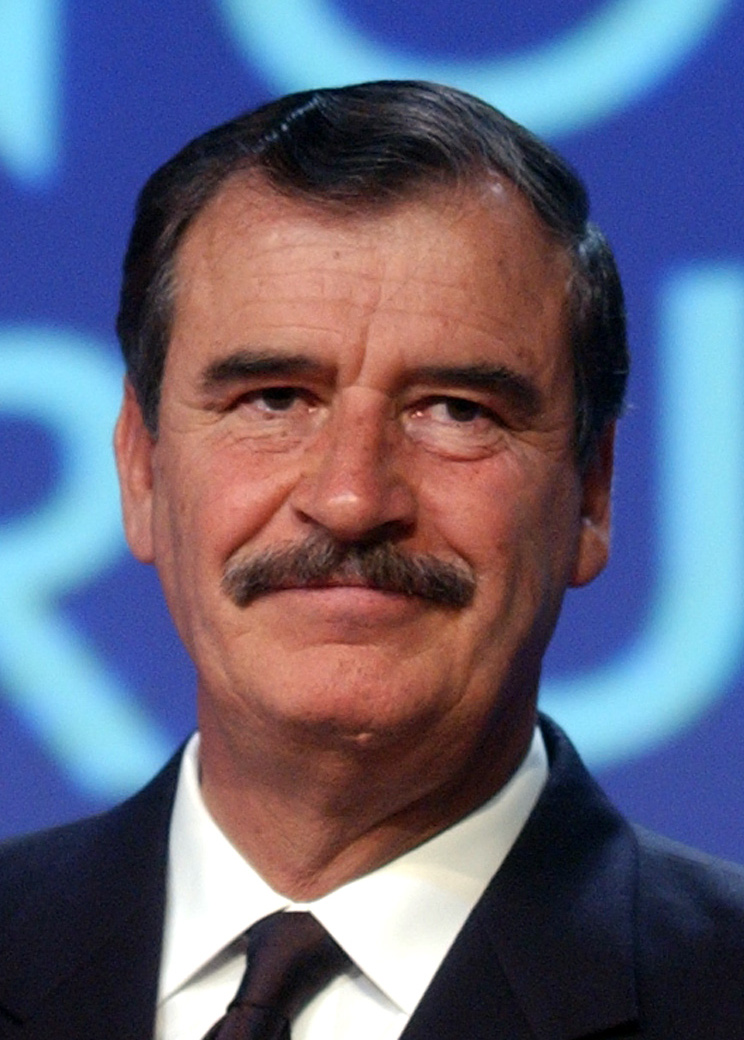

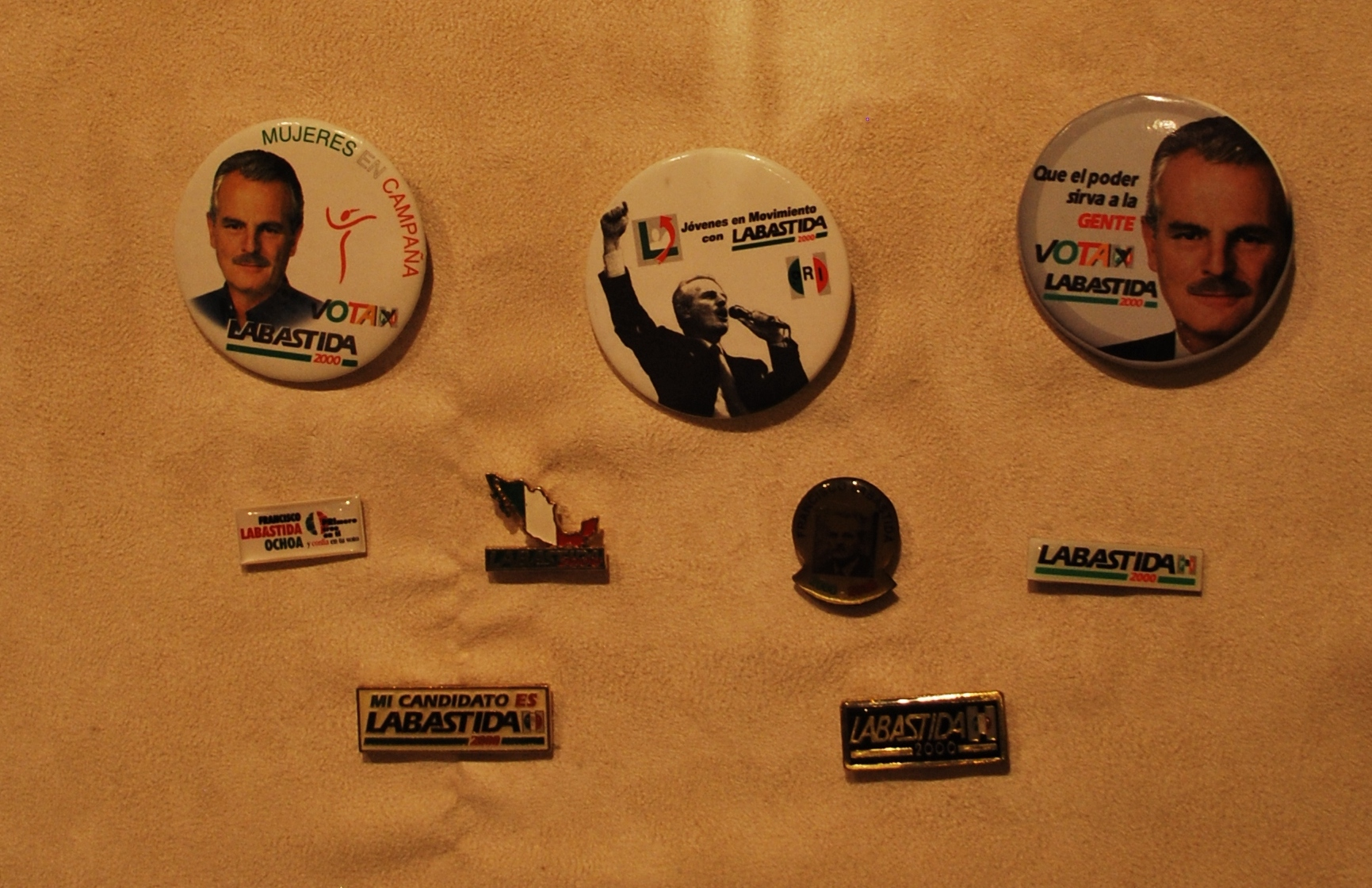

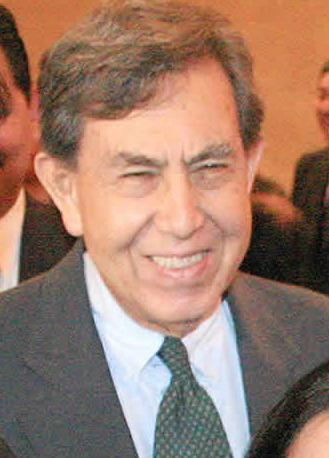
Nominee	Vicente Fox	Francisco Labastida	Cuauhtémoc Cárdenas
Party	PAN	PRI	PRD
Alliance	Alliance for Change		Alliance for Mexico
Popular vote	15,989,636	13,579,718	6,256,780
Percentage	43.43%	36.89%	17.00%
- Fox (31306) Labastida (24503) Cárdenas (5390) Rincón (1) Camacho (2) Muñoz (3) Tie (179) No data (10153)
President before election
Ernesto Zedillo
PRI
Elected President
Vicente Fox
PAN
- Senate
- All 128 seats in the Senate of the Republic; 65 seats needed for a majority
Party	Leader	Vote %	Seats	+/–
Alliance for Change	Luis Felipe Bravo Mena	39.10	51	+17
PRI	Dulce María Sauri Riancho	37.51	60	−16
Alliance for Mexico	–	19.29	17	+2
This lists parties that won seats. See the complete results below.
Results by state
- Chamber of Deputies
- All 500 seats in the Chamber of Deputies; 251 seats needed for a majority
Party	Leader	Vote %	Seats	+/–
Alliance for Change	Luis Felipe Bravo Mena	39.19	224	+95
PRI	Dulce María Sauri Riancho	37.75	211	−28
Alliance for Mexico	–	19.12	65	−67
This lists parties that won seats. See the complete results below.

General elections were held in Mexico on Sunday, 2 July 2000. Voters went to the polls to elect a new president to serve a single six-year term, replacing President Ernesto Zedillo Ponce de León, who was ineligible for re-election under the 1917 Constitution. The election system ran under plurality voting; 500 members of the Chamber of Deputies (300 by the first-past-the-post system and 200 by proportional representation) for three-year terms and 128 members of the Senate (three per state by first-past-the-post – two first-past-the-post seats are allocated to the party with the largest share of the vote; the remaining seat is given to the first runner-up – and 32 by proportional representation from national party lists) for six-year terms.

The presidential election was won by Vicente Fox of the Alliance for Change, who received 43.4% of the vote, the first time the opposition had won an election since the Mexican Revolution. In the congressional elections the Alliance for Change emerged as the largest faction in the Chamber of Deputies with 224 of the 500 seats, whilst the Institutional Revolutionary Party remained the largest faction in the Senate with 60 of the 128 seats. Voter turnout was between 63 and 64% in the elections.

This historically significant election made Fox the first president elected from an opposition party since Francisco I. Madero in 1911, as well as the first in 71 years to defeat, with 43 percent of the vote, the then-dominant Institutional Revolutionary Party.

== Primary elections ==
=== Institutional Revolutionary Party ===
President Ernesto Zedillo sought to break away from the 71-year-old PRI succession ritual, so the PRI conducted an unprecedented internal process to choose its presidential candidate for the 2000 elections. The president declared, "The so-called dedazo is dead"; dedazo being the term used to refer to the president personally choosing his successor, which roughly translates to "handpicking".

Francisco Labastida Ochoa, Humberto Roque Villanueva, Manuel Bartlett and Roberto Madrazo were the pre-candidates. Despite the president's statement, there was still a sense that Labastida was most likely to become the official candidate due to being the closest to President Zedillo.

Madrazo's confrontation with Labastida during the election was notable, as was Madrazo's "challenging" stance toward Zedillo, exemplified by his campaign slogan, Dale un Madrazo al dedazo ("Give a Madrazo to the dedazo", though it could also be translated as "Give a blow to the handpicking").

On 7 November 1999 the primary election was held, and widespread reports of fraudulent tactics were present. Nevertheless, Madrazo accepted the election's outcome and rejoined the Tabasco government following a meeting with Labastida in Los Pinos, where Zedillo intervened to stop Madrazo from breaking with the PRI. On 20 November Labastida was declared the PRI candidate.

Candidate	Votes	%
Francisco Labastida Ochoa	4,098,618	58.13
Roberto Madrazo Pintado	2,168,580	30.76
Manuel Bartlett Diaz	455,212	6.46
Humberto Roque Villanueva	328,357	4.66
Total	7,050,767	100.00
Source: El Pais

=== National Action Party ===
The former Guanajuato governor Vicente Fox Quesada was the only person to seek the National Action Party nomination and was ratified by the party. Pedro Cerisola was his general campaign coordinator.

=== Party of the Democratic Revolution ===
Porfirio Muñoz Ledo and Cuauhtémoc Cárdenas declared their interest in being candidates for the Party of the Democratic Revolution (PRD), a contest that ended with Muñoz Ledo's dismissal from the party. According to Muñoz Ledo it was inevitable that the same person would run for office a third time if there was no "true democratic process" in the PRD. Muñoz Ledo was later confirmed as the candidate for the Authentic Party of the Mexican Revolution and Cárdenas was designated as the PRD candidate.

== Campaign ==
On 27 April 2000 PAN candidate Vicente Fox sent a letter containing ten points to the apostolic nuncio Leonardo Sandri and the Conference of the Mexican Episcopate, outlining the measures he pledged to take on behalf of the Catholic Church and other Christian churches should he win the presidency. These included advocating for "respect for the right to life from the moment of conception," granting churches access to the media, granting free admission to public health centers, prisons, orphanages and nursing homes for priests and other ministers of worship, standardizing seminary coursework with public institution coursework, in addition to giving churches a unique tax system and allowing them to deduct taxes "when they contribute to human development."

Fox reaffirmed his strong religious stance and identified himself as a devout Catholic. Even though Fox had finally won the presidency, the promises he made to the churches in that letter were not kept given that the PAN failed to secure an absolute majority in the Congress of the Union.

== Opinion polls ==
PRI candidate Francisco Labastida led in nearly all the polls throughout the first months of the campaign, although in the final two months his lead grew smaller; on the other hand, PAN candidate Vicente Fox was at second place in most of the polls, but in May and June his percentage of supporters increased and he led in many of the final polls.

Given that the overwhelming majority of the polls failed to predict Fox's victory and instead had indicated that Labastida would win by comfortable margins, it has been asserted that many of those polled lied about their preferences, fearing that if they stated support for an opposition party, they would be stripped of the government assistance programs they were receiving by the PRI. The Reforma newspaper, which had predicted a Labastida victory in every poll they published during the campaign, attributed their mistake to the so-called "fear factor".

Date	Poll source	Fox PAN	Labastida PRI	Cárdenas PRD	Others	Sample size	Ref.
November 1999	Mund Opinion	39%	43%	18%	0%	N/A	
November 1999	Indermec	44%	39%	16%	0%	N/A	
November 1999	GEA	38%	41.8%	16.5%	3.7%	1200	
November 1999	Reforma	33.3%	53.1%	9.9%	3.7%	1542	
November 1999	El Universal	33.8%	46.2%	11.7%	8.3%	1537	
November 1999	CEO	37%	47%	11%	4%	1500	
December 1999	Pearson (PRI)	34%	47%	13%	6%	1647	
December 1999	El Universal	39.2%	47.1%	12.5%	1.2%	1475	
December 1999	Milenio	37.8%	42.2%	17.8%	2.2%	1006	
January 2000	CEPROSEPP	32%	51%	11%	6%	1510	
January 2000	Reforma	38.6%	48.2%	12.0%	1.2%	1544	
January 2000	GAUSCC (PAN)	39%	45%	14%	2%	20 866	
January 2000	Pearson (PRI)	36.7%	49.7%	11.9%	1.7%	1678	
January 2000	GAUSSC (PAN)	42.4%	43.5%	13.0%	1.1%	1500	
February 2000	Milenio	41.1%	42.2%	14.5%	2.2%	1200	
February 2000	CEPROSEPP	32.4%	45.5%	16.1%	6.0%	1346	
February 2000	GEA	44%	36%	18%	2%	1113	
February 2000	Technomgmt.	34.5%	45.3%	17.2%	3.0%	2697	
February 2000	El Universal	38.8%	41.8%	15.7%	3.7%	1438	
February 2000	Reforma	38.6%	47.0%	13.2%	1.2%	1510	
February 2000	Reforma	37.8%	50.0%	11.0%	1.2%	2397	
February 2000	Mund Opinion	35.7%	40.5%	22.6%	1.2%	1182	
March 2000	CEPROSEPP	31.8%	46.1%	17.0%	5.1%	1322	
March 2000	Pearson (PRI)	33.4%	51.6%	13.6%	1.5%	1127	
March 2000	Milenio	39.3%	41.6%	16.9%	2.2%	1200	
March 2000	El Universal	39.7%	45.0%	12.7%	2.6%	1438	
March 2000	Reforma	38.6%	47.0%	13.3%	1.2%	1533	
March 2000	GEA	43.3%	38.8%	16.5%	1.4%	1200	
March 2000	Technomgmt.	32.3%	47.9%	17.0%	2.8%	N/A	
April 2000	CEPROSEPP	31.2%	45.7%	17.6%	5.5%	N/A	
April 2000	GAUSSC	41.4%	46.0%	12.3%	0.3%	1500	
April 2000	Technomgmt.	32.7%	47.4%	17.7%	2.2%	N/A	
April 2000	Reforma	42%	45%	12%	1%	1647	
April 2000	Quantum	36.9%	50.4%	10.0%	2.7%	1920	
April 2000	El Universal	39.2%	42.2%	14.0%	4.5%	1074	
April 2000	Reuters/Zogby	46.3%	41.6%	9.3%	2.8%	1062	
May 2000	Pearson (PRI)	39%	45%	12%	4%	1590	
May 2000	Technomgmt.	39.1%	45.5%	12.5%	2.9%	8000	
May 2000	Reforma	40%	42%	16%	2%	1547	
May 2000	GEA	43.6%	38.6%	16.4%	1.4%	N/A	
May 2000	El Universal	42.2%	35.9%	16.2%	5.7%	1787	
May 2000	Milenio	36%	43%	17%	4%	2005	
May 2000	CEO	39.0%	42.7%	15.1%	3.2%	2450	
June 2000	Alduncin	41%	35%	20%	4%	2095	
June 2000	Alduncin	41%	35%	20%	4%	2095	
June 2000	CEO	39%	43%	15%	3%	2423	
June 2000	ARCOP	43%	38%	17%	3%	1400	
June 2000	Fishers	36%	42%	19%	3%	2750	
June 2000	GEA	39%	38%	19%	3%	2287	
June 2000	Mund/Dalla	36%	37%	27%	0%	1362	
June 2000	Reforma	39%	42%	16%	3%	1545	
June 2000	Reuters	41%	44%	15%	1%	1330	
June 2000	CM Político	38%	41%	18%	3%	1800	
June 2000	D. Watch	41%	36%	20%	3%	1542	
June 2000	Pearson	39%	43%	15%	3%	1309	
June 2000	Milenio/Nielsen	36%	42%	16%	6%	N/A	

== Conduct ==
Some isolated incidents of irregularities and problems were reported. For example, one irregularity in the southern state of Campeche involved the European Union electoral observer Rocco Buttiglione and could have created problems for President Ernesto Zedillo had the PRI candidate won. Overall, however, electoral observers identified little evidence that those incidents were centrally coordinated (as opposed to led by local PRI officials), and critics concluded that those irregularities which did occur did not materially alter the outcome of the presidential vote, which had been more definitive than expected.

Civic organizations fielded more than 80,000 trained electoral observers, foreign observers were invited to witness the process, and numerous "quick count" operations and exit polls (not all of them independent) validated the official vote tabulation. The largest exit poll was organized by the U.S. firm Penn, Schoen & Berland, financed by a Dallas-based organization called Democracy Watch with the support of the Vicente Fox campaign, who were concerned about possible election fraud.

Numerous electoral reforms implemented after the widely-derided and fraudulent 1988 election opened up the Mexican political system, and since then opposition parties have made historic gains in elections at all levels. The chief electoral concerns shifted from outright fraud to campaign fairness issues and, between 1995 and 1996, the political parties negotiated constitutional amendments to address these issues. The legislation implemented included major points of consensus that had been worked out with the opposition parties. Under the new laws, public financing predominated over private contributions to political parties, procedures for auditing parties were tightened, and the authority and independence of the electoral institutions were strengthened. The court system was also given greatly expanded authority to hear civil rights cases on electoral matters brought by individuals or groups. In short, the extensive reform efforts of the 1990s "leveled the playing field" for the parties.

== Results ==
=== President ===
Candidate	Party	Votes	%
Vicente Fox	National Action Party	15,989,636	43.43
Francisco Labastida	Institutional Revolutionary Party	13,579,718	36.89
Cuauhtémoc Cárdenas	Party of the Democratic Revolution	6,256,780	17.00
Gilberto Rincón Gallardo	Social Democracy	592,381	1.61
Manuel Camacho Solís	Democratic Center Party of Mexico	206,589	0.56
Porfirio Muñoz Ledo	Authentic Party of the Mexican Revolution	156,896	0.43
Other candidates		31,461	0.09
Total		36,813,461	100.00
Valid votes		36,813,461	97.90
Invalid/blank votes		788,157	2.10
Total votes		37,601,618	100.00
Registered voters/turnout		58,782,737	63.97
Source: Nohlen, INE

==== By state ====
State	Fox	Labastida	Cárdenas	Rincón	Camacho	Muñoz	Write-in	None
Aguascalientes	202,335	127,134	26,264	9,467	2,202	1,389	83	6,291
Baja California	429,194	319,477	77,340	14,562	3,470	3,080	507	14,965
Baja California Sur	60,834	56,230	45,229	2,107	460	364	17	2,804
Campeche	104,498	106,347	35,090	2,485	1,406	1,247	559	9,309
Chiapas	288,204	469,392	272,182	5,340	4,659	4,063	1,056	44,551
Chihuahua	549,177	460,931	76,810	11,569	4,487	3,166	609	21,350
Coahuila	398,800	311,480	77,393	10,392	2,111	1,880	1,454	12,464
Colima	106,445	81,099	23,313	3,159	1,028	542	39	4,377
Distrito Federal	1,928,035	1,060,227	1,146,131	149,312	36,383	18,843	2,009	75,669
Durango	211,361	222,892	50,592	6,144	1,579	1,469	859	9,294
Guanajuato	1,128,780	517,815	121,489	18,248	10,800	8,473	2,873	49,039
Guerrero	174,962	402,091	332,091	6,179	2,913	3,003	954	20,180
Hidalgo	282,864	355,565	136,861	12,319	5,034	4,078	758	19,997
Jalisco	1,392,535	941,962	163,269	45,494	17,567	11,110	3,287	48,736
México	2,239,750	1,637,714	961,876	121,137	40,733	27,203	3,416	92,743
Michoacán	419,188	441,871	543,804	13,058	7,444	6,404	2,060	30,448
Morelos	290,639	193,861	124,368	12,539	2,916	3,010	136	12,296
Nayarit	107,417	173,479	63,121	3,092	1,175	1,024	351	7,043
Nuevo León	760,093	615,907	96,637	20,448	7,478	2,658	1,519	27,201
Oaxaca	301,195	486,496	282,587	11,074	8,372	7,305	1,851	39,616
Puebla	732,435	698,974	208,688	20,170	8,609	7,849	1,142	44,305
Querétaro	290,977	192,622	39,629	10,585	3,768	8,670	170	13,849
Quintana Roo	132,383	94,202	50,487	2,399	916	729	70	5,216
San Luis Potosí	393,997	324,234	72,599	11,073	3,306	2,287	407	22,673
Sinaloa	230,777	621,329	90,488	7,205	2,189	1,675	1,290	15,920
Sonora	447,496	292,267	114,580	6,426	1,672	1,325	94	13,269
Tabasco	174,840	269,519	213,983	5,817	2,599	1,732	655	14,036
Tamaulipas	521,486	445,737	91,426	9,387	3,210	6,932	1,157	19,659
Tlaxcala	123,880	127,163	82,073	5,185	2,508	1,450	53	6,639
Veracruz	1,066,719	1,008,933	491,791	25,474	11,343	10,956	985	58,630
Yucatán	328,503	321,392	27,214	4,258	1,344	987	602	13,127
Zacatecas	169,837	197,336	117,375	6,277	2,908	1,993	439	12,461
Total	15,989,636	13,579,718	6,256,780	592,381	206,589	156,896	31,461	788,157
Source: IFE

==== Voter demographics ====
Demographic subgroup	Fox	Labastida	Cárdenas	Other	% of total vote
Total vote	42	36	16	6	100
Gender
Men	47	32	20	1	52
Women	43	40	14	3	48
Age
18-24	50	32	17	1	18
25-29	47	34	16	3	16
30-34	49	34	15	2	15
35-39	47	37	12	4	13
40-45	41	35	20	4	11
46-50	44	37	18	1	8
51-54	46	40	13	1	6
55-59	32	43	24	1	5
60+	35	42	22	1	8
Education
None	30	46	21	3	8
Primary	35	46	18	1	34
Secondary	49	34	15	2	22
Preparatory	53	28	16	3	21
University	60	22	15	3	15
Employment
Public sector	41	37	19	3	18
Private sector	53	31	15	1	26
Self-employed	42	36	19	3	24
Student	59	19	17	5	5
Housewife	41	43	15	1	25
Region
North	50	37	12	1	23
Center-West	48	37	12	3	18
Center	43	34	20	3	35
South	41	37	20	2	24
Source: Reforma.

=== Senate ===
Party	Party-list			Constituency			Total seats	+/–
Party	Votes	%	Seats	Votes	%	Seats	Total seats	+/–
Alliance for Change	14,339,963	39.10	13	14,208,973	39.00	38	51	+17
Institutional Revolutionary Party	13,755,787	37.51	13	13,699,799	37.60	47	60	–16
Alliance for Mexico	7,072,994	19.29	6	7,027,944	19.29	11	17	+2
Social Democracy	676,388	1.84	0	669,725	1.84	0	0	New
Democratic Center Party of Mexico	523,569	1.43	0	521,178	1.43	0	0	New
Authentic Party of the Mexican Revolution	276,109	0.75	0	275,051	0.75	0	0	New
Non-registered candidates	30,892	0.08	0	31,079	0.09	0	0	0
Total	36,675,702	100.00	32	36,433,749	100.00	96	128	0
Valid votes	36,675,702	97.72		36,433,749	97.71			
Invalid/blank votes	854,459	2.28		852,106	2.29			
Total votes	37,530,161	100.00		37,285,855	100.00			
Registered voters/turnout	58,782,737	63.85		58,782,737	63.43			
Source: Nohlen, IFES

=== Chamber of Deputies ===
Results by coalition (left) and party (right)
Party	Party-list			Constituency			Total seats	+/–
Party	Votes	%	Seats	Votes	%	Seats	Total seats	+/–
Alliance for Change	14,323,649	39.19	81	14,212,476	39.14	143	224	+95
Institutional Revolutionary Party	13,800,306	37.75	79	13,720,453	37.79	132	211	–28
Alliance for Mexico	6,990,143	19.12	40	6,948,204	19.14	25	65	–67
Social Democracy	703,532	1.92	0	698,683	1.92	0	0	New
Democratic Center Party of Mexico	430,812	1.18	0	428,577	1.18	0	0	New
Authentic Party of the Mexican Revolution	273,615	0.75	0	272,425	0.75	0	0	New
Non-registered candidates	30,452	0.08	0	30,380	0.08	0	0	0
Total	36,552,509	100.00	200	36,311,198	100.00	300	500	0
Valid votes	36,552,509	97.68		36,311,198	97.68			
Invalid/blank votes	868,516	2.32		863,262	2.32			
Total votes	37,421,025	100.00		37,174,460	100.00			
Registered voters/turnout	58,782,737	63.66		58,782,737	63.24			
Source: Nohlen, TE

== Aftermath ==
On election night, exit polls and preliminary results from the Federal Electoral Institute quickly proclaimed PAN candidate Vicente Fox winner. PRI candidate Francisco Labastida then headed to his party's headquarters to give his concession speech, but just minutes before he was to speak, a message from President Ernesto Zedillo was broadcast on national TV, in which the President himself acknowledged Fox's victory and congratulated him. The fact that the concession first came from the President instead of his party's candidate later caused tensions between Zedillo and Labastida. Fox was sworn-in as president on 1 December, ending 71 years of PRI rule.

23 years later, in 2023, Labastida accused Zedillo of having sabotaged his presidential campaign, stating that Zedillo called three state governors to threaten them and make Labastida's campaign fail, since Zedillo wanted to hand the presidency over to the opposition party PAN in order to go down in history as a democrat who willingly gave up his party's 71-year hold on the presidency.

== Campaign items (image gallery) ==
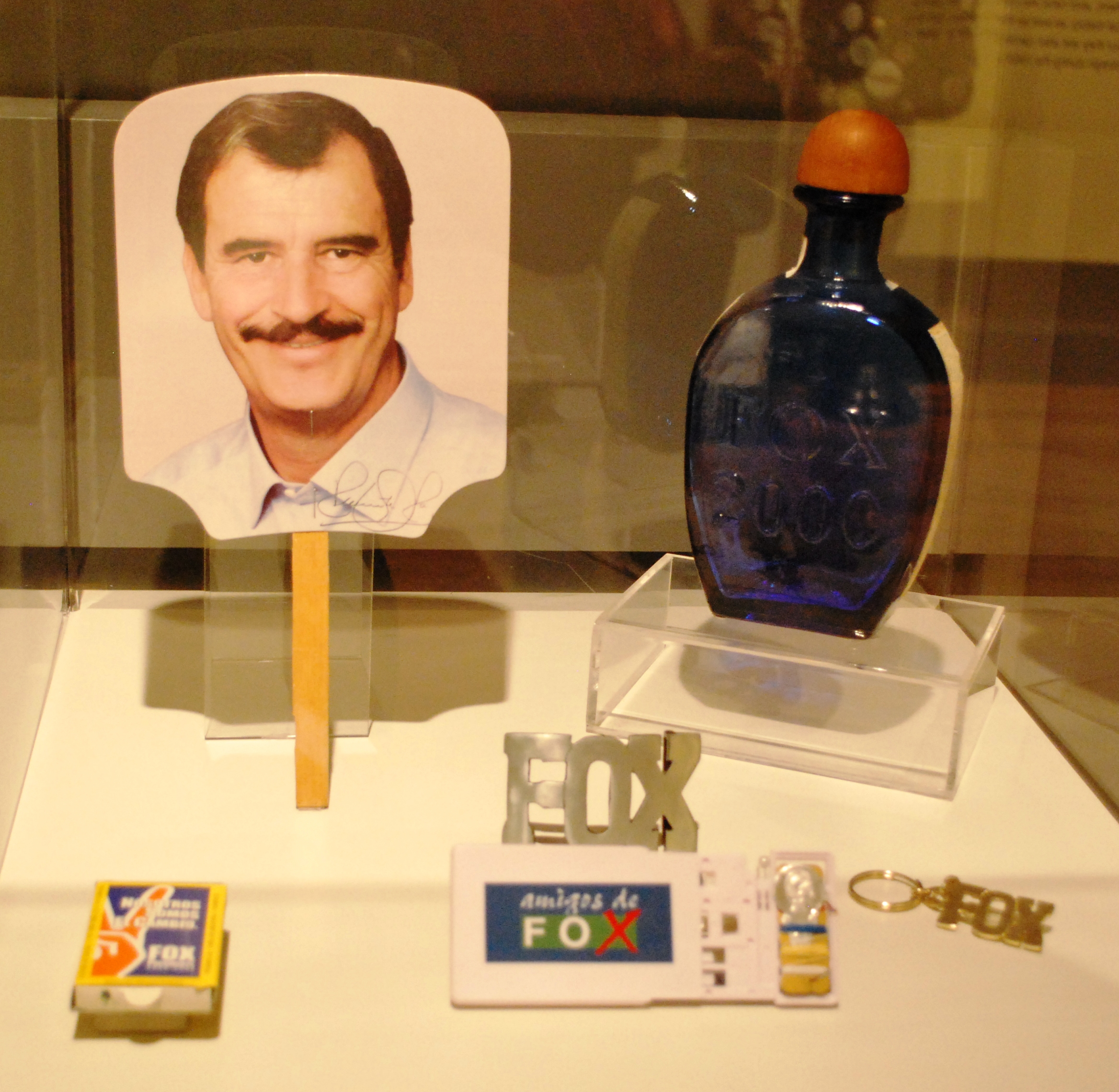
Fox campaign items.

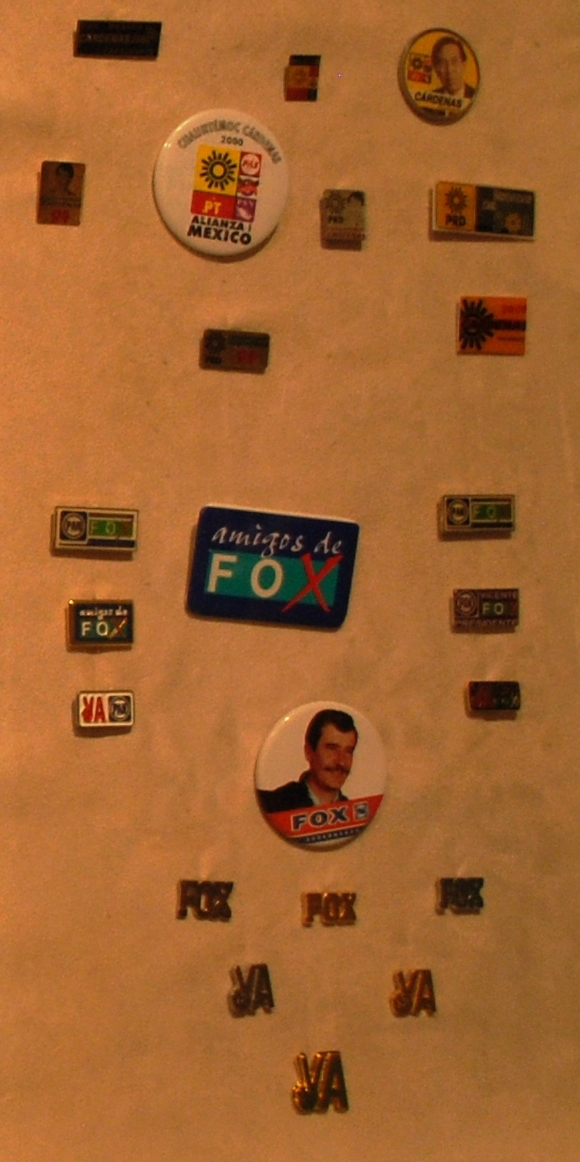
Cárdenas and Fox campaign buttons.

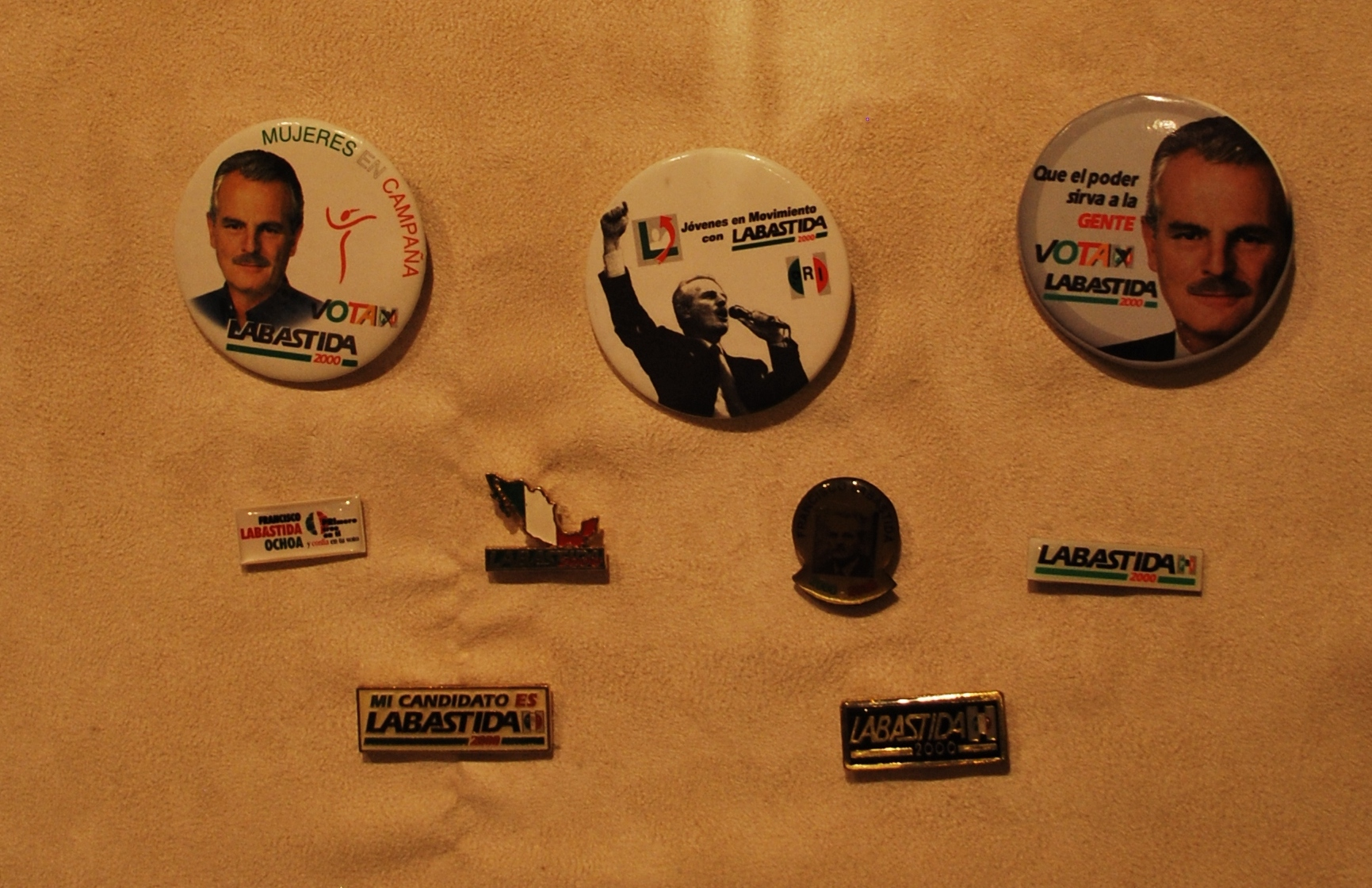
Labastida campaign buttons.

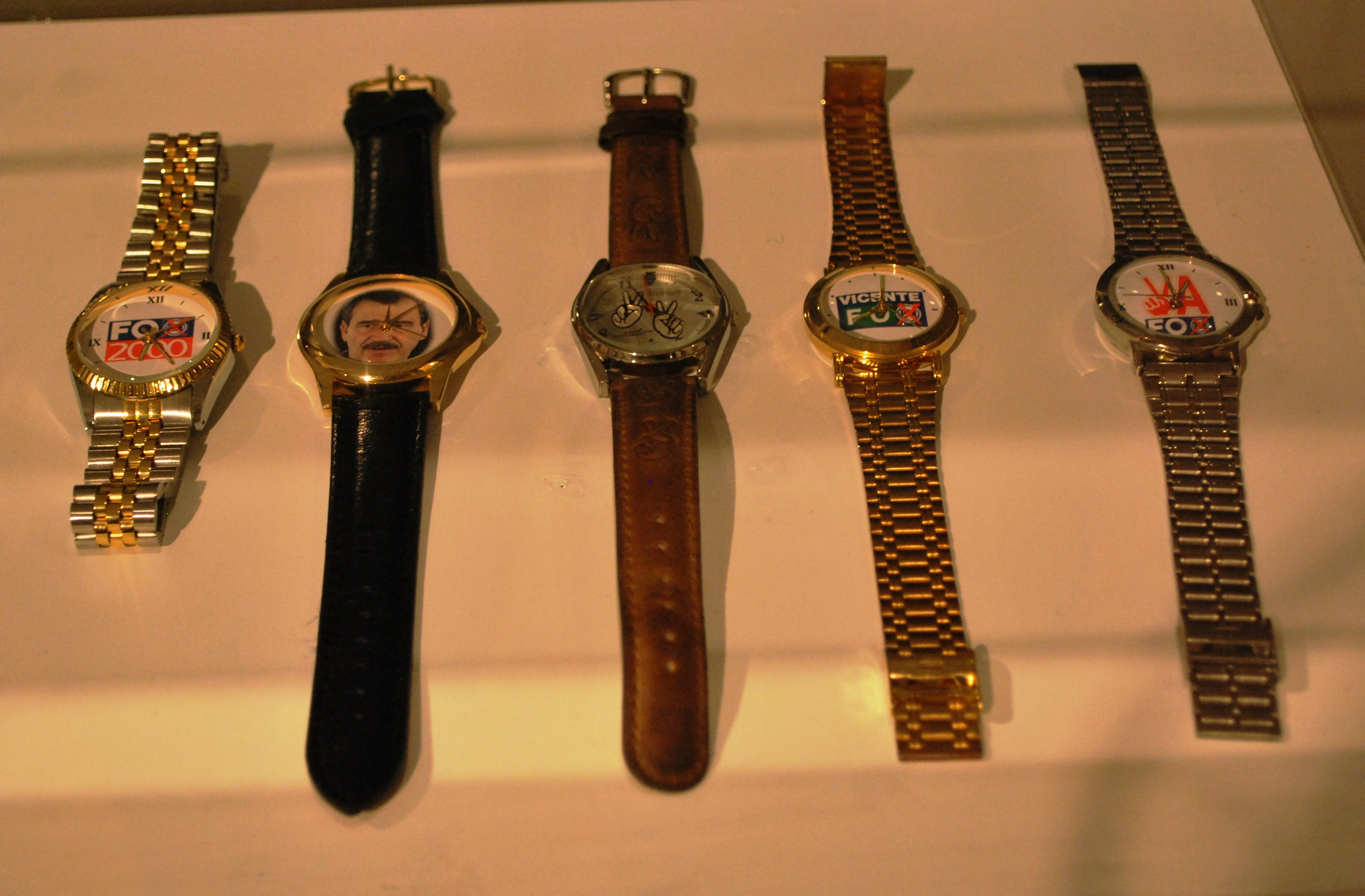
Fox campaign watches.

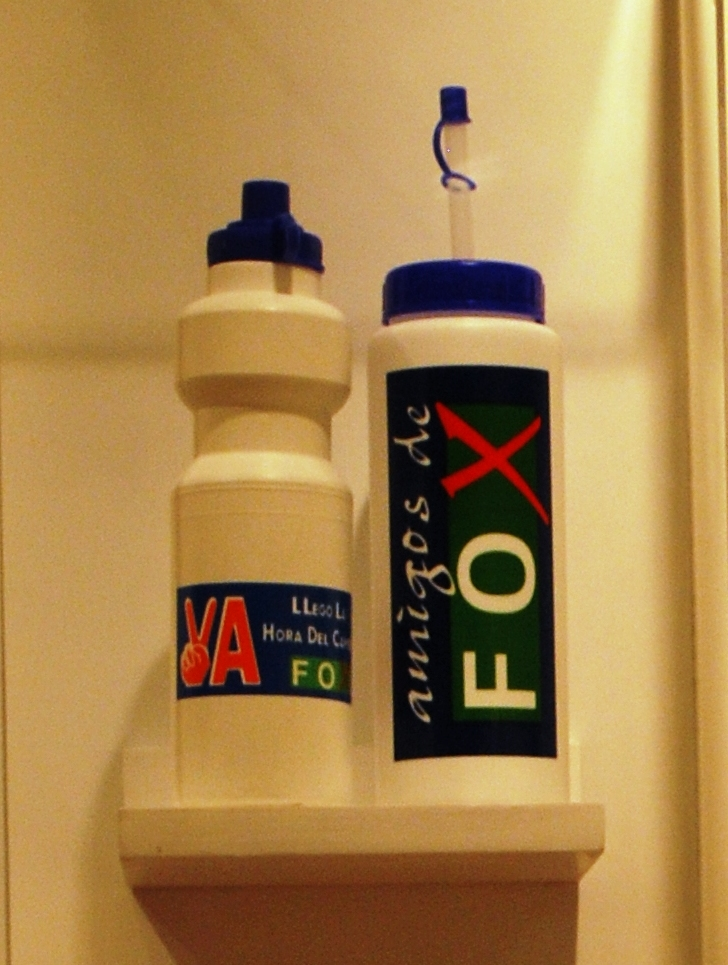
Fox campaign bottles

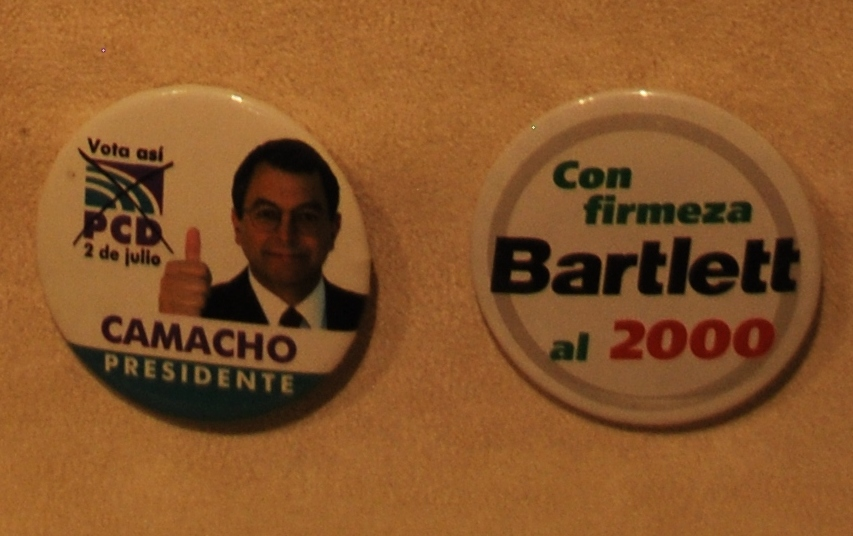
Camacho Solís and Bartlett (as PRI presidential pre-candidate) campaign buttons.
