= Party of the Nationalist Society =

- President: Gustavo Riojas Santana
- Founder: Gustavo Riojas Santana
- Founded: 1998
- Dissolved: 2003
- Headquarters: Mexico City
- Ideology: Left-wing nationalism
- Political position: Centre-left

The Party of the Nationalist Society (Spanish: Partido de la Sociedad Nacionalista, PSN) is a former political party in Mexico that existed between 1998 and 2003. Founded and led by Gustavo Riojas Santana, it was a center-left party which advocated nationalist policies.

The PSN was widely considered to be a "family party" since most of the party's top offices were occupied by relatives of Riojas Santana, allegedly for personal benefit.

In the Mexican general election of July 2, 2000, the party was a member of the Alliance for Mexico, nominating Cuauhtémoc Cárdenas as its presidential candidate. Being part of the Alliance allowed the party to remain registered as a political party after the election, as well as obtaining three seats in the Chamber of Deputies. These seats were assigned to Riojas Santana, his wife and his sister.

== Dissolution ==
In the 2003 midterm elections the PSN ran on its own and failed to obtain any seats in either chamber of the Mexican Congress. Since it also failed to secure 2.0% of the total votes, the party lost its registry as a political party. Shortly thereafter, the Federal Electoral Institute fined Riojas Santana for misuse of the public funds it assigned to the PSN for campaign purposes.
