= México Posible =

Defunct political party in Mexico

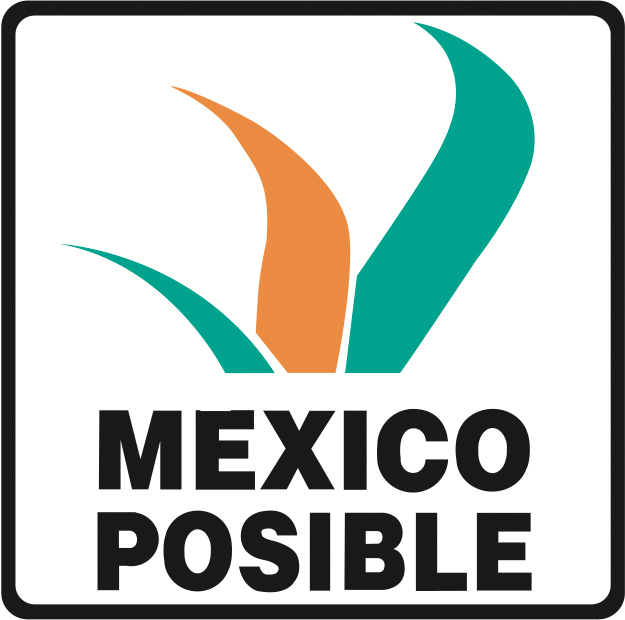
- President: Patricia Mercado (2002-2003)
- Founded: 2002
- Dissolved: 2003
- Merged into: PSD
- Ideology: Social democracy
- Political position: Centre-left

México Posible (English: Possible Mexico) was a Mexican political party of brief existence which took part in the midterm 2003 Mexican legislative election. The party was led by Patricia Mercado. Due to its not achieving 2.0% of the national vote the party lost its national registration before the Federal Electoral Institute and thus the party was disbanded.

This political group was the main cell for the new Alternativa Social y Campesina.
