= Citizen Force Party =

Political party

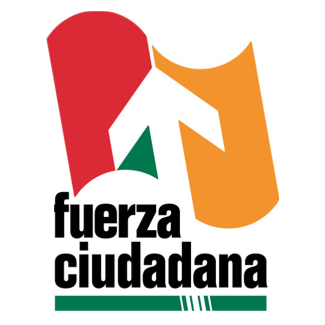
- President: Jorge Alcocer Villanueva
- Founded: 2002
- Dissolved: 2003
- Merged into: Social Democratic Party (Mexico)
- Ideology: Democracy
- Political position: Centre

Citizen Force Party (Spanish: Fuerza Ciudadana, FC) was a Mexican political party between 2002 and 2003, created by former PRI politician Jorge Alcocer Villanueva, Alongside other former PRI members. their postulates did not fit within the traditional political phantom of left or right, but that it looked for to be one more an option for the citizen policy.

== Dissoulution ==
Citizen Force Party participated in the 2003 elections in which did not manage to obtain 2% minimum of votes to maintain the registry, thus losing it and it disappeared as a political party.
