= Chamber of Deputies (Mexico) =

Lower house of the legislature of Mexico

Coordinates: 19°25′48″N 99°07′04″W

Chamber of Deputies Cámara de Diputados
- LXVI Legislature
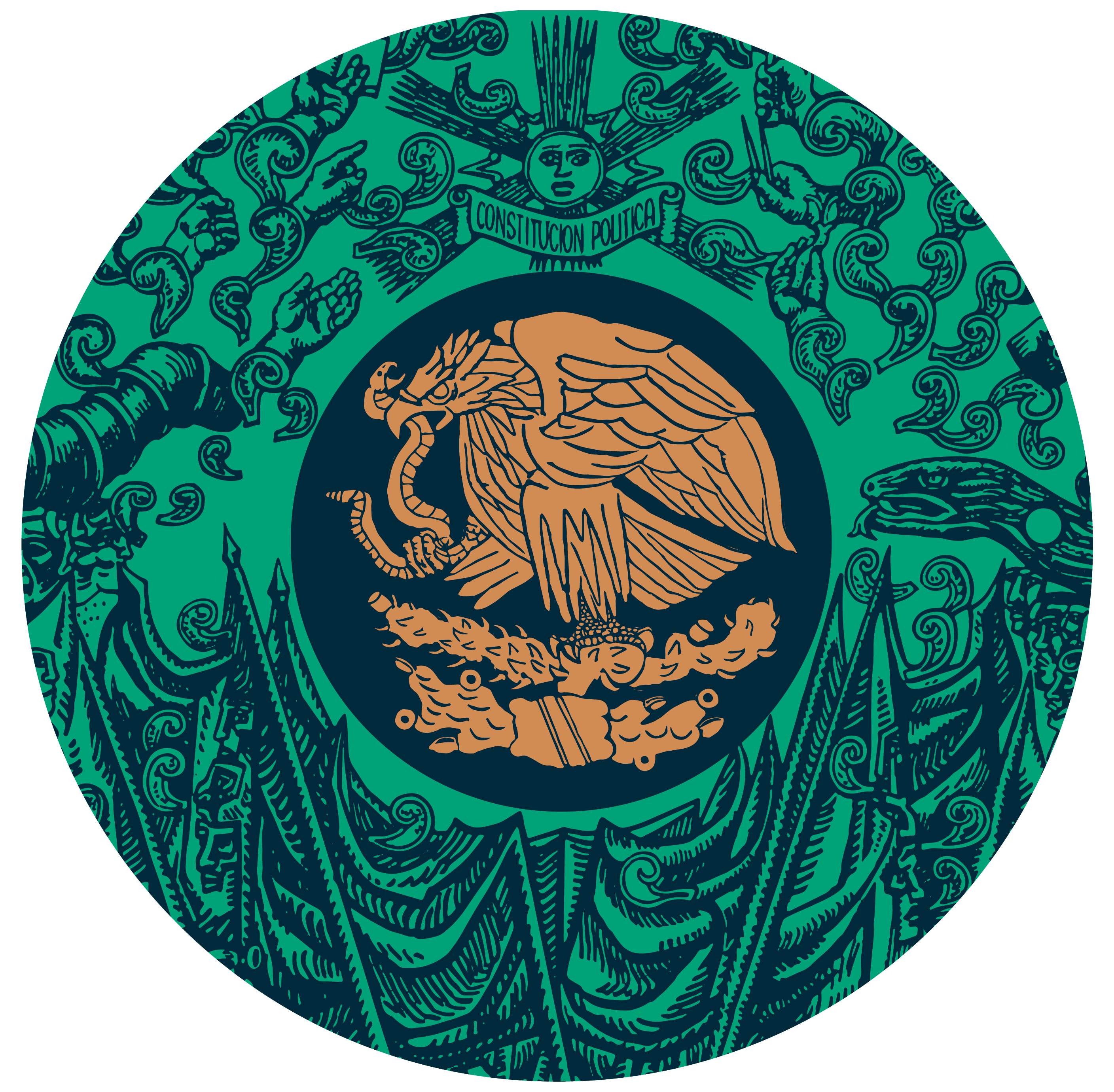

Type
- Type: Lower house of the Congress of Mexico
- Term limits: Up to four consecutive terms; no limit to non-consecutive terms

History
- Founded: 4 October 1824

Leadership
- President: Raúl Bolaños Cacho Cué (PVEM) since 1 September 2026

Structure
- Seats: 500
- Political groups: Government (366): Morena (254); PVEM (62); PT (49); Independent (1); Opposition (134): PAN (69); PRI (36); MC (29)
- Length of term: 3 years

Elections
- Voting system: Parallel voting 300 seats elected by first-past-the-post 200 seats elected by proportional representation (largest remainder method)
- Last election: 2 June 2024
- Next election: 6 June 2027

Meeting place
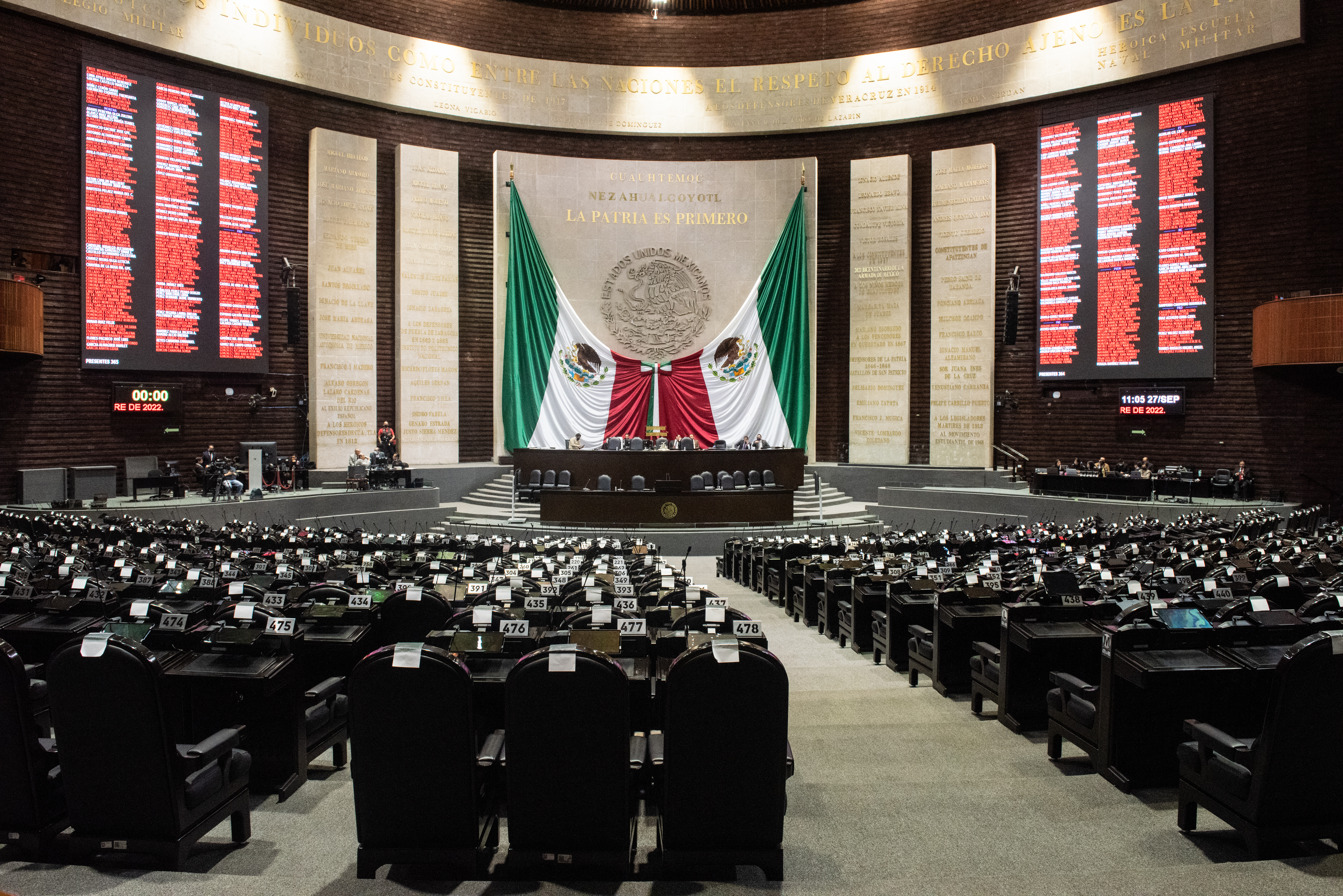
- Chamber of Deputies; San Lázaro Legislative Building; Mexico City; Mexico

Website
- web.diputados.gob.mx

Footnotes
- Deputies information

The Chamber of Deputies (Spanish: Cámara de Diputados, pronounced [ˈkamaɾa ðe ðipuˈtaðos]), constitutionally the Chamber of Deputies of the Honorable Congress of the Union (Spanish: Cámara de Diputados del H. Congreso de la Unión), is the lower house of the Congress of the Union, the bicameral congress of Mexico. The other chamber is the Senate. The structure and responsibilities of both chambers of Congress are defined in Articles 50 to 70 of the Constitution.

== History ==
A bicameral legislature, including the Chamber of Deputies, was established on 4 October 1824. A unicameral congress existed from 7 September 1857 to 13 November 1874.

== Elections and qualifications ==
=== Qualifications ===
Article 55 of the Mexican Constitution establishes the requirements to serve as a deputy. To be eligible, a candidate must:

- Be a Mexican citizen by birth with full legal rights.
- Be at least 18 years old on election day.
- Be a resident of, or have lived in, the state they seek to represent for at least six months prior to the election.
- Not be on active military duty or hold a police command within 90 days before the election.
- Not be a minister of any religious faith.

The article also imposes restrictions on public officials seeking election:

- Governors and the Head of Government of Mexico City cannot be elected as deputies in their respective jurisdictions during their terms, even if they resign.
- Ministers of the Supreme Court, magistrates or secretaries of the Electoral Tribunal of the Federal Judiciary, members of the General, local, or district councils of the National Electoral Institute (INE), or senior executives within INE must resign at least three years before the election.
- State secretaries, federal and local magistrates and judges, as well as municipal presidents and mayors in Mexico City, must resign at least 90 days before the election to be eligible.
- Officials holding leadership positions in autonomous constitutional bodies, as well as Secretaries or Undersecretaries of State and heads of decentralized or deconcentrated federal agencies, must also resign at least 90 days before the election.

=== Elections ===
The Chamber of Deputies comprises one federal deputy (in Spanish: diputado federal) for approximately every 250,000 citizens. The Chamber has 500 members, elected using the parallel voting system.

Of the 500 deputies, 300 are elected by plurality from single-member districts, known as federal electoral districts, with each state having at least two districts, as stipulated in Articles 52 and 53 of the Constitution. The remaining 200 deputies are assigned through proportional representation across five multi-state, 40-seat electoral regions (circunscripciones), in accordance with Articles 53 and 54. These seats, not tied to specific districts, are distributed to parties based on their share of the vote within each electoral region, serving as a counterbalance to district-based representation. Deputies are elected alongside substitutes, known as alternates, making special elections rare.

Article 59 of the Mexican Constitution allows deputies to be reelected for up to three consecutive terms, but only for the party under which they were originally elected—unless they resign from the party before the midpoint of their term. From 1917 to 2015, a constitutional ban on immediate reelection required a complete renewal of the Chamber of Deputies at each election, making it one of the few legislative bodies in the world subject to complete renewal at each election.

Elections are held every three years. Congressional elections held midway through a six-year presidential term are referred to as midterm elections.

=== Terms and reelection ===
Deputies serve three-year terms, beginning on 1 September following an election, with swearing-in typically occurring two to three days prior. Before 1933, terms lasted two years.

== Governing bodies ==
=== Board of Directors ===
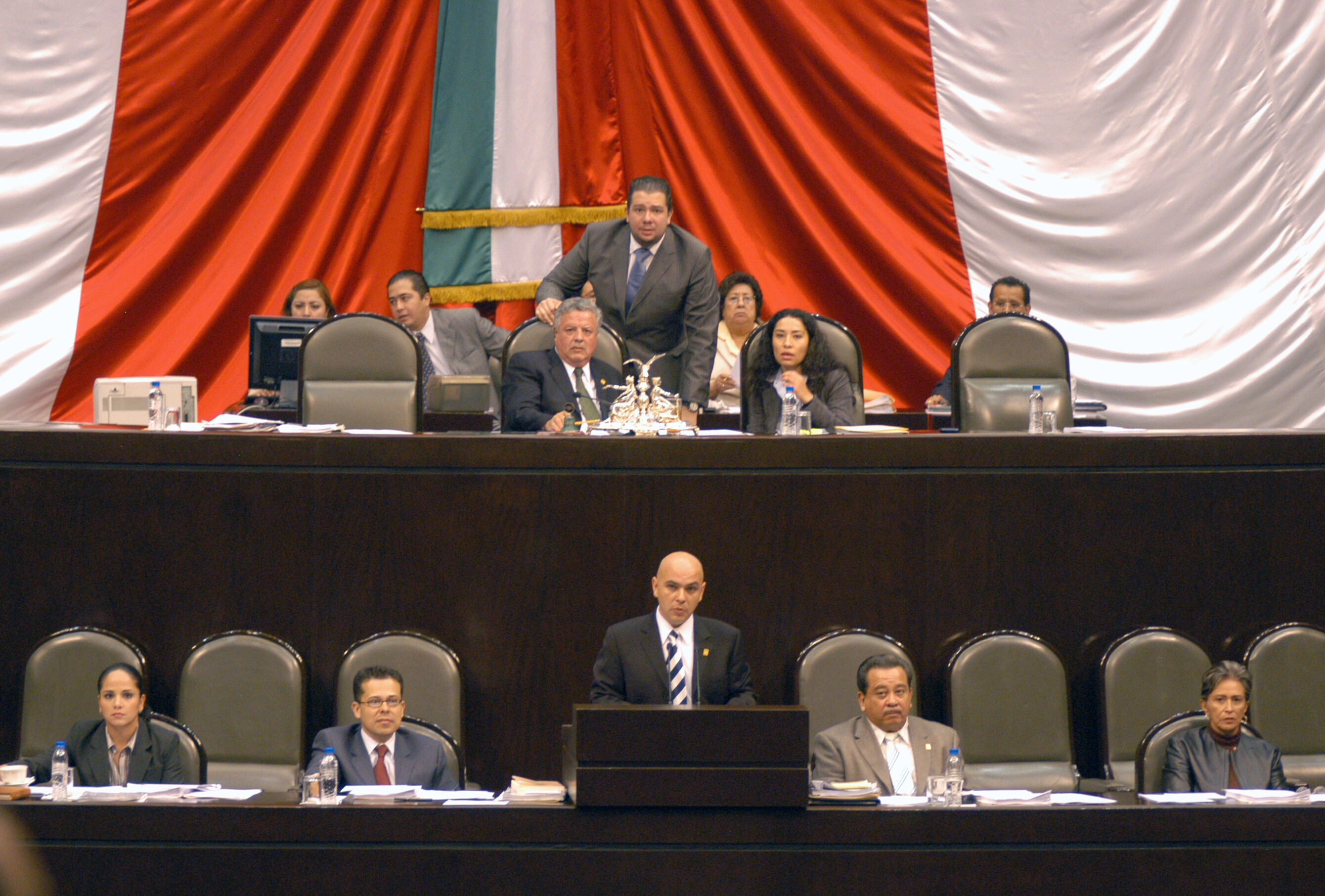
President and Vice Presidents (seated at the top), Secretaries (seated below), Podium (center).

The Board of Directors oversees the sessions of the Chamber of Deputies, ensuring that debates, discussions, and votes comply with the Constitution and the law. It is elected during the constitutive session on August 29, three days before the start of the legislative term following an election. The Board consists of a President, four Vice Presidents, and seven Secretaries. The President of the Chamber of Deputies serves as the Chamber's highest authority and official representative, also assuming the role of President of the Congress of the Union during joint-sessions of the General Congress.

According to Article 17 of the Organic Law of the General Congress of the United Mexican States, each member of the Board is elected for a one-year term with the possibility of reelection. The Board is elected by a two-thirds majority, with candidates nominated by each parliamentary group.

=== Political Coordination Board ===
The Political Coordination Board (JUCOPO) is the governing body responsible for facilitating political dialogue, negotiations, and consensus-building within the Chamber of Deputies, in accordance with Article 34 of the Organic Law of the General Congress of the United Mexican States. It promotes agreements among parliamentary groups to streamline the legislative process, oversees political debates, formulates the legislative agenda, and negotiates proposals and initiatives. Additionally, it manages the Chamber’s budget, allocates resources to parliamentary groups, proposes the composition of committees, and participates in the appointment process for autonomous bodies.

Article 31 states that the JUCOPO consists of the coordinators of each parliamentary group. The presidency is held for the full three-year term by the coordinator of the party with an absolute majority; if no party holds an absolute majority, the position rotates annually among the coordinators of the three largest parliamentary groups.

=== Parliamentary groups ===
Article 27 of the Organic Law of the General Congress of the United Mexican States states that a parliamentary group consists of deputies organized according to their party affiliation. Each group must have at least five members, and only one group can exist per national political party with representation in the Chamber of Deputies. Each parliamentary group is led by a coordinator.

== Historical composition ==
This chart shows the historical composition of the Chamber of Deputies, from the 50th Congress to the present day.

Chamber of Deputies, 1976 to present

PCM / PAN / PRI / PARM / PPS / PST / PRT / PDM / PSUM / PMT / PFCRN / PMS / PRD / PVEM / PT / MC / PAS / PSN / PSD / PANAL / MORENA / PES			Total
50th	1976	10 / 12 / 195 / 20	237
51st	1979	18 / 10 / 12 / 11 / 296 / 43 / 10	400
52nd	1982	17 / 11 / 10 / 299 / 51 / 12	400
53rd	1985	12 / 12 / 6 / 11 / 6 / 11 / 289 / 41 / 12	400
54th	1988	19 / 50 / 33 / 36 / 262 / 100	500
55th	1991	12 / 15 / 23 / 41 / 320 / 89	500
56th	1994	10 / 71 / 300 / 119	500
57th	1997	7 / 125 / 239 / 8 / 121	500
58th	2000	8 / 50 / 3 / 3 / 211 / 17 / 206 / 2	500
59th	2003	6 / 97 / 5 / 224 / 17 / 151	500
60th	2006	15 / 127 / 4 / 16 / 106 / 17 / 206 / 9	500
61st	2009	15 / 71 / 7 / 236 / 21 / 141 / 9	500
62nd	2012	15 / 103 / 17 / 213 / 28 / 114 / 10	500
63rd	2015	35 / 61 / 25 / 203 / 47 / 109 / 11 / 8 / 1	500
64th	2018	61 / 191 / 21 / 27 / 45 / 16 / 81 / 2 / 56	500
65th	2021	37 / 198 / 43 / 15 / 23 / 70 / 114	500
66th	2024	51 / 236 / 77 / 1 / 27 / 35 / 72 / 1	500

== Latest election results and party standings ==
The current composition of the Chamber of Deputies:

↓
49	254	62	29	36	69	1

Party	Single-member districts	Proportional representation	Total seats
National Regeneration Movement	179	75	254
National Action Party	30	39	69
Ecologist Green Party of Mexico	41	21	62
Labor Party	36	13	49
Institutional Revolutionary Party	11	25	36
Citizens' Movement	2	27	29
Independent	1	–	1
Total	300	200	500

== See also ==
- President of the Chamber of Deputies
- Congress of the Union
- Senate of the Republic
- Politics of Mexico
- Electoral regions of Mexico
