= Manuel Moreno Sánchez =

Mexican politician (1908–1993)

- Born: 11 July 1908; Aguascalientes, Ags., Mexico
- Died: 25 April 1993 (aged 84); Aguascalientes, Ags., Mexico
- Education: UNAM
- Occupations: Jurist, politician, diplomat
- Political party: PRI, PSD
- Spouse: Carmen Toscano
- Children: 4

Manuel Moreno Sánchez (Note: In this Mexican name, the surname is Moreno and the second or maternal family name is Sánchez.) (11 July 1908 – 25 April 1993) was a Mexican politician. Originally affiliated with the Institutional Revolutionary Party (PRI) (at first under its earlier name, the Party of the Mexican Revolution), he broke with them and founded his own short-lived Social Democratic Party (PSD). He ran – unsuccessfully – as the PSD's candidate in the 1982 presidential election.

== Political career ==
Manuel Moreno Sánchez was born in Aguascalientes, Aguascalientes, in 1908. He earned a law degree from the National Autonomous University of Mexico (UNAM) in 1932 and, while a student, his political engagement began with his support for the unsuccessful campaign of José Vasconcelos in the 1929 presidential election. He later taught at the UNAM and at the University of San Nicolás de Hidalgo in Michoacán and the Autonomous University of San Luis Potosí. He served as a judge on the Supreme Court of Michoacán in 1933–1934 and on the Superior Court of Justice of the Federal District in 1940–1943.

In the 1943 mid-term federal election he was elected to the Chamber of Deputies for the 2nd district of Aguascalientes and, as president of the Chamber, he gave the official reply to President Manuel Ávila Camacho's third State of the Nation report later that year. In the 1958 general election, he was elected to the Senate for the state of Aguascalientes. He also served as ambassador to several countries, including Venezuela in 1959 and Italy in 1960.

Moreno Sánchez broke with the PRI in 1968 during the presidency of Gustavo Díaz Ordaz. Following the 1977 political reforms that facilitated the registration of opposition parties, he founded the Social Democratic Party (PSD) on 14 December 1980. He contended for the presidency as the PSD's candidate in the 1982 presidential election but placed seventh in a field of seven with 0.20% of the vote. While the poor electoral result led to the party's dissolution later that year, Porfirio Muñoz Ledo later described it as "the first significant rupture within the hegemonic party since Gen. Henríquez Guzmán three decades earlier".

In April 1987, at his ranch in Ocoyoacac, State of Mexico, Moreno Sánchez hosted a luncheon at which the formation of what was known as the "Democratic Current" (Corriente Democrática) within the PRI was announced. Those in attendance included Muñoz Ledo and Cuauhtémoc Cárdenas who, after the Democratic Current broke with the PRI, contended as an opposition candidate for the National Democratic Front in the disputed 1988 presidential election.

Manuel Moreno Sánchez died in the city of Aguascalientes on 25 April 1993.

== Personal life ==
Moreno Sánchez was married to Carmen Toscano (1910–1988), with whom he had four children: Alejandra, a cultural historian whose positions have included director of the National Archives; Carmen, a career diplomat who was appointed ambassador to Nicaragua in 2019; Héctor, who was elected to Congress for the State of Mexico's 31st district in 1979; and Octavio, who was elected to Congress for the State of Mexico's 3rd district in 1988.

== Writings ==
Moreno Sánchez contributed to a range of periodicals, such as Barandal, Siempre! and Unomásuno. His publications included:

- Notas desde Abraham Ángel (1930)
- Imperialismo y derecho internacional (1932)
- Política ejidal (1961)
- Crisis política en México (1970)
- México 1968–73: Crisis y estructura (1973)
