= Rafael Solana =

Mexican writer and playwright (1915-1992)

- Born: August 7, 1915; Veracruz
- Died: September 6, 1992 (aged 77); Mexico City
- Alma mater: National Autonomous University of Mexico
- Occupations: writer; poet; journalist; critic; playwright
- Writing career
- Period: (1930-1992)
- Notable work: There Should Be Female Bishops
- Notable awards: National Journalism Prize of Mexico 1979; National Prize for Arts and Sciences 1986

Rafael Solana Salcedo (August 7, 1915 – September 6, 1992) was a Mexican writer, poet, journalist, critic and playwright.

He is considered a cornerstone of journalism and theatrical criticism, as well as an innovator of Mexican comedy theater in the 1950s, and a promoter of dramatic arts and national culture.

== Early life ==
Solana was born in the port of Veracruz in 1915. His father, Rafael Solana Cinta, was a journalist, one of the founders of El Universal newspaper who, as a reporter, traveled with Venustiano Carranza's troops across the state of Veracruz.

Solana's family moved to Mexico City when Rafael was young. At the age of 14, he published his first stories in the Pulgarcito section of El Universal Gráfico.

As a teenager, Solana met and befriended Octavio Paz and José Revueltas, two other renowned writers.

He studied at the National Preparatory School and at the faculties of Law and Philosophy and Letters (1930–1937) at the National Autonomous University of Mexico (UNAM).

== Career ==
In 1934, at just nineteen years old, Solana released his first poetry collection, Ladera.

By 1936, he founded and published the magazine Taller poético, an individual project soon joined by Efraín Huerta, José Revueltas, and Alberto Quintero Álvarez. The magazine aimed to bring together Mexican poets, regardless of age or their affiliation with any particular group.

After four issues of Taller poético, Solana decided to expand the magazine's themes and content. He brought together a new group of young writers who had published their poems in Barandal, where his friend Octavio Paz stood out. Thanks to Solana's initiative and diplomatic approach, in 1938, the members of both publications came together to create Taller magazine.

This new magazine would gain popularity and become the most important of its time. Solana was responsible for publishing the first four issues, while the following ones were overseen by Octavio Paz. The magazine had wide circulation and published the most prominent Mexican writers of the era, as well as many intellectuals exiled due to the Spanish Civil War.

He died on September 6, 1992, in Mexico City.

== Works ==
Solana wrote seven books of poetry: Los espejos falsarios (1944), Cinco veces el mismo soneto (1948), Alas (1958), and Las estaciones (1958) and Pido la palabra (1964).

He wrote 9 novels and 22 collections of short stories.

Solana wrote 33 plays and is recognized as a renovator of Mexican theater. He frequently used humor, seeing it as one of the best ways to criticize society. His most famous and internationally known work is There Should Be Female Bishops (Spanish: Debiera haber obispas).

As a journalist he contributed to the leading newspapers and magazines of his era, including Excélsior, El Nacional, El Día and Siempre!.

== Awards and distinctions ==
In 1979, he was awarded the special prize of the National Journalism Prize of Mexico. He won the National Prize for Arts and Sciences in the area of Linguistics and Literature in 1986. He was the founder of the Mexican Association of Theater Critics (Spanish: Asociación Mexicana de Críticos de Teatro), which he led until his death. He was awarded the Juan Ruiz de Alarcón Prize 1991, Mozart Medal 1992, Honorary Doctorate from the University of Mérida and the Veracruzana University, Knight of the International Order of Public Good and the Order of Merit of France.
