= 1982 Mexican general election =

- 4 July 1982
- Presidential election
- Turnout: 74.84%
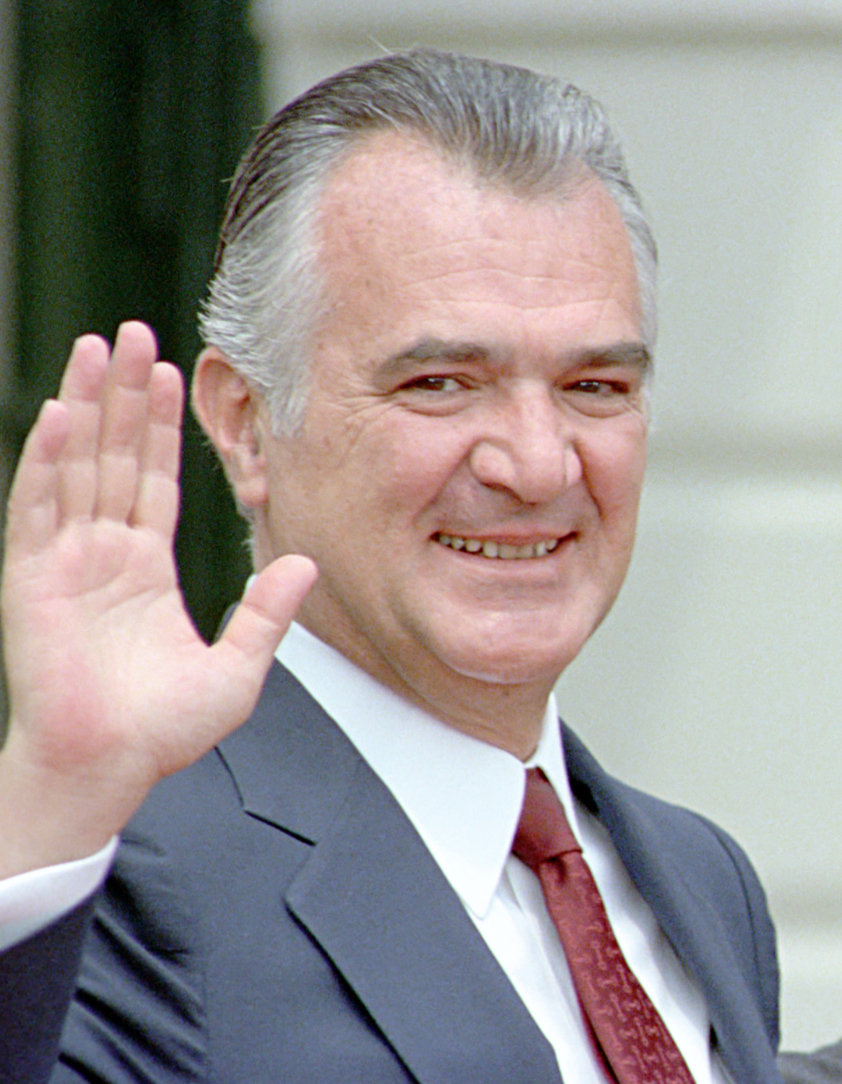

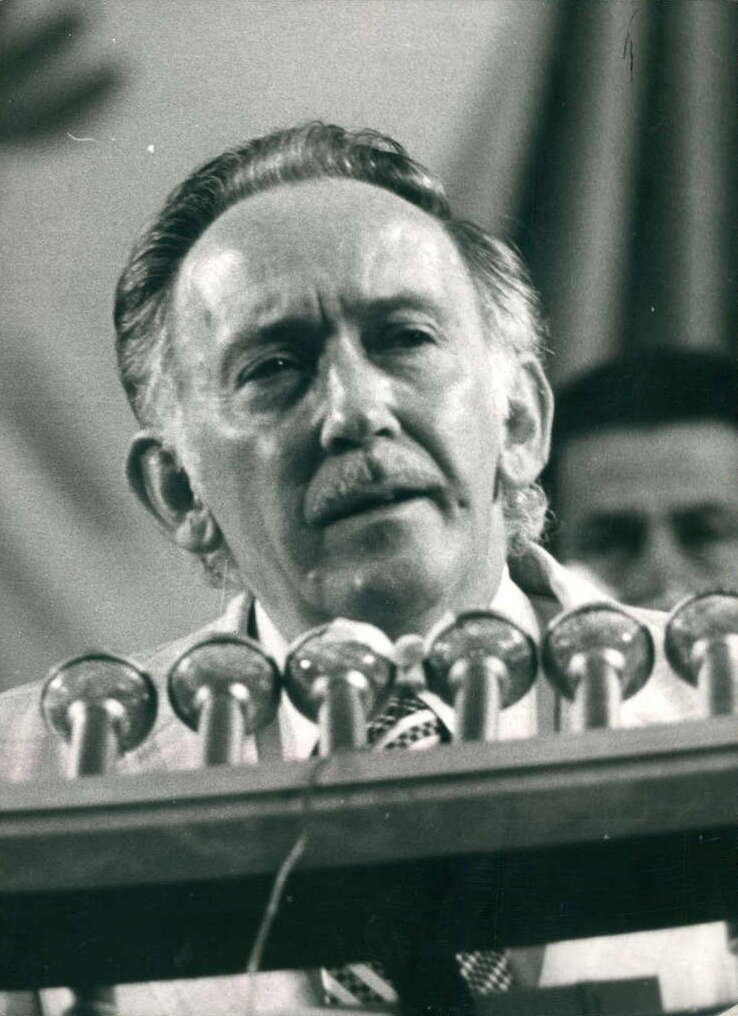
Nominee	Miguel de la Madrid	Pablo Emilio Madero
Party	PRI	PAN
Popular vote	16,748,006	3,700,045
Percentage	74.31%	16.42%
- Votes for De la Madrid by state: 50–60% 60–70% 70–80% 80–90% 90–100%
President before election
José López Portillo
PRI
Elected President
Miguel de la Madrid
PRI
- Senate
- All 64 seats in the Senate of the Republic; 33 seats needed for a majority
Party	Vote %	Seats	+/–
PRI	70.60	64	+1
PPS	4.23	0	−1
This lists parties that won seats. See the complete results below.
- Chamber of Deputies
- All 400 seats in the Chamber of Deputies; 201 seats needed for a majority
Party	Vote %	Seats	+/–
PRI	65.71	299	+3
PAN	17.41	51	+8
PSUM	4.29	17	New
PDM	2.49	12	+2
PPS	2.11	10	−1
PST	1.97	11	+1
This lists parties that won seats. See the complete results below.
Results by constituency

General elections were held in Mexico on 4 July 1982. The presidential elections were won by Miguel de la Madrid, who received 74% of the vote. In the Chamber of Deputies election, the Institutional Revolutionary Party (PRI) won 299 of the 372 seats, as well as winning 63 of the 64 seats in the Senate election. Voter turnout was 75% in the presidential election and 73% and 66% for the two parts of the Chamber elections.

The deputies elected served during the 52nd session of Congress (1982–1985), while the senators additionally served during the 53rd session (1985–1988).

Rosario Ibarra, who was nominated as a presidential candidate by the Workers' Revolutionary Party (PRT), was the first woman ever to run for president in a Mexican election.

These were the last of the symbolic/non-competitive presidential elections in which the PRI (in power since 1929) and its presidential candidate faced no serious opposition and won by a huge margin.

== Background ==
The previous presidential elections, held in 1976, had featured only one presidential candidate (José López Portillo). The lack of any opposition in that election raised serious doubts, nationally and internationally, regarding the legitimacy of the Mexican political system under the PRI, which had been in power since 1929. Due to this, a political reform was passed in 1977 which allowed many more parties to compete in federal elections (notoriously including the decades-old Mexican Communist Party, which until then had been barred from participating in elections) as well as providing better representation for opposition parties in the Chamber of the Deputies.

As a result, nine political parties were able to participate in the 1982 elections. In the presidential election, there were seven registered candidates, which at the time was the biggest number of candidates registered in a presidential election and was a stark contrast with the single-candidate election of 1976.

Nonetheless, these proved to be rather cosmetic changes, as the PRI continued to be the dominant party and practices of vote buying and electoral fraud remained widespread. It wasn't until the mid-to-late 1980s that the PRI began to face real challenges at the state and federal levels by opposition parties: particularly, by the National Action Party (PAN) and the Party of the Democratic Revolution (PRD).

== Electoral system ==
The 400 members of the Chamber of Deputies consisted of 300 elected by first-past-the-post voting in single-member districts and 100 elected by proportional representation in four electoral regions. Each of the nation's 32 states returned two senators for six-year terms.

== Designation of the PRI presidential candidate ==
By 1981 the officials that were perceived by the public opinion as having the most possibilities of being chosen by López Portillo to succeed him in the presidency were Jorge Díaz Serrano (Director General of PEMEX), Miguel de la Madrid (Secretary of Programming and the Budget, and who had known López Portillo since the 1950s when the latter was one of his teachers at the National Autonomous University of Mexico) and Javier García Paniagua (National President of the PRI). Among them, initially Díaz Serrano was apparently the most favoured to obtain the presidential candidacy, being a long-time friend of López Portillo and enjoying the popularity that came with the financial boom that the country had enjoyed in those years due to the high international oil prices and the discovery and development of new oil fields during Díaz Serrano's tenure in PEMEX, as Mexico had become one of the main oil exporters in previous years (a famous phrase in this respect was said by President López Portillo in August 1977, when he stated that the country should become used to "administering the abundance"). López Portillo had also delivered a passionate defense of Díaz Serrano and PEMEX during his third State of the Nation report to Congress in 1979 (Note: In the aftermath of the Ixtoc I oil spill that occurred in June 1979, prominent opposition politician Heberto Castillo harshly criticized PEMEX's handling of the disaster and produced documents which purportedly showed that Díaz Serrano remained a shareholder of Permargo, the company that was drilling the Ixtoc I well at the time of the accident, even though Díaz Serrano had previously stated that he had sold all of his shares before being appointed director of PEMEX.).

However, in June 1981 the international oil prices plummeted, and Díaz Serrano, without the authorization of the economic cabinet, consequently announced that Mexico would lower the prices of its oil by 4 dollars. The controversy unleashed by Díaz Serrano's decision resulted in his resignation as Director General of PEMEX and, with it, the end of his presidential aspirations.

In this manner, the two serious contenders that remained were García Paniagua and De la Madrid. García Paniagua, son of General Marcelino García Barragán, was a faithful reflection of the post-revolutionary political elite, and was identified with the "populist" sector which was more inclined to uphold the discourse of the Mexican Revolution and to continue López Portillo's general policies. In contrast, De la Madrid (who had a post graduate degree in Public Administration from Harvard University) was perceived as a skilled technocrat, mainly recognized for the elaboration of the Global Development Plan, which was announced in April 1980 and was intended to guide the planning of the economic policy of the López Portillo government.

The fall in oil prices in June 1981 radically altered the national scene, and the process of the selection of the PRI presidential candidate took place while an increasingly serious economic crisis was taking over the nation. The PRI then announced—relatively ahead of time (Note: Generally, the so called destape ("uncovering" or "unveiling"), which was the announcement by the PRI of the person chosen by the president to succeed him, would take place in October or November of the year prior to the presidential elections.)—on 25 September the chosen person to succeed López Portillo as President of the Republic: Miguel de la Madrid Hurtado.

The selection of De la Madrid was mainly due to the fact that, in the middle of the crisis which was beginning to wreak havoc in the national economy, López Portillo considered that his Secretary of Programming and the Budget was the best man to face the situation because of his administrative skill (particularly due to his elaboration of the aforementioned Global Development Plan). As De la Madrid himself would later recount, García Paniagua's reaction at not having been the chosen one was particularly aggressive, and so he was replaced in the Presidency of the PRI by Pedro Ojeda Paullada a couple of weeks after the announcement.

The designation of De la Madrid aroused significant opposition from inside the party, specially from its more traditional sectors, since the candidate was perceived as a conservative technocrat with no political skill (in fact, just like López Portillo before him, De la Madrid had never held a popularly elected post at the time of his nomination as presidential candidate). One of those dissatisfied was the old leader of the Confederación de Trabajadores de México (CTM), Fidel Velázquez, who had reportedly favoured García Paniagua. In contrast, the announcement of De la Madrid's candidacy was well received by the banking community and the private sector, which was reflected by a 10-point increase in the Mexican Stock Exchange the day of his nomination. In spite of the initial hostility by many sectors inside the PRI, in the end De la Madrid manage to consolidate his position and to gather the support of his party, agglutinating the so-called "cargada priísta" around himself.

== Campaign and economic crisis ==
After being nominated as presidential pre-candidate, De la Madrid appointed Manuel Bartlett Díaz as General Coordinator of his campaign, while he entrusted the direction of the PRI's Institute of Political, Economic and Social Studies (IEPES) to his old collaborator from the Secretariat of Programming and the Budget, Carlos Salinas de Gortari. In practice, Bartlett acted as the "political chief" of the campaign, and Salinas de Gortari was its "economic chief".

1981 and 1982 were particularly difficult years for the Mexican economy. At the time of De la Madrid's nomination in September 1981, the public finances of the nation had already begun to experience the first ravages as a consequence of the fall in oil prices in June. Nonetheless, at first the discourse of De la Madrid's campaign, while not denying the crisis, preferred to focus on other subjects and didn't deviate significantly from the traditional "nationalist" and "revolutionary" tone of previous PRI campaigns. De la Madrid proposed seven central theses as the centrepiece of his campaign: "Revolutionary nationalism", "integral democratization", "egalitarian society", "decentralization of the national life", "development, employment and fight against inflation", "democratic planning" and, the most famous of them all, "moral renovation of the society". The latter, which emphasised stopping and fighting government corruption, had a particular impact on voters, since the López Portillo administration had been mired in grave corruption scandals at all levels, involving officials appointed by the President (the more infamous cases were those of Arturo Durazo Moreno a.k.a. "El Negro Durazo", Jorge Díaz Serrano and Carlos Hank González) and even members of the president's family (many of whom also held government positions during his presidency). In this context, according to a poll from October 1981, 70% of the respondents considered that corruption in Mexico had reached "gigantic levels".

As the months passed, the economy continued to deteriorate: from September 1981 to January 1982, capital flight and distrust of the national economy skyrocketed. On 5 January 1982, the government urged people to avoid the waste of gasoline, warning that otherwise it would have to impose rationing. In February, the López Portillo government was forced to devalue the peso, leaving it at an exchange rate of 46 pesos per US dollar. By then, the government had already lost 3,000 million dollars from its international reserves. In spite of this first devaluation, speculation and capital flight did not cease, inflation continued rising, and the government had to adjust the public tariffs.

At a campaign stop at Villahermosa, De la Madrid hinted at legalizing abortion, stating that "as the rate of population growth increases, scarce resources – and I refer here to resources generally, not only economic resources – fail to keep pace with that growth", and addressed the necessity of discussing issues "such as respect for the freedom not only of the couple but especially of women, with a view to giving them truly free choices and protecting their health", explicitly referring to "the topic of abortion – a delicate matter to deal with, but one that has been touched upon here – because it is a topic that society cannot disregard".

In March, as a concession to the PRI candidate, López Portillo made some changes in his cabinet and appointed Jesús Silva-Herzog Flores and Miguel Mancera Aguayo (both close to De la Madrid) as Secretary of the Treasury and Director of the Bank of Mexico, respectively.

As the economic crisis worsened, the De la Madrid campaign began to adopt a more "realist" tone. In a speech delivered by the candidate on 24 May 1982 at León, Guanajuato, De la Madrid advocated a profound program that included fighting inflation and currency volatility, he committed to avoiding a recession and protecting employment, and he finally expressed his rejection of "populism and any form of demagogy". Many commenters pointed out that De la Madrid himself, as Secretary of Programming and the Budget and as the author of the "Global Development Plan" in 1980 – which had not anticipated a fall in the oil prices and whose mechanisms turned out to be insufficient to deal with the subsequent disaster – was to some extent responsible for the economic crisis.

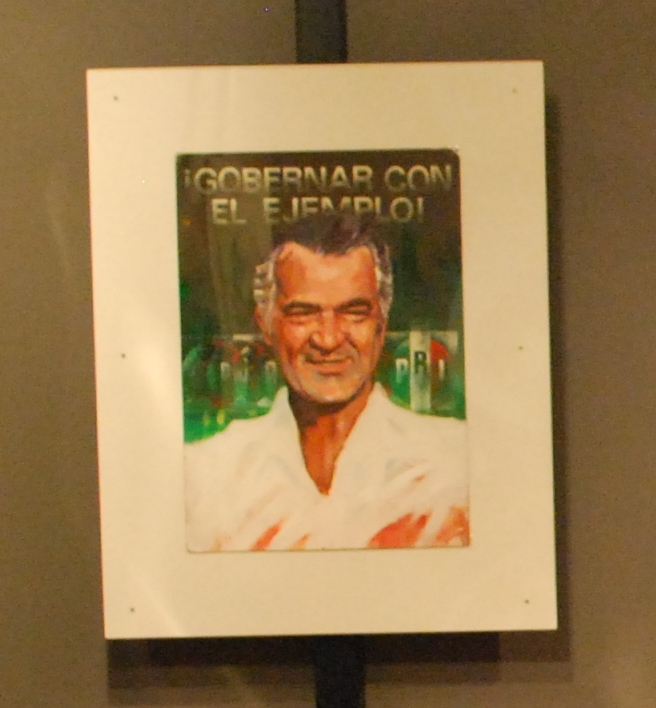
A poster from the De la Madrid campaign

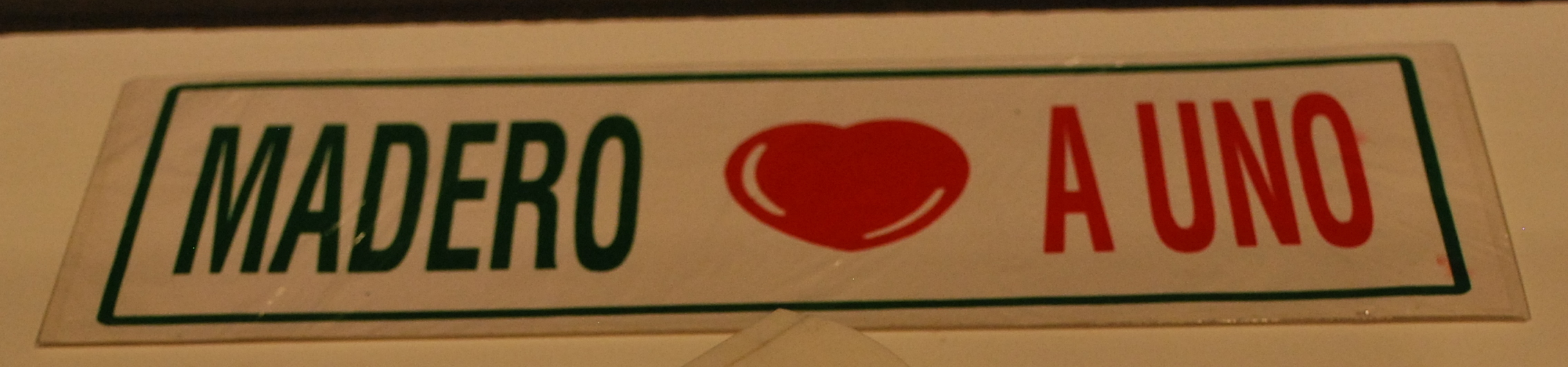
A sticker from the Pablo Emilio Madero (PAN) campaign

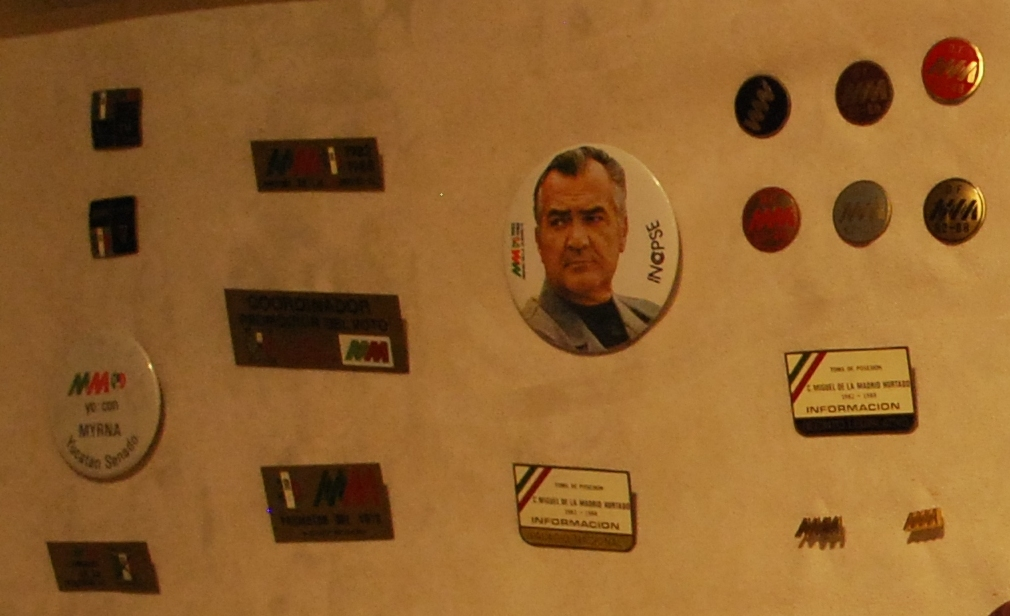
Buttons from the De la Madrid campaign

The PRI was criticized for the high cost of the official campaign in spite of the nation's critical financial situation. In defense, De la Madrid stated that "We could have saved lots of money focusing the campaign on TV and radio, but the Mexican idiosyncrasy demands that the people meet their candidate and have the opportunity to convey their problems to him" and that he preferred "the cost of political campaigns to the cost of the repression that dictatorial regimes carry with them". De la Madrid made an extensive tour of the national territory, as was the tradition for priísta presidential candidates; journalist Isabel Arvide, who was sent by El Sol de México to cover the campaign, stated that De la Madrid toured more than 114 000 kilometers on his campaign.

On 19 June the Unified Socialist Party of Mexico (PSUM) carried out the closing campaign rally of its presidential candidate, Arnoldo Martínez Verdugo, at the Zócalo in Mexico City. The event was of particular importance, both for it being the first opposition demonstration to be held at the Zócalo in 14 years (since the student protests and the subsequent Tlatelolco Massacre in 1968, the government had barred opposition organizations from using the compound), and for the relatively big assistance that it had, with many thousands of PSUM sympathizers joining that day. The event was remembered by the press as the "Red Zócalo".

In spite of the worsening economic crisis and the corruption scandals of the López Portillo administration, the PRI held a lead in opinion polls and, as it had always happened since it took power in 1929, its candidate was the eventual winner of the election by a large margin, as the opposition remained divided and none of its candidates had enough political strength to effectively challenge De la Madrid and the massive political apparatus of the PRI. De la Madrid's aforementioned proposal of "Moral renovation of the society" was also credited as a reason for his decisive victory, as voters hoped that the austere, reserved candidate would indeed make a serious effort to finally curb corruption in Mexico. In addition, De la Madrid was able to distance himself from López Portillo and to project himself as a serious, hard-working technocrat who was the "perfect antidote" for the social and economic disaster left by his predecessor.

== Results ==
=== President ===
Candidate	Party	Votes	%
Miguel de la Madrid	PRI–PARM–PPS	16,748,006	74.31
Pablo Emilio Madero	National Action Party	3,700,045	16.42
Arnoldo Martínez Verdugo	Unified Socialist Party of Mexico	821,995	3.65
Ignacio González Gollaz	Mexican Democratic Party	433,886	1.93
Rosario Ibarra	Workers' Revolutionary Party	416,448	1.85
Cándido Díaz Cerecedo	Workers' Socialist Party	342,005	1.52
Manuel Moreno Sánchez	Social Democratic Party	48,413	0.21
Non-registered candidates		28,474	0.13
Total		22,539,272	100.00
Valid votes		22,539,272	95.53
Invalid/blank votes		1,053,616	4.47
Total votes		23,592,888	100.00
Registered voters/turnout		31,526,386	74.84
Source: Nohlen

==== By state ====
The results by state were validated by the Chamber of Deputies in the same session as the national-level results, despite several differences.

State	De la Madrid (PRI + PARM + PPS)		Madero (PAN)		Martínez Verdugo (PSUM)		González Gollaz (PDM)		Ibarra (PRT)		Díaz Cerecedo (PST)		Moreno Sánchez (PSD)		Unregistered candidates		Null votes		Total
State	Votes	%	Votes	%	Votes	%	Votes	%	Votes	%	Votes	%	Votes	%	Votes	%	Votes	%	Total
Aguascalientes	139,796	70.24%	31,570	15.86%	1,879	0.94%	3,122	1.56%	1,300	0.65%	4,009	2.01%	345	0.17%	33	0.01%	16,967	8.52%	199,021
Baja California	287,673	53.92%	147,092	27.57%	16,456	3.08%	6,298	1.18%	12,403	2.32%	11,047	2.07%	1,149	0.21%	346	0.06%	50,996	9.55%	533,460
Baja California Sur	66,048	72.78%	13,852	15.26%	2,336	2.57%	537	0.59%	3,444	3.79%	763	0.84%	124	0.13%	23	0.02%	3,617	3.98%	90,744
Campeche	104,416	84.05%	8,052	6.48%	898	0.72%	401	0.32%	333	0.27%	419	0.34%	52	0.04%	29	0.02%	9,631	7.75%	124,231
Chiapas	691,983	91.88%	21,043	2.79%	7,745	1.02%	1,436	0.19%	4,958	0.65%	8,848	1.17%	1,109	0.14%	762	0.10%	15206	2.01%	753,090
Chihuahua	372,284	62.02%	153,704	25.61%	13,157	2.19%	4,719	0.79%	2,813	0.47%	5,169	0.86%	740	0.12%	67	0.01%	47,626	7.93%	600,279
Coahuila	228,687	68.27%	86,155	25.72%	4,770	1.42%	996	0.30%	2,334	0.70%	6,581	1.96%	351	0.10%	292	0.09%	4,806	1.43%	334,972
Colima	137,371	89.20%	7,126	4.63%	1,331	0.86%	2,009	1.30%	737	0.48%	1,788	1.16%	82	0.05%	19	0.01%	3,534	2.29%	153,997
Durango	288,810	76.50%	67,159	17.79%	7,619	2.02%	2,732	0.72%	280	0.07%	2,453	0.65%	413	0.11%	12	0.003%	14,926	2.89%	517,341
Federal District	1,977,179	51.79%	892,214	23.37%	286,661	7.51%	90,003	2.36%	199,963	5.24%	81,817	2.14%	18,702	0.49%	10,779	0.28%	260,092	6.81%	3,817,410
Guanajuato	592,644	66.65%	178,468	20.07%	10,755	1.21%	61,125	6.87%	3,063	0.34%	12,214	1.37%	1,154	0.13%	76	0.01%	29,716	3.34%	889,215
Guerrero	430,840	83.28%	22,392	4.33%	20,798	4.02%	5,667	1.10%	6,524	1.26%	15,583	3.01%	594	0.11%	17	0.003%	14,926	2.89%	517,341
Hidalgo	499,123	86.45%	50,641	8.77%	8,876	1.54%	2,998	0.52%	4,806	0.83%	10,289	1.78%	537	0.09%	0	0%	107	0.02%	577,377
Jalisco	840,804	58.52%	359,328	25.01%	89,946	6.26%	49,284	3.43%	6,691	0.47%	12,122	0.84%	2,248	0.16%	112	0.01%	76,308	5.31%	1,436,843
Michoacán	611,252	76.79%	90,201	11.33%	16,774	2.11%	34,978	4.39%	5,106	0.64%	7,524	0.95%	723	0.09%	87	0.01%	29,380	3.69%	796,025
State of Mexico	1,553,624	57.83%	606,668	22.58%	137,571	5.12%	67,423	2.51%	91,453	3.40%	40,497	1.51%	7,643	0.28%	851	0.03%	180,793	6.73%	2,686,523
Morelos	256,063	75.86%	33,673	9.98%	8,587	2.54%	4,754	1.41%	15,142	4.49%	6,514	1.93%	644	0.19%	44	0.01%	12,116	3.59%	337,537
Nayarit	161,561	78.77%	6,833	3.33%	22,577	11.01%	2,013	0.98%	708	0.35%	1,106	0.54%	160	0.08%	48	0.02%	10,103	4.93%	205,109
Nuevo León	642,648	72.96%	213,606	24.25%	4,494	0.51%	2,984	0.34%	3,973	0.45%	3,615	0.41%	853	0.10%	39	0.004%	8,653	0.98%	880,865
Oaxaca	676,410	88.20%	46,185	6.02%	20,908	2.73%	2,296	0.30%	4,948	0.65%	4,467	0.58%	580	0.08%	58	0.01%	11,057	1.44%	766,909
Puebla	1,109,871	78.23%	135,615	9.56%	25,668	1.81%	8,455	0.60%	9,575	0.67%	8,802	0.62%	1,209	0.09%	126	0.01%	119,393	8.42%	1,418,714
Querétaro	200,118	76.08%	40,518	15.40%	3,439	1.31%	4,543	1.73%	1,267	0.48%	1,429	0.54%	467	0.18%	18	0.01%	11,222	4.27%	263,021
Quintana Roo	89,361	92.52%	3,513	3.64%	896	0.93%	247	0.26%	302	0.31%	845	0.87%	65	0.07%	15	0.02%	1,343	1.39%	96,587
San Luis Potosí	415,999	83.22%	41,171	8.24%	3,907	0.78%	21,209	4.24%	2,389	0.48%	4,149	0.83%	710	0.14%	49	0.01%	10,321	2.06%	499,904
Sinaloa	489,280	79.57%	65,035	10.58%	31,947	5.20%	2,713	0.44%	5,374	0.87%	4,596	0.75%	827	0.13%	48	0.01%	15,112	2.46%	614,932
Sonora	426,648	74.79%	113,166	19.84%	6,759	1.18%	1,688	0.30%	4,759	0.83%	1,215	0.21%	742	0.13%	152	0.03%	15,335	2.69%	570,464
Tabasco	315,340	93.00%	11,706	3.45%	2,129	0.63%	645	0.19%	1,045	0.31%	2,921	0.86%	207	0.06%	9	0.003%	5,080	1.50%	339,082
Tamaulipas	514,472	83.00%	60,663	9.79%	8,219	1.33%	6,293	1.02%	3,311	0.53%	3,917	0.63%	958	0.15%	53	0.01%	21,960	3.54%	619,846
Tlaxcala	190,754	81.38%	21,890	9.34%	3,897	1.66%	10,035	4.28%	1,048	0.45%	836	0.36%	139	0.06%	35	0.01%	5,758	2.46%	234,392
Veracruz	1,787,317	85.89%	69,622	3.35%	43,769	2.10%	29,187	1.40%	14,017	0.67%	73,672	3.54%	4,569	0.22%	14,246	0.68%	44,492	2.14%	2,080,891
Yucatán	271,844	81.21%	59,275	17.71%	322	0.10%	389	0.12%	947	0.28%	411	0.12%	141	0.04%	4	0.001%	1,395	0.42%	334,728
Zacatecas	350,986	85.15%	39,859	9.67%	6,903	1.67%	2,707	0.66%	1,435	0.35%	1,587	0.39%	176	0.04%	25	0.01%	8,518	2.07%	412,196
Total	16,721,206	70.96%	3,697,995	15.69%	821,993	3.49%	433,886	1.84%	416,448	1.77%	341,205	1.45%	48,413	0.21%	28,474	0.12%	1,053,616	4.47%	23,563,236
Source: CEDE, taken from the 9 September 1982 session of the Mexican Chamber of Deputies

=== Senate ===
Party	Votes	%	Seats	+/–
Institutional Revolutionary Party	14,574,114	70.60	64	+1
National Action Party	3,678,096	17.82	0	0
Unified Socialist Party of Mexico	866,301	4.20	0	New
Mexican Democratic Party	438,471	2.12	0	New
Popular Socialist Party	375,059	1.82	0	-1
Workers' Socialist Party	320,672	1.55	0	New
Workers' Revolutionary Party	221,421	1.07	0	New
Authentic Party of the Mexican Revolution	153,495	0.74	0	New
Social Democratic Party	2,966	0.01	0	New
Non-registered candidates	11,539	0.06	0	0
Total	20,642,134	100.00	64	0
Valid votes	20,642,134	92.06		
Invalid/blank votes	1,780,333	7.94		
Total votes	22,422,467	100.00		
Registered voters/turnout	31,520,884	71.14		
Source: Nohlen, Gómez Tagle

=== Chamber of Deputies ===
Party	Party-list			Constituency			Total seats	+/–
Party	Votes	%	Seats	Votes	%	Seats	Total seats	+/–
Institutional Revolutionary Party	14,289,793	65.71	0	14,501,988	69.36	299	299	+3
National Action Party (Note: The PAN recorded the sole opposition electoral district victory, in the State of Mexico's 18th.)	3,786,348	17.41	50	3,663,846	17.52	1	51	+8
Unified Socialist Party of Mexico	932,214	4.29	17	914,365	4.37	0	17	New
Mexican Democratic Party	534,122	2.46	12	475,099	2.27	0	12	+2
Popular Socialist Party	459,303	2.11	10	395,006	1.89	0	10	–1
Workers' Socialist Party	428,153	1.97	11	372,679	1.78	0	11	+1
Workers' Revolutionary Party	308,099	1.42	0	264,632	1.27	0	0	New
Authentic Party of the Mexican Revolution	282,004	1.30	0	282,971	1.35	0	0	–12
Social Democratic Party	53,306	0.25	0	38,994	0.19	0	0	New
Non-registered candidates	671,999	3.09	0	108	0.00	–	0	0
Total	21,745,341	100.00	100	20,909,688	100.00	300	400	0
Valid votes	21,745,341	95.10		20,909,688	99.95			
Invalid/blank votes	1,121,378	4.90		10,192	0.05			
Total votes	22,866,719	100.00		20,919,880	100.00			
Registered voters/turnout	31,516,370	72.56		31,520,884	66.37			
Source: Nohlen, Bailey

== Aftermath ==
The increase in voter turnout, which was of 74.82% according to official figures, was widely celebrated by the government as an advance against abstentionism. In spite of it and of the positive result for the PRI, the economic condition continued to deteriorate. In August, the country declared a moratorium on its foreign debt and the peso suffered another devaluation, remaining at an exchange rate of around 70 per US dollar. Towards the end of the year it had further fallen to 149 per dollar, which meant that the accumulated devaluation in 1982 was of 470%.

The discredit of López Portillo near the end of his presidency, amid the severe economic crisis and the monumental corruption scandals which involved members of his government and his family, had no precedent in the recent memory of the nation.

The situation was such that on 1 September 1982, during his final State of the Nation report to Congress, President López Portillo asked for forgiveness from the nation's poor for having failed to improve their condition, as he shed some tears. In the same Address to the Congress, López Portillo decreed the nationalization of the banks and a generalized exchange control. These measures, taken only three months before his term was set to end, caused serious differences between López Portillo and President-elect De la Madrid, who had expressed his complete disagreement with the measures and would later write that "it implied a severe lack of respect for me and a suspicion that the President intended to condition my government". The relationship between the two became more distant in the following months, as De la Madrid perceived that López Portillo, through his son José Ramón, was trying to exercise too much power for an outgoing President and that he was trying to overshadow the President-elect.

The National Action Party (PAN), which had nominated Pablo Emilio Madero as its presidential candidate, claimed that there had been many irregularities in the election, such as an unrestricted use of public resources in favor of the PRI candidates, emptying of electoral rolls, stuffing of ballot boxes, and that many ballots with votes for Madero and other opposition candidates had been thrown into the garbage by PRI officials; while they didn't go so far as to dispute that De la Madrid had indeed won, the PAN argued that the margin of victory of the PRI candidate had been artificially inflated and that Madero had obtained at least 4 million votes. With these arguments, in the 9 September session of the Chamber of Deputies, the PAN voted against the ruling which officially declared De la Madrid as president-elect.
