= Efraín Huerta =

Mexican poet (1914–1982)

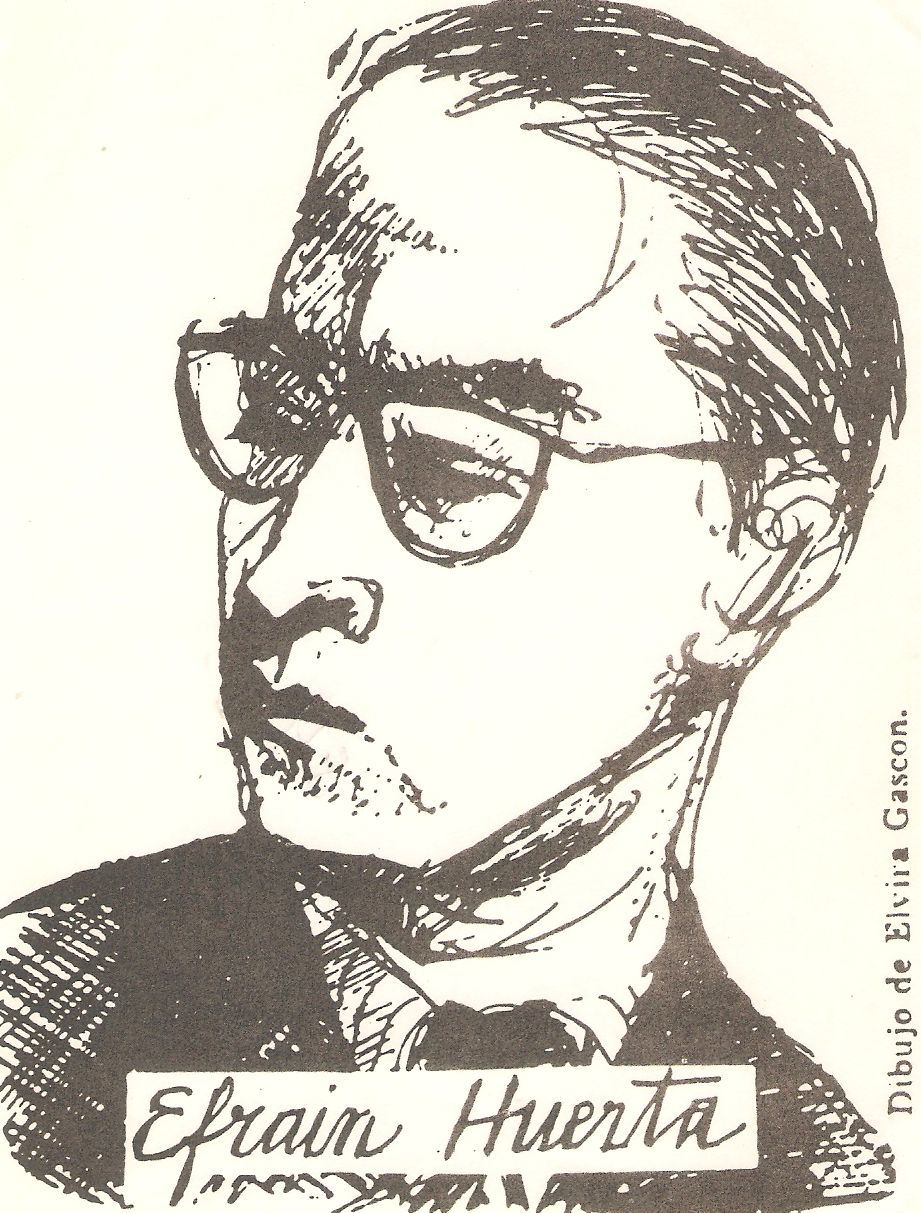
- Born: Efrén Huerta Roma; June 18, 1914; Silao, Guanajuato
- Died: February 3, 1982 (aged 67); Mexico City, Mexico
- Resting place: Xochitepec, Morelos
- Education: National Preparatory School; National Autonomous University of Mexico (2 years)
- Occupations: Poet and journalist
- Spouses: Mireya Bravo Munguía; Thelma Nava
- Children: David Huerta
- Writing career
- Language: Spanish
- Years active: 1936-1982
- Notable awards: Ordre des Palmes académiques; Xavier Villarrutia Award; National Prize for Arts

Efraín Huerta Roma (June 18, 1914 – February 3, 1982) was a Mexican poet and journalist. Born and raised in the state of Guanajuato, he moved to Mexico City initially to start a career in art. Unable to enter the Academy of San Carlos, he attended the Escuela Preparatoria Nacional, where he met writers such as Rafael Solana, Carmen Toscano and Octavio Paz. He had been writing poetry since he was young, but initially opted to attend law school; however, when he published his first book of poems, he left it to pursue writing full-time. As a poet, he published regularly from the 1930s to the 1980s, and as a journalist collaborated with over twenty newspapers and journals, under his own name and using pseudonyms. He was also active politically, a communist and Stalin supporter through his life with his social and political ideas finding their way into his writing. Poetically, he is part of the Taller generation of Mexican poets, although his development was a bit different from others in this group. Near the end of his career, his work had developed a colloquial style, including work focusing on Mexico City and creating a new form called a “poemínimo.”

== Life ==
Efraín Huerta was born Efrén Huerta Roma in Silao, Guanajuato, Mexico, in 1914, during the Mexican Revolution which would have a profound impact on his life and Mexico in the 20th century. He was the seventh of eight children born to José Mercedes Huerta, a lawyer and judge and Sara Roma, with two of his siblings dying in childhood.

The family moved to Irapuato in 1917, where the parents separated, with Huerta moving with his mother and siblings to León, and later in 1925 to Querétaro. Huerta's father remained in Irapuato where the poet visited him on occasion as a teenager. Huerta began primary school late in León, and went on to middle school in Querétaro, attending the Colegio Civil del Estado and later the Academia de Bellas Artes. In his youth he held various types of jobs including drawing advertising posters. In his free time, he was a passionate soccer player, and later in his life would become a fan of the Mexico City Atlante team, never missing a home game.

Huerta's interest in drawing prompted him to move to Mexico City at age 16 and live with family members while he tried to get into the Academy of San Carlos, but was not accepted. Nonetheless, Huerta would remain in this city for the rest of his life, living in various neighborhoods in the center and west such as Tabacalera, El Periodista, historic center and Polanco.

Instead, Huerta entered the National Preparatory School in 1931, studying under Julio Torri and Agustín Loera y Chávez and forming friendships with Rafael Solana and Carmen Toscano. Huerta also met Octavio Paz at the institution, who was one year ahead of him. Paz and Huerta formed a close relationship in their youth, sharing social, literary and political interests. However, in later life, these two would become distant as their political views diverged.

Huerta entered the law school of the National Autonomous University of Mexico in 1933, but stayed for only two years. At this time, he changed his name to Efraín, at the suggestion of Rafael Solana, with the idea that it sounded better. For a short time he also used the Hebrew version Ephraím. During his time in law school, Huerta had continued to write poetry, and when the book Absoluto amor (which he dedicated to Adela María Salinas) was published in 1935, he left to dedicate himself to writing.

In 1941, Huerta married his first wife, Mireya Bravo Munguía, who he had known for a decade prior, with Octavio Paz as best man. She appears in his poetry as “Andrea de Plata. The couple had three children Andrea Huerta Bravo (1943), Eugenia Huerta Bravo (1945) and David Huerta Bravo (1949-2022). Much of his day-to-day life during this period revolved about the historic center of Mexico City, especially the area around the Monument to the Revolution and the main street called San Juan de Letrán (today Eje Central). Late nights he was a regular customer at Sidralí, a hot dog and cider establishment, a favorite among journalists, and every Sunday was spent at the Ciudad de los Deportes to watch a bullfight or a match involving the Atlante team. He was an involved father, especially with his two daughters, taking them to the movies, to the Zaplana bookstore, Super Leche (known for its hamburgers and bottles of milk) and El Moro for churros and hot chocolate, all along San Juan de Letran. However, according to one of these daughters, he was not faithful to their mother. His son David would grow up to also be a poet and critic, but in a style very different from his father’s.

Huerta married for the second time in 1958 with poet and fellow radical Thelma Nava. With her he had two more daughters Thelma Huerta Nava (1959) and Raquel Huerta Nava (1963). With these two he traveled to Morelia, Guanajuato and Querétaro, along with small towns, often looking for Mexican handcrafts. With this family, he lived in Polanco, where he wandering would take him to nearby cafes and restaurants.

The origin of Huerta’s nickname El Cocodrilismo “The Crocodilism” is in late 1949, during funding drive for a school in San Felipe Torresmochas, Guanajuato. Here Huerta told crocodile stories, saying that we all have a crocodile in us. In 1973, Huerta was diagnosed with cancer of the larynx, and had the organ removed. Although he survived the cancer, it left him mostly voiceless, recuperating some of his ability to speak with the help of speech therapy.

Efraín Huerta died almost ten years later in Mexico City at the age of 67 due to kidney failure after battling a return of cancer. He is buried in Xochitepec.

== Poetry ==
=== Publications ===
Huerta is best known for his poetry, which he began writing as a student. His first publication was a poem called El Bajío, appearing in a local paper called La Lucha, followed by Tarde provinciana. His first book was Absoluto amor (Absolute love), published in 1935, but very few copies remain. This success convinced Huerta to dedicate himself full-time to poetry, politics and journalism. Huerta's first important publication is Los hombres del alba (Men of the dawn), published in 1944, and is considered a classic of 20th century Mexican poetry. In this volume his first works using Mexico City as a subject appears. It was followed by Línea del alba in 1946, with similar themes, a compilation of poems previously published in magazines such as Taller.

In 1950 he published a small volume with six poems called La rosa primitiva, but it was virtually ignored by critics at the time. Another important work is El Tajín (1953), named after the archeological site in northern Veracruz. In 1956, he published Los poemas de viaje, works inspired by his travels to the United States, the Soviet Union and Eastern Europe and his observation of social and political issues. It also contains poems about his new son, David, written while he was in Czechoslovakia. In the same year, he published Estella en alto, a mix of love poems with those with political topics.

His later works include Poemas prohibidos y de amor (1973), Transa poética (1980), an anthology of previously published and unpublished work, Estampida de poemínimos (1981), and Amor patria mía (1981).

=== Style ===
Influences on Huerta's work include works by Juan Ramón Jiménez, the Generation of ’27, the Contemporáneos and those by Pablo Neruda. He is part of the Taller generation in Mexico, along with Octavio Paz, Rafael Solana, Salvador Toscano and others, which rejected lyricism subjectively and aesthetically, opting instead to promote an idea of universal solidarity. This generation was also known for its political and poetic militancy. His work continues the Whitmanian tradition of rebellious non-conformity and vitality, but he eliminates Whitman’s base idealism and employs anti-rhetorical lyricism.

His years at law school influenced the logic and diction of his work, especially his early work, although over time, Huerta would abandon the formats of his youth entirely. Huerta differed from others in his generation in that instead of moving towards romanticism and symbolism, his poetry evolved towards the use of analogy, colloquial realism (influence from José Emilio Pacheco) and less academic, more colloquial style, an “anti-poem.” His work has been described as “…bringing a loose-jointed exuberance into Mexican poetry.”

Several themes are recurrent in Huerta's work. One of these is the concept of dawn (alba), with the idea of faint light bringing clarity. Political and social themes are another, marked both by his militancy and the occurrence of major wars and other conflicts which occurred during his lifetime. Two examples of these are Poemas de guerra y esperanza (1943) and Los hombres del alba(1944), related to the Spanish Civil War and World War II respectively. He generally condemned imperialism and capitalism in favor of socialism and supported the Soviet regime, especially with the poems Stalingrado en pie (1942) and Canto a la paz soviética (1947). The last important theme is that of Mexico City, especially in his later work. In his verses, the Mexican capital becomes a collective which he aims to portray.

In Huerta's last phase of production, from 1969 to his death, he develops a new format of poetry called poemínimo, short playful verses, where he explored topics with humor, irony and cynicism. These first appear in 1969 in a magazine called Comunidad and in the supplement La Cultura en México, then in books such as Poemas prohibidos y de amor (1973), Los eróticos (1974), Circuito interior (1977), culminating in 50 poemínimos (1978).

== Journalism and other literary activities ==
Huerta began his journalism career in 1936, and during the following decades collaborated with over twenty newspapers and journals, with some exceptions, all in Mexico City. He began with El Nacional and then the weekly El Figaro, focusing on theater and film criticism, something he would continue throughout his career with the addition of investigative reports. Other publications include Nosotros and Cinema Reporter, with many columns published under pseudonyms. At least a dozen are confirmed to be Huerta and include Filmito Rueda, Fósforo, El Periquillo, El Hombre de la Esquina, Juan Ruiz, Damocles, Juanito Pegafuerte.

In 1936, Huerta was one of the founders of the Taller Poético, a poetry magazine from had its first run from 1936 to 1938. Rafael was originally the director but in 1938, Octavio Paz took over, shorting the name to Taller and expanding the format to include short stories, essays, critiques and other article. This revamped magazine ran until 1940. His association with Taller was formative for Huerta and others in part because Paz brought in the work of Spanish writers as well. However, there was a falling out between Paz and Huerta, and Huerta left suddenly for unknown reasons. In 1947, Huerta established the weekly magazine El Figaro, and was its first director. That same year he began collaborating with the Close up de nuestro cine section of the Revista Mexicana de Cultura, part of El Nacional, writing about Mexican popular cinema of the time. Later these writings were republished in two books called Close up I and Close up II (2010) .

In 1951 he became director of the Intercambio cultural magazine, of the Mexican-Russian Exchange Institute.

Huerta's crocodile stories, initially done verbally, became the inspiration for the creation of a work called the Manifesto of the Crocodile, an optimistic idea in opposition to existentialism. From 1957 to 1961, he edited a literary magazine called Cuadernos del Cocodrilo (Notebooks of the Crocodile), doing the illustrations. They were not published until much later, and when they were, they became popular with children.

In 1970, he was president of the Cinema Journalists of Mexico.

== Political activities ==
Huerta's political activities began early, joining the Great Socialist Party of Central Querétaro in 1929. He then joined the Federation of Revolutionary Students in 1936, where he met José Revueltas, officially joining the Mexican Communist Party in 1936. In 1934, Huerta and Paz fought against José Revueltas' incarceration for “antisocial activities”, and later were vocal together about the Spanish Civil War. His time in the Communist Party was his most militant, but it was short-lived because in the 1940s, the Party went into crisis, with membership divided into those who supported Trotsky vs. those in support of Stalin. One fallout from this was the expulsion of Efraín Huerta along with a number of other artists and intellectuals. Huerta remained communist and a Stalin loyalist through the rest of his life, despite being aware of the atrocities of the regime.

Huerta's political activities included writing poetry and travel. In 1951, he was named the secretary general of the Consejo Nacional de Partidarios de la Paz. Under this charge he traveled to the Soviet Union, Czechoslovakia and Hungary. After the Cuban Revolution, he traveled to Cuba twice, in 1967 and 1968, in support of the new regime. This also had consequences. He was denied a US visa in 1966 for being a member of a communist sympathizing organization. In 1978 his work was censored in Brazil, and his support for the Sandinistas in Nicaragua resulted in his ban from the country, under penalty of death.

One event about which he was relatively silent was the student uprising in Tlatelolco in 1968, although he had strong opinions about it and about the Mexico president at the time, Gustavo Díaz Ordaz. According to his daughter Raquel Huerta Nava, it was because it pained him too much and because some of his children were involved.

== Recognition ==
In the late 1940s, Huerta was awarded the Ordre des Palmes académiques by the French government for his work as a writer and journalist. In 1956 he received the Stalin Peace Prize. Diego Rivera included an image of the poet in the mural Pesadilla de guerra y sueño de paz (1952), which has since disappeared, with its whereabouts unknown.

In the 1970s, Huerta received a number of awards in Mexico for his life's work including the Xavier Villarrutia Award (1975), the National Prize for Arts (1976) and the National Journalism Prize (1978) .

After his death, his library and personal archives were acquired by the government and placed at the home of poet Ramón López Velarde and in the library of Salvador Novo to provide public and research access, and in 1988 the Fondo de Cultura Económica published the first edition of Poesía completo.

Interest in Huerta's work waned after his death but has resurged in the 2010s, becoming one of the most-read poets by the generations after him in Mexico. His work has been republished in volumes such as Aurora roja (crónicas juveniles en tiempos de Lázaro Cárdenas, 1936-1939) (2007, a collection of one hundred pieces by Huerta as poet and journalist between 1936 and 1939) and El Gran Cocodrilo en treinta poemínimos. (2014) .

The 100th anniversary of the poet's birth was celebrated in Mexico in 2014 with tributes at the Mexican Senate, the Festival Internacional Cervantino and the Feria Internacional del Libro in Guadalajara.

== Works ==
- 1935 - Absoluto amor
- 1936 - Línea del alba
- 1944 - Los hombres del alba
- 1943 - Poemas de guerra y esperanza
- 1950 - La rosa primitiva
- 1951 - Poesía
- 1953 - Poemas de viaje
- 1956 - Estrella en alto y nuevos poemas
- 1957 - Para gozar tu paz
- 1959 - ¡Mi país, oh mi país!
- 1959 - Elegía de la policía montada
- 1961 - Farsa trágica del presidente que quería una isla
- 1962 - La raíz amarga
- 1963 - El Tajín
- 1973 - Poemas prohibidos y de amor
- 1974 - Los eróticos y otros poemas
- 1980 - Estampida de poemínimos
- 1980 - Tranza poética
- 1985 - Estampida de Poemínimos
