= Social Democratic Party (Mexico, 1980) =

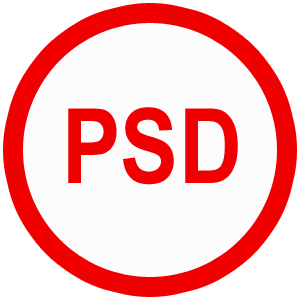
- Abbreviation: PSD
- Founder: Manuel Moreno Sánchez
- Founded: Late 1970s
- Registered: 14 December 1980; 44 years ago
- Dissolved: 1982
- Headquarters: Mexico City
- Ideology: Social democracy Liberalism; Secularism; Revolutionary nationalism New left
- Political position: Centre-left to left-wing

The Social Democratic Party (Spanish: Partido Social Demócrata, PSD) was a political party in Mexico during the late 1970s to 1982 with a moderate leftist tendency. It was founded by Manuel Moreno Sánchez, a former member of the Institutional Revolutionary Party (PRI).

Advocating revolutionary nationalism and a new left stance and founded thanks to political reforms implemented by José López Portillo y Pacheco, the party was registered on 14 December 1980. It eventually participated in the 1982 elections, in which it nominated Moreno as its presidential candidate. He received 48,412 votes (0.21%): less than the 2% of the vote required to retain party registration, with which the party was dissolved and disappeared.

== Election results ==
=== Presidential elections ===
Election year	Candidate	# votes	% vote	Result	Note
1982	Manuel Moreno Sánchez	48,413	0.21	✗ Defeated	
