= Thelma Nava =

Mexican poet and journalist (1932–2019)

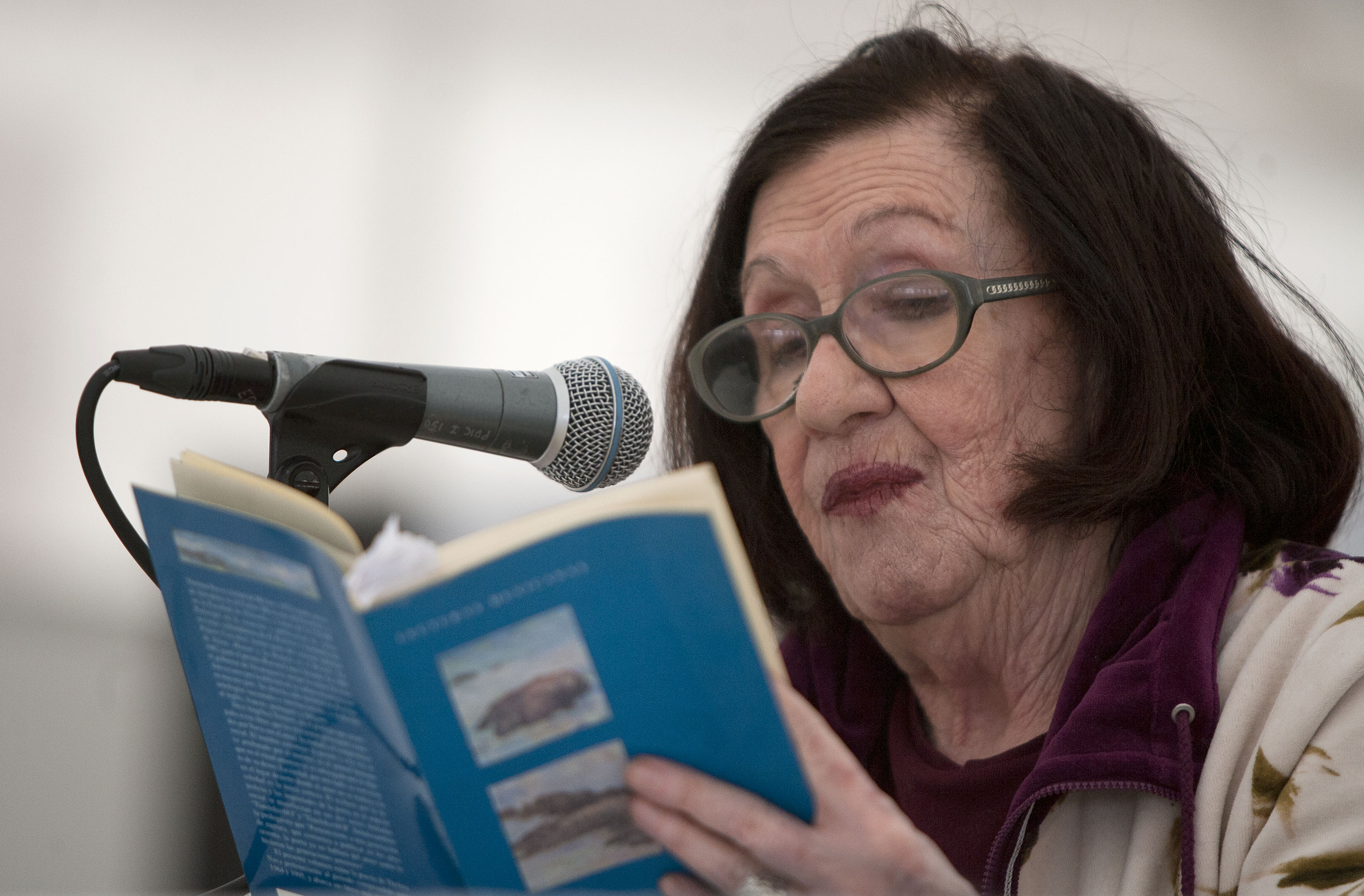
Thelma Nava, 2013

Thelma Nava (November 25, 1932 - August 17, 2019) was a Mexican poet and journalist. She founded and co-founded magazines, one of which she also published. Nava was the recipient of the Premio Nacional de Poesía «Ramón López Velarde» and the Presea Rosario Castellanos.

== Biography ==
Thelma Nava was born in Mexico City, November 25, 1932. She studied at the Casa del Lago Juan José Arreola; at the Faculty of Philosophy and Letters of the National Autonomous University of Mexico (UNAM); and at the Centro Mexicano de Escritores ("Mexican Center of Writers") where she wrote her first work, Aquí te guardo yo ("Here I keep you").

Nava was co-founder of the magazine El Rehilete y, with Luis Mario Schneider and Armando Zárate. She founded the magazine Pájaro Cascabel (1962–1968) and served as its publisher. She participated in the collective management of the magazines Xilote (1969–1977) and Manatí (1974–1984) as well as La Brújula en el Bolsillo. With Sergio Mondragón and Margaret Randall, editors of the magazine El Corno Emplumado, she co-organized the First Inter-American Meeting of Poets, which was held in 1964 at the Club de Periodistas de México. During the period of 1964–65, she associated with the newspaper El Día, as a cultural journalist, taking charge of the "Showcase" section. She conducted interviews, poetry selections, and critical notes on poetry and theater. She also reviewed books and cultural magazines.

From 1980 till 1982, with the writers Juan de la Cabada, Eraclio Zepeda, and Saúl Ibargoyen, she joined the "Brigada Cultural Roque Dalton". In 1984, and for the next two years, she participated in the Acción cultural del ISSSTE program with a group of 36 poets who gave poetry talks in all Mexican states. Nava participated in cultural promotion activities for teachers at the National Pedagogical University, 1996–97.

At Películas Nacionale ("National Movies"), she met the poet Efraín Huerta whom she married in 1958. They had two daughters, Thelma and Raquel, and two granddaughters, daughters of Thelma: Varenka and Natalia. She died in Castlegar, British Columbia, Canada, August 17, 2019.

== Awards and honors ==
- Premio Nacional de Poesía «Ramón López Velarde» (1962)
- Recognition of the Aguadillano Cultural Center, Institute of Puerto Rican Culture. November 20, 1966.
- Presea Rosario Castellanos (1993)
- Tribute of the H. Constitutional City Council of Chalco, State of Mexico, at the 4th National Meeting of Poets. April 19, 2001.
- Tribute "for his outstanding work and tireless career". Cuacthemoc delegation. General Directorate of Social Development. March 8, 2002.
- Recognition of the Cultural Group "Poets in Construction, AC". Cd. Nezahualcótyol. August 17, 2002.
- IV Nezahualcóyotl Award, awarded by Ciudad Nezahualcóyotl, June 2005.

== Selected works ==
- Aquí te guardo yo (1957)
- La orfandad del sueño (1964)
- Poèmes Choisis . Niza, Francia, Profils Poètiques des Pays Latins, 1965.
- Colibrí 50 (1966)
- El primer animal (1986)
- El libro de los territorios (1992)
- Material de Lectura. Antología (1992)
- El verano y las islas (1998).
- Paisajes interiores (2000)
- El primer animal. Poesía reunida 1964-1995 (2000)
- Los pasos circulares (2003)
- Para volver al mar (2004)
