= Verónica Murguía =

Mexican fantasy writer (born 1960)

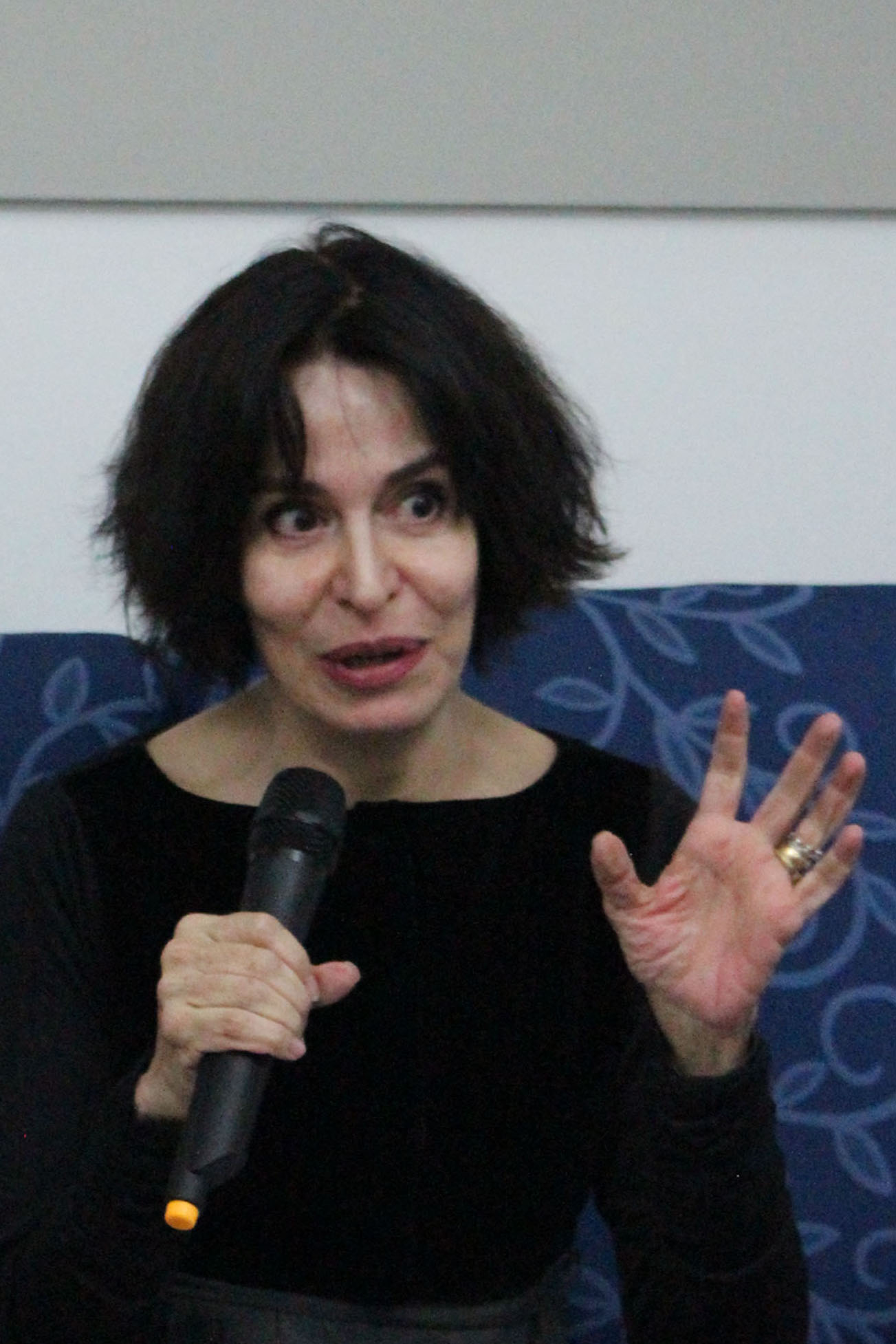
- Murguía in 2017
- Born: 5 November 1960 (age 65); Mexico City, Mexico
- Occupations: Writer, educator
- Years active: 1990–present
- Spouse: David Huerta

Verónica Murguía (born 1960) is a Mexican fantasy writer who has won multiple prizes for her children's literature and novels. Her husband was poet David Huerta.

== Biography ==
Verónica Murguía was born on 5 November 1960 in Mexico City, Mexico. She attended the Escuela Nacional de Artes Plásticas e Historia (National School of Visual arts and history). She studied history at the National Autonomous University of Mexico (UNAM) and then began working as an illustrator.

Her first publications in 1990 were a novel entitled "Rosendo" and "Historia y aventuras de Taté el mago y Clarisel la cuentera", which won the National Short Story Prize for Children Juan de la Cabada. In 1993 Murguía was a FONCA Fellow and studied and lived in Canada for a brief time.

In 1999, Murguía began writing a bi-weekly column for La Jornada's cultural supplement. In addition, she has published journalism pieces in Etcétera and Laberinto Urbano; hosted the educational radio program “Desde acá los chilangos”; participated in an educational program for indigenous children in Oaxaca, Sonora and Yucatán; and taught children's literature at the Mexican Writer's Guild (SOGEM). Since 2001, she has been a member of the National System of Art Creators.

In 2005, her book "Auliya" was named one of the books of the year by Banco del Libro of Venezuela and was nominated for the Rattenfänger Prize in Hameln, Germany, as well as being translated into German, Italian, and Portuguese. Her fantasy novel "Loba" was awarded the Gran Angular Prize in 2013 from Spain.

== Personal life ==
She was married to the writer David Huerta.

== Selected works ==
- Rosendo Mexico: Consejo Nacional para la Cultura y las Artes (1990) (in Spanish)
- Historia y aventuras de tate el mago y clarisel la cuentera México: Editorial Amaquemecan (1991) (in Spanish)
- David y el armadillo Mexico: CONAFE (1998) (in Spanish)
- El fuego verde Mexico: CONACULTA: Ediciones SM (1999) (in Spanish)
- Auliya Madrid: Acento Editoria (1999) (in Spanish)
- Auliya: eine magische Reise durch die Wüste Zürich: Nagel und Kimche (2001) (in German)
- Hotel Monstruo, ¡bienvenidos! México: Alfaguara (2002) (in Spanish)
- Día de muertos: serenidad ritual México: Artes de México y del Mundo (2002) (in Spanish)
- Simbad el marino Madrid: Ediciones SM (2003) (in Spanish)
- Alí Babá y los cuarenta ladrones Madrid: Ediciones SM (2003) (in Spanish)
- El pollo ramiro México: Santillana (2003) (in Spanish)
- Lo que sí y lo qui no México: Secretaría de Educación Pública (2005) (in Spanish)
- Nueve Patas Mexico: Editorial Progreso (2005) (in Spanish)
- Mi monstruo Mandarino México, D.F.: Artes de México: Consejo Nacional de Cultura y las Artes (2007) (in Spanish)
- Rituales México, D. F.: Artes de México: Secretaría de Cultura del Gobierno del Distrito Federal (2007) (in Spanish)
- Los niños voladores México, D. F.: Consejo Nacional para la Cultura y las Artes (2008) (in Spanish)
- Ladridos y conjuros México, D. F.: Ediciones SM (2008) (in Spanish)
- Loba Madrid: Boadilla del Monte: Ediciones SM (2013) (in Spanish)

== Prizes ==
In 2026, Murguía won the Gilberto Owen National Literary Prize, awarded by the Sinaloa Institute of Culture, for her collection of short fiction, Asfódelo.
