= Carmen Toscano =

Mexican documentarian, poet, preservationist, producer and actress

- Born: October 19, 1910; Mexico City, Distrito Federal, Mexico
- Died: January 14, 1988; Aguascalientes, Aguascalientes, Mexico
- Other names: Carmen Toscano Escobedo, Carmen Toscano de Moreno Sánchez
- Spouse: Manuel Moreno Sánchez

Carmen Toscano (October 19, 1910 – January 14, 1988) was a Mexican documentarian, poet, preservationist, producer, and actress. She is the daughter of Mexico's first filmmaker Salvador Toscano Barragán.

She is best known for her 1950 documentary Memorias de un mexicano, consisting of footage from her father's past films, which served as important milestone for the inclusion of Mexican culture in film, and was the first documentary film produced in Mexico. Over a career spanning nearly forty years, Toscano worked towards the conscious effort of preserving and emphasizing traditional Mexican culture to the rest of the world. Toscano is identified as someone who made substantive key contributions to the development of Mexican cinema.

== Early life ==
Carmen Toscano was born on October 19, 1910, to Carmen Christina Martez and Salvador Toscano Barragán in Mexico City, Distrito Federal, Mexico. At an early age, Toscano became interested in filmmaking, having been exposed to film screenings held by her father, Salvador Toscano Barragán. Barragán is recognized as Mexico's first filmmaker, often documenting local scenes and news events around Mexico City. He is also known for opening Mexico's first public cinema, which began exhibiting the work of Georges Méliès and Edwin Stanton Porter to Mexican audiences for the first time. Carmen Toscano gravitated toward the work of her father, and identified him as the most influential person in her life in her 1993 poem, Testimonio.

Toscano received her doctorate in literature from National Autonomous University of Mexico (UNAM).

== Career ==
=== Early career ===
During her early twenties, Toscano wrote and edited poems, short stories, essays, and plays of others. Over her career, she contributed to America, Universidad de Mexico, and Taller Poetico. With María del Carmen Millán, Toscano founded the literary journal Rueca, to generate more exposure for feminist Mexican authors. Rueca was discontinued in 1948, during which time Toscano began documenting her father's efforts to preserve Mexican culture.

=== Memorias de un mexicano ===
Toscano realized her father's goals to produce a film of the Mexican Revolution, (Note: One of Salvador Toscano Barragán’s main goals of his career was to produce a compilation film highlighting the complete history of the Mexican Revolution, the time period of Carmen’s childhood and adolescence. These efforts were put forth between the early 1910s to the mid 1930s. By 1937, an exhausted Salvador made one attempt to sell a reel of his raw footage to the Public Education Ministry. Carmen took over the effort, making two futile attempts to partly offload the archive; first in 1942 to Iris Barry of the New York Museum of Modern Art Film Library and then in 1945 to a British Museum. In 1946, she had a chance encounter with Paramount Pictures executive Chico Alonso, which led sell the archived materials to the film studio. By 1947, following her father’s death, Carmen had a majority of the 100,000 feet of film the archive consisted of – but the prospective deal with Paramount Pictures fell through.) when she worked with Cinematográfica Latinoamericana, S.A. Studios to construct the narrated Memorias de un mexicano film, which depicts of Mexican daily life documented by Salvador and others between the years 1897 to 1946. The fictional narrative, with voice-over by actor Manuel Bernal, revolves around the last fifteen-year reign of dictator Porfirio Díaz, the subsequent Mexican Revolution, and life in post-revolutionary Mexico. Memorias de un mexicano premiered in 1950 to critical acclaim, being praised for its objectivity and impartiality towards its subject matter. Toscano was also identified as a pioneer in the genre of documentary filmmaking, as well as one of the leaders of the Mexican preservationist movement.

=== Later career ===
She continued to preserve her father's archive and legacy. In 1959, Toscano's play, La llorna, was made into a film of the same name by René Cardona. In 1963, Toscano compiled historical film archives, now located at Cinemateca de México. By 1967, Memorias was officially declared a “historical monument” by the National Institute for Archaeology and History, according to Novedadas. In 1976, Toscano used some of the excess footage from the archive to create an additional film entitled Ronda revolucionara, which remains unreleased. She needed to stop her work on the film due to her health. Over her career, she worked on television.

== Personal life ==
Toscano was married to Manuel Moreno Sánchez, a lawyer, judge, professor, and politician with the Institutional Revolutionary Party (PRI) who later ran as an opposition candidate in the 1982 presidential election. They had daughter Alejandra, son Héctor, and daughter Carmen, a lawyer and ambassador. Alejandra was a secretary general of the Department of the Federal District; Héctor was a federal deputy. The children had the surname Moreno Toscano.

She died on January 14, 1988, in the city of Aguascalientes, Mexico. Sánchez established the Carmen Toscano Foundation in her honor as a means of further documenting and archiving natural footage of Mexico in an effort to preserve the culture.
