= Memories of a Mexican =

1950 film

- Directed by: Salvador Toscano; Carmen Toscano
- Starring: Manuel Bernal
- Narrated by: Manuel Bernal
- Release date: 24 August 1950
- Country: Mexico
- Language: Spanish

Memories of a Mexican (Spanish: Memorias de un Mexicano) is a 1950 Mexican documentary film directed by Salvador Toscano and Carmen Toscano. It was entered into the 1954 Cannes Film Festival. The film was preserved by the Academy Film Archive in 2012.
