= Arnoldo Martínez Verdugo =

Mexican politician (1925–2013)

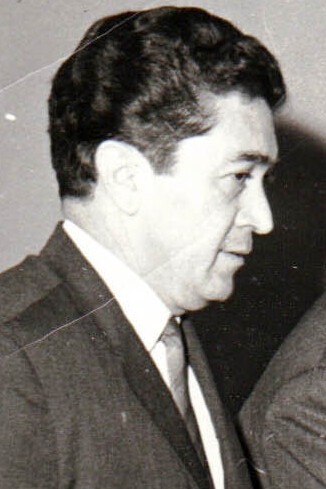
- Martínez Verdugo in 1971

General Secretary of the Mexican Communist Party
- In office 1963–1981

Personal details
- Born: January 12, 1925 Mocorito, Sinaloa, Mexico
- Died: May 24, 2013 (aged 88) Mexico City, Mexico
- Party: Party of the Democratic Revolution (PRD)
- Other political affiliations: Unified Socialist Party of Mexico (1981–88); Mexican Communist Party (1946–81)
- Spouse: Martha Recaséns Díaz de León

Arnoldo Martínez Verdugo (12 January 1925 – 24 May 2013) was a Mexican socialist politician and democracy activist. A long-standing leader of the Mexican Communist Party and the Unified Socialist Party of Mexico (PSUM), Martínez promoted political self-criticism, refused to support regional guerrilla movements, condemned the Soviet invasion of Czechoslovakia and promoted the unification of the political left.

== Biography ==
Martínez was born in Pericos, a small town in Mocorito, Sinaloa, into a family of farmers. His parents were Yssac Martínez Ortega and Silvina Verdugo Verdugo. He started working in his teens and in 1943 he decided to move to Mexico City to take a job at the San Rafael Paper Co. and undertake studies in painting at La Esmeralda National School of Painting and Sculpture (1944–46).

In 1946 he joined Mexican Communist Party and soon started directing its Communist Youth's organizing committee (1948–50). After some years rising through its hierarchy, including spending some time in the Soviet Union studying Communism, he joined a faction that succeeded in overthrowing the long-time leadership of Stalinist Dionisio Encina, who had led the party from 1940 to 1960. He was chosen as General Secretary of the Mexican Communist Party's Central Committee in 1963 and remained in the post until 1981.

He was one of the protagonists of the political negotiations that in 1978 resulted in the first electoral reform that permitted the PCM to obtain conditional registration, allowing the party to participate in the 1979 election, when it won 18 seats and one of its deputies served as Parliamentary Coordinator.

In 1981, he directed the dissolution of the Mexican Communist Party and its fusion with other leftist forces, resulting in the Unified Socialist Party of Mexico, which nominated him for the presidency in the 1982 elections. Before this, Martínez had been abducted and freed after the payment of a ransom.

He served twice in the Chamber of Deputies as a plurinominal legislator; first representing the Communist Party of Mexico (1979–82) and later representing the Unified Socialist Party of Mexico (1985–88). Subsequently, he joined with the forces of Cuauhtémoc Cárdenas Solórzano in his campaign for the presidency in the 1988 elections.

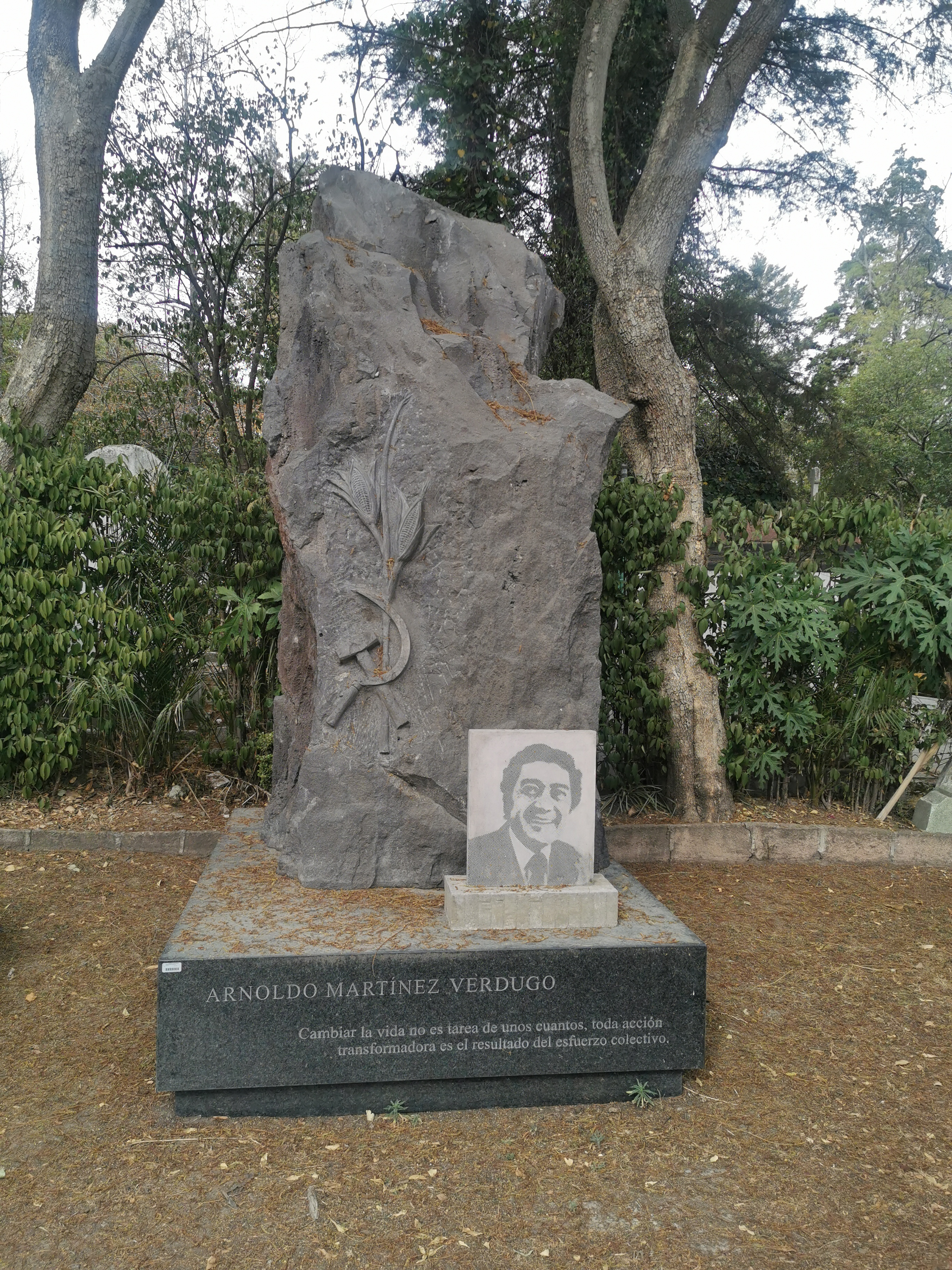
Grave of Martínez Verdugo in the Rotunda of Illustrious Persons in Panteón de Dolores in Mexico City

Martínez was a member of the Party of the Democratic Revolution (PRD), a political institution he helped to found and finance in its early years. He was elected its emeritus advisor but his title was removed on 29 November 2009 on strategic grounds, as the result of political struggles inside the party. This maneuver was called "an act of moral amnesia, of disloyalty to its origins, of shabbiness" by Mexico's National Journalism Prize laureate Miguel Ángel Granados Chapa. (Note: cfr. "En consecuencia, es un acto de amnesia moral, de deslealtad al origen, de mezquindad, el que las negociaciones coyunturales hayan dejado fuera de la lista de consejeros eméritos del PRD a Arnoldo Martínez Verdugo y a Gerardo Unzueta, miembros de aquel partido comunista." Miguel Ángel Granados Chapa in Plaza Pública, Reforma, p. 19 (1 December 2008). Quoted in Unzueta, 2008.)

== In popular culture ==
In the alternate history of the Apple TV+ show For All Mankind, Martínez Verdugo was elected President of Mexico on 1986.

== Publications ==
- El Partido Comunista Mexicano, trayectoria y perspectivas (in English: The Mexican Communist Party, Path and Perspectives) Mexico City: Ediciones de Cultura Popular, 1971.
- El Partido Comunista Mexicano y la reforma política (The Mexican Communist Party and the Political Reform) Mexico City: Ediciones de Cultura Popular, 1977.
- Crisis política y alternativa comunista (Political crisis and Communist alternative) Mexico City: Ediciones de Cultura Popular, 1979.
- La creación del PSUM (The Creation of the Unified Socialist Party of Mexico) Mexico City: Ediciones del Comité Central, 1982.
- Marcha por la democracia (March for Democracy) Mexico City: Ediciones del Comité Central, 1982.
- El proyecto socialista (The Socialist Project) Mexico City: Ediciones del Comité Central, 1982.
- Historia del comunismo en México (History of Communism in Mexico), Mexico City: Grijalbo, 1985.
