= David Huerta =

Mexican poet (1949–2022)

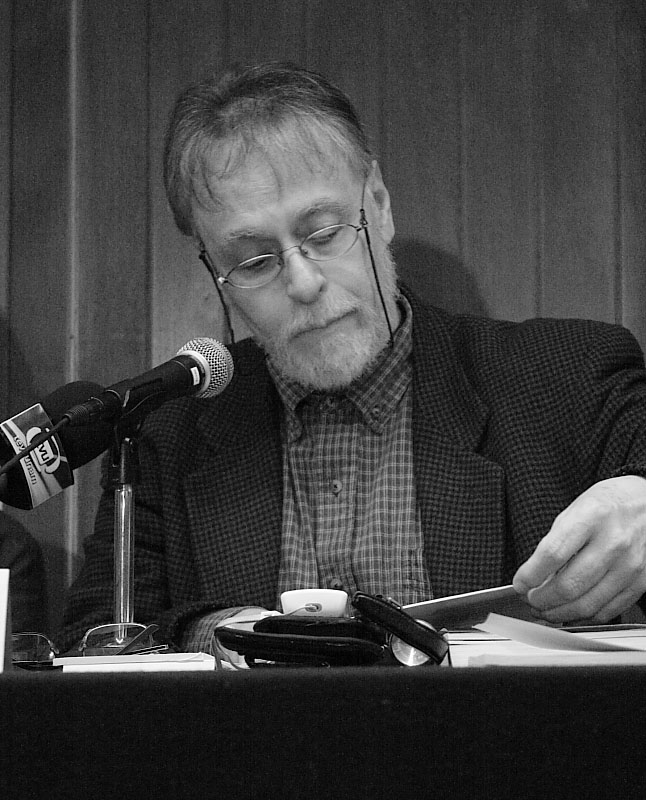
- David Huerta in 2009, in a poetry reading
- Born: October 8, 1949. Mexico City
- Died: October 3, 2022 (aged 72); Mexico City
- Education: National Autonomous University of Mexico
- Occupations: Poet, writer
- Spouse: Verónica Murguía
- Father: Efraín Huerta

David Huerta (8 October 1949–3 October 2022) was a Mexican poet and the son of well-known poet Efraín Huerta.

== Biography ==
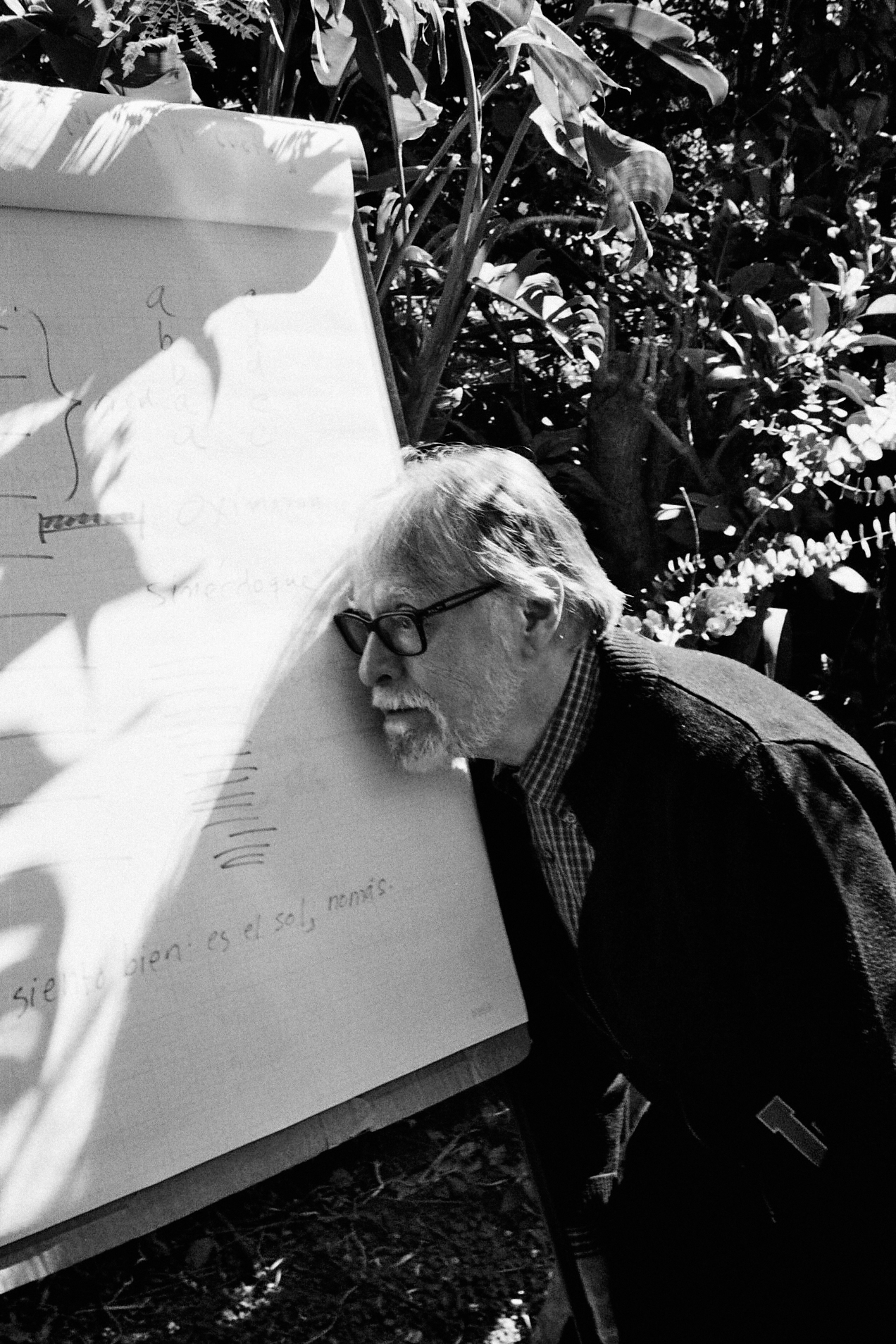
David Huerta in Tepoztlán, 2018.

He was born in Mexico City, the son of the poets Efraín Huerta and Mireya Bravo Munguía, and was immersed from childhood in Mexico's literary environment. He studied Philosophy, and English and Spanish literature at the National Autonomous University of Mexico (UNAM). There he met Rubén Bonifaz Nuño and Jesús Arellano, who published his first book of poems, The Garden of Light.

Huerta spent many years translating and editing for the Fondo de Cultura Económica, an institution where he directed the magazine La Gaceta del FCE. In addition to his poetry and essays, he wrote an opinion column in the political weekly Proceso. He opposed cuts to the cultural budget by the Mexican government, struggling in particular to preserve the home of the poet Ramón López Velarde (whose library is named after Huerta's father), which has often been threatened by a shortage of resources.

His advocacy of literature and poetry was extensive as a coordinator of literary workshops in the Casa del Lago of UNAM, INBA, and Institute for Social Security and Services for State Workers. He was also a teacher of literature at the Octavio Paz Foundation and the Foundation of Mexican Letters.

Of himself as a poet, Huerta said:

"I am a writer of rather traditional poetry. I would say that what I do is a poetry of images, metaphors, similes, metonym, of all kinds of tropes and figures of speech. Rather than the cult or devotion of the image, I am sure that through images we can still say things that help us live a little on the fringe of the market, if that's possible."

— Biography of David Huerta

Huerta died of kidney failure on 3 October 2022.

== Awards and recognition ==
Huerta received numerous awards, most notably the Carlos Pellicer poetry award in 1990, the Xavier Villaurrutia Award in 2006 and in 2015 the National Prize for Arts in the Linguistics and literature category. He was a Fellow of the Mexican Writers' Centre (1970-1971), the Guggenheim Foundation (1978-1979), and the National Endowment for Culture and Arts (FONCA). Since 1993 he was a member of the Sistema Nacional de Creadores de Arte.

== Personal life ==
He was married to the writer Verónica Murguía.

== Works ==
- The Garden of Light (UNAM, 1972)
- Notebook November (Era, 1976; Conaculta 1992)
- Footprints of the civilized (the typewriter, 1977)
- Version (Fondo de Cultura Económica, 1978 Era, 2005))
- The Mirror of the body (UNAM, 1980)
- Incurable (Era, 1987)
- History (Ediciones Toledo, 1990)
- The objects are closer than they appear (1990)
- The Shadow of the Dog (Aldus, 1996)
- The music of what happens (Conaculta, 1997)
- To the surface (Filodecaballos, 2002)
- The blue flame (Era, 2002)
- The White Street (Era, 2006)
- Translations by the Poetry Translation Centre.

== See also ==
- Mexican literature
- Efraín Huerta
- Fondo de Cultura Económica
- Xavier Villaurrutia
