= Barandal (magazine) =

Mexican literary magazine

Barandal is a Mexican literary and cultural journal. In its original form, it published seven issues between 1931 and 1932; the title then fell into abeyance until its revival in 2021.

== 1930s ==
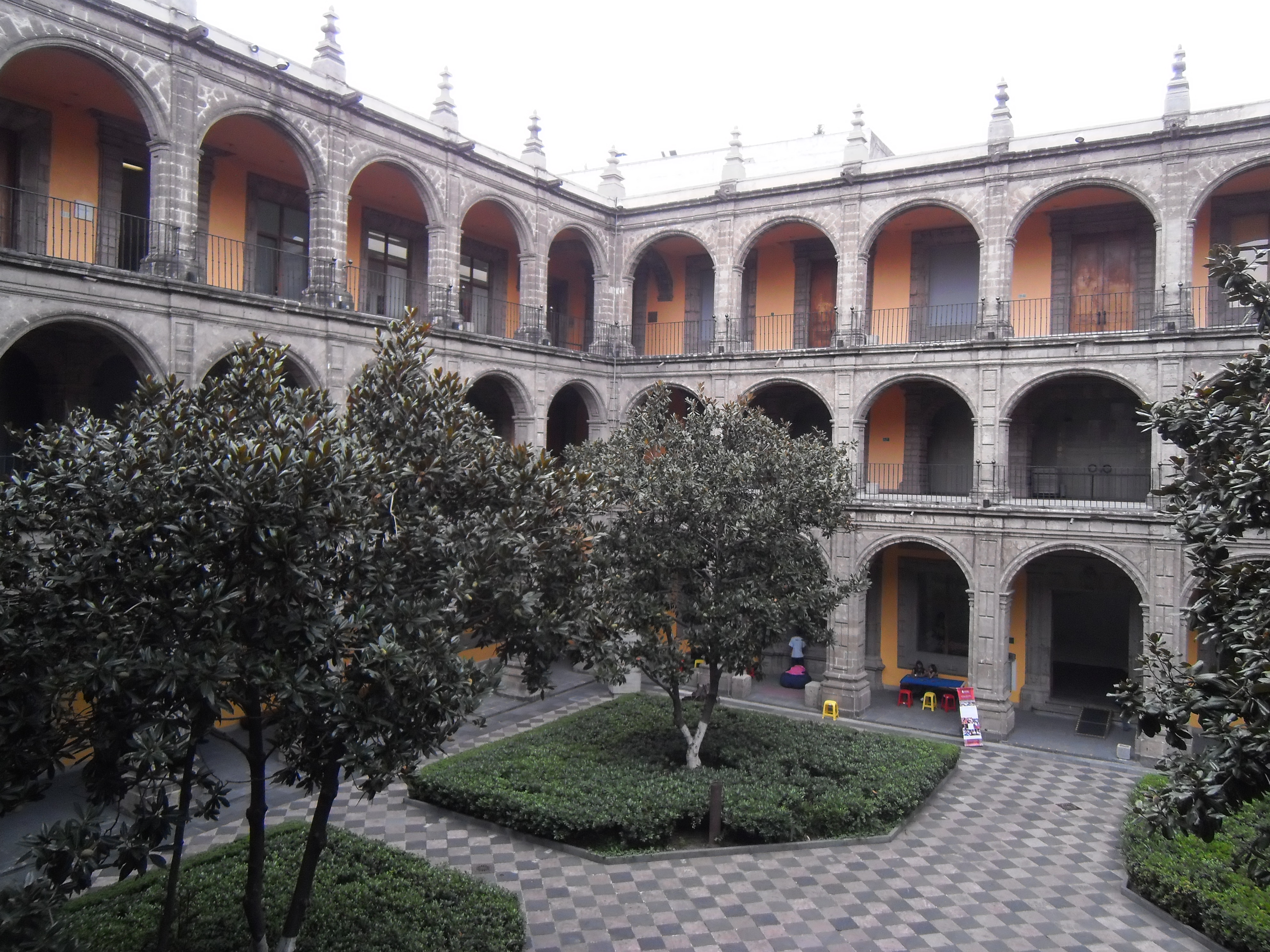
Main courtyard of the Colegio de San Ildefonso

Barandal was founded by four students of the National Preparatory School at the Colegio de San Ildefonso in Mexico City in 1931: Rafael López Malo, Octavio Paz, Salvador Toscano and Arnulfo Martínez Lavalle, whose names appeared as the collective editorial board. All four were studying preparatoria and planned to go on to study law at the National Autonomous University of Mexico (UNAM).

The name Barandal (English: balustrade) was in reference to the galleries surrounding the college's central courtyard. Because the editorial team generally gathered at one such location, their classmates began to refer to them as los barandales.

Issues contained around 20 pages and followed the same basic structure: The first section, titled Índice, contained literary works and poetry by different authors. The second was titled Temas and contained essays on scientists, researchers and thinkers. The third section, Notas, was unsigned and offered commentaries on writers and their work. Seven issues were printed between August 1931 and March 1932. An individual copy cost 20 centavos and annual subscriptions were available for one peso.

It was notable for seeing the publication of some of the earliest poems by Octavio Paz. In addition to the regular issues, a number of supplements were published (Note: Four or five: sources disagree.) containing works by writers including the poets Carlos Pellicer, Xavier Villaurrutia and Salvador Novo.

The same group were also responsible for the later journal Cuadernos del Valle de México, which was in existence from 1933 to 1934. Cuadernos was in turn followed by Taller in 1938.

== 2020s ==
In March 2021, on the occasion of what would have been Paz's 107th birthday, the Colegio de San Ildefonso and the UNAM announced that the title was to be revived. The joint editors were David Huerta (Note: Huerta died in October 2022; the fourth issue of the revived Barandal is largely dedicated to his memory.) and Jorge Gutiérrez Reyna. As of January 2025, four issues have been published.
