= Jorge Díaz Serrano =

Mexican politician and engineer

Director General of Petróleos Mexicanos
- In office 1 December 1976 – 6 June 1981
- President: José López Portillo
- Preceded by: Antonio Dovalí Jaime
- Succeeded by: Julio Rodolfo Moctezuma

Personal details
- Born: 6 February 1921 Nogales, Sonora, Mexico
- Died: 25 April 2011 (aged 90) Mexico City, Mexico
- Party: Institutional Revolutionary
- Spouse: Helvia Martínez Verdayes
- Education: National Polytechnic Institute

Jorge Díaz Serrano (6 February 1921 – 25 April 2011) was a Mexican politician and engineer, member of the Institutional Revolutionary Party, ambassador to the Soviet Union, senator, and director general of Pemex from 1976 to 1981.
