= Mexican Weekend =

Beginning of the 1982 Latin American debt crisis

The Mexican Weekend marked the beginning of the Latin American debt crisis. In August 1982, Mexican Secretary of Finance Jesús Silva Herzog Flores flew to Washington, D.C., to declare Mexico's foreign debt unmanageable, and announce that his country was in danger of defaulting.

This crisis had long lasting impact over the entire Latin American countries which is also known as "Latin American debt crisis". The United States and other neighboring developed countries such as Canada came up with the assistance plane for Mexico with the co-ordination of financial institutions like the International Monetary Fund, World Bank etc. During this period major economic reforms were undertaken, with liberalisation and privatisation replacing the earlier model of state led growth.

As a fallout of neo-liberal economic policies, foreign investors started investing heavily and over $90 billion flowed into the country during 1990-93. But within a short span of time this plan failed totally and Mexico failed one more time to get itself out of this crisis.

== See also ==
- Latin American debt crisis
- Brady Bonds
